= Magdalena González =

Magdalena González may refer to:

- Magdalena González Furlong (born 1958), Mexican politician
- Magdalena González Sánchez (born 1974), Mexican astrophysicist
