= Gerardo de la Riva Pinal =

Mexican politician

- Born: 25 November 1954 (age 71); Chalco de Díaz Covarrubias, State of Mexico, Mexico
- Occupation: Politician
- Political party: PRI

José Gerardo de la Riva Pinal (born 25 November 1954) is a Mexican politician from the Institutional Revolutionary Party (PRI).

In the 2000 general election he was elected to the Chamber of Deputies to represent the State of Mexico's 33rd district during the 58th session of Congress.

De la Riva Pinal resigned his seat on 24 July 2002 and was replaced by his alternate, Esperanza Santillán Castillo, for the remainder of his term
