= Albert Diaz =

Albert Diaz, Alberto Diaz, or Al Diaz may refer to:

- Al Diaz (artist) (born 1959), American graffiti artist
- Albert Diaz (judge) (born 1960), U.S. federal judge from North Carolina
- Alberto Díaz Jr. (born 1943), U.S. Navy rear admiral
- Alberto Díaz Gutiérrez ("Alberto Korda", 1928–2001), Cuban photographer
- Albert "Tiger" Diaz, founding member of the musical group La Sombra
- Alberto Díaz (Alberto Díaz Ortiz, born 1994), Spanish basketball player
- Alberto Díaz Trujillo (born 1975), Mexican politician
- Alberto Cabero Díaz (1874–1955), Chilean politician
- Albert Rivera Diaz (born 1979), Spanish lawyer and politician
- Alphonso V. Diaz, American NASA official
