= Adalberto Álvarez Marines =

Mexican artist and artisan

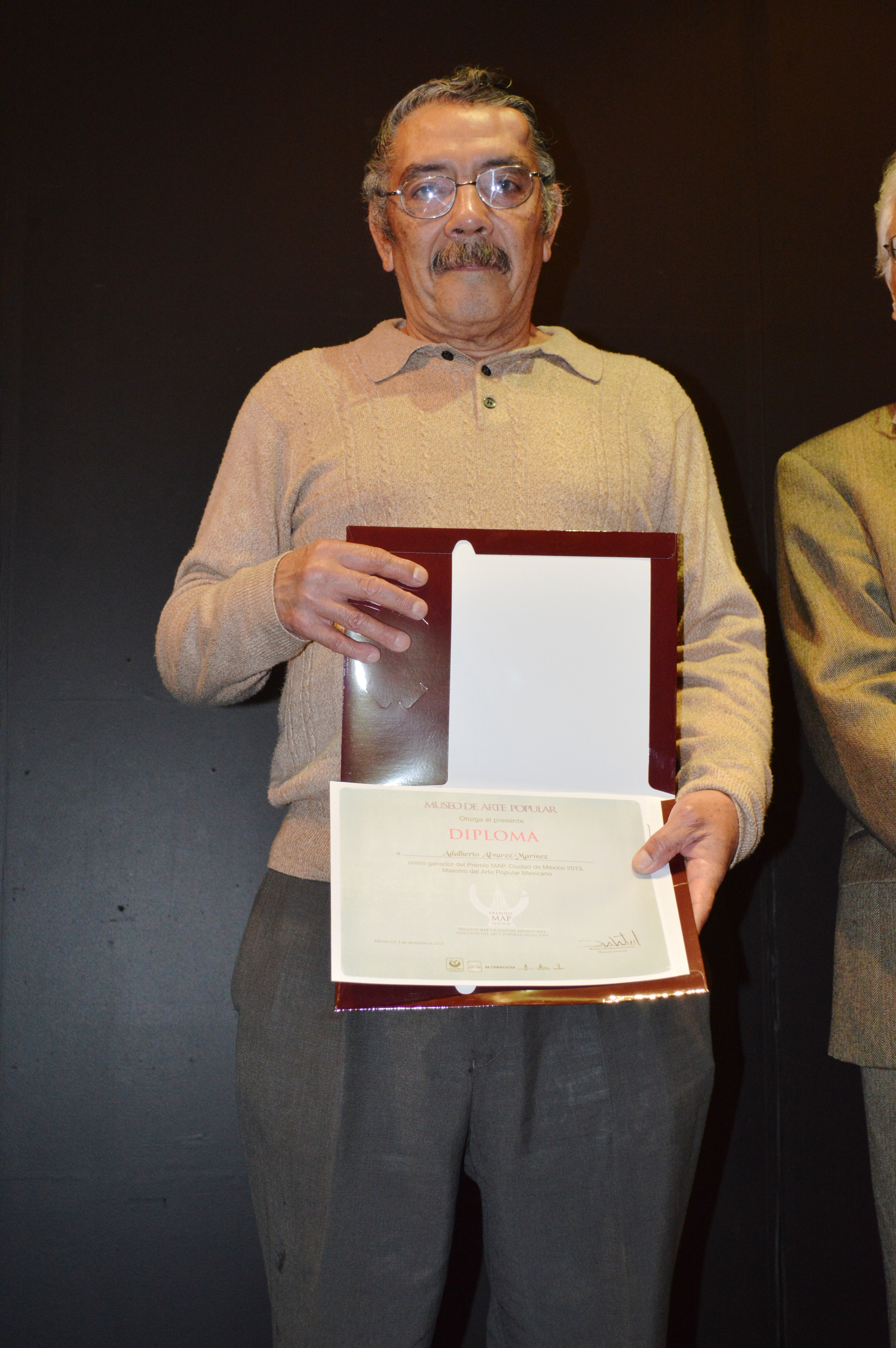
Adalberto Alvarez receiving recognition as a grand master at the Museo de Arte Popular

Adalberto Alvarez Marines (born 1952) is a Mexican artist and artisan who specializes in creating sculptures and other works in hard paper mache, called cartonería in Mexican Spanish. As a child, Alvarez began drawing and writing, with some success in publishing illustrations and stories. In his mid twenties, he discovered cartoneria and shifted his artistic work to this medium, first on a personal basis while working at a factory until in 1994, when he dedicated himself to the craft full-time. Alvarez's work is distinct in Mexican cartoneria because of its often non-traditional themes and artistic sense, often classed as art, rather than handcraft. With the exception of alebrijes and skeletal figures, Alvarez avoids traditional forms in favor of exploring what can be done with the medium, focusing on sculpture, decorative items and furniture. He was named a "grand master" of Mexican folk art in 2014 and has exhibited his work in Mexico and the United States. However, he does not like to spend time in exhibition and promotion, establishing his own Cartoneria Museum at his home in Santa Catarina Ayotzingo, Chalco, State of Mexico

== Life ==
Alvarez was born in the rural town of Huandacareo, Michoacan in 1952 to a traditional family, with no artistic background One aspect of this traditional upbringing was the use of scary stories such as those relate to "El Coco" (like the monster in the closest) to get children to behave. Alvarez states that these stories scared him more than most children and have stayed with him ever since. His parents decided to move the family to Mexico City when he was about eight years old in hopes that their children would have professional careers. This would not be the case for Adalberto, who did general labor, factory and cleaning work form most of the first half of his life. He did, however, stand out by learning to draw and write, mostly fantasy and horror, and even had some success by his 20s illustrating books and publishing stories. His direction changed when he discovered cartoneria in 1974 from some acquantiances who were trying to learn. He was fascinated by what they were trying to do with paper, paste and wire, but felt he could do better. He decided this is what he should do artistically.

Around this same time, 1975) he moved to Santa Catarina Ayotzingo, where he continues to live. It was then nothing but fields and today it is still rural and isolated, despite being just outside the border of Mexico City proper. He worked for a number of years at a factory that made wooden hangers, using scraps of wire and paper to make his sculptures during down times. He even made large cantina piece working before and after his shift. This piece was raffled off, with even the factory owners buying tickets.

He credits the support of his wife and children to be able to continue working.

== Career and Cartonería Museum ==
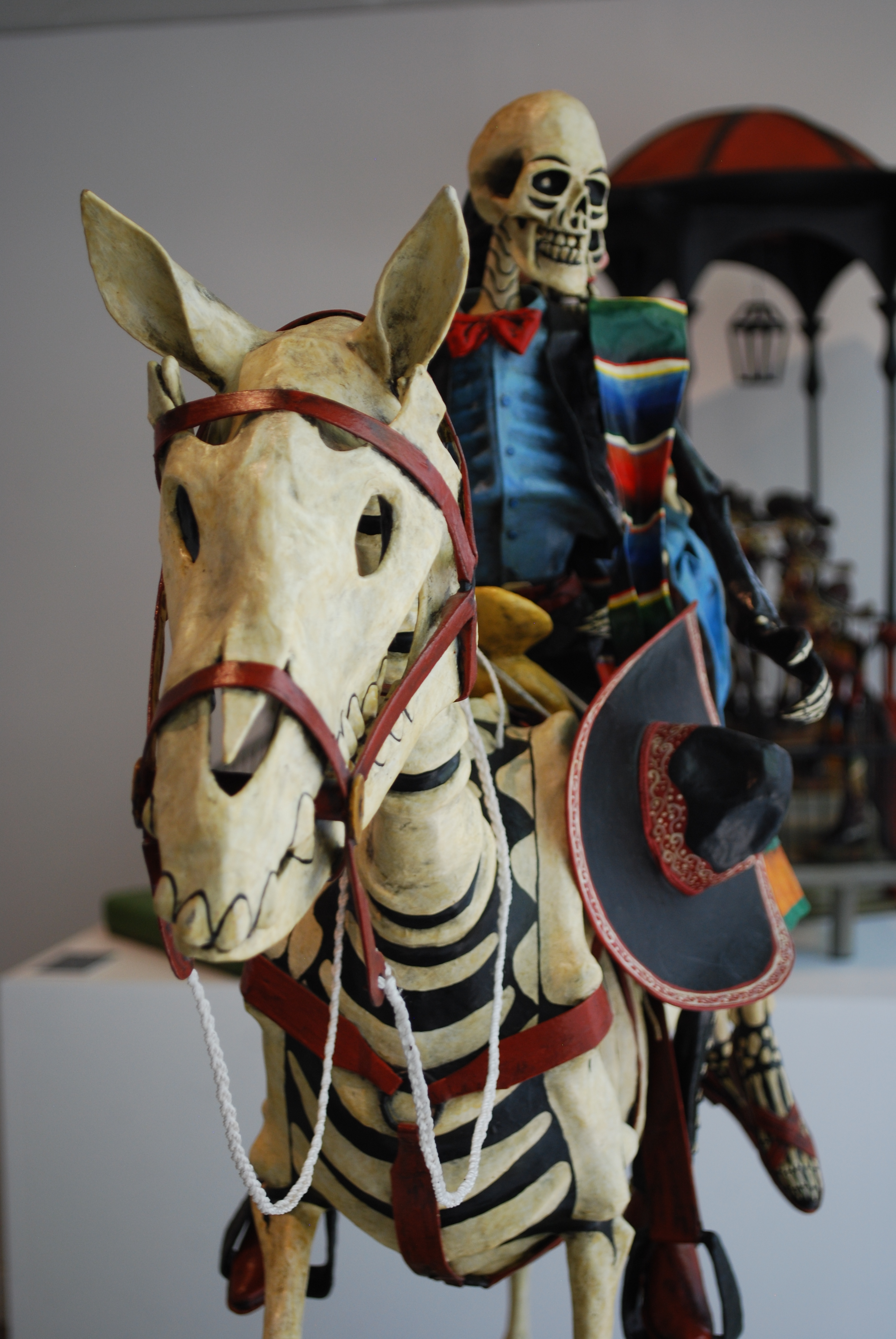
Skeletal horse and rider made from cartonería by Adalberto Alvarez Marinez on display at the Museo de Arte Popular in Mexico City

Alvarez began working with cartoneria in his mid twenties, not to become a commercial craftsman but as an artistic outlet. He is completely self-taught, with the exception of some classes he was invited to at the then National School of Arts in Xochimilco, Mexico City by a teacher who stated he needed to refine his technique.

In 1992, he was hired by the Ciudadela Market to make alebrijes, but it was difficult for him because his creativity did not always coincide with the market and he was more interested in making an impact on people then on sales. So, the job lasted only three years. In 1994, he quit his factory job to devote himself to his art fill time. He has had some difficulty in selling pieces because of their paper base, but this has not deterred him.

Alvarez teaches at the cultural center of Chalco and has been the main cartoneria instructor at the Fabrica de Arte y Oficios in Tlahuac since 2011. He also receives invitations to give classes and workshops at institutions such as the National Museum of Popular Culture.

His first exhibition was at the Chalco Cultural Center, which he admits scared him to present his work to artists and intellectuals. He has since exhibited in various museums and other cultural institutions as both artist and artisan in the State of Mexico and Mexico City, and has exhibited in various Mexican universities. His first and only major international exhibition of his work was in the United States, although he has sent pieces to Italy, France, Brazil and South Korea. In 2014, he exhibited at the Museo de Arte Popular for the first time as a "grand master."

Alvarez is not a fan of museums or of spending time exhibiting or promoting his work as it takes time away from his workshop. He built an upper floor of his home to establish a Cartonería Museum, which contains over fifty pieces of his best work, along with some pieces by other artisans such as Sotero Lemus although in reality the entire property is filled with his work, which include furniture, vases and other decorative items. He created the museum to have cartoneria exhibited on a permanent basis, and receives regular visits from students in local schools.

He has a long-standing relationship with he Museo de Arte Popular, participating regularly with the Monumental Alebrije Parade, and working on major projects such as the "History Train" for Day of the Dead. In 2014, the museum named one a "grand master" of Mexican folk art.

== Artistry ==
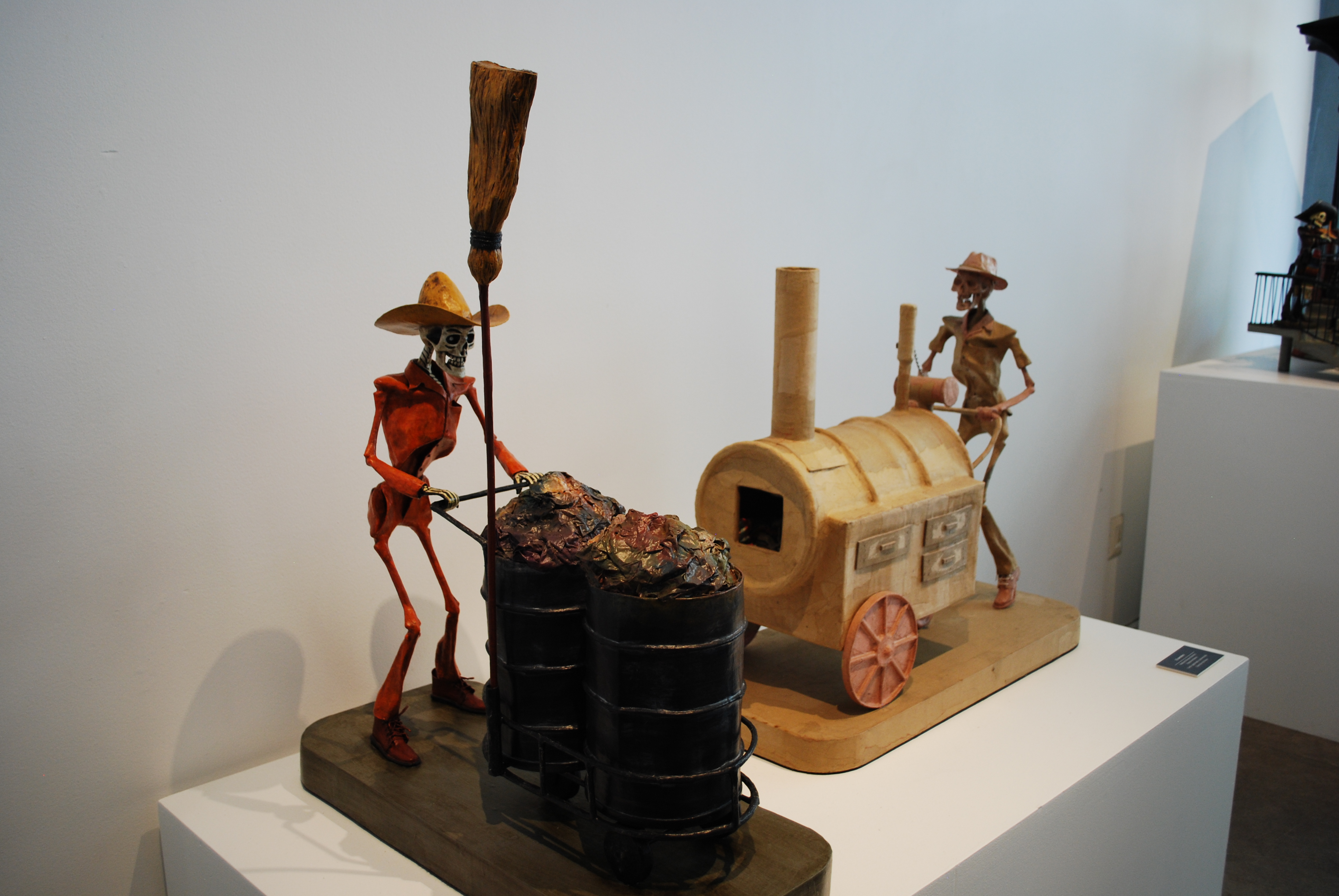
Skeletal images of a street sweeper and camote (sweet potato) vendor

His work is unique in the world of Mexican cartoneria. Although he sells works, he does not primarily create for commercialization, believe in personal expression first. In fact, he stated once his disappointment with the famous Linares family for the "overly commercial" aspect of their work. The basis of his work is from his fantasies and nightmares of his childhood, looking for a way to express them. Most of these images come from both Mexican and European culture, including pre Hispanic images, Mexican folk art, fantasy literature and Greek mythology. With the exception of alebrijes and skeletal figures depicting scenes from Mexican life, he generally avoids making traditional cartoneria items, stating that they do not challenge him. Instead, he makes sculptures, decorative items such as vases and furniture, looking to see what can be done with the medium, rather than what has already been done.(chalco) His sculptures depict pre Hispanic figures, demons, dragons, fairies, Mexican and European depictions of Death, mermaids and other human figures with fantastic aspects, with names such as "Quixote of La Mancha," "Circe," "Neptune" and "The Honey Collector.

His work is so refined that he is classified more often as an artist rather than as an artisan although he considers "art" to be to grandiose to describe his work. His works have fine details such as the folds of the dress, musculature, realistic and expressive faces and surfaces are completely smooth, and seamless. All his pieces are formed freehand; no molds are used.

He prefers to express himself through his work rather than to talk about what inspires them.
