= 15th federal electoral district of the State of Mexico =

Federal electoral district of Mexico

State of Mexico's 15th
- Electoral district of the Chamber of Deputies of Mexico

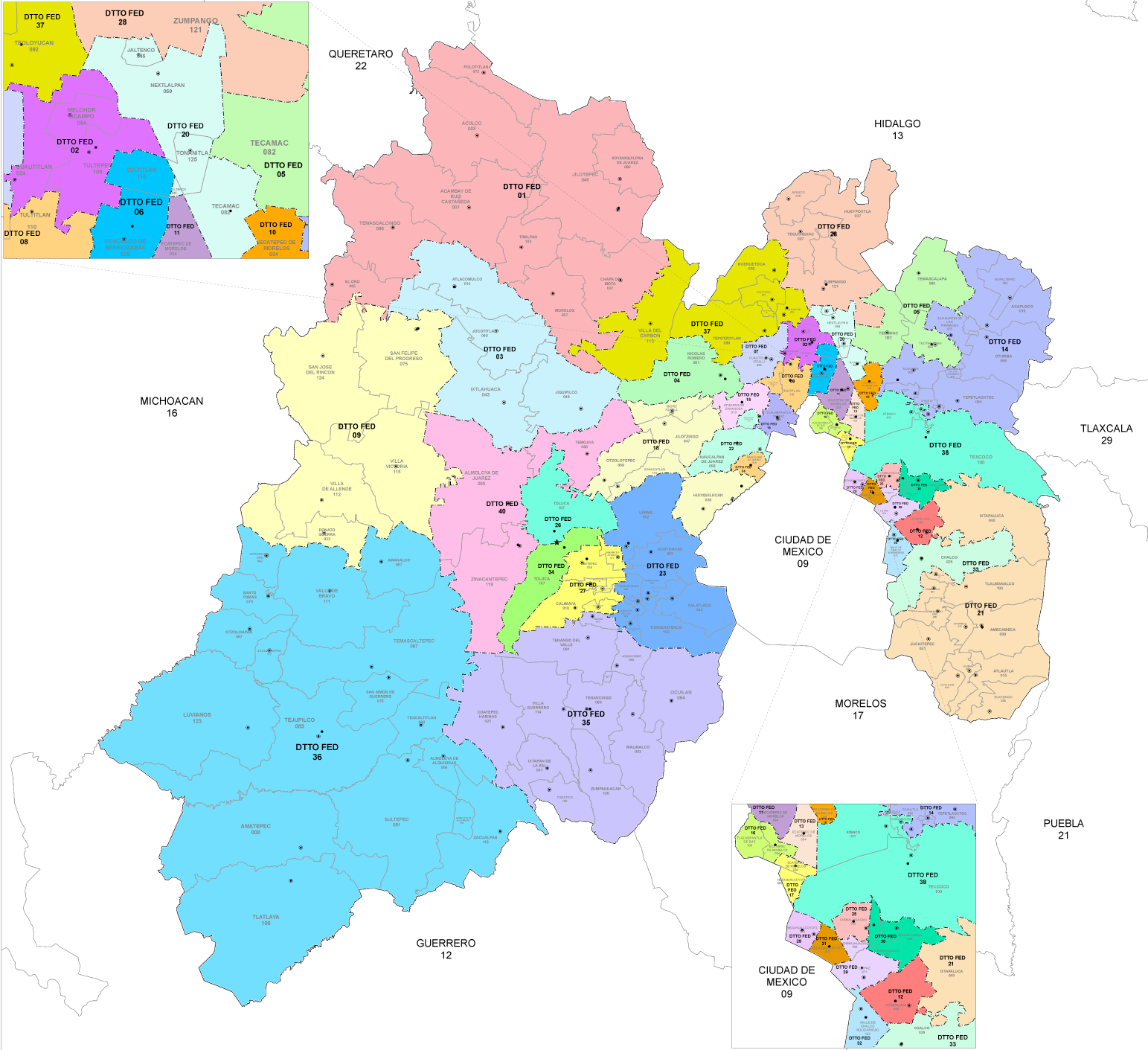
- State of Mexico's districts since 2023

Incumbent
- Member: Josefina Anaya Martínez
- Party: ▌Morena
- Congress: 66th (2024–2027)

District
- State: State of Mexico
- Head town: Ciudad López Mateos
- Coordinates: 19°33′N 99°14′W
- Covers: Atizapán de Zaragoza (part)
- PR region: Fifth
- Precincts: 144
- Population: 450,999 (2020 census)

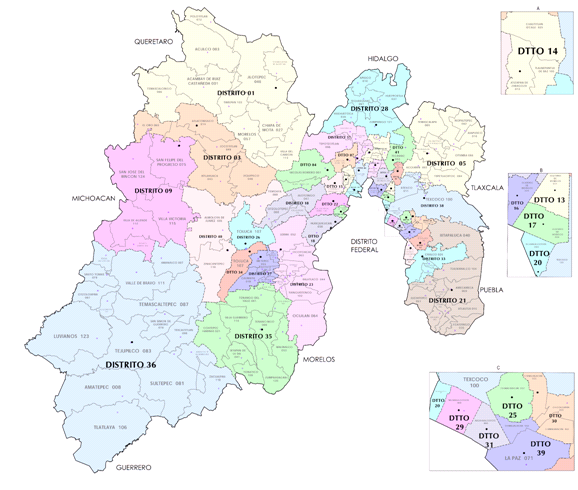
2017–2022 districting scheme

The 15th federal electoral district of the State of Mexico (Spanish: Distrito electoral federal 15 del Estado de México) is one of the 300 electoral districts into which Mexico is divided for elections to the federal Chamber of Deputies and one of 40 such districts in the State of Mexico.

It elects one deputy to the lower house of Congress for each three-year legislative session by means of the first-past-the-post system. Votes cast in the district also count towards the calculation of proportional representation ("plurinominal") deputies elected from the fifth region.

The current member for the district, elected in the 2024 general election, is Josefina Anaya Martínez of the National Regeneration Movement (Morena).

== District territory ==
Under the 2023 districting plan adopted by the National Electoral Institute (INE), which is to be used for the 2024, 2027 and 2030 federal elections, the 15th district is located in the Greater Mexico City urban area, covering 144 precincts (secciones electorales) in one of the state's 125 municipalities:

- Atizapán de Zaragoza. (Note: The remainder of the municipality is covered by the 22nd district.)

The head town (cabecera distrital), where results from individual polling stations are gathered together and tallied, is Ciudad López Mateos, the municipal seat. In the 2020 census, the district reported a total population of 450,999.

== Previous districting schemes ==
Evolution of electoral district numbers
	1974	1978	1996	2005	2017	2023
State of Mexico	15	34	36	40	41	40
Chamber of Deputies	196	300				

Under the previous districting plans enacted by the INE and its predecessors, the 15th district was situated as follows:

2017–2022

The western and central parts of Atizapán de Zaragoza (the remainder belonged to the 14th district).

2005–2017

The south-east of Atizapán de Zaragoza and the north-west of Tlalnepantla. The head town was at Tlalnepantla.

1996–2005

The centre and north-west of Tlalnepantla.

1978–1996

The municipalities of Amecameca, Atlautla, Ayapango, Cocotitlán, Chalco, Chicoloapan, Ecatzingo, Ixtapaluca, Juchitepec, Ozumba, Temamatla, Tenango del Aire, Tepetlixpa and Tlalmanalco, with its head town at Chalco de Díaz Covarrubias.

== Deputies returned to Congress ==
(Mexico) National parties
- Current
- PAN
- PRI
- PT
- PVEM
- MC
- Morena
- PAZ
- Somos
- Defunct or local only
- PLM
- PNR
- PRM
- PNM
- PP
- PPS
- PARM
- PFCRN
- CON
- PANAL
- PSD
- PES
- PES
- PRD

State of Mexico's 15th district
Election	Deputy	Party	Term	Legislature
1916	Donato Bravo Izquierdo		1916–1917	Constituent Congress of Querétaro
...
1979	Graciela Santana Benhumea	Institutional Revolutionary Party	1979–1982	51st Congress
1982	Gildardo Herrera Gómez Tagle	Institutional Revolutionary Party	1982–1985	52nd Congress
1985	Héctor Ximénez González	Institutional Revolutionary Party	1985–1988	53rd Congress
1988	Martha Patricia Rivera Pérez	Institutional Revolutionary Party	1988–1991	54th Congress
1991	Felipe Medina Santos	Institutional Revolutionary Party	1991–1994	55th Congress
1994	Francisco Maldonado Ruiz	Institutional Revolutionary Party	1994–1997	56th Congress
1997	Rubén Mendoza Ayala	National Action Party (Mexico)	1997–2000	57th Congress
2000	Ulises Ramírez Núñez	National Action Party (Mexico)	2000–2003	58th Congress
2003	Magdalena González Furlong	National Action Party (Mexico)	2003–2006	59th Congress
2006	Alejandro Landero Gutiérrez	National Action Party (Mexico)	2006–2009	60th Congress
2009	Carlos Bello Otero	National Action Party (Mexico)	2009–2012	61st Congress
2012	Alberto Díaz Trujillo	National Action Party (Mexico)	2012–2015	62nd Congress
2015	Román Francisco Cortés Lugo	National Action Party (Mexico)	2015–2018	63rd Congress
2018	Raúl Ernesto Sánchez Barrales Zavalza	Social Encounter Party National Regeneration Movement Labour Party (Mexico)	2018–2021	64th Congress
2021	Carlos Madrazo Limón	National Action Party (Mexico)	2021–2024	65th Congress
2024	Josefina Anaya Martínez	National Regeneration Movement	2024–2027	66th Congress

== Presidential elections ==
State of Mexico's 15th district
Election	District won by	Party or coalition	%
2018	Andrés Manuel López Obrador	Juntos Haremos Historia	49.2886
2024	Claudia Sheinbaum Pardo	Sigamos Haciendo Historia	53.7797
