= Magdalena González Sánchez =

Mexican astrophysicist and nuclear physicist

- Born: María Magdalena González Sánchez; May 8, 1974 (age 52); Mexico City, Mexico
- Education: National Autonomous University of Mexico
- Occupation: Astrophysicist
- Employers: High Altitude Water Cherenkov Experiment; UNAM Institute of Astronomy
- Awards: Elsevier Foundation Award (2011); Sor Juana Inés de la Cruz Recognition (2015)

María Magdalena González Sánchez (born May 8, 1974) is a Mexican astrophysicist, nuclear physicist, researcher, and professor best known for her contributions in gamma ray research and for being the head of the High Altitude Water Cherenkov Experiment (HAWC). She has published 90 articles about her field of study in indexed journals. In 2015 she received the Sor Juana Inés de la Cruz Recognition from the National Autonomous University of Mexico (UNAM).

== Biography ==
Dr. González obtained a licentiate in physics at the UNAM Faculty of Sciences within the area of nuclear physics. She earned her PhD in physics at the University of Wisconsin–Madison in the area of high-energy astrophysics while working at the Los Alamos National Laboratory's Neutron Science and Technology Group. She had a postdoctoral residency at the UNAM Institute of Astronomy, where she is currently a senior researcher.

She is the initiator and collaborator on the HAWC gamma ray observatory, located on the Sierra Negra volcano in Puebla, Mexico. She was also a collaborator and participated in the discoveries of the Milagro Experiment.

Part of her research is dedicated to the study of gamma-ray bursts with satellite observatories. The most important result of her work in this area is the discovery of a type of MeV energy emission that has been confirmed by the Fermi Telescope.

Her current lines of research are: study of high-energy emissions from gamma-ray bursts (GRBs), study of Centaurus A as a possible accelerator of ultra-energetic cosmic rays, high-energy gamma-ray astrophysics with the HAWC and Milagro observatories, and installation of high-altitude Atmospheric Cherenkov detectors.

Her working group at the Institute of Astronomy comprises postdoctoral students and students of other academic levels, as well as academic technicians participating in the HAWC project.

== Scientific contributions ==
As initiator and collaborator on the HAWC observatory, Magdalena González was involved in the discovery of a new pulsar next to the Crab Nebula. This discovery provided information valuable in solving the problem of the excess of cosmic positrons that reach the Earth (cosmic rays).

She also participated in the first observation of the fusion of a pair of neutron stars, which was detected by gravitational waves and in several electromagnetic wavelengths.

== Awards and recognitions ==
- 2011: American Physical Society International Research Travel Award
- 2011: Elsevier Foundation Award to Young Scientists in Physics and Mathematics for the Latin America and Caribbean Region
- 2015: Sor Juana Inés de la Cruz Recognition, UNAM
