= Brenda Dingus =

High energy physicist, researcher

Brenda Lynn Dingus is an American particle astrophysicist at the Los Alamos National Laboratory, known for her research on gamma-ray bursts and cosmic rays.

== Education and career ==
Dingus majored in physics at Harvey Mudd College, graduating in 1982. She completed a Ph.D. in 1988 at the University of Maryland, College Park, specializing in experimental cosmic-ray physics under the supervision of Gaurang Yodh.

After working as a researcher for NASA at the Goddard Space Flight Center from 1989 to 1996, in the Energetic Gamma Ray Experiment Telescope program, she joined the University of Utah as an assistant professor of physics in 1996, where she became one of the founding officers of the Four Corners Section of the American Physical Society (APS), in 1997. She moved from there to the University of Wisconsin–Madison in 2000. While at the University of Wisconsin she began working with Los Alamos National Laboratory on the Fermi Gamma-ray Space Telescope (GLAST) mission, and in 2002 she moved to Los Alamos as a staff scientist, including work on the Milagro experiment and later as US spokesperson and operations manager for the High Altitude Water Cherenkov Experiment.

== Recognition ==
Dingus was a 1999 recipient of the Presidential Early Career Award for Scientists and Engineers, "for the development of innovative detectors for gamma-ray astrophysics, and for the creation of an exceptionally wide-ranging education and outreach program". She was named a Fellow of the American Physical Society in 2006, after a nomination from the APS Division of Astrophysics, "for her pioneering work on understanding the highest energy gamma-ray emission from gamma-ray bursts". She is also a Los Alamos National Laboratory Fellow, in the class of 2011.

She was elected to the National Academy of Sciences in 2025.
