= Verde (surname) =

Verde is a surname. In Spanish, Portuguese, Italian and Romanian it means "green". Notable people with this surname include:

- Alessandro Verde, Roman Catholic Cardinal
- Cristina Verde (born 1950), Mexican engineer
- Cuerno Verde, Comanche leader
- Dino Verde, Italian author, lyricist, playwright and screenwriter
- Gelsomina Verde, Neapolitan victim of the Camorra
- Manuel Verde (born 1966), Mexican boxer
- Marco Verde (born 2002), Mexican boxer
