= Juan Manuel Carbajal Hernández =

Mexican politician

- Born: 1 March 1964; Chalco de Díaz Covarrubias, State of Mexico, Mexico
- Died: 3 April 2019 (aged 55)
- Political party: PRI

Juan Manuel Carbajal Hernández (1 March 1964 – 3/4 April 2019) was a Mexican politician affiliated with the Institutional Revolutionary Party (PRI).

In the 2012 general election he was elected to the Chamber of Deputies to represent the State of Mexico's 33rd district during the 62nd session of Congress. He also served two terms (2009–2012 and 2016–2018) as municipal president of Chalco de Díaz Covarrubias.

Carbajal Hernández was abducted from his home in Tlalmanalco on 3 April 2019 by a group of armed men wearing Federal Police uniforms. He was found shot dead on a highway near Amecameca, State of Mexico, the following day.
