= 33rd federal electoral district of the State of Mexico =

Federal electoral district of Mexico

State of Mexico's 33rd
- Electoral district of the Chamber of Deputies of Mexico

- 32nd district since 2023

Incumbent
- Member: Anaís Burgos Hernández
- Party: ▌Morena
- Congress: 66th (2024–2027)

District
- State: State of Mexico
- Head town: Chalco de Díaz Covarrubias
- Coordinates: 19°16′N 98°54′W
- Covers: Chalco
- PR region: Fifth
- Precincts: 71
- Population: 398,534 (2020 census)

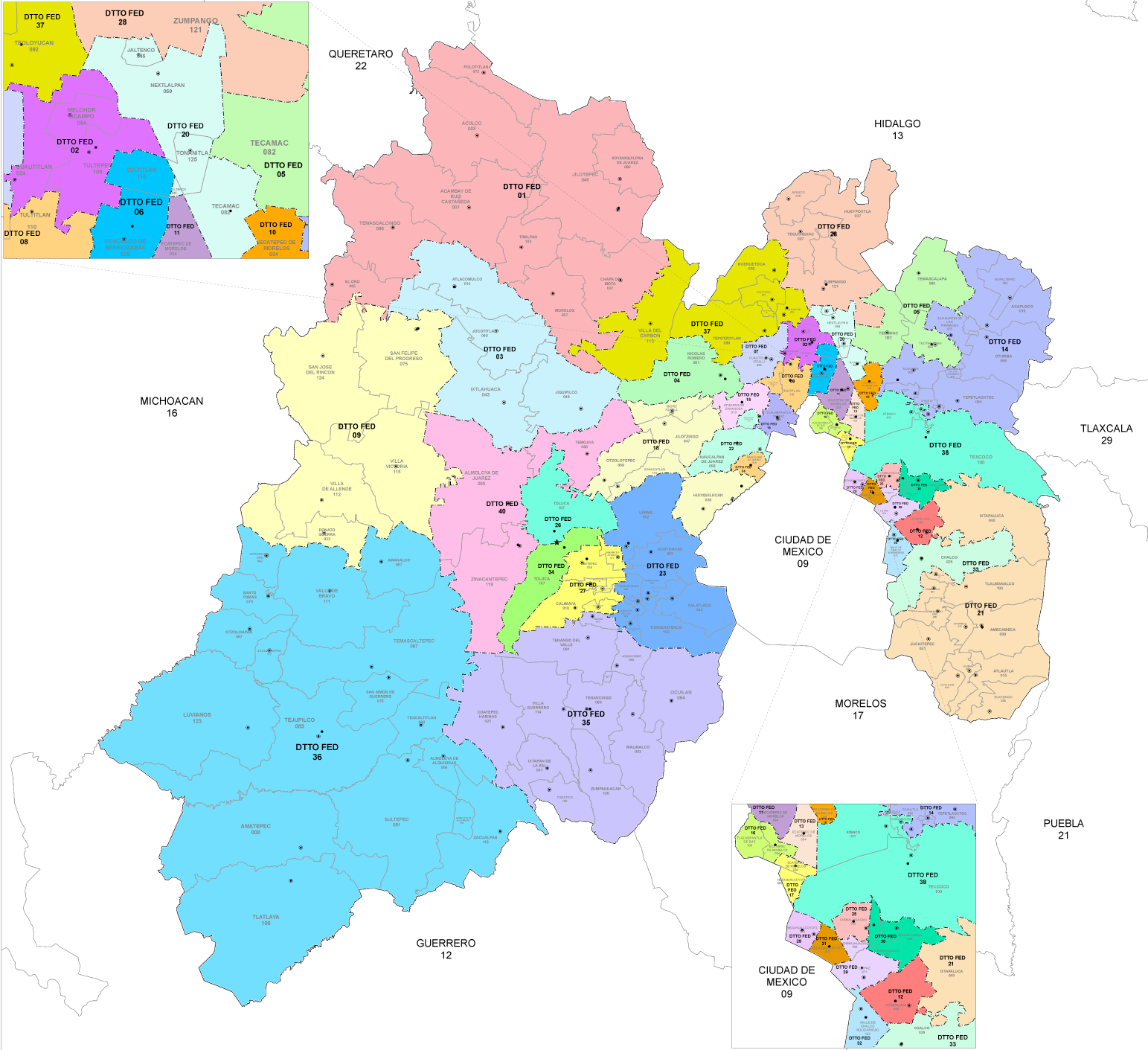
Federal electoral districts of the State of Mexico since 2023

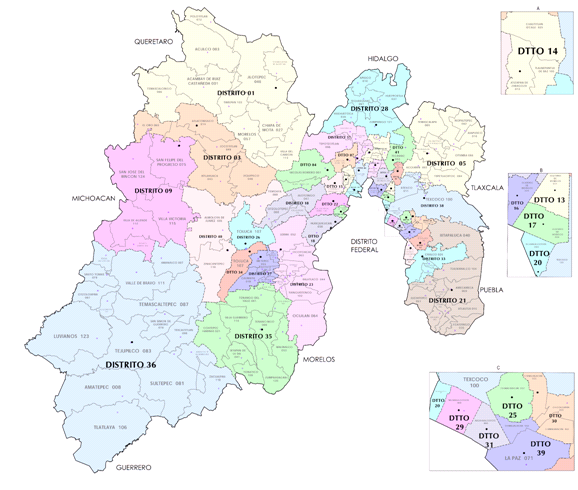
2017–2022 districting scheme

The 33rd federal electoral district of the State of Mexico (Spanish: Distrito electoral federal 33 del Estado de México) is one of the 300 electoral districts into which Mexico is divided for elections to the federal Chamber of Deputies and one of 40 such districts in the State of Mexico.

It elects one deputy to the lower house of Congress for each three-year legislative session by means of the first-past-the-post system. Votes cast in the district also count towards the calculation of proportional representation ("plurinominal") deputies elected from the fifth region.

The 33rd district was created by the 1977 electoral reforms, which increased the number of single-member seats in the Chamber of Deputies from 196 to 300. Under that plan, the State of Mexico's seat allocation rose from 15 to 34. The new districts were first contended in the 1979 mid-term election.

The current member for the district, elected in the 2024 general election, is Anaís Miriam Burgos Hernández of the National Regeneration Movement (Morena).

== District territory ==
Under the 2023 districting plan adopted by the National Electoral Institute (INE), which is to be used for the 2024, 2027 and 2030 federal elections, the 33rd district is located in the east of the Greater Mexico City urban area and covers the 71 electoral precincts (secciones electorales) that comprise the entirety of one of the state's 125 municipalities:

- Chalco

The head town (cabecera distrital), where results from individual polling stations are gathered together and tallied, is the municipal seat, Chalco de Díaz Covarrubias. In the 2020 census, the district reported a total population of 398,534.

== Previous districting schemes ==
Evolution of electoral district numbers
	1974	1978	1996	2005	2017	2023
State of Mexico	15	34	36	40	41	40
Chamber of Deputies	196	300				

Under the previous districting plans enacted by the INE and its predecessors, the 33rd district was situated as follows:

2017–2022

The municipalities of Chalco, Cocotitlán and Temamatla. The head town was at Chalco de Díaz Covarrubias.

2005–2017

Located in the state's extreme south-east, covering the southern bulk of Chalco and the municipalities of Amecameca, Atlautla, Ayapango, Cocotitlán, Ecatzingo, Juchitepec, Ozumba, Temamatla, Tenango del Aire, Tepetlixpa and Tlalmanalco. The head town was at Chalco de Díaz Covarrubias.

1996–2005

Located in the state's extreme south-east, covering the entirety of Chalco and Amecameca, Atlautla, Ayapango, Cocotitlán, Ecatzingo, Juchitepec, Ozumba, Temamatla, Tenango del Aire, Tepetlixpa and Tlalmanalco. The head town was at Chalco de Díaz Covarrubias.

1978–1996

A portion of the municipality of Tlalnepantla.

== Deputies returned to Congress ==
(Mexico) National parties
- Current
- PAN
- PRI
- PT
- PVEM
- MC
- Morena
- PAZ
- Somos
- Defunct or local only
- PLM
- PNR
- PRM
- PNM
- PP
- PPS
- PARM
- PFCRN
- CON
- PANAL
- PSD
- PES
- PES
- PRD

State of Mexico's 33rd district
Election	Deputy	Party	Term	Legislature
1979	José Luis García Montiel	Institutional Revolutionary Party	1979–1982	51st Congress
1982	Manuel Nogal Elorza	Institutional Revolutionary Party	1982–1985	52nd Congress
1985	Miguel Ángel Herrerías Alvarado	Institutional Revolutionary Party	1985–1988	53rd Congress
1988	Ruth Olvera Nieto	National Action Party (Mexico)	1988–1991	54th Congress
1991	Leodegario López Ramírez	Institutional Revolutionary Party	1991–1994	55th Congress
1994	Joaquín Rodríguez Lugo	Institutional Revolutionary Party	1994–1997	56th Congress
1997	Francisco Guevara Alvarado	Party of the Democratic Revolution	1997–2000	57th Congress
2000	José Gerardo de la Riva Pinal (Note: De la Riva Pinal took leave from his seat on 24 July 2002. Santillán Castillo, his alternate, was sworn in on 30 August 2002.); Esperanza Santillán Castillo	Institutional Revolutionary Party	2000–2002; 2002–2003	58th Congress
2003	Felipe Medina Santos	Institutional Revolutionary Party	2003–2006	59th Congress
2006	Jaime Espejel Lazcano	Party of the Democratic Revolution	2006–2009	60th Congress
2009	Eduardo Yáñez Montaño	Institutional Revolutionary Party	2009–2012	61st Congress
2012	Juan Manuel Carbajal Hernández	Institutional Revolutionary Party	2012–2015	62nd Congress
2015	Susana Osorno Belmont	Institutional Revolutionary Party	2015–2018	63rd Congress
2018	Vicente Onofre Vázquez	National Regeneration Movement	2018–2021	64th Congress
2021	Vicente Onofre Vázquez	National Regeneration Movement	2021–2024	65th Congress
2024	Anaís Miriam Burgos Hernández	National Regeneration Movement	2024–2027	66th Congress

== Presidential elections ==
State of Mexico's 33rd district
Election	District won by	Party or coalition	%
2018	Andrés Manuel López Obrador	Juntos Haremos Historia	62.8775
2024	Claudia Sheinbaum Pardo	Sigamos Haciendo Historia	72.1757
