= Felipe Medina Santos =

Mexican politician

- Born: 27 December 1948 (age 77); Chalco de Díaz Covarrubias, State of Mexico, Mexico
- Education: IPN
- Occupation: Politician
- Political party: PRI

Felipe Medina Santos (born 27 December 1948) is a Mexican politician affiliated with the Institutional Revolutionary Party (PRI).

He has served in the Chamber of Deputies twice: during the 55th Congress (1991–1994), for the State of Mexico's 15th district, and during the 59th Congress (2003–2006), for the State of Mexico's 33rd district.

He also served as municipal president of Chalco from 1979 to 1981 and 1994 to 1995.
