= Santa Catarina Ayotzingo =

Saint Catherine Ayotzingo Santa Catarina Ayotzingo
- Town & Municipality
- Saint Catherine Ayotzingo location in State of Mexico

- Communities in Chalco municipality
- Coordinates: 19°15′53″N 98°53′51″W
- Country: Mexico
- State: State of Mexico
- Region: Amecameca
- Metro area: Greater Mexico City
- Established: 10th Century

Area
  - Land: 219.22 km^{2} (84.64 sq mi)
  - Water: 0.00 km^{2} (0 sq mi)
- Elevation (of seat): 2,240 m (7,350 ft)

Population (2010)
  - Town: 10,702
- Time zone: UTC-6 (CST)
  - Summer (DST): UTC-5 (CDT)
- Postal code (of seat): 56610
- Area code: 55
- Demonym: Ayotzinca

Santa Catarina Ayotzingo is a town in the state of Mexico, that belongs to the municipality of Chalco and forms part of the Metropolitan Zone of the Valley of Mexico.

== Origin ==
Ayotzinco was the first name that was given by Chichimecas to the town when they founded it. Ayotzinco means “Where the turtles sunbathe”, in the Nahuatl language. Ayotzinco's exact date of founding is uncertain, but it is approximately 800 years old. When Spaniards arrived, they changed the name to “Ayotzingo” because of the pronunciation, as they did with many other words in Náhuatl.

Saint Catherine Ayotzingo was once a waterfront village on Lake Chalco, dependent since and along the colony and afterwards in independent Mexico of the cabecera municipal of Chalco. During the colonial period the church of Saint Catherine of Alexandria and an Augustinian mission were built, the main monuments of the municipality.

=== Location ===
Saint Catherine lies in a valley formed by the now-gone lake of Chalco, next to a mountain range southwest of the municipality of Chalco; according to the 2010 Census of Population and Houses by the National Institute of Statistics and Geography (INEGI), Saint Catherine Ayotzingo had a population that year of 10,702 inhabitants, of which 5,222 were men and 5,480 women.

== History ==
It originally was frequented by the nomadic Chichimeca tribe, who scavenged for their subsistence. At the height of the Aztec period Ayotzingo was populated by royalty and was the most important harbor in the region of the Lake of Chalco, where goods arrived from Chalco, Amecameca, Tlalmanalco, Mixquic, and even from Morelos state.

=== Mexican Revolution ===
In 1910, during the revolutionary movement, the municipality of Chalco saw several clashes; incursions by revolutionary forces were constant because of its proximity to Morelos and the political power vacuum. On 23 October 1911 revolutionary groups attacked San Pablo Atlazalpan and Ayotzingo, where they stole horses, arms, money, clothes and burned houses, the courthouse and the school for girls.

=== Che Guevara and Fidel Castro ===
Che Guevara and Fidel Castro trained in Santa Catarina Ayotzingo. According to local historian Rafael Pozos this town was a key to the triumph of the Cuban revolution and for the arrival of Fidel Castro to power. Likewise, he says, the final plans for the fight against Cuban dictator Fulgencio Batista that later took place in Cuba's Sierra Maestra were detailed in the guerrillas' training camps at the Santa Rosa ranch.

== Traditions and mores in Ayotzingo ==
=== Fiestas ===
Ayotzingo's neighbourhoods each has its own fiesta for the Catholic saint that gives his or her name to the respective neighbourhood.

=== Saint Catherine ===
Saint Catherine is the patron saint of the entire village and her celebration starts 25 November and lasts three days, ending on 28 November. At this fiesta for the whole of Ayotzingo there is a fair, mechanical games, processions, marotas or chinelos, and regional musical bands every day almost all day. This fiesta, which gave birth to examples of regional music such as Los Cardenales de Nuevo León, Los Cadetes de Linares, La Apuesta, the band Yaguaru, Los Askis, La Arrolladora Banda El Limón, Las Lamas, Grupo Liberación, Guardianes del Amor, Rayito Colombiano, Julio Preciado, Ramón Ayala, El Gigante de América (Bronco), Banda Pequeños Musical, Julión Álvarez, Aarón y su Grupo Ilusión, etc.

San Miguel Date of fiesta: 19 September.

Santiago Date of fiesta: 25 July.

- San Juan.

Date of fiesta: 24 June.

- Santa María

Date of fiesta: 15 August.

- Santa Cruz.

Date of fiesta: 3 May.

== Death of the Secretary of the Interior ==
On 11 November 2011, a helicopter accident killed Secretary of the Interior Francisco Blake Mora 4km from the town.
