= Katya Rodríguez-Vázquez =

Mexican computer scientist

Academic background
- Education: University of Sheffield
- Thesis: Multiobjective evolutionary algorithms in non-linear system identification (1999)

Katya Rodríguez-Vázquez is a Mexican computer scientist whose research involves genetic programming and its applications in system identification, the problem of reconstructing models of dynamical systems from measurements of their behavior. She is a researcher at the National Autonomous University of Mexico (UNAM), in the Instituto de Investigaciones en Matemáticas Aplicadas y Sistemas (IIMAS, the Institute of Research in Applied Mathematics and Systems).

== Education and career ==
Rodríguez-Vázquez earned a degree in computer engineering at UNAM in 1994. After working as a researcher in the UNAM faculty of engineering from 1993 to 1995, and teaching physics and mathematics at Colegio Kansas, a Mexican high school, she went to the University of Sheffield in England for graduate study, beginning in 1995. She completed her doctorate there in 1999, with the dissertation Multiobjective Evolutionary Algorithms in Non-Linear System Identification.

She returned to UNAM as a researcher in the Instituto de Investigaciones en Matemáticas Aplicadas y Sistemas in 1999.

== Selected publications ==
- Rodriguez-Vazquez, K.; Fonseca, C.M.; Fleming, P.J. (2004), "'Identifying the structure of nonlinear dynamic systems using multiobjective genetic programming", IEEE Transactions on Systems, Man, and Cybernetics - Part A: Systems and Humans, 34 (4): 531–545, Bibcode:2004ITSMA..34..531R, doi:10.1109/TSMCA.2004.826299, ISSN 1558-2426, S2CID 39308812
- Garro, Beatriz A.; Rodríguez, Katya; Vázquez, Roberto A. (1 January 2016), "Classification of DNA microarrays using artificial neural networks and ABC algorithm", Applied Soft Computing, 38: 548–560, doi:10.1016/j.asoc.2015.10.002, ISSN 1568-4946
- Rodríguez-Vázquez, K.; Fleming, P.J. (1998), "Multi-objective genetic programming for nonlinear system identification", Electronics Letters, 34 (9): 930, Bibcode:1998ElL....34..930R, doi:10.1049/el:19980632

== Recognition ==
Rodríguez-Vázquez is a member of the Mexican Academy of Sciences. UNAM gave her their Sor Juana Inés de la Cruz Recognition in 2014.
