= Margarita Rosado =

Mexican astronomer

Margarita Eugenia del Socorro Rosado Solís is a Mexican astronomer who studies the motion of nebulae, galaxies, and the interstellar medium, including the use of interferometry and the construction of scanning interferometers, kinematic calculations, and computer simulation. She is a professor and researcher in the National Autonomous University of Mexico (UNAM) Institute of Astronomy.

== Education and career ==
Rosado began her studies in physics at the Meritorious Autonomous University of Puebla, and completed a bachelor's degree in physics at UNAM in 1971. For graduate study she traveled to Paris, where she earned a Diplome d'Etudes Approfondies (master's degree) in 1976 and a Doctorat de troisième cycle in 1977 through Paris Diderot University.

On returning to Mexico, she became a researcher in the UNAM Institute of Astronomy.

== Recognition ==
Rosado is a member of the Mexican Academy of Sciences. She was a 2005 winner of UNAM's Sor Juana Inés de la Cruz Recognition.
