= Miriam Peña Cárdenas =

Chilean astronomer

Miriam del Carmen Peña Cárdenas is a Chilean astronomer and cosmochemist whose research includes the chemical composition of interstellar clouds including H II regions and the planetary nebulae surrounding Wolf–Rayet stars. She is a professor and researcher at the National Autonomous University of Mexico (UNAM), in the UNAM Institute of Astronomy.

== Education ==
Peña began her university studies in Chile, studying engineering, but moved to the National Autonomous University of Mexico to complete her bachelor's degree, and remained there for her graduate studies.

== Recognition ==
Peña is a member of the Mexican Academy of Sciences. She was a 2007 winner of UNAM's Sor Juana Inés de la Cruz Recognition.
