= Yolanda Gómez =

Mexican astronomer

Yolanda Gómez Castellanos (1962–2012) was a Mexican astronomer who studied interstellar clouds including planetary nebulae and compact H II regions. She became known for the discovery of water vapor through emissions from astrophysical masers associated with OH/IR stars and planetary nebulae, evidence for the extremely recent formation of the associated nebula.

== Life ==
Gómez was born in Mexico City, in 1962. She studied physics at the National Autonomous University of Mexico (UNAM), earning a bachelor's degree in 1985 and completing her doctorate in 1990.

After postdoctoral research at the Harvard–Smithsonian Center for Astrophysics, she became a researcher at UNAM in 1993, first in the Institute of Astronomy and after 2001 as a founding member of the Center for Radio Astronomy and Astrophysics of the Morelia campus of UNAM.

She died on 16 February 2012.

== Recognition ==
Gómez was a member of the Mexican Academy of Sciences. In 2005, UNAM gave her the Sor Juana Inés de la Cruz Recognition. In 2008 the government of Michoacán gave her the State Prize for the Dissemination of Science and Technology.

== Selected publications ==
- Gómez, Y.; Rodríguez, L. F.; Contreras, M. E.; Moran, J. M. (April 1994), "Anomalous water masers in OH/IR stars.", Revista Mexicana de Astronomía y Astrofísica, 28: 97–102, Bibcode:1994RMxAA..28...97G
- Rodriguez, Luis F.; Garay, Guido; Curiel, Salvador; Ramirez, Solange; Torrelles, Jose M.; Gomez, Yolanda; Velazquez, Arturo (July 1994), "Cepheus A HW2: a powerful thermal radio jet", The Astrophysical Journal, 430: L65, Bibcode:1994ApJ...430L..65R, doi:10.1086/187439
- Miranda, L. F.; Gómez, Y.; Anglada, G.; Torrelles, J. M. (November 2001), "Water-maser emission from a planetary nebula with a magnetized torus", Nature, 414 (6861): 284–286, Bibcode:2001Natur.414..284M, doi:10.1038/35104518, PMID 11713522
