= Sor Juana Inés de la Cruz Recognition =

Mexican academic award

- Awarded for: Teaching, research, or the dissemination of culture
- Sponsored by: National Autonomous University of Mexico
- Date: 2003
- Venue: Teatro Juan Ruiz de Alarcón
- Country: Mexico

The Sor Juana Inés de la Cruz Recognition (Spanish: Reconocimiento Sor Juana Inés de la Cruz) is an award given since 2003 by the National Autonomous University of Mexico (UNAM). It is presented to women of the institution for achievements in "teaching, research, or the dissemination of culture." Consisting of a medal and a diploma with the image of Sor Juana Inés de la Cruz, it is awarded annually in conjunction with International Women's Day.

The technical or internal council of each Baccalaureate school, faculty, research institute, etc. submits nominations of outstanding university students to the UNAM general secretariat. On or about March 8, a ceremony is held at the Teatro Juan Ruiz de Alarcón in which medals and diplomas are awarded.

The requirements to receive the medal include having a definitive academic appointment at UNAM, not having received the award previously, excelling in the proposed fields, and being nominated by a technical or internal council.

== List of ceremonies ==
Year	Number of recipients	Notable recipients	References
2003		Silvia Torres-Peimbert	
2004		Deborah Dultzin	
2005		Yolanda Gómez; Margarita Rosado; Cristina Verde	
2006		Teresita de Barbieri	
2007	76	Miriam Peña Cárdenas	
2008			
2009		Julieta Norma Fierro Gossman	
2010	77	Lucía Álvarez; Clementina Díaz y de Ovando; Mercedes de la Garza Camino; Patricia León Mejía; María Elena Medina-Mora Icaza	
2011	75	Rosa Beltrán	
2012	77		
2013	80		
2014	79	Myriam Mondragón Ceballos; Katya Rodríguez-Vázquez; Ek del Val de Gortari	
2015	79	Magdalena González Sánchez	
2016	82	Alma Rosa Sánchez; Ana Flisser Steinbruch; Gilda Waldman	
2017	79	Antígona Segura	
2018	82		
2019	80	Anastazia Teresa Banaszak; Yolanda López Vidal	
2020	79	Martha Gabriela Gaxiola Cortés; María Teresa Uriarte	
2021	81		
2022	79		
2023	83		
