= Arieh Dulzin =

- אריה דולצ'ין
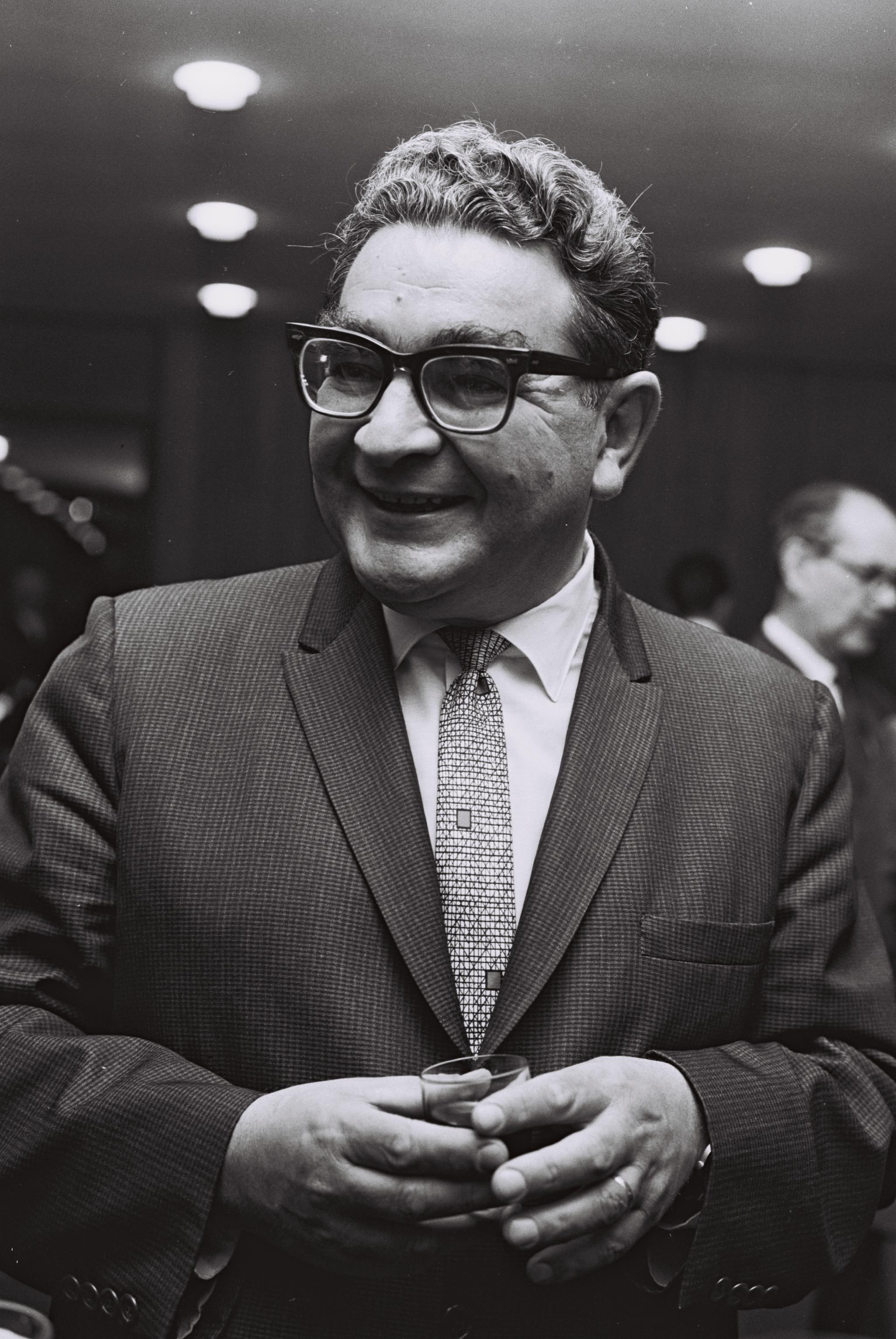
- Dulzin in 1964

Ministerial roles
- 1969–1970: Minister without Portfolio

Personal details
- Born: 31 March 1913; Minsk, Russian Empire
- Died: 13 September 1989 (aged 76); Haifa, Israel

Arieh Leon Dulzin (Hebrew: אריה לאון דולצ'ין; 31 March 1913 – 13 September 1989) was a Zionist activist who served as a Minister without Portfolio in the Israeli government between December 1969 and August 1970, though he was never a member of the Knesset.

== Biography ==
Dulzin was born in Minsk in the Russian Empire (now Belarus). In 1928 he emigrated to Mexico and between 1938 and 1942 he was president of the Mexican branch of the Zionist Organisation. While in Mexico, he married painter Fredzia Kessler, who had emigrated from Poland as a child. Their daughter Deborah became a noted astronomer.

In 1956 Dulzin moved to Israel but his wife and daughter remained in Mexico. He later remarried and had another two children. After arriving in Israel he worked for the Jewish Agency. He headed the economic department and investment bureau until 1965, then served as head of immigration, absorption and resettlement, and became treasurer in 1968 to 1978. He joined the Liberal Party, and on 15 December 1969 Golda Meir appointed him to her cabinet as a Minister without Portfolio. However, he resigned on 6 August 1970 when Gahal (the Herut–Liberal bloc) pulled out of the coalition. Between 1978 and 1987 he served as president of the World Zionist Organization.
