= Deborah Dultzin =

Mexican astrophysicist (1945–2026)

Deborah Dultzin Kessler (Note: In this Mexican name, the surname is Dultzin and the second or maternal family name is Kessler.) (also published as Deborah Dultzin-Hacyan; 9 October 1945 – 30 March 2026) was a Mexican astrophysicist specializing in quasars, blazars, active galactic nuclei, and supermassive black holes. She was a professor and researcher at the Institute of Astronomy of the National Autonomous University of Mexico (UNAM).

== Life and career ==
Dultzin was the daughter of Arieh Dulzin, a Zionist activist from Minsk in the Russian Empire and Soviet Union (now Belarus) who emigrated to Mexico in 1928, and to Israel in 1956. Her mother was Fredzia Kessler, an oil painter from Warsaw, Poland, who had also emigrated to Mexico as a child in 1929. She was born in Monterrey in 1945, and grew up with her mother after her father left Mexico.

As a high school student and later at the UNAM, she loved mathematics but struggled with physics. Nevertheless, she completed a degree in physics in order to aim for a career in astronomy. Her anti-American political stance, and the influence of Guillermo Haro, persuaded her to continue her studies in the Soviet Union, where she went next with the support of the Secretariat of Foreign Affairs. She earned a master's degree in astrophysics at Moscow State University, working with Yakov Zeldovich, but for personal reasons returned to Mexico without completing a doctorate, at that time taking a position as a researcher at UNAM.

At the suggestion of a colleague on a sabbatical visit to Paris, she compiled a doctoral thesis based on her existing published work, and defended it at the Sorbonne University in 1986. Her dissertation was Spectrophotometrie des noyaux actifs des galaxies [Spectrophotometry of active galactic nuclei], directed by Jean Heyvaerts.

Dultzin died on 30 March 2026, at the age of 80.

== Recognition ==
Dultzin was a member of the Mexican Academy of Sciences. She was the 2010 winner of the Ciudad Capital Heberto Castillo award. In 2016, the UNAM gave her the National University Award. She is also a winner of the UNAM Sor Juana Inés de la Cruz Recognition.

In 2007, an international symposium was held in honor of her 60th birthday.
