= Eduardo Yáñez Montaño =

Mexican politician (born 1954)

- Born: 23 February 1954 (age 72); State of Mexico, Mexico
- Occupation: Politician
- Political party: PRI

Eduardo Yáñez Montaño (born 23 February 1954) is a Mexican politician from the Institutional Revolutionary Party (PRI). In the 2009 mid-terms he was elected to the Chamber of Deputies to represent the State of Mexico's 33rd district during the 61st session of Congress (2009–2012).
