= Jaime Espejel Lazcano =

Mexican politician

- Born: 9 June 1959 (age 66); State of Mexico, Mexico
- Occupation: Politician
- Political party: PRD

Jaime Espejel Lazcano (born 9 June 1959) is a Mexican politician affiliated with the Party of the Democratic Revolution (PRD). In the 2006 general election he was elected to the Chamber of Deputies to represent the State of Mexico's 33rd district during the 60th session of Congress.
