= Antígona Segura =

Mexican physicist and astrobiologist

- Antígona Segura Peralta
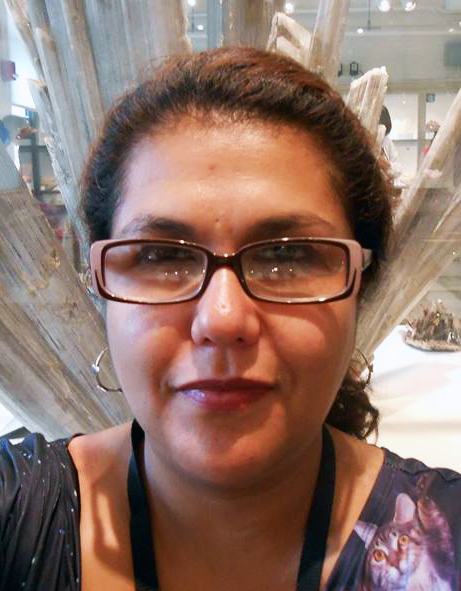
- Born: September 20, 1971 (age 54); Mexico City, Mexico
- Education: Universidad Autónoma de San Luis Potosí (BS); Universidad Nacional Autónoma de México (MS); Universidad Nacional Autónoma de México (PhD)
- Scientific career
- Fields: Physics; Astrobiology
- Workplaces: Instituto de Ciencias Nucleares, Universidad Nacional Autónoma de México

Antígona Segura Peralta (born September 20, 1971) is a Mexican physicist and astrobiologist. Since 2006, she has been a researcher at the Institute of Nuclear Sciences of the National Autonomous University of Mexico (UNAM) and collaborator at the NASA Astrobiology Institute. As a feminist she actively advocates for the inclusion of women in the exact sciences, mathematics, and engineering. Segura has participated in several activities in and outside UNAM defending women's rights; she was awarded with the 2021 Hermila Galindo medal by the Congress of Mexico City.

== Academic training ==
Antígona Segura graduated with a degree in Theoretical Physics from the Autonomous University of San Luis Potosí. There she met the astronomer Miguel Ángel Herrera, with whom she conducted scientific research in a project directed by Arcadio Poveda. In 1997, she completed a master's degree in Astronomy at the UNAM Institute of Astronomy, and the same year she obtained a diploma in Science Communication from UNAM's General Directorate for Scientific Outreach.

She earned her doctorate in the Earth Sciences postgraduate program at UNAM with the thesis Fijación de nitrógeno por relámpagos volcánicos en el Marte primitivo (Nitrogen Fixation by Volcanic Lightning on Primitive Mars), advised by Rafael Navarro González. From 2005 to 2006, she worked as a postdoctoral researcher at the Jet Propulsion Laboratory (JPL) associated with the California Institute of Technology (Caltech).

== Career and research ==
Segura's research is focused on the study of planetary atmospheres and the remote detection of signs of life. She also collaborates on a multidisciplinary project on the formation and conditions of the early solar system. She has determined possible sources of energy for the generation of fixed nitrogen on primitive Mars, proposing volcanic lightning as a new source.

Her studies on biosignatures on habitable planets around M dwarf stars reopened the debate about the habitability of planets that revolve around these types of stars, and have been used to argue in favor of astronomical observation programs to better understand the processes that generate the chromospheric activity of the M dwarfs. Some examples are: Habitable Zones and M Dwarf Activity Across Time (HAZMAT), the program of observations of Proxima Centauri with the MOST telescope, the program for the detection and characterization of planets around M dwarfs using echoes of light, and the MUSCLES Treasury Survey.

Her research work has been developed at various institutions, such as the UNAM Institute of Nuclear Sciences, the NASA Jet Propulsion Laboratory, Pennsylvania State University, and the UNAM Institute of Astronomy. In addition, she is a science communicator, has worked at the news agency of the Mexican Academy of Sciences, has written for the UNAM magazine ¿Cómo ves?, and hosted the weekly radio program Hacia el Nuevo Milenio (Towards the New Millennium) on Radio Red AM. She frequently gives talks to diverse audiences about astrobiology.

Antígona Segura was hired by the UNAM Institute of Nuclear Sciences in 2006. Currently, she is the only female researcher working in the Plasma Physics and Interaction of Radiation with Matter Department.

== Activism ==
Along with her scientific research, Segura has worked for women's human rights. She has focused on academic spaces that have been masculinized, like the Institute of Nuclear Sciences. In 2016, Segura was the only female candidate competing for the direction of the Institute of Nuclear Sciences, and was the only candidate that proposed actions against gender inequality.

Antígona Segura was sanctioned by the National Autonomous University of Mexico in 2018, after she advocated for a female student who was the victim of a sexual assault by a fellow student.

In 2022, Antígona Segura was awarded with the Hermila Galindo Medal "for promoting women's equal access to the labor force." Two hundred people signed a petition requesting that her advocacy for women's rights be recognized.

== Awards and recognitions ==
- Hermila Galindo 2021 Medal
- Honorable Mention in obtaining the degree of Doctor of Science in the area of spatial physics, UNAM
- Alfonso Caso Medal given to the best postgraduate students, UNAM
- Member of the editorial board for the journal Astrobiology, 2010–2014
- President of the Mexican Society of Astrobiology, 2011–2013
- Member of the International Astronomical Union, 2015–present
- Sor Juana Inés de la Cruz Recognition, UNAM, 2017

== Publications ==
=== Thesis ===
- Segura Peralta, Antígona (2001). Fijación de nitrógeno por relámpagos volcánicos en el Marte primitivo [Nitrogen Fixation by Volcanic Lightning on Primitive Mars] (Thesis) (in Spanish). National Autonomous University of Mexico. Archived from the original on May 31, 2019.

=== Books ===
- Tiempo de elegir sin miedo, Memorias de una astrobióloga (2016), Editorial Piedra Bezoar
- Souza, Valeria; Segura, Antígona; Foster, Jamie S. (2020). Astrobiology and Cuatro Ciénegas Basin as an analog of early Earth. Springer. ISBN 9783030460877.

=== Selected articles ===
- "Ozone concentrations and ultraviolet fluxes on Earth-like planets around other stars" (2003)
- "Biosignatures from Earth-like planets around M dwarfs" (2005)
- Segura, Antígona; Navarro González, Rafael (2005). "Nitrogen fixation on early Mars by volcanic lightning and other sources". Geophysical Research Letters. 32 (5): L05203. Bibcode:2005GeoRL..32.5203S. doi:10.1029/2004gl021910. ISSN 0094-8276. S2CID 129749016.
- "A reappraisal of the habitability of planets around M dwarf stars" (2007)
- "M stars as targets for terrestrial exoplanet searches and biosignature detection" (2007)
