= Carlos Bello Otero =

Mexican politician

- Born: 9 August 1966 (age 59); Tecpán de Galeana, Guerrero, Mexico
- Occupation: Politician
- Political party: PAN

Carlos Bello Otero (born 9 August 1966) is a Mexican politician from the National Action Party (PAN).

He has been elected to the Chamber of Deputies twice: in the 2009 mid-terms, for the State of Mexico's 15th district, and in the 2015 mid-terms, as a plurinominal deputy for the fifth region.
