= Alejandro Landero Gutiérrez =

Mexican politician

- Born: 3 May 1975 (age 51); State of Mexico, Mexico
- Education: Panamerican University
- Occupation: Politician
- Political party: PAN

Alejandro Landero Gutiérrez (born 3 May 1975) is a Mexican politician affiliated with the National Action Party (PAN). In the 2006 general election he was elected to the Chamber of Deputies to represent the State of Mexico's 15th district during the 60th session of Congress.
