= Cristina Verde =

Mexican process engineer

María Cristina Verde Rodarte is a Mexican process engineer and control theorist whose research concerns the robust control of hydraulic systems: modeling industrial processes that involve liquid flow through pipes, monitoring those processes, and detecting and isolating leaks. She is a researcher and professor at the National Autonomous University of Mexico (UNAM), in the faculty of engineering.

== Education and career ==
Verde was born in Mexico City, on 15 February 1950. She studied electronic and communications engineering at the Instituto Politécnico Nacional, graduating in 1973, and earning a master's degree through CINVESTAV in 1974. She worked as a professor and researcher at CINVESTAV from 1971 to 1978.

In 1979 she began graduate study in electrical engineering at the University of Duisburg in Germany. She completed her PhD in 1984 and returned to Mexico as a researcher in the UNAM Engineering Institute. She became a professor there in 1986.

== Recognition ==
Verde is a member of the Mexican Academy of Sciences. UNAM gave her their Sor Juana Inés de la Cruz Recognition in 2005.
