= High Altitude Water Cherenkov Experiment =

Gamma-ray and cosmic ray observatory in Puebla, Mexico

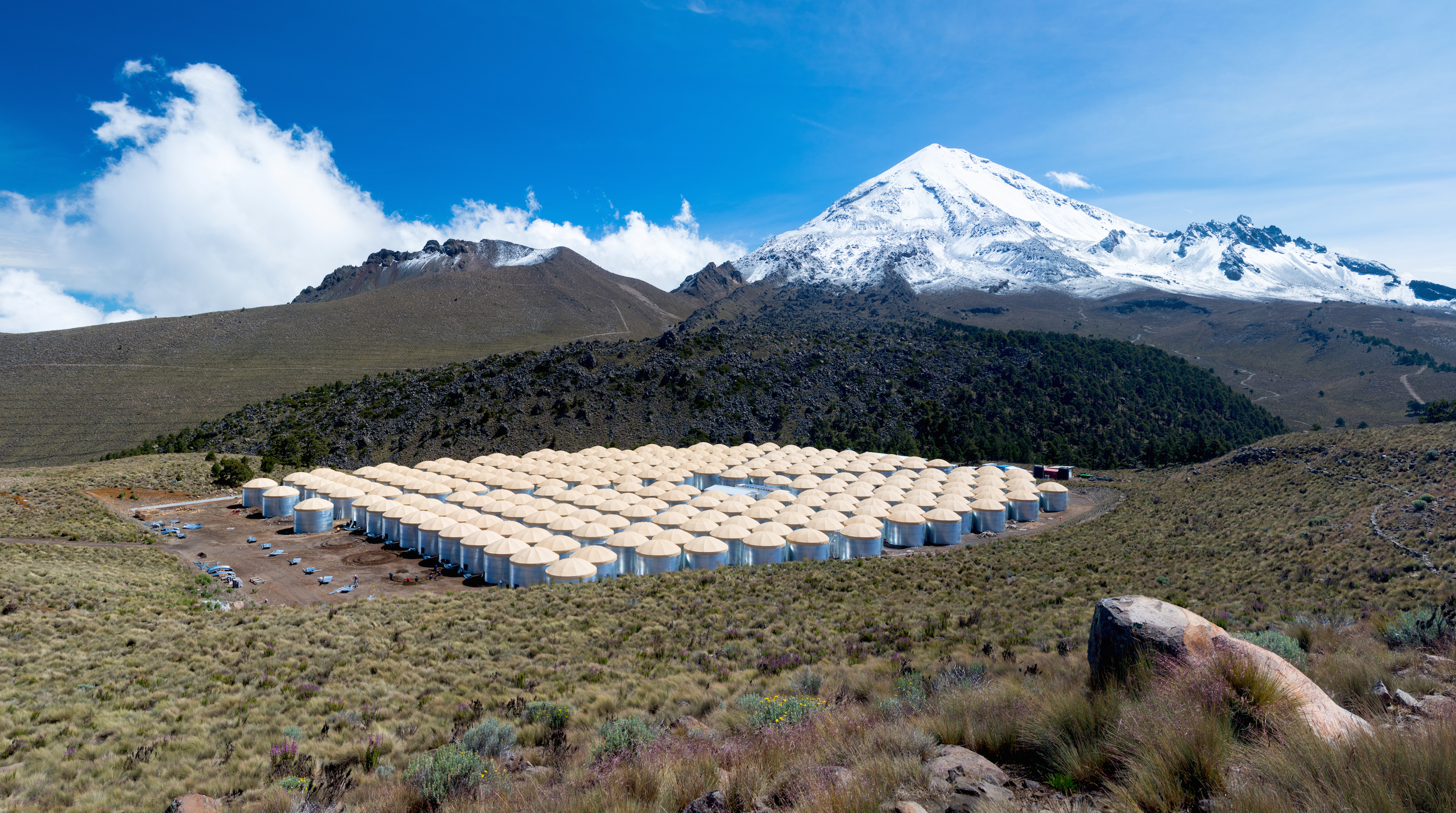
HAWC August 14, 2014

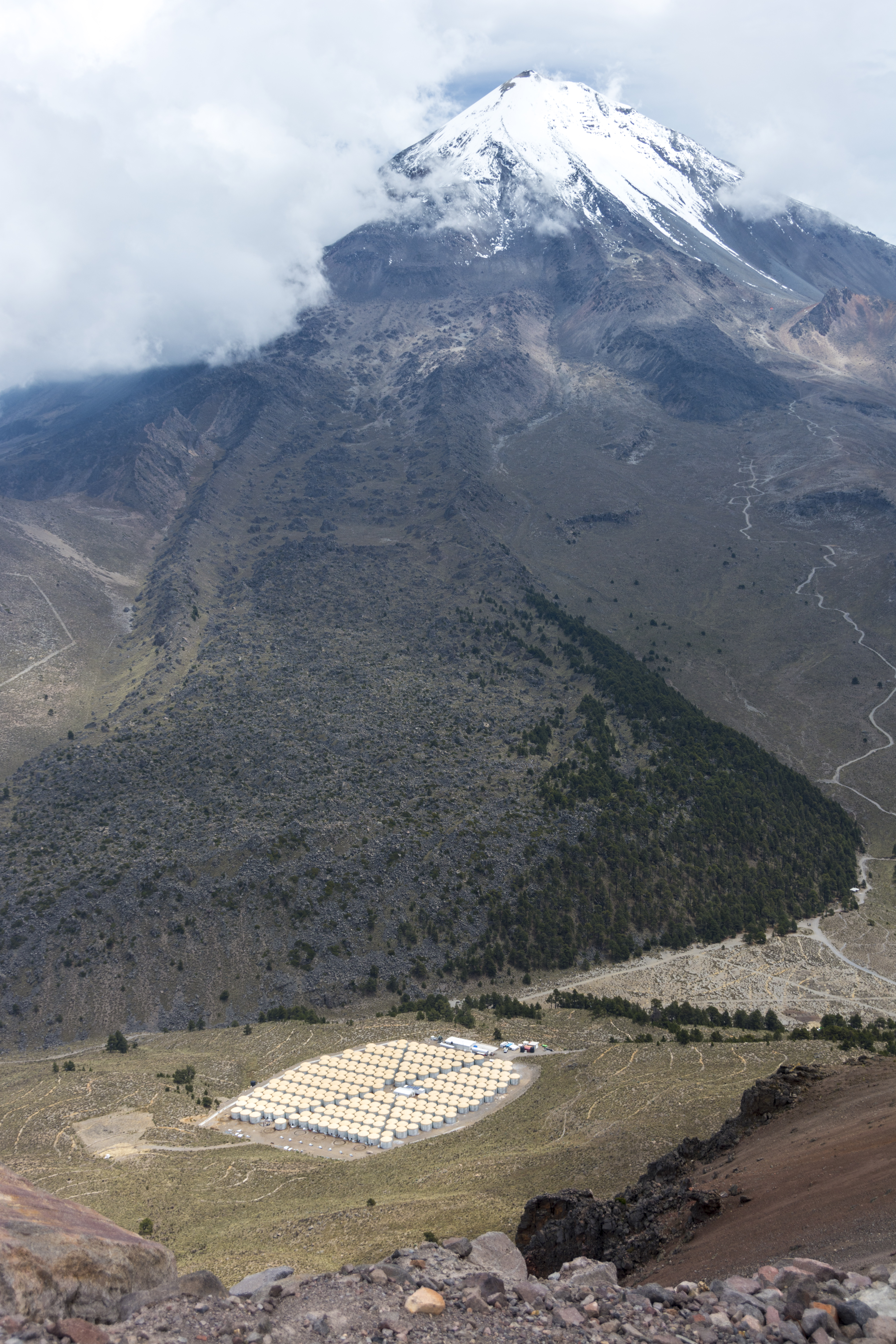
HAWC with the Pico de Orizaba in the background, August 2014

The High Altitude Water Cherenkov Experiment or High Altitude Water Cherenkov Observatory (also known as HAWC) is a gamma-ray and cosmic ray observatory located on the flanks of the Sierra Negra volcano in the Mexican state of Puebla at an altitude of 4100 meters, at 18°59′41″N 97°18′30.6″W. HAWC is the successor to the Milagro gamma-ray observatory in New Mexico, which was also a gamma-ray observatory based around the principle of detecting gamma-rays indirectly using the water Cherenkov method.

HAWC is a joint collaboration between a large number of American and Mexican universities and scientific institutions, including the University of Maryland, the National Autonomous University of Mexico, the National Institute of Astrophysics, Optics and Electronics, Los Alamos National Laboratory, NASA/Goddard Space Flight Center, the Autonomous University of the State of Hidalgo (UAEH), the University of California, Santa Cruz, Michigan Technological University, Michigan State University, Benemérita Universidad Autónoma de Puebla, the Universidad de Guadalajara, the University of Utah, the University of New Mexico, the University of Wisconsin–Madison and the Georgia Institute of Technology.

== Overview ==
The HAWC Gamma-ray Observatory is a wide field of view, continuously operating, TeV gamma-ray telescope that explores the origin of cosmic rays, study the acceleration of particles in extreme physical environments, and search for new TeV physics. HAWC was built at an elevation of 4100 m above sea level in Mexico by a collaboration of 15 US and 12 Mexican institutions, and it is operated with funding from the US National Science Foundation, the US Department of Energy and CONACyT (Mexico's science funding agency). HAWC was completed in spring of 2015, and consists of an array of 300 water Cherenkov detectors. It is designed to be more than an order of magnitude more sensitive than its predecessor, Milagro.

HAWC monitors the northern sky and makes coincident observations with other wide field of view observatories. HAWC works with other observatories, such as VERITAS, HESS, MAGIC, IceCube and later, CTA, so they can make overlapping multi-wavelength and multi-messenger observations, and to maximize coincident observations with the Fermi Gamma-ray Space Telescope (Fermi).

HAWC has the ability to detect a large ensemble of gamma-ray sources, measuring their spectra and variability to characterize TeV scale acceleration mechanisms. In a one-year survey, HAWC can perform a deep, unbiased survey of the TeV gamma-ray with a 50 mCrab sensitivity at 5σ. HAWC will observe hard-spectrum (high photon energies) Galactic sources in the TeV with a sensitivity similar to that of Fermi in the GeV, detect diffuse emission from regions of the Galactic plane, have sensitivity to see known TeV active galactic nuclei and the brightest known GeV gamma-ray bursts, and represents a large enough step in sensitivity to likely discover new phenomena. Because HAWC has a 2 steradian instantaneous field of view, it will observe diffuse gamma-ray emission from the plane of the galaxy over a broad range of galactic longitudes reaching to the Galactic Center.

In September 2015, a Laboratory Directed Research and Development grant was awarded to Brenda Dingus of Los Alamos National Laboratory to improve HAWC's effective area and sensitivity by adding an array of outrigger tanks, surrounding the larger central tanks. Due to the greater size of particle showers created by high energy cosmic rays, increasing the area of the detector will increase the sensitivity of the detector. The outriggers were predicted to increase the sensitivity and effective area of HAWC by 2 to 4 times for particles with energies above 10 TeV. The outrigger array was completed in early 2018, a year later than expected.

== Principle of operation ==
HAWC detects electromagnetic radiation from air showers produced by high energy cosmic rays which hit the Earth's atmosphere. HAWC is sensitive to showers produced by primary cosmic rays with energies between 100 GeV and 50 TeV.

Cherenkov radiation occurs when charged particles travel through a medium at a speed faster than the speed of light in that medium. High-energy gamma rays, upon striking the upper atmosphere, can create positron-electron pairs that move at great speeds. The residual effect of these particles traveling through the atmosphere can result in a cascading shower of particles and photons that are aimed towards the surface at predictable angles.

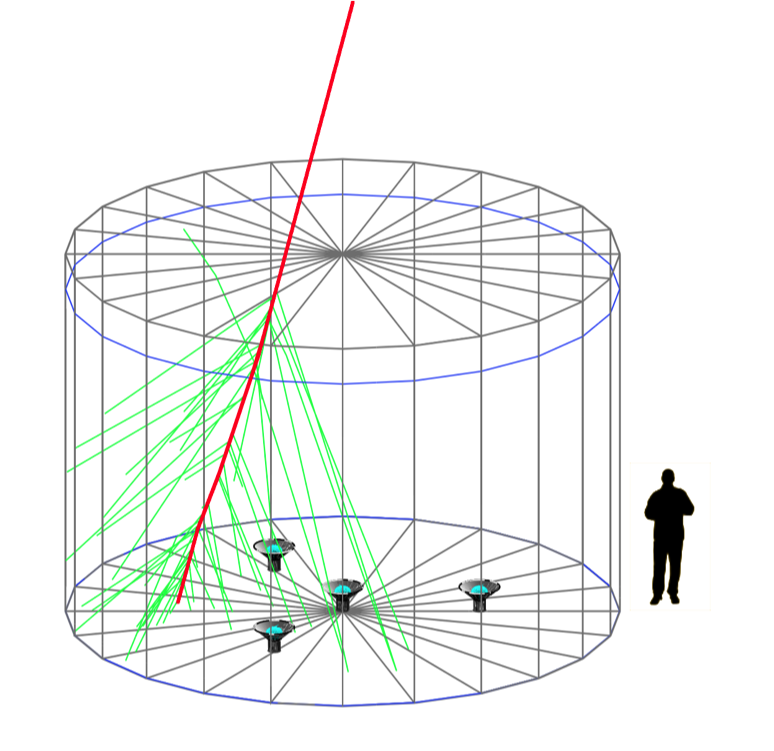
Tank sketch

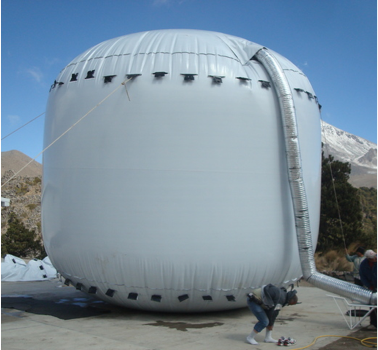
Bladder

HAWC consists of large metal tanks, 7.3 m wide by 5 m high, containing a light-tight bladder holding 188,000 liters of water. Inside are four photomultiplier tubes (3-8" and 1-10" high QE). High-energy particles striking the water result in Cherenkov light that is detected by the photomultiplier tubes. HAWC uses the difference in arrival times of the light at different tanks to measure the direction of the primary particle. The pattern of light allows for discrimination between primary (hadrons) and gamma-rays. From this, scientists can map the sky using gamma-rays.

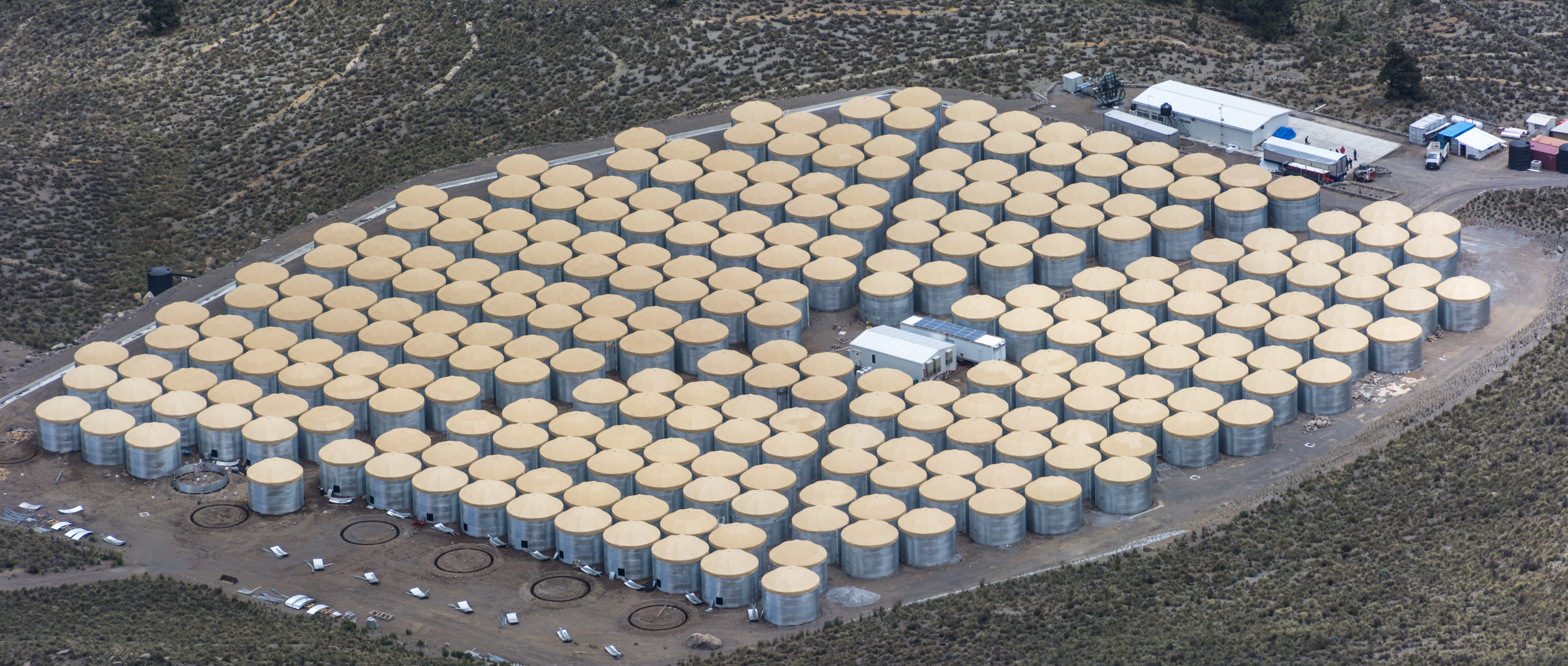
Closeup of HAWC tanks. Each tank contains circa 188,000 liters of water and four photomultiplier tubes.

== Performance goals ==
HAWC will:

- Detect a large sample of localized gamma-ray sources and measure their spectra and variability to characterize TeV scale acceleration mechanisms from an ensemble of sources.
- Have a 50 mCrab sensitivity at 5σ in a one-year survey. HAWC will observe hard-spectrum Galactic sources at TeV energies with a sensitivity similar to that of Fermi Gamma-ray Space Telescope at GeV energies, detect diffuse emission from regions of the Galactic plane, have sensitivity to see known TeV active galactic nuclei (AGN) and the brightest known GeV gamma-ray bursts (GRBs), and represents a large enough step in sensitivity to likely discover new phenomena.
- Measure the spectrum and spatially characterize the diffuse TeV emission from the Milky Way galaxy to probe the cosmic ray flux in other regions of the galaxy.
- Observe extragalactic transient sources, such as GRBs and AGN, and notify other observers promptly so they can make multi-wavelength and multi-messenger observations.
- Perform a deep, unbiased survey of the TeV gamma-ray and cosmic-ray sky to understand TeV astrophysical sources sufficiently to search for new fundamental physics effects.
- Have a 2 steradian (sr) instantaneous field of view to allow observations of diffuse gamma-ray emission from the plane of the Galaxy over a broad range of Galactic longitudes reaching to the Galactic center. This wide field of view also enables HAWC to observe phenomena such as GRBs, which are rare, from unknown directions, and last only a few seconds. HAWC can thus discover new TeV sources and observe flaring in known sources that may have no low energy counterpart, i.e. orphan TeV flares from AGN that are signatures of hadronic acceleration.
- Operate for at least five years with >90% duty cycle, which will give it sufficient exposure to measure the low fluxes at higher energies and long enough to detect and monitor a variety of transient sources.
- Have a median energy below 1 TeV for a Crab-like spectrum, which is needed to observe extragalactic sources that are attenuated at high energies by pair production with intergalactic photons.
- Have a >95% hadronic background rejection for E >10 TeV by distinguishing the penetrating particles in the hadron-initiated background showers from the gamma-ray initiated electromagnetic showers.
- Have an angular resolution of <0.5^{o} for E >1 TeV and 0.25^{o} for E >10 TeV. This resolution improves HAWC's flux sensitivity by rejecting the isotropic background and provides source localizations that are sufficient for targeting by other detectors and for determining the spatial morphology of the source. HAWC may also discover extended sources that can trigger deep observations by IACTs.

== Science goals ==
=== Galactic sources at high energies ===
The origin of the cosmic radiation has been a mystery since its discovery by Victor Hess in 1912. The cosmic-ray energy spectrum extends from a few GeV to above 10^{20} eV. As yet there is no experimental proof of the transition from Galactic to extragalactic cosmic rays, though it is believed that cosmic rays below about 10^{17.5} eV are of Galactic origin. While there is a consensus that supernovae (SN) explosions accelerate cosmic rays up to energies of ~10^{15} eV, experimental evidence has been difficult to obtain. The theoretical arguments are based upon the energy released in SN being sufficient to maintain the observed cosmic rays in the Galaxy, and the creation of strong shocks by SN enabling first order Fermi acceleration. Thus the tasks for future experiments are to confirm that supernovae are sites of the acceleration of hadronic cosmic rays up to the knee, and to determine the sources of the Galactic cosmic rays above 10^{15} eV.

=== Galactic diffuse emission ===
The diffuse gamma radiation from our Galaxy also probes the origin of cosmic rays. This radiation is due to the interaction of hadronic cosmic rays with interstellar gas, and subsequent decay of neutral pions, and the interaction of high-energy electrons with gas and radiation fields (radio, microwave, infrared, optical, UV and magnetic). If the distribution of matter and radiation is known through other measurements, knowledge of the diffuse emission allows one to measure the cosmic-ray flux and spectrum throughout the Galaxy. This information can be used to determine the regions within the Galaxy where particle acceleration has recently occurred.

=== Transient emission from AGN and the Crab ===
Over 20 Active Galactic Nuclei (AGN) have been detected in very high energy (VHE) gamma rays, and extreme flares of up to 50 times the quiescent flux have been observed. Gamma rays are produced via interactions of the high-energy electrons and/or protons with lower energy photons. There exist several models to explain the source of photons including: synchrotron emission by the same population of electrons; radiation from the accretion disk; and cosmic microwave background photons. Simultaneous observations using multiple wavelengths and multi-messenger approaches are required to distinguish among these models. Monitoring at VHE energies is an efficient mechanism to initiate such observations because the highest energy gamma rays exhibit the most extreme variability and probe the highest energy particles. HAWC will have the sensitivity to detect strong flares, such as those that have been observed from Markarian 421, at greater than 10σ in under 30 minutes.

=== Gamma-ray bursts ===
The Fermi satellite has now observed both long and short gamma-ray bursts that emit multi-GeV gamma rays. No high energy cut off is observed in any of these GRBs, and the highest energy gamma ray observed in the three brightest bursts were emitted (i.e. corrected for the observed redshift) at energies of 70, 60, 94, and 61 GeV in GRBs 080916C, 090510, 090902B, and 090926 respectively. The highest energy gamma-rays require a bulk Lorentz factor of the outflow of nearly 1000 in order to have the rest-frame energies and photon densities be low enough to avoid attenuation by pair production interactions. The Fermi-LAT observations show the most intense GeV emission occurs promptly, and also extends longer than the emission at lower energies. A wide field of view, high duty factor observatory, such as HAWC, is required to observe this prompt emission and determine its extent at high energies especially for a burst such as 090510, in which the prompt emission was less than half a second in duration.

HAWC has the sensitivity to continue these observations into the VHE range. The effective area of HAWC at 100 GeV (~100m^{2}) is more than 100 times that of the Fermi-LAT.

=== Cosmic rays at TeV energies ===
HAWC is a very sensitive detector for TeV cosmic rays. The large number of cosmic rays detected with HAWC forms an undesirable background in the search for gamma-ray sources, but it also permits precise measurements of small deviations from isotropy in the cosmic-ray flux. Over the last few years, cosmic-ray detectors in the northern and southern hemisphere have found anisotropy in the arrival direction distribution of TeV cosmic rays at the per-mille level. Since we expect the arrival directions of charged particles at these energies to be completely scrambled by Galactic magnetic fields, these deviations are surprising and imply that the propagation of cosmic rays from their sources to us is not understood. Mapping the arrival direction distribution of cosmic rays to study the anisotropy with increased sensitivity is a major science goal for HAWC.

=== Fundamental physics ===
High-energy astrophysical observations have the unique potential to explore fundamental physics. However, deriving fundamental physics from the astrophysical observations is complex and requires a deep understanding of the astrophysical sources. The astrophysics background must be understood in order to determine the deviations from this background due to new physics. In some cases, astronomers can help with the understanding of the astrophysical background, such as using supernovae as standard candles to measure dark energy. However, high-energy physicists will have to detect and explain high energy astrophysical phenomena in order to derive the fundamental physics. The HAWC deep survey of the TeV gamma-ray sky will provide an unbiased picture necessary to characterize the properties of the astrophysical sources in order to search for new fundamental physics effects. Examples of HAWC investigations include:

1. Constraining the existence of nearby dark matter. HAWC's unbiased survey of 2π sr of the TeV sky allows searches known and unknown dwarf spheroidal satellites of our galaxy. The number of satellites increases with decreasing mass so there could be very nearby clumps of dark matter, which would therefore have higher gamma-ray fluxes, but might not have optical counterparts. The known dwarf spheroidal galaxies have extents of up to ~1 degree which is well matched to HAWC's angular resolution of <0.5^{o}. A stacked analysis of these satellites would improve the limit because all will have the same gamma-ray spectra.
2. Testing Lorentz invariance with transient gamma-ray observations. Many quantum gravity theories predict that the speed of light depends upon the energy of the photon as: Δc/c = -(E/M_{QGn})^{n} where n=1 or 2. While M_{QG} may be the Planck mass (2.4 × 10^{18} GeV), some theories predict much smaller mass scales. For theories where n=1, the Fermi-LAT collaboration has set limits above the Planck mass, and HAWC will have similar sensitivity if a GRB is detected. For theories where n=2, the higher energy sensitivity of HAWC will lead to limits roughly an order of magnitude higher mass scale than is possible with Fermi-LAT.
3. Measuring the attenuation of astrophysical sources due to interactions with the extragalactic background light (EBL). HAWC will enable multiple sources to be observed in various flaring states to understand the intrinsic TeV spectrum. Current constraints on the EBL make a conservative assumption of a very hard intrinsic spectrum and are very close to the maximum allowed from galaxy counts. These observations have led to postulations of the existence of axions in order to reduce the attenuation of TeV emission from EBL.
4. Searching for exotic signals such as massive relic particles, e.g. supersymmetry Q-balls, and tau neutrinos. Special triggers will be developed, allowing HAWC to search for the slow moving and high dE/dx Q-balls and the horizontal air showers produced by tau neutrinos interacting in the nearby mountain.

== Funding ==
HAWC construction and operation is funded jointly by the US National Science Foundation, the US Department of Energy Office of High-Energy Physics, and Consejo Nacional de Ciencia y Tecnología (CONACyT) in Mexico and the Laboratory Directed Research and Development (LDRD) program of Los Alamos National Laboratory.

Other significant sources of funding are:

- Red de Física de Altas Energías, México
- DGAPA-UNAM, México, grants IN105211, IN112910, IN121309, IN115409 and IA102715
- VIEP-BUAP, México, grant 161-EXC-2011
- University of Wisconsin Alumni Research Foundation, US
- The Institute of Geophysics, Planetary Physics, and Signatures (IGPPS) at Los Alamos National Laboratory (LANL), US
- The University of Maryland, US

== Results ==
In 2017, HAWC announced the first measurement of the cosmic-ray spectrum, and new results on the observed positron excess of antimatter.

In 2023 HAWC reported the first detection of gamma rays at TeV energies coming from the sun, produced by the interaction of cosmic rays with gas in the solar atmosphere.

In 2024, scientists report an observation of ultrahigh-energy (UHE) gamma rays from the Galactic center (GC) region, using 7 yr of data collected by the High-Altitude Water Cherenkov (HAWC) Observatory.

== See also ==
- Cherenkov radiation
- Milagro (experiment)
- VERITAS
