= Alberto Díaz Trujillo =

Mexican politician and lawyer

- Born: 7 November 1975 (age 50); Tlalnepantla, State of Mexico, Mexico
- Occupation: Politician
- Political party: PAN

Alberto Díaz Trujillo (born 7 November 1975) is a Mexican politician and lawyer affiliated with the National Action Party (PAN). In the 2012 general election he was elected to the Chamber of Deputies to represent the State of Mexico's 15th district during the 62nd session of Congress.
