= Magdalena González Furlong =

Mexican politician

Magdalena Adriana González Furlong
- Born: 4 March 1958 (age 68); State of Mexico, Mexico
- Occupation: Politician
- Political party: MC

Magdalena Adriana González Furlong (born 4 March 1958) is a Mexican politician who was affiliated with the National Action Party. In 2003–2006 she served as a deputy during the 59th session of Congress, representing the State of Mexico's 15th district. In the 2015 election period she participated as a candidate for municipal president of Tlalnepantla in the Citizen's Movement Party.

== History ==
=== Political career ===
- Deputy of the LIX Legislature of the Mexican Congress
- Outreach coordinator of the secretariat of political promotion of women in the CDE on PAN in the state of Mexico.
- Media director of CDM in Tlalnepantla, State of Mexico.
- Director of project management and execution of the coordination of social communication of the CDM in Tlalnepantla, State of Mexico.
- Program director for electoral coordination of PAN activists in the municipality of Tlalnepantla, State of Mexico.
- General Secretary and political training coordinator of the National Academy of Women.
- President and founder of the State Academy of Women in the state of Mexico.
- Regional coordinator in the state of Mexico in the group Friends of Fox.
- Participating in the parliament of women in Mexico.

=== Administrative career ===
- General Director of Statistics of the Ministry of Programming and Budget.
- Regional deputy director of SEDESOL in the state of Mexico.
- Information analyst in the Ministry of Programming and Budget.
- Information analysis supervisor of the fifth population and housing census in the Ministry of Programming and Budget.
- Communications director and press of the civic council of Tlalnepantla, State of Mexico.

=== Academic career ===
- Diploma in Strategic Management in Public Administration at the ITAM.
- Director of the School of Communication Sciences "La Salle" College in the State of Mexico.
- BA in Journalism from the School of Journalism Carlos Septien Garcia.
