= San Pablo Atlazalpan =

Coordinates: 19.21724°N 98.908957°W

San Pablo Atlazalpan, Chalco
- Town
- San Pablo Atlazalpan
- Nickname: Beside waterfalls
- Location of State of Mexico within Mexico Country.

- Location of Chalco Municipality within Mexico State.

- Location within Mexico
- Country: Mexico
- State: Mexico State
- Municipality: Chalco
- Founded: 16 century
- Incorporated: 1824

Area
  - Total: 1.67 km^{2} (0.64 sq mi)
- Elevation: 2,260 m (7,410 ft)

Population (2010)
  - Estimate (2010): 11,236
- Time zone: UTC-6 (CST)
  - Summer (DST): UTC-5 (CDT)
- ZIP codes: 56620
- Area code: +52 55

San Pablo Atlazalpan (/ˈætəlʒlpŋ/) is a town of 11,236 inhabitants located within the municipality of Chalco, State of Mexico, Mexico.

== History ==
The main church of San Pablo Atlazalpan, dedicated to St Peter and St Paul, dates from the 18th century. The interior was restored in 1982. The façade of the "Reform" pantheon was built in August 1906.

Also in the town is located the former hacienda of Axalco, whose date of construction is not known.

=== Religious discord ===
In 1979, a priest called Adolfo Zamora arrived in San Pablo Atlazalpan. He banned women from entering the St Pater & St Paul main church if they were wearing trousers, short skirts or with the head uncovered. Also, divorced women were not allowed to enter, and children of single women were refused baptism. The Mass began to be conducted in Latin, following traditional Lefebvrist and Tridentine rites.

The priest's measures provoked religious strife among the townspeople. Two groups formed: the traditionalists who attended the Latin mass, and the apostolic or "reform" Catholics whose ceremonies were conducted in Spanish and without the restrictions mentioned. The latter group set up an improvised church in a dwelling house on the corner of calles Independencia and Hidalgo, and brought in priests from other localities to officiate. Both churches claimed the name "St Peter & St Paul". The diocese of Nezahualcóyotl disavowed the Lefebvrist practice and in 1985 recognized the private house as a church. Public works ceased to function, as the adherents of the different groups refused all co-operation. Even families were divided among themselves. Into the new millennium other sects such as Evangelicalism, Pentecostalism and the Mormons took advantage of the conflict to attract followers, and the proportion of the town's population professing the Catholic faith fell from 90% to 10% within 10 years.

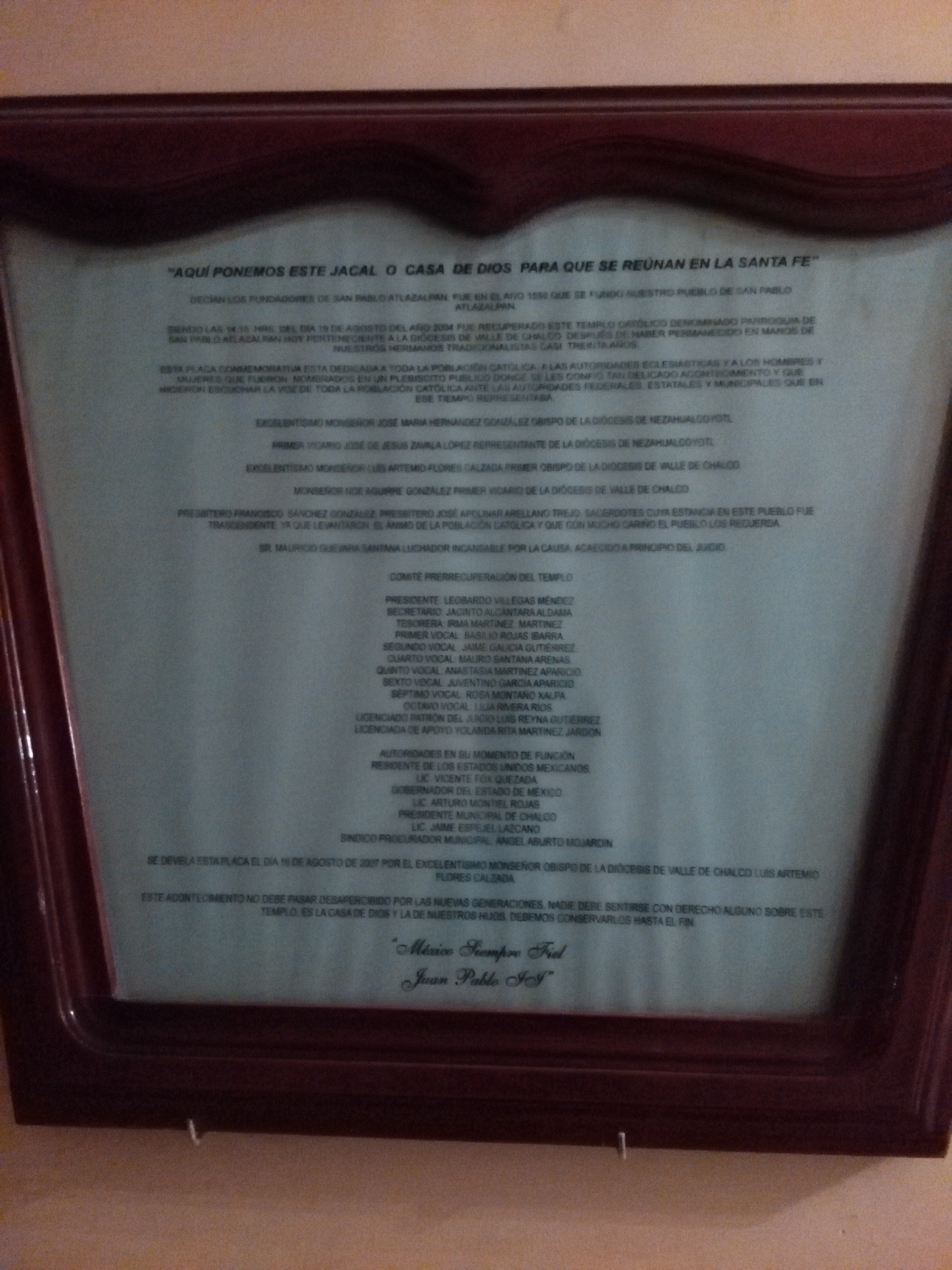
Plaque commemorating the reuniting of the townspeople after the religious conflict

The conflict came to an end in August 2004, when by a court order the State police entered the main church and it was returned to the Apostolics. The traditionalist group remained in being, but decided to build their own church, which opened in 2011. Since then the two sides have coexisted peacefully in the town.

== Festivities and celebrations ==
The town has a number of public festivities each year. The main one is celebrated on June 29, honoring Saint Peter and Saint Paul, saints of the Catholic Church.

The "Tamale Fair" is held in December, lasting one week. The makers of the typical Mexican dish tamale come together in order to compete on whose is the best-prepared, as well as to sell their wares to local diners who gather there.

== Demography ==
As of 2010 there are 11,236 inhabitants, comprising 5,451 males and 5,785 females. The ratio of women to men is 1.041. The fertility rate of the female population is 2.28 children per woman. The percentage of illiteracy among adults is 3.5% (2.21% in men and 4.75% in women) and the mean school grade is 8.02 (8.40 in men and 7.66 in women).

== Gallery ==
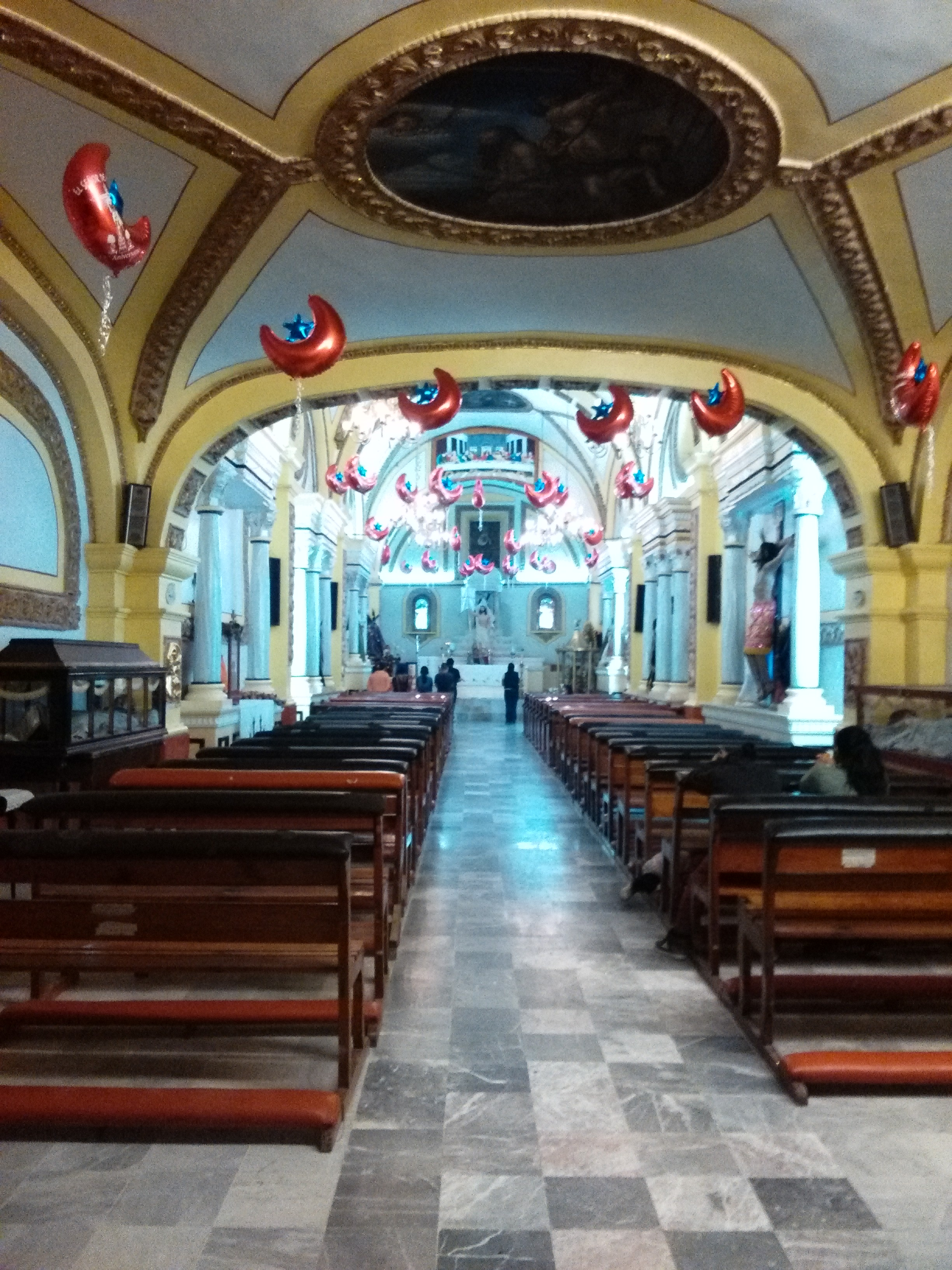
Interior of St Peter and St Paul Church

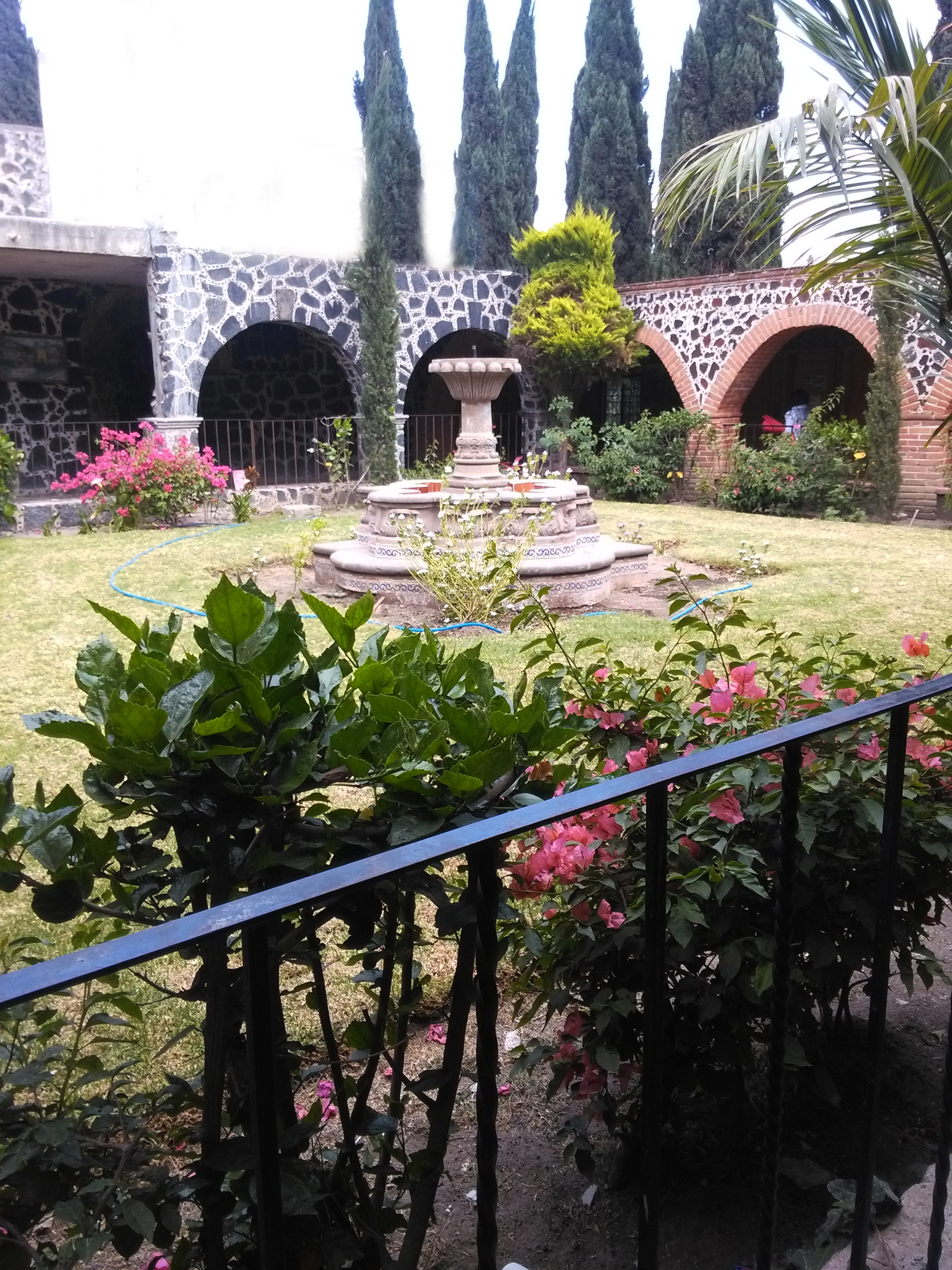
Cloister beside the church of San Pablo Atlazalpan, Mexico

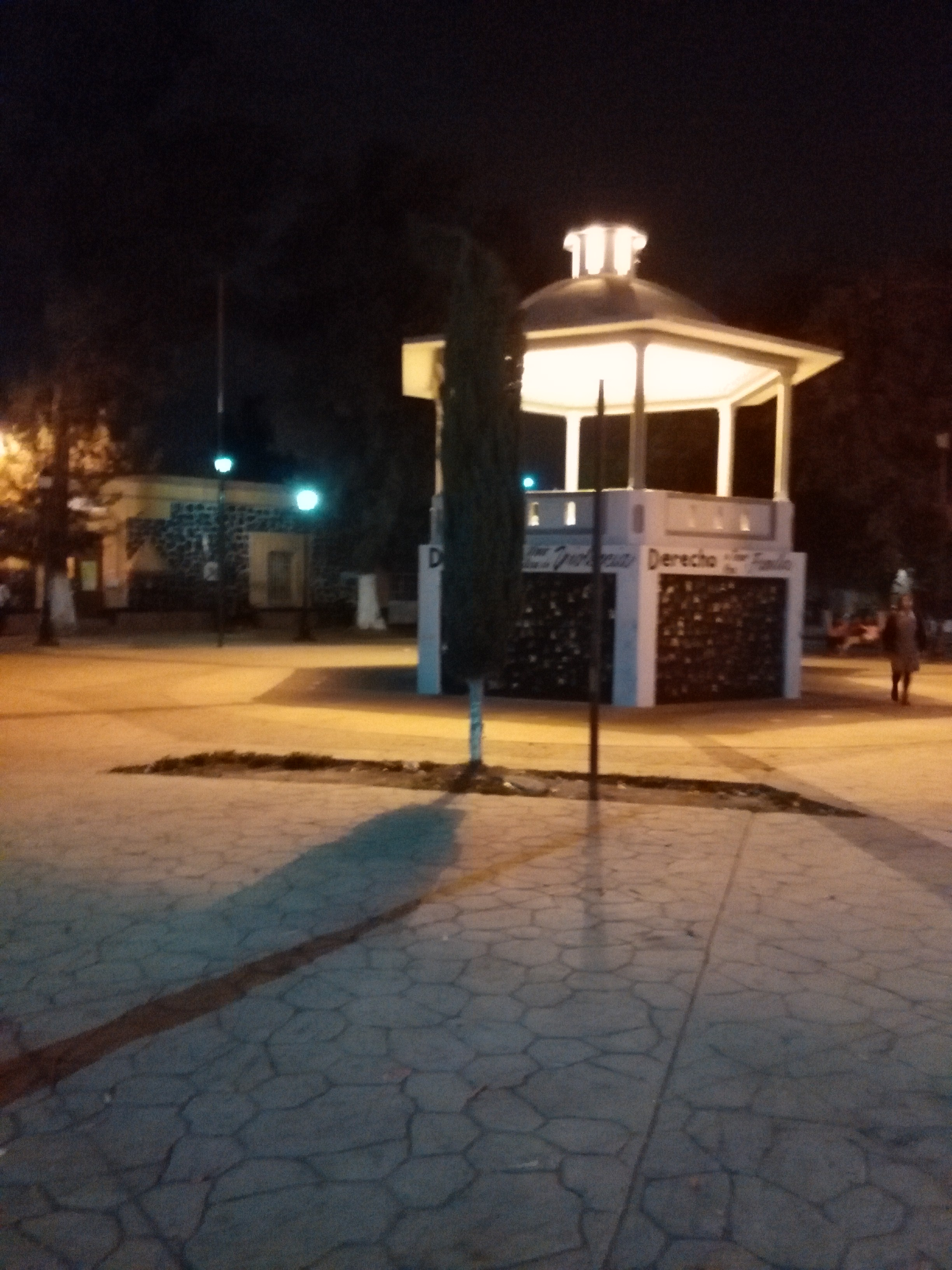
Side view of the central plaza of Saint Pablo Atlazalpan town, where the Tamal Fair is held

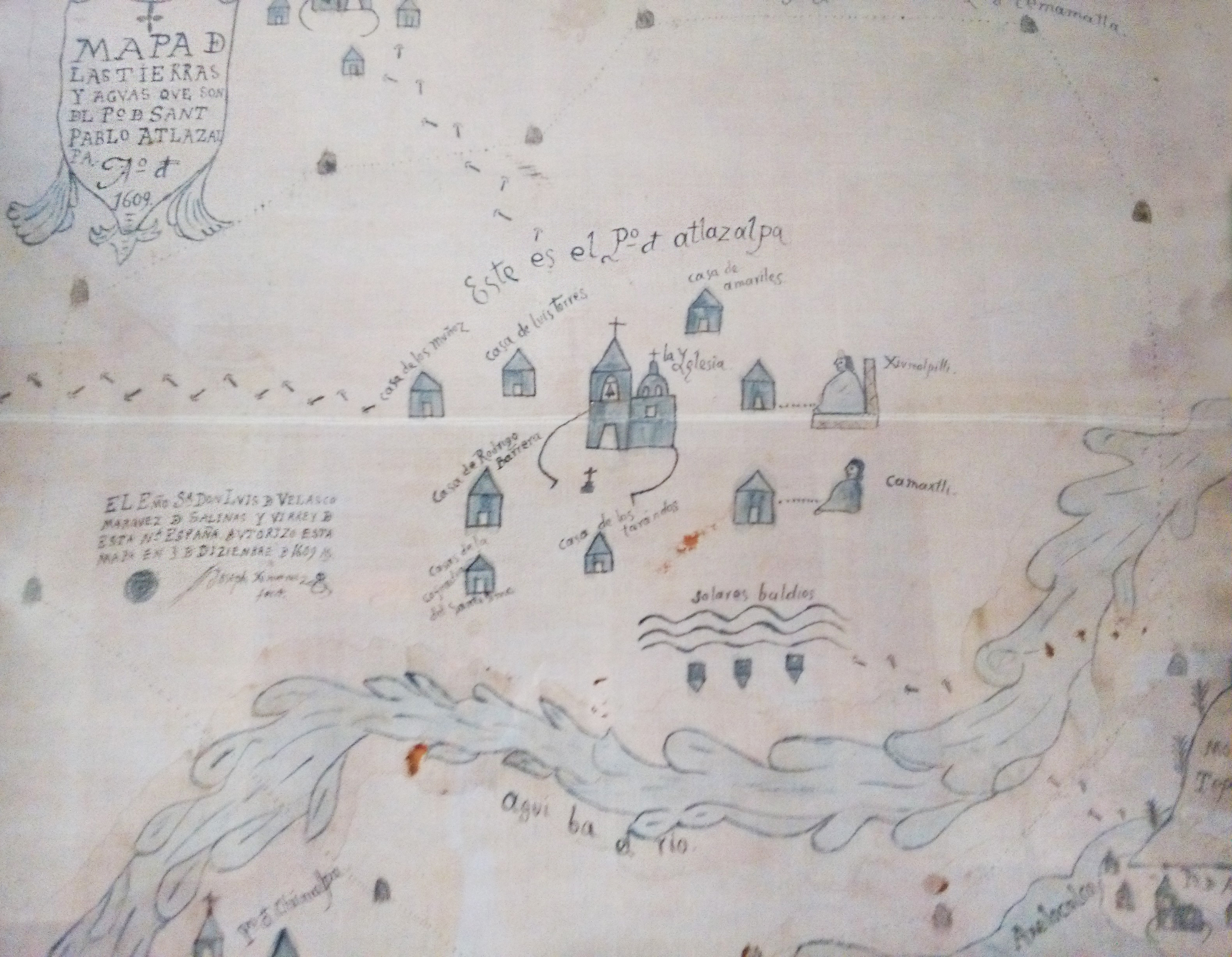
Saint Pablo Atlazalpan map, authorized by the Viceroy Luis de Velasco in 1609

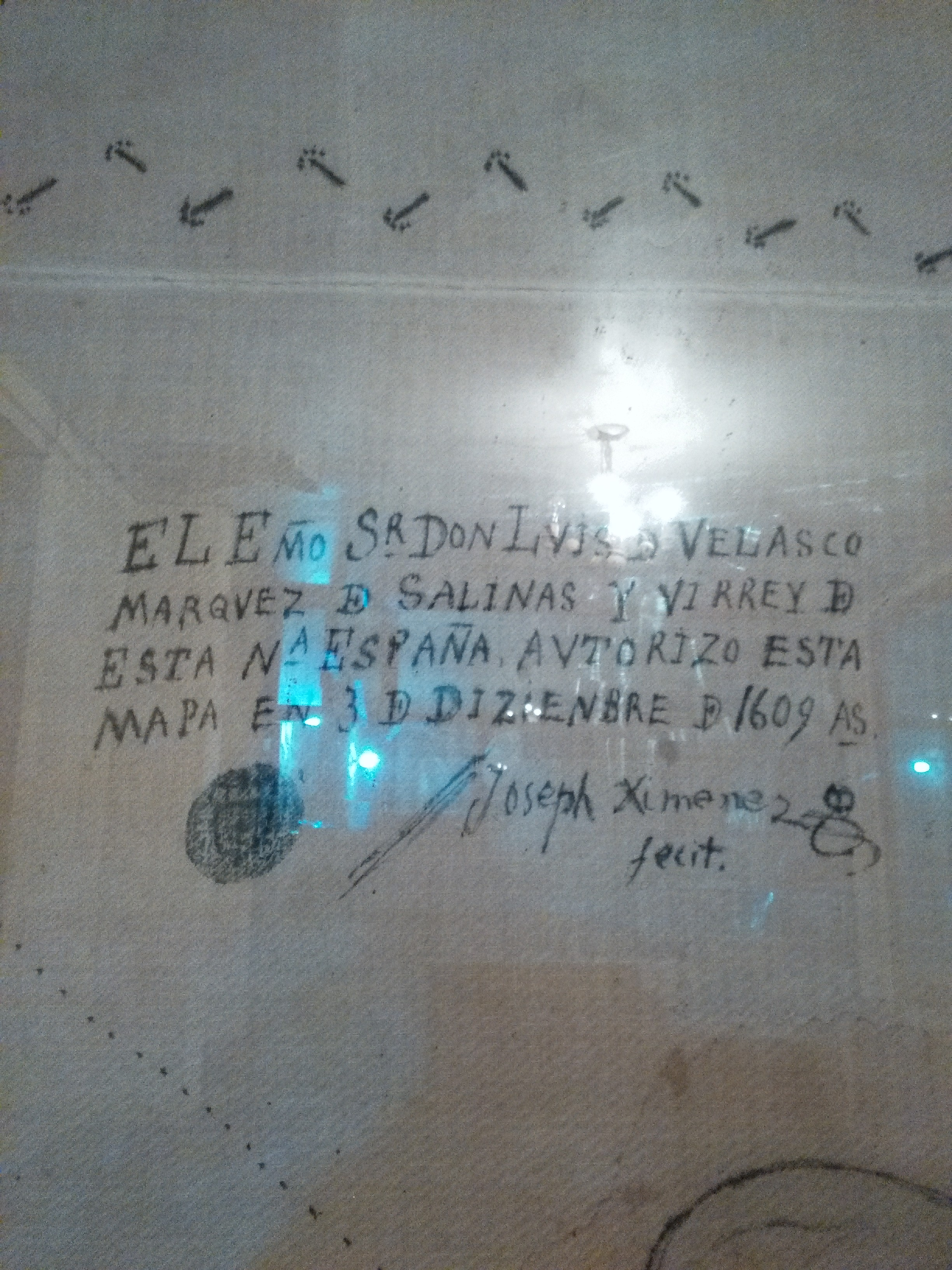
Seal of the Viceroy Luis de Velasco on the town map
