= Milagro (experiment) =

Coordinates: 35.87835°N 106.67625°W

Milagro (the Spanish word for miracle) was a ground-based water Cherenkov radiation telescope situated in the Jemez Mountains near Los Alamos, New Mexico at the Fenton Hill Observatory site. It was primarily designed to detect gamma rays but also detected large numbers of cosmic rays. It operated in the TeV region of the spectrum at an altitude of 2530 m. Like conventional telescopes, Milagro was sensitive to light but the similarities ended there. Whereas "normal" astronomical telescopes view the universe in visible light, Milagro saw the universe at very high energies. The light that Milagro saw was about 1 trillion times more energetic than visible light. While these particles of light, known as photons, are the same as the photons that make up visible light, they behave quite differently due to their high energies.

A cosmic ray or high-energy gamma ray striking an atom in the upper atmosphere generates a cascade of particles known as an air shower. This cascade of particles are traveling near the speed of light and generate Cherenkov radiation as they pass through the atmosphere and the water in the Milagro experiment. The photons of Cherenkov radiation are detected by an array of detectors or photomultiplier tubes which send a signal to a recorder. The data from the recorder can then be used to determine the energy and direction of the cosmic or gamma ray. The Milagro experiment used 700 sensitive light detectors submerged in the pond plus another 200 detectors arrayed around the pond.

The Milagro Experiment stopped taking data in April 2008 after seven years of operation. There is a follow-up experiment called the High Altitude Water Cherenkov Experiment (HAWC) located near the Large Millimeter Telescope at the Sierra Negra volcano, Mexico, which is expected to be 15 times more sensitive. In November 2008 Milagro published the surprising result of observing cosmic ray anisotropy.

The Milagro gamma-ray observatory laid the groundwork for the High-Altitude Water Cherenkov Observatory (HAWC) which has led to major discoveries. From the conservatory, researchers get an up-close look into the Milky Way galaxy where they have detected the PeV gamma rays. These rays are among the highest-energy light ever observed (LANL, 2022).

== See also ==
- Atmospheric Cherenkov telescope
- Fenton Hill Observatory
