= Chalco de Díaz Covarrubias =

Town and municipality in the State of Mexico

- City & Municipality
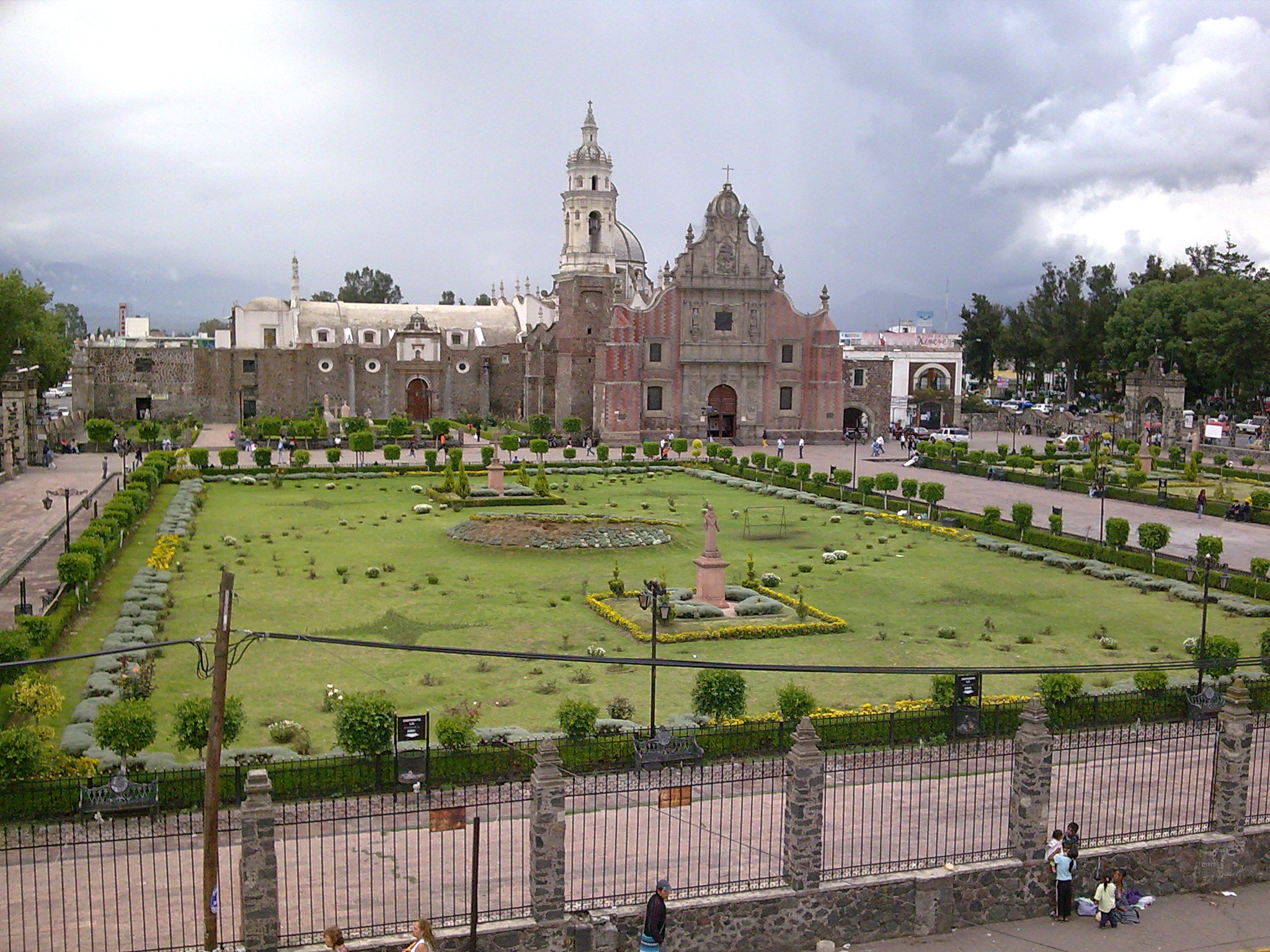
- Church

- Coat of arms
- Motto: Government that listens and resolves
- Chalco location in State of Mexico

- Communities in Chalco municipality
- Coordinates: 19°15′53″N 98°53′51″W
- Country: Mexico
- State: State of Mexico
- Region: Amecameca
- Metro area: Zona Metropolitana del Valle de México
- Municipal Status: January 30, 1824
- Municipal Seat: Chalco de Díaz Covarrubias

Government
  - Type: Ayuntamiento
  - Municipal President: Francisco Osorio

Area
  - Land: 219.22 km^{2} (84.64 sq mi)
  - Water: 0.00 km^{2} (0 sq mi)
- Elevation (of seat): 2,240 m (7,350 ft)

Population (2010)
  - Municipality: 310,130
- Time zone: UTC-6 (CST)
- Postal code (of seat): 56600
- Area code: 55
- Demonym: Chalquense
- Website: Official website (in Spanish)

Chalco de Díaz Covarrubias (Nahuatl pronunciation: [ˈt͡ʃaːɬko]) is a city that is municipal seat of the surrounding municipality of Chalco. It lies in the eastern part of the State of Mexico just east of the Federal District of Mexico and is considered part of the Mexico City metropolitan area.

Chalco name is of Nahuatl origin, and comes from the word Chalchihuitl "green stone, jade", and Co: "place." Together, these words mean "the place of jade".

The municipal head, bears the surname of Diaz Covarrubias, in honor of Juan Díaz Covarrubias, one of the practitioners of medicine who was heroically shot in Tacubaya in 1859.

== History ==
The first group of Native Americans to reach the region of Chalco was "the acxotecas" coming from Tula, the famous and ancient homeland of the Toltecs, and the first town they settled was called Chalco. Later, a second group of people arrived, this were the Mihuaques. By 1160 A.D arrived teotenancas and chichimecas from the valley of Toluca, through Tláhuac. Around the lake there were other groups, including cuixocas, temimilolcas and ihuipanecas, which formed a congregation of tribes with Chalcas.

By 1354 the entire region was known by the name of Tzacualtitlán-Tenanco Amaquemeca-Chalco". For 1410 the territory of the Chalca almost a Confederate state, consisted in four domains: Acxotlan-Chalco, Tlalmanalco-Amaquemecan, Tenanco-Tepopollan and Xochimilco-Chimalhuacan, being Acxotlan-Chalco Header".

War as a means of expansion and conquest becomes common, just we mention one of many: in 1376 the "flower war" that lasts eight years and is among Mexicans and Chalco, in this war only Chalca people died in battle and is because of this long struggle for survival and defense of the territory that the Chalco region didn't achieve the splendor of Texcoco or Tenochtitlan.

There are two versions of the arrival of Hernán Cortés in the region of Chalco.

The first one is about a Chalca who says to be aware of the presence of Cortes in Tlaxcala and Cholula, await the passage of volcanoes and bring gifts of gold, the other says Chalco were to receive Cortes Texmelucan and bought her jewelry, valuable stones, bracelets, blankets, feather-rich foods among other things. Cortes in his 2nd letter tells relationship that started from an Amecameca town that is the province of Chalco and along the way receives ambassadors of Moctezuma asking you to return or wait Moctezuma order to receive it. Cortés remains two days in Amecameca where you given away good food, gold and slaves.

Meanwhile, Clavijero in his book Ancient History of Mexico says that "Cortes Amecameca Ayotzingo became, instead serving as places of hot earth. Cacamac receive the Spaniards in Ayotzingo, gives them supplies and offers city Texcoco to go away. Ixtlixóchitl with Spanish helped Chalca to defend the people of Xochimilco and Tlahuac, once stayed as allies of the Spaniards, Cortes Chalca seeking protection against the constant threat of the Mexica formed so a coalition of different tribes against the Aztecs, with the defeat of the Aztecs, the Chalca again dominate their territory being committed and available to Spanish and forcing inhabitants to participate in expeditions Chalca.

The colony starts from the moment the distribution of land among the conquerors go. "Chalco, in 1533, becomes real Province for hearing decision" was of great importance as a production area of corn, wheat, barley, straw, wood, charcoal, fruits, vegetables, construction materials such as wood, volcanic rock and stone for his Piers Aytozingo and Chalco that were favored by the heavy traffic and near the city of Mexico. Besides the Commendation arises, Cortes himself assigned the Province of Chalco in 1520 Nuño de Guzmán takes over the province and its taxes. Tributes were also assigned to the Dominican order to build a monastery and corn taxes were appointed to the Marquis.

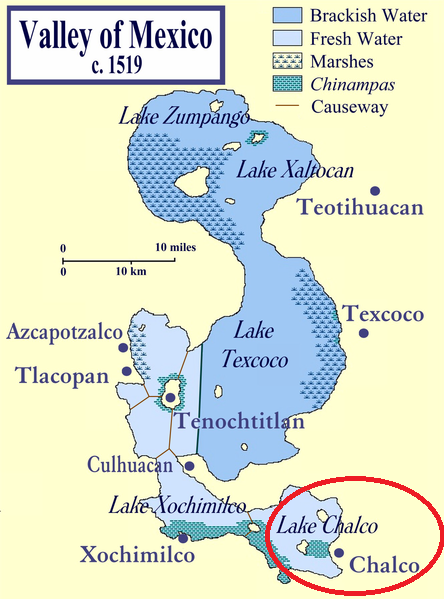
The red circle shows where Chalco was located, when the Lake of Texcoco still existed

With the decline of the Knights comes in 1530 the village and in 1563 the village arises in Chalco whose boundaries are constantly moving between Tlayacapan and Tlalmanalco. The judges continued in Chalco and elsewhere throughout the colonial period, large property of Chalco had its origins in the royal grants awarded between 1560 and 1642, the first land grant was awarded in 1565 to Juan Bautista Avendano, Anton Mendez in 1614 and 1641 Hernando de Aguilar, Alfonso Núñez Casillas and Diego Ruiz Lozano, asked permission to bring and pursue breeding cows to produce milk, cheese, butter, and so on. Simultaneously primogeniture and chiefdoms emerge; in terms of primogeniture in the province of Chalco, the most important was that of Don Miguel Saenz de Sicilia and Soria, by widespread ballot in Madrid on May 4, 1774.

Lake Chalco was a major influence as Chalco in the sixteenth century was a lake port in four docks where docked trajineras carrying vegetables and seeds to Mexico City.

During the nineteenth century, the most salient facts are: the consummation of Independence, the Constitution of 1824 was promulgated forming the Free and Sovereign State of Mexico with the districts of Acapulco, Cuernavaca, Huejutla, Mexico, Apaxco, Toluca, Tula and Tulancingo; both parties Chalco, Coyoacan, Cuautitlan, Ecatepec, Mexicaltzingo, Mexico, Tacuba, Teotihuacan Texcoco, Xochimilco and Zumpango.

In 1861, the municipal head is appointed villa and imposed the names of "Diaz Covarrubias" in honor of Juan Diaz Covarrubias. medical student killed by Leonardo Mark on April 11, 1859. Chalco also hosted the meeting of Maximilian and Empress Carlota Amalia, who comes to receive when returning from Yucatán.

"It stands out in the State of Mexico's indigenous peasant rebellion made by Julio Lopez Chavez that although it was very short (December 1867-1868), had a great importance to regional and national level, is why some authors such as Gaston Garcia Cantu, Manuel Diaz Ramirez, John Hart and others have argued that this movement was precursor of the Zapatista movement (almost 40 years earlier). Julio Lopez Chavez began his agrarian movement in favor of the division of estates among indigenous exploited, because for him the Indians were the landowners, this movement started in San Francisco Acuautla, Coatepec and San Vicente Chicoloapan, it is also executed on July 9, 1868 within the school of Lightning and Socialism ".

During the Porfiriato a major economic activity takes place, as the meeting point for traders from different places, the water communication continues with its canoes and steamboats, industry reaches further development and goods reach their peak and its beginnings were in the late sixteenth and early seventeenth century. Among the farms that stand out are those of Xico, the Company, the Moral, among others; also in 1895 the Regional School of Agriculture which was not successful installed and in the same year is desiccated Lake Chalco, disappearing the few fishermen who had later these lands were used as farmland.

In 1890 the president of Mexico, General Porfirio Díaz laid the foundation stone for the first City Hall and in 1893 was opened by the same agent.

As the revolutionary movement of 1910, the municipality of Chalco had some clashes between Zapata and Carranza, which take Ayotzingo church, set on fire twice, they shoot several men, women outraged; Chalco destroy the Zapatistas in the parish archives, part of the church and some houses.

1979 on the grounds of Lake Chalco dried starts the largest slums in Latin America known as Valle de Chalco with more than 500,000 inhabitants in the first stage. That's why the municipal head is elevated to city status in March 1989, after November 30, 1994 the inhabitants of the region of Valle de Chalco fighting for their separation in search of an identity and better living conditions, for which the municipality 122 called Valle de Chalco Solidaridad was created.

A major employer is the San Rafael paper factory. Government sources mention that the helicopter where Francisco Blake Mora traveled collided in this municipality, leaving 8 top government officials dead.

== The municipality of Chalco ==
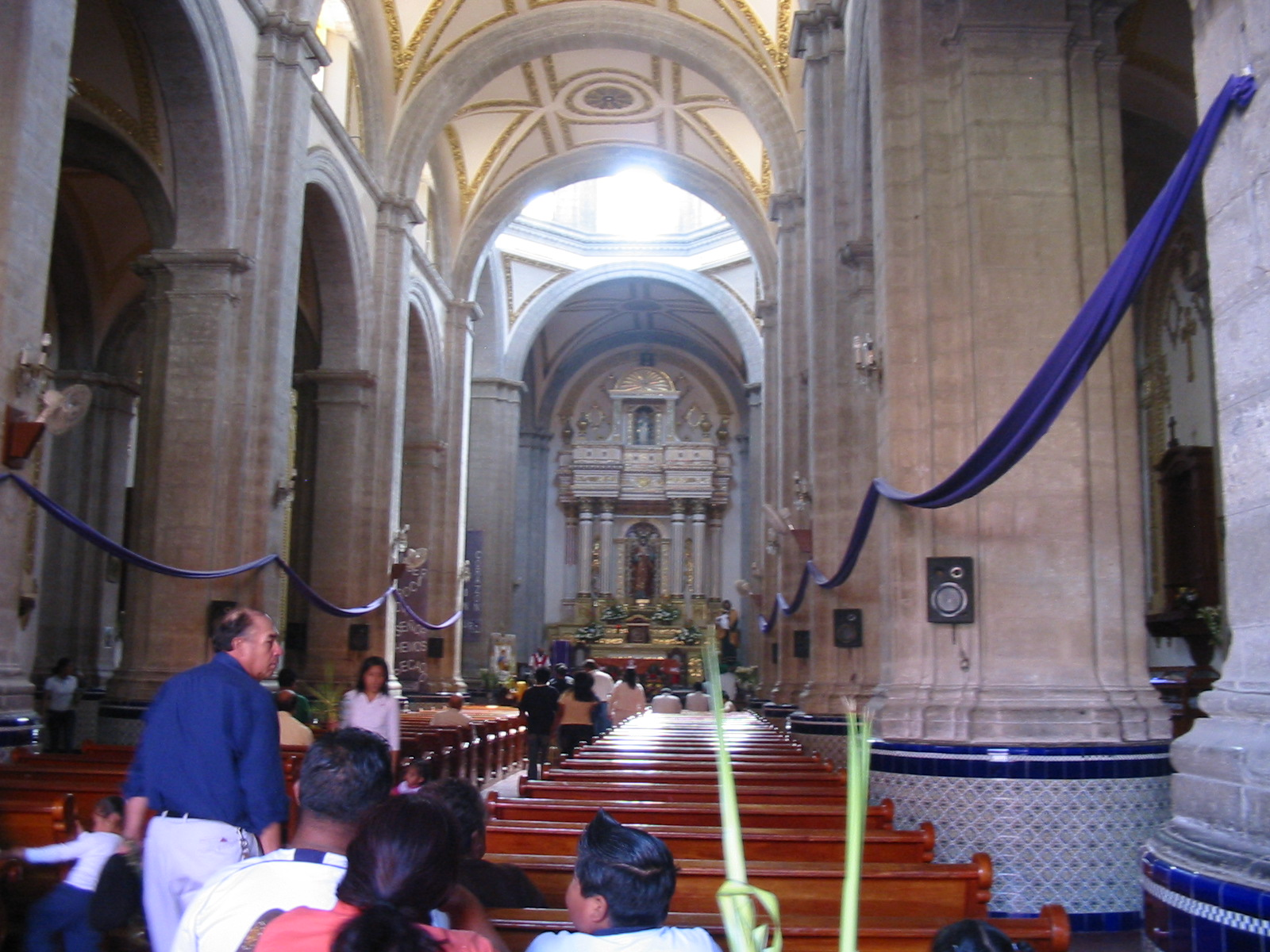
View from inside of the main church in Chalco.

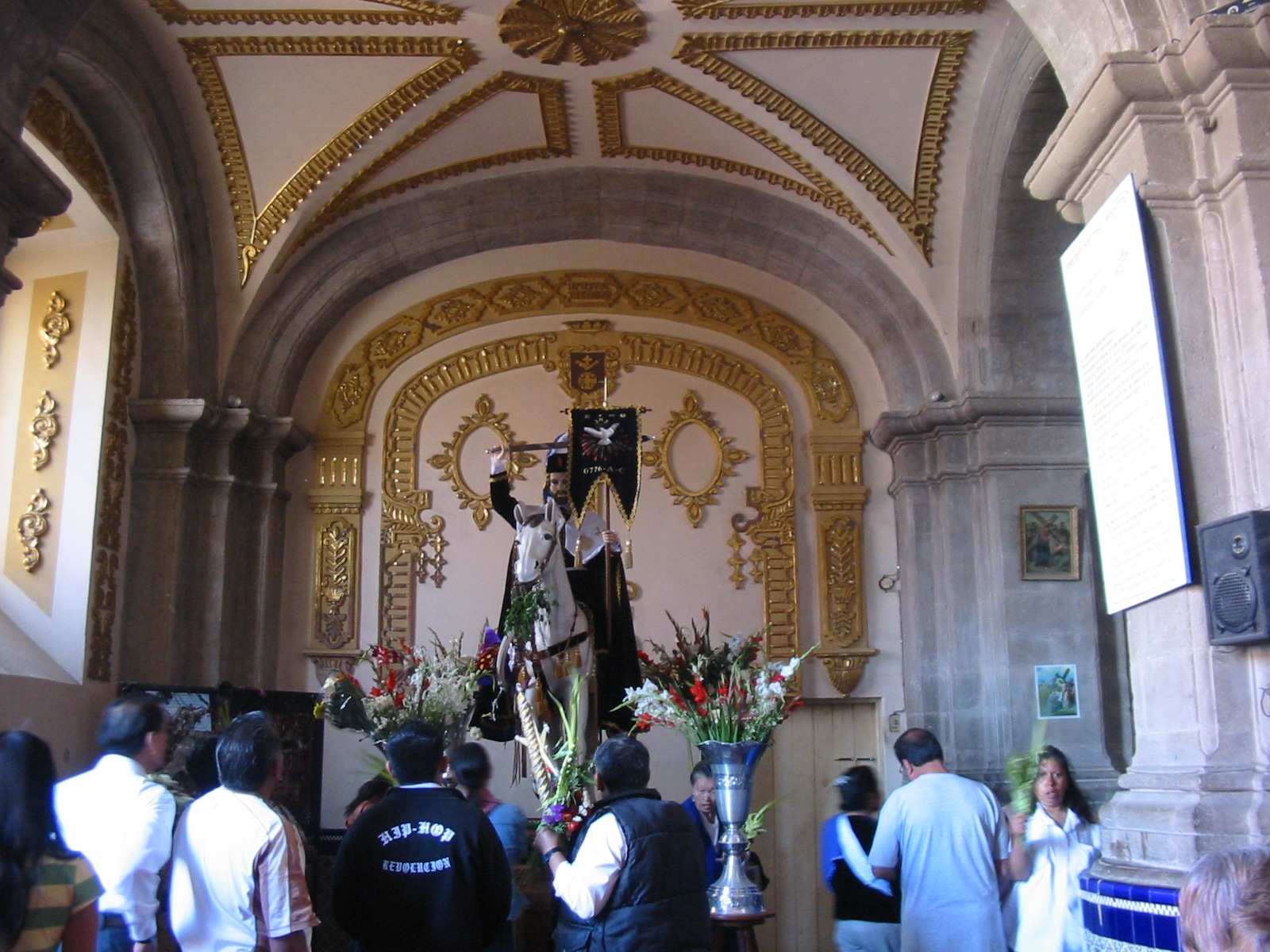
Santiago Apostol Statue, patron saint of the town, it is displayed inside the main church.

The municipality, which has an area of 234.72 km^{2} (90.626 sq mi), had a population of 310,130 inhabitants at the 2010 census.

Chalco is often confused with the Valle de Chalco Solidaridad municipality as the name Chalco is a part of both. The major difference is that Valle de Chalco Solidaridad is located near the ancient Lake Chalco. In fact, Chalco is interconnected to Valle de Chalco through Avenida Solidaridad.

=== Towns and villages ===
Chalco is one of only three municipalities in Mexico that have at least nine localities of over 10,000 inhabitants. (It and Tijuana Municipality, Baja California both have nine, while Tlajomulco de Zúñiga Municipality, Jalisco has eleven.) The largest localities (cities, towns, and villages) are:

Name	2010 Census Population
Chalco de Díaz Covarrubias	168,720
San Martín Cuautlalpan	23,501
San Mateo Huitzilzingo	15,389
San Gregorio Cuautzingo	13,138
Santa María Huexoculco	12,456
San Marcos Huixtoco	12,229
San Juan Tezompa	11,819
San Pablo Atlazalpan	11,236
Santa Catarina Ayotzingo	10,702
Total Municipality	310,130

=== History of the area ===
The first civilization which arrived to what today is Chalco were the Acxotecas. According to Chimalpahin, they came from Tula and named themselves "chalcas" The second group arriving were the Mihuaques, who hadn't leaders and adopted those ones of the Acxotecas. Circa 1160, the Chichimecas Teotenancas arrived from the Toluca valley and came across Tlahuac. They all together formed the Chalca civilization. They lived there until 1520, when the Spanish conquistadors arrived.

=== Transportation ===
Chalco is served by the State of Mexico collective transports divided in geographical areas (AG-##) locating Chalco within the AG-10. Volkswagen vans ("combis" or "colectivos") transport people from the municipality to the boundaries of the Federal District in order to let people take the subway from that point into the inner Mexico City. Several colectivos also run from Chalco to Mexico City's Mexico City International Airport.

== Notable people ==
- Antonio Pujol (1913–1995), painter

== See also ==
- Universidad Azteca
