= Mexico City International Airport =

International airport serving Mexico City

Mexico City International Airport Aeropuerto Internacional Benito Juárez

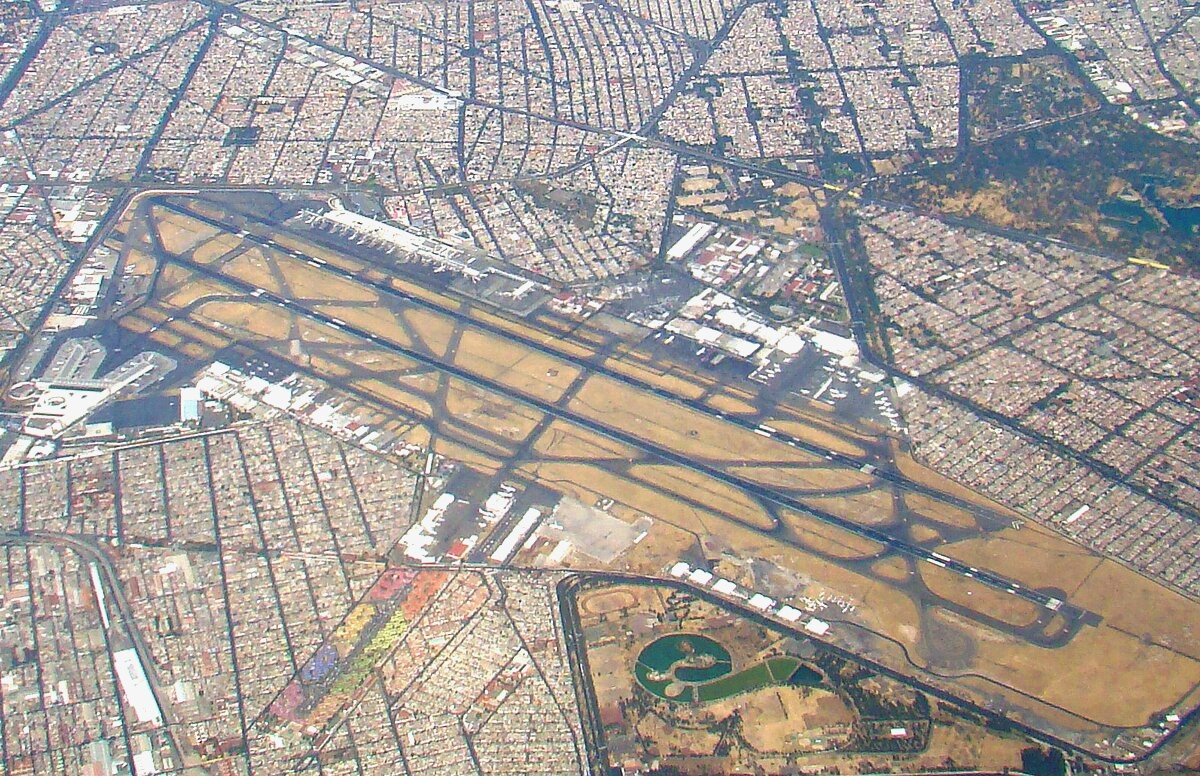
- IATA: MEX; ICAO: MMMX; LID: ME1

Summary
- Airport type: Public
- Owner/Operator: Grupo Aeroportuario de la Ciudad de México
- Serves: Greater Mexico City
- Location: Venustiano Carranza, Mexico City, Mexico
- Opened: May 15, 1931; 95 years ago
- Hub for: Aeroméxico; Aeroméxico Connect; Volaris; Viva
- Time zone: CST (UTC−06:00)
- Elevation AMSL: 2,230 m (7,320 ft)
- Coordinates: 19°26′10″N 099°04′19″W
- Website: www.aicm.com.mx

Map
- Location within Mexico City MEX (Mexico City) MEX (Mexico)

Runways
Direction	Length		Surface
Direction	m	ft	Surface
05R/23L	4,094	13,432	Asphalt
05L/23R	3,920	12,861	Asphalt

Statistics (2025)
- Total passengers: 44,605,800
- Ranking in Mexico: 1st
- Cargo tonnage: 252,555.6
- Employees: 1,265
- Source: DAFIF; Statistics: Airport website

Mexico City International Airport (Spanish: Aeropuerto Internacional de la Ciudad de México, AICM) (IATA: MEX, ICAO: MMMX), officially Benito Juárez International Airport, is the main international airport serving Mexico City, the capital of Mexico. It is the busiest airport in Mexico, and as of 2025 ranks as the third-busiest in Latin America, the 15th-busiest in North America, and the 50th-busiest in the world by passenger traffic. The airport is served by more than 25 airlines with routes to over 100 destinations across Mexico, the Americas, Europe, the Middle East, and Asia.

As the primary hub for Mexico's flag carrier, Aeroméxico, the airport serves as a SkyTeam hub. It is also a hub for Volaris and Viva and a focus city for Magnicharters. The airport has two passenger terminals and two runways. It hosts agencies including the Mexican Airspace Navigation Services (SENEAM), the Mexican Federal Civil Aviation Agency (AFAC), as well as an Air Force base. The airport is owned by the Mexican Navy and operated by Grupo Aeroportuario de la Ciudad de México. It is named after 19th-century president Benito Juárez.

As part of Mexico City's airport system—along with Toluca International Airport and Felipe Ángeles International Airport—the airport operates at full capacity. It is one of the busiest two-runway airports in the world, with 850 aircraft movements per day. With an average daily passenger count of 122,000, the airport handled 44,605,576 passengers in 2025, marking a 1.7% decrease from the previous year.

== History ==
=== Origins ===
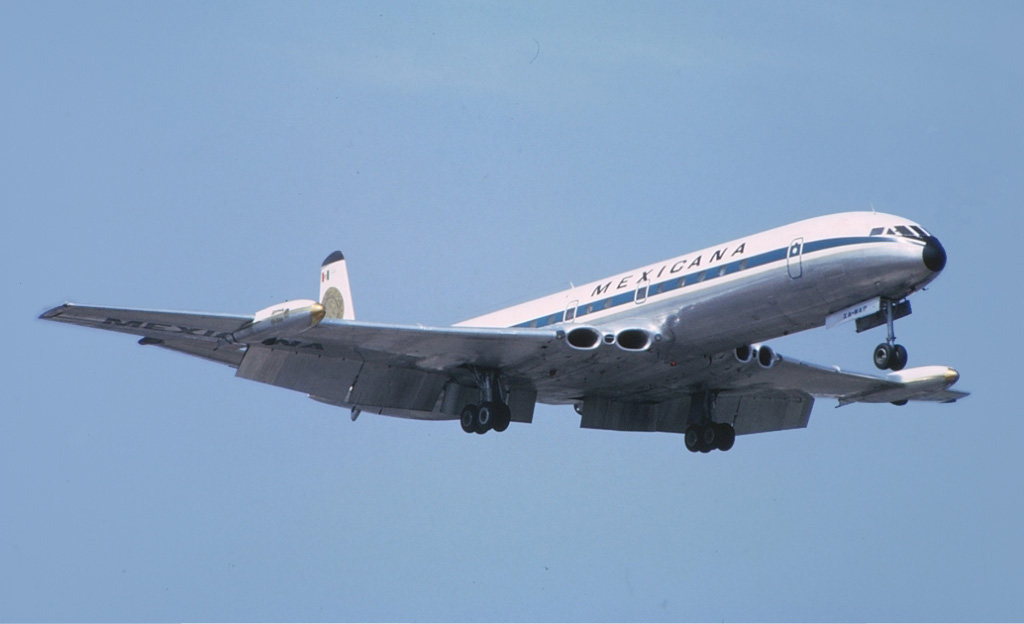
Mexicana de Havilland DH-106 Comet 4 at Mexico City Airport

The site known as Llanos de Balbuena has been used for aviation since 1910. That year, Alberto Braniff made the first powered flight over Mexican soil, flying a French Voisin aircraft with a 50-horsepower engine. On November 30, 1911, President Francisco I. Madero became the world's first head of state to fly in an airplane, piloted by Geo M. Dyott of Moisant International.

In 1915, the site opened as Balbuena Military Airport, equipped with five runways. A small civilian airport opened in 1928, with regular commercial service starting in 1929 and was officially inaugurated on May 15, 1931. On July 8, 1943, it was granted international status and launched its first international route to Los Angeles, operated by Mexicana de Aviación.

From 1949 to 1951, the airport expanded with a new runway (05R-23L), an apron, a control tower, and administration offices. President Miguel Alemán inaugurated a renovated passenger terminal on November 19, 1952. By 1956, the airport operated with four runways: 05L-23R (2,720 metres (8,920 ft)), 05R-23L (3,000 metres (9,800 ft)), featuring electric lights for night-time service; 13-31 (2,300 metres (7,500 ft)), built to replace Runway 14-32, which was too close to adjacent residential areas; and Runway 5 Auxiliary (759 metres (2,490 ft)).

On December 2, 1963, the airport's name was changed from "Aeropuerto Central" (Central Airport) to "Aeropuerto Internacional de la Ciudad de México" (Mexico City International Airport). In the 1970s, the two shortest runways (13/31 and 5 Auxiliary) were closed to facilitate the construction of a social housing complex in that area, named Unidad Fiviport. This left the airport with its current two-runway layout. The Mexico City Area Control Center (ACC) began operating on November 24, 1978, and remains in service.

=== Expansion and decentralization ===
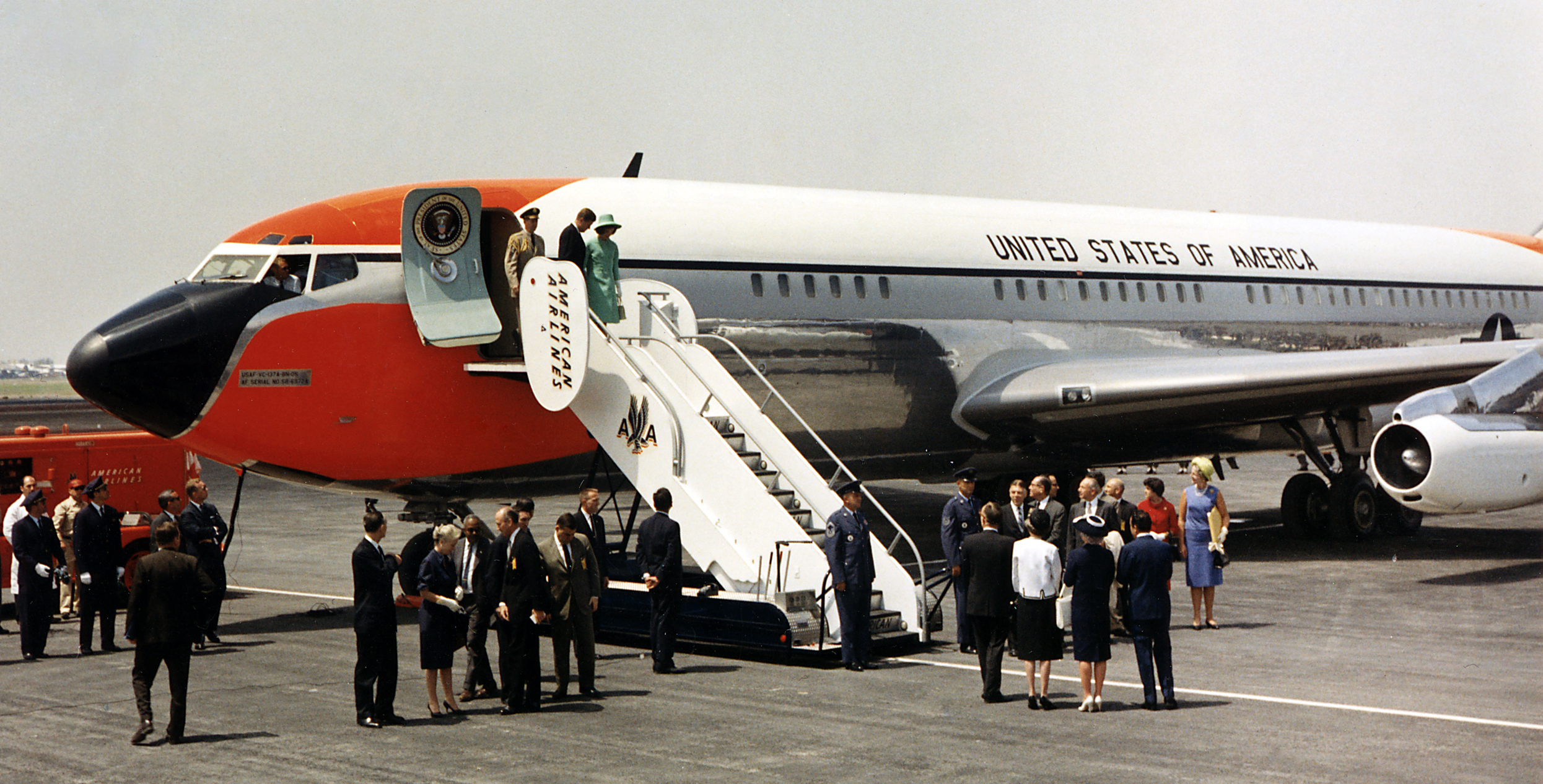
President and Mrs. Kennedy disembark Air Force One at the airport, June 29, 1962.

The airport's location in a densely populated area restricts infrastructure expansion. The proximity of the two parallel runways prevents fully independent simultaneous operations, limiting the airport's capacity.

The terminal was expanded in 1980, doubling its capacity. In 1990, the terminal was reconfigured to separate domestic and international operations. On April 11, 1994, a new international section opened through a joint venture between Aeropuertos y Servicios Auxiliares (ASA) and Hakim Grupo Industrial.

In the 1990s, Mexicana began decentralizing operations to reduce congestion, shifting many flights to Guadalajara, Monterrey, and Mérida. In 1994, all general aviation operations were moved to Toluca International Airport, which became the new hub for private and non-commercial flights. Since then, general aviation has been prohibited, with only military, government, commercial, and authorized flights permitted. In 2001, a satellite concourse with eight gates was added east of the main terminal.

=== Congestion challenges ===
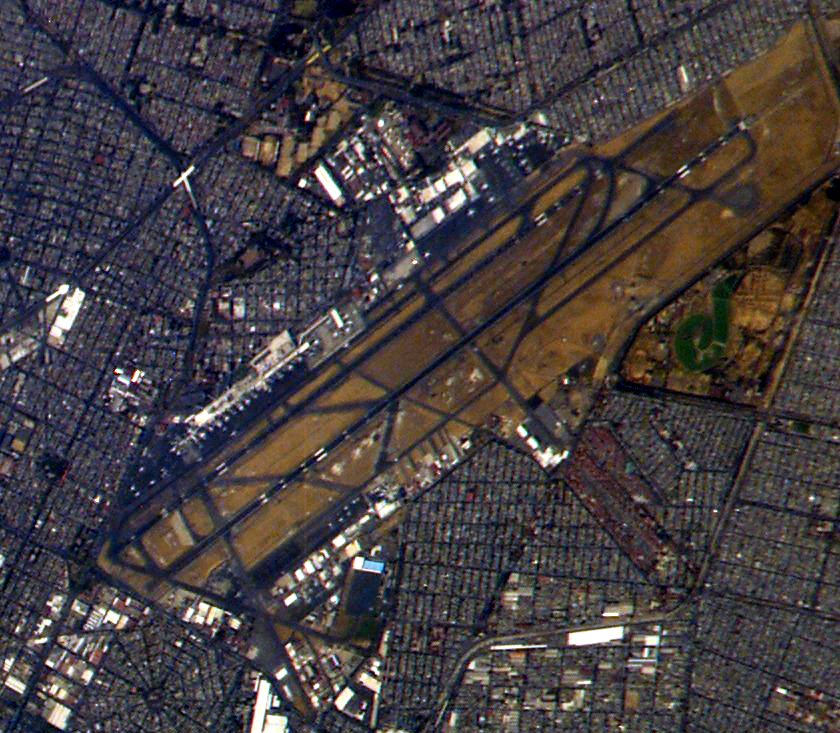
Satellite view of the airport

The congestion challenges at Mexico City Airport became a prominent issue in Mexican politics in the early 2000s. Large infrastructure projects, particularly in transportation, have historically played a crucial role in presidential legacies due to centralized decision-making, their symbolic significance for progress, and leaders' aspirations to leave a lasting impact.

In 2002, President Vicente Fox's administration proposed a new airport on a 5,000 hectares (12,000 acres) site in Atenco and Texcoco. However, the Atenco project faced significant local opposition, particularly from the Community Front in Defense of Land (Spanish: Frente del Pueblo en Defensa de La Tierra, FPDT), representing locals facing displacement. Violent clashes forced the cancellation of the project later that year.

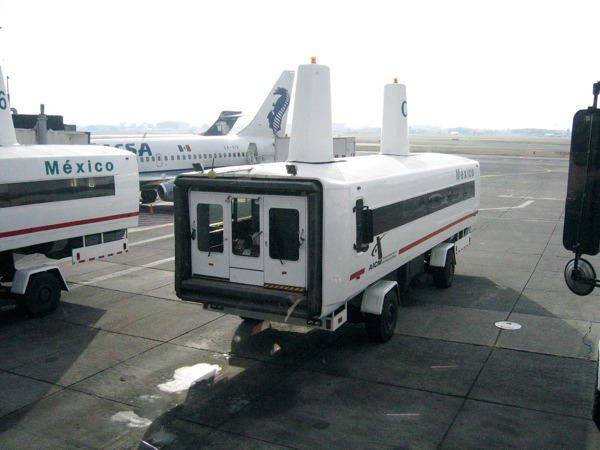
Mobile lounge at Mexico City Airport

Following the cancellation of the Atenco project, the federal government announced an extension to the existing terminal in 2003, increasing its annual capacity from 20 to 32 million passengers. The project added 48,000 square metres (520,000 sq ft) of new construction and renovated 42,000 square metres (450,000 sq ft), including new check-in areas, commercial zones, a departures concourse, and a long-distance bus terminal with direct access to nearby neighborhoods.

Throughout the 2000s and 2010s, political initiatives aimed at establishing nearby airports such as Puebla, Toluca, Cuernavaca, and Querétaro as supplementary options for serving the Mexico City Area were introduced. This initiative, known as the Metropolitan Airport System, aimed to reduce pressure on Mexico City International Airport.

Until 2007, a single terminal served all flights at Mexico City's airport. The airport was among a few globally to employ mobile lounges as a boarding system, a technology also used by airports such as Washington-Dulles, Montreal, New York-JFK, Paris-Charles de Gaulle, and Jeddah. This system involved elevated bus-like vehicles to transport passengers from gates to remote aircraft parking positions. Terminal 2 was inaugurated on November 15, 2007, and fully opened in March 2008. It increased the number of gates by 40% and overall capacity by 15%. Most SkyTeam members—except Air France and KLM—moved operations to the new terminal.

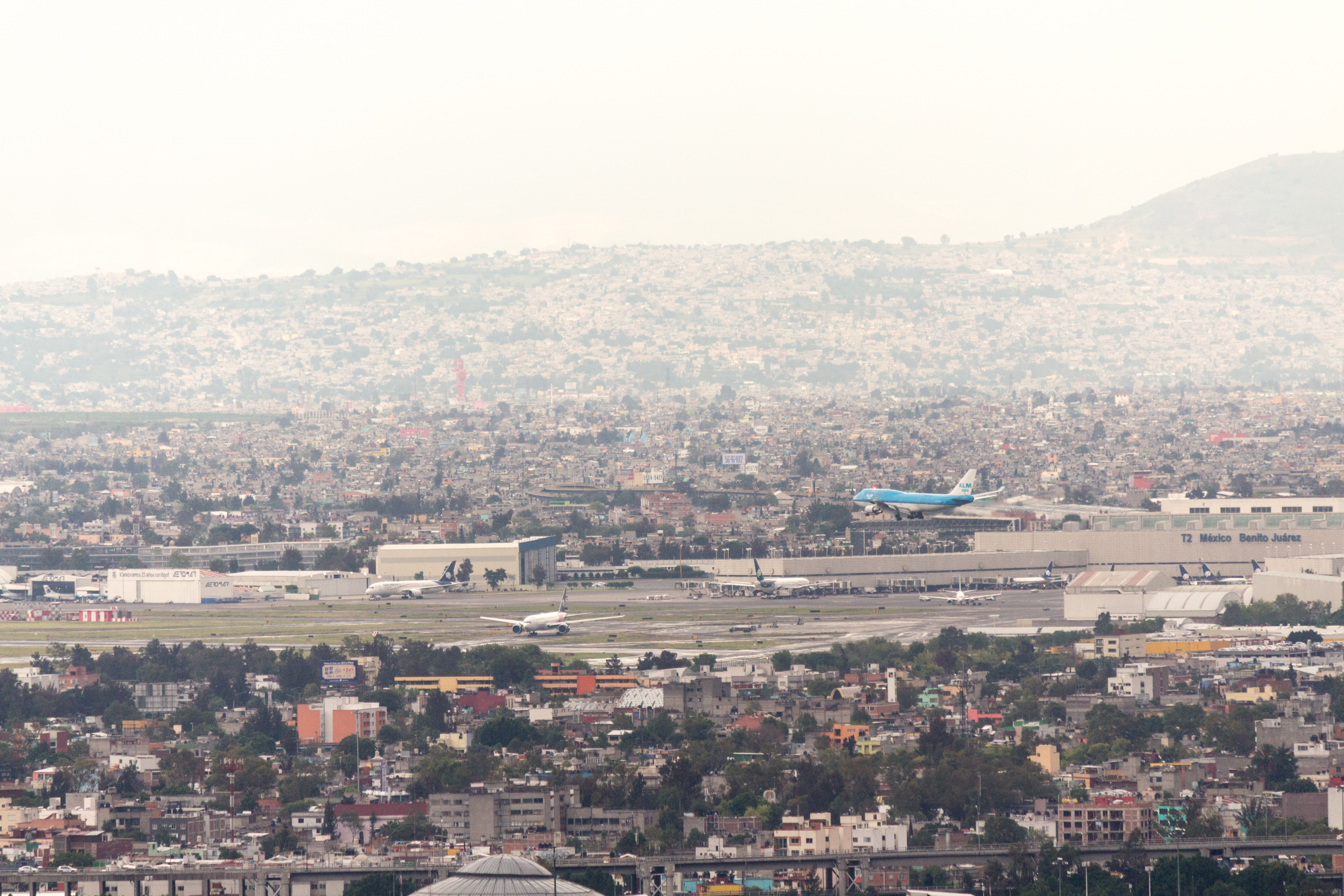
Image showing the physical constraints of the airport

=== Replacement controversy ===
In 2014, aviation authorities declared Mexico City's airspace saturated, capping operations at 61 per hour between 07:00 and 23:59. That year, President Peña Nieto's administration launched the Texcoco Airport project. Positioned as Mexico's largest public infrastructure project in a century, it aimed to replace the aging Mexico City International Airport by 2023, featuring a state-of-the-art terminal of 560,000 square metres (6,000,000 sq ft) and six runways. However, López Obrador, then a presidential candidate, campaigned against the project, sparking political controversy.

Upon assuming the presidency, López Obrador's administration held a controversial public referendum on whether to cancel Texcoco. Despite criticism over its legality and transparency, the project was cancelled, and construction began on Felipe Ángeles International Airport at Santa Lucía, which opened in 2022. Intended as a secondary airport for Mexico City, it has struggled to attract airlines and passengers.

On July 23, 2020, Terminal 2's Pier L extension opened, adding seven gates to reduce remote stand operations and bus transfers to aircraft. However, in 2022, a new saturation declaration reaffirmed the 61-operations-per-hour cap, effective 05:00–23:59 at Terminal 1 and 06:00–23:00 at Terminal 2, maintaining the 61 operations/hour limit. In 2023, the Mexican government attempted to decongest the airport by relocating all cargo flights to Felipe Ángeles Airport, citing safety and congestion concerns. In 2025, an MXN 8 billion (approx. USD 460 million) renovation began, scheduled for completion by mid-2026, aiming to improve operations and prepare for Mexico's role in the 2026 FIFA World Cup.

== Facilities ==
Current airport layout

The airport is located in the neighborhood of Peñón de los Baños within Venustiano Carranza, one of Mexico City's sixteen boroughs, 5 kilometres (3.1 mi) east of Downtown. It is surrounded by built-up areas: Gustavo A. Madero to the north, and Venustiano Carranza to the west, south, and east.

The airport spans 747 hectares (1,850 acres) and has two parallel runways separated by less than 300 metres (980 ft), which restricts simultaneous operations. At 2,230 metres (7,320 ft) elevation, the airport is classified as hot and high, where reduced air density reduces aircraft performance. Runway 05L/23R is 3,900 metres (12,800 ft) long, and runway 05R/23L is 3,950 metres (12,960 ft) long. The runways, aligned southwest–northeast, contribute to aircraft noise pollution in central neighborhoods, especially during landings with northeast winds.

Terminal 1, cargo facilities, maintenance hangars, and administration buildings are located on the north side of the airfield. On its northern edge, Aeropuertos y Servicios Auxiliares (ASA), a government-owned corporation, is headquartered. On the south side of the airfield are Terminal 2, maintenance hangars, police facilities, Mexican Airspace Navigation Services buildings, and a military complex. The airport includes 95 aircraft stands for commercial operations, 63 of which are connected to the terminals via jet bridges (33 in Terminal 1 and 30 in Terminal 2), and 32 are remote.

Air Force Base No. 19 (Spanish: Base Aérea Militar No. 19 Ciudad de México) (B.A.M. 19) is located on airport grounds, adjacent to Terminal 2. It serves as the home for the High Command Special Air Transport Unit (UETAAM), which operates a fleet that includes the Boeing 737, IAI 201, JetStar, King Air, SA 330J, and UH-60 Black Hawk. It also hosts the Coordination Office of the Presidential Air Transport Unit. B.A.M. 19 includes an apron and several hangars, one of which is known as the Presidential Hangar, used for state visits and presidential transport. It also includes administrative buildings and facilities to accommodate Air Force personnel.

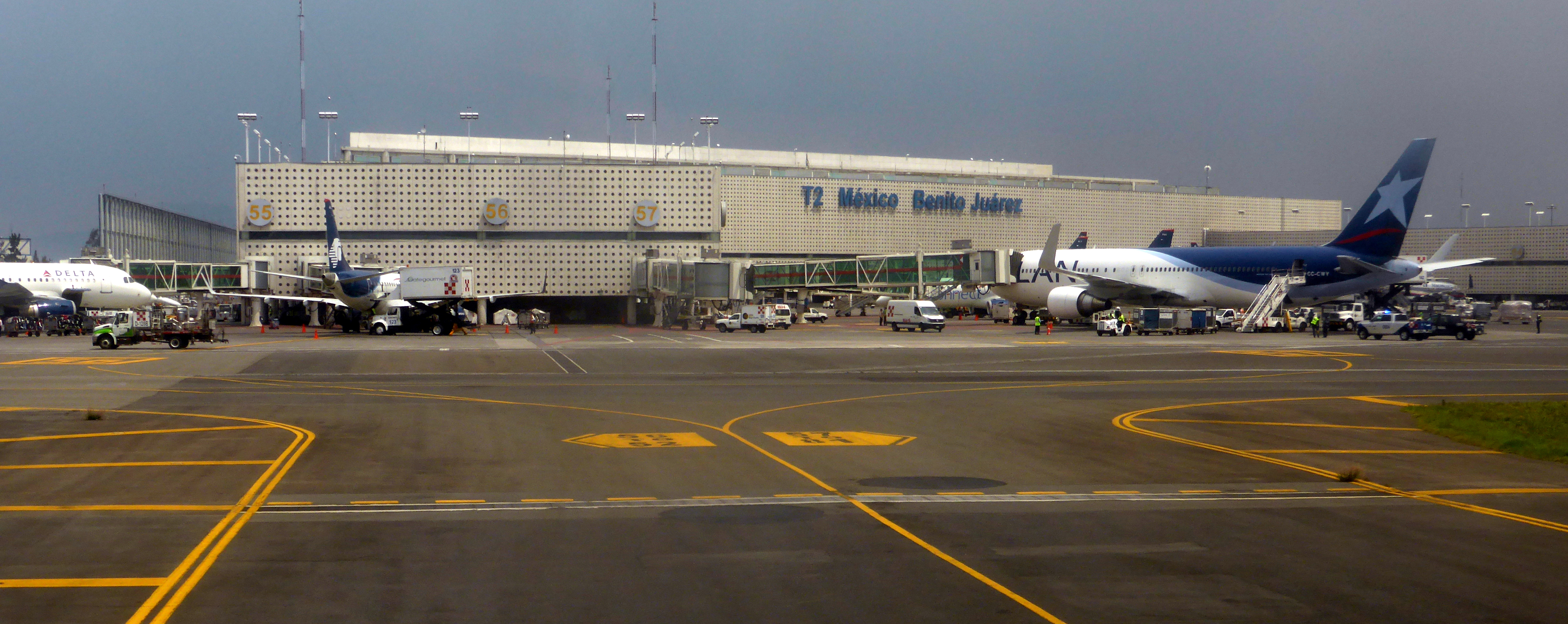
Terminal 2 airside

Mexico City Area Control Center (ACC) is one of four Area Control Centers in Mexico, along with Mazatlán ACC, Monterrey ACC, and Mérida ACC. It operates under the Mexican Airspace Navigation Services (Spanish: Servicios a la Navegación en el Espacio Aéreo Mexicano). Mexico ACC provides air traffic control services to aircraft within the Mexico Flight Information Region (FIR), covering central Mexico. It borders Monterrey ACC to the north, Mérida ACC to the east, Mazatlán ACC to the west, and Mazatlán Oceanic (MMFO) to the south.

== Terminals ==
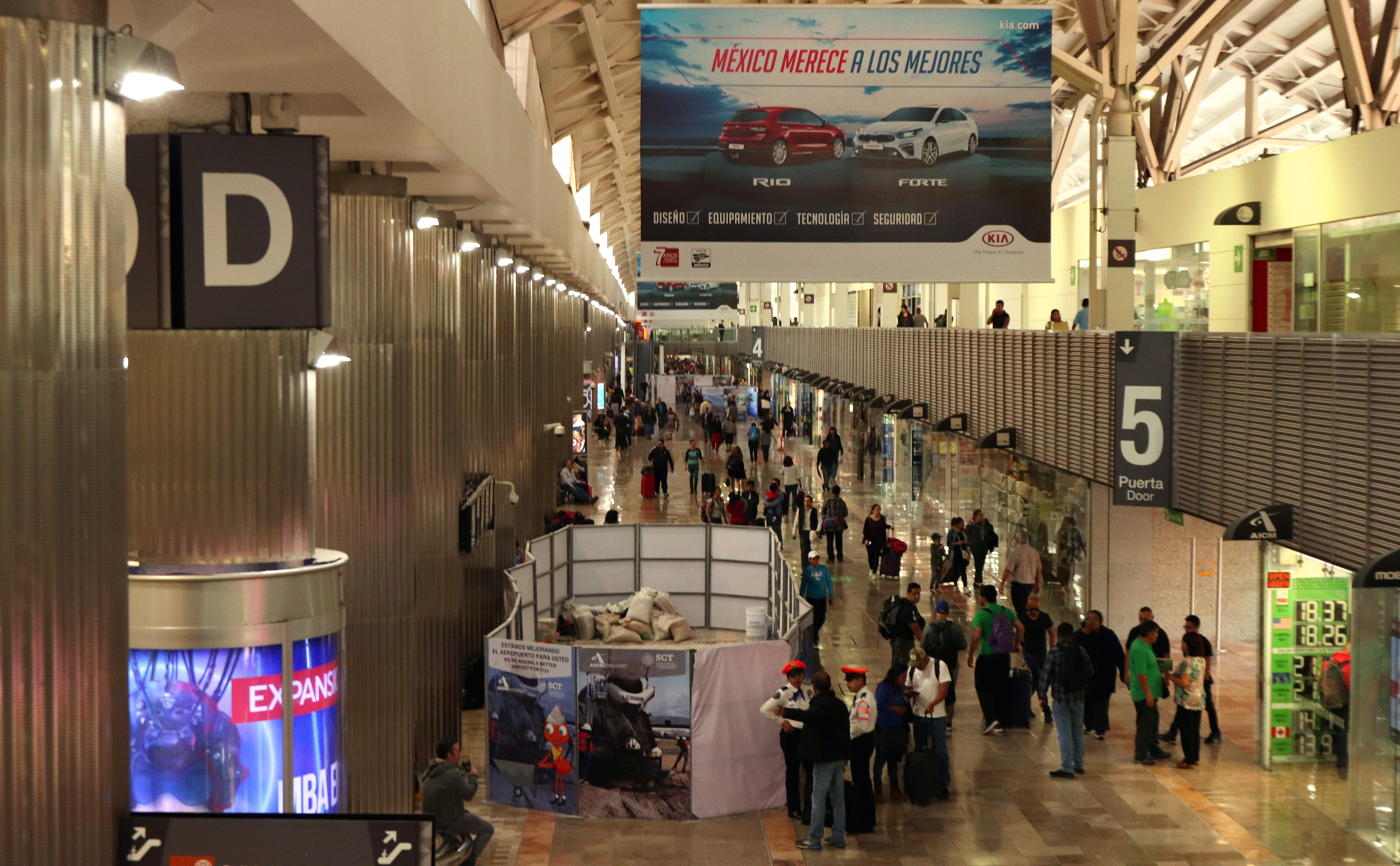
Terminal 1 landside main hall

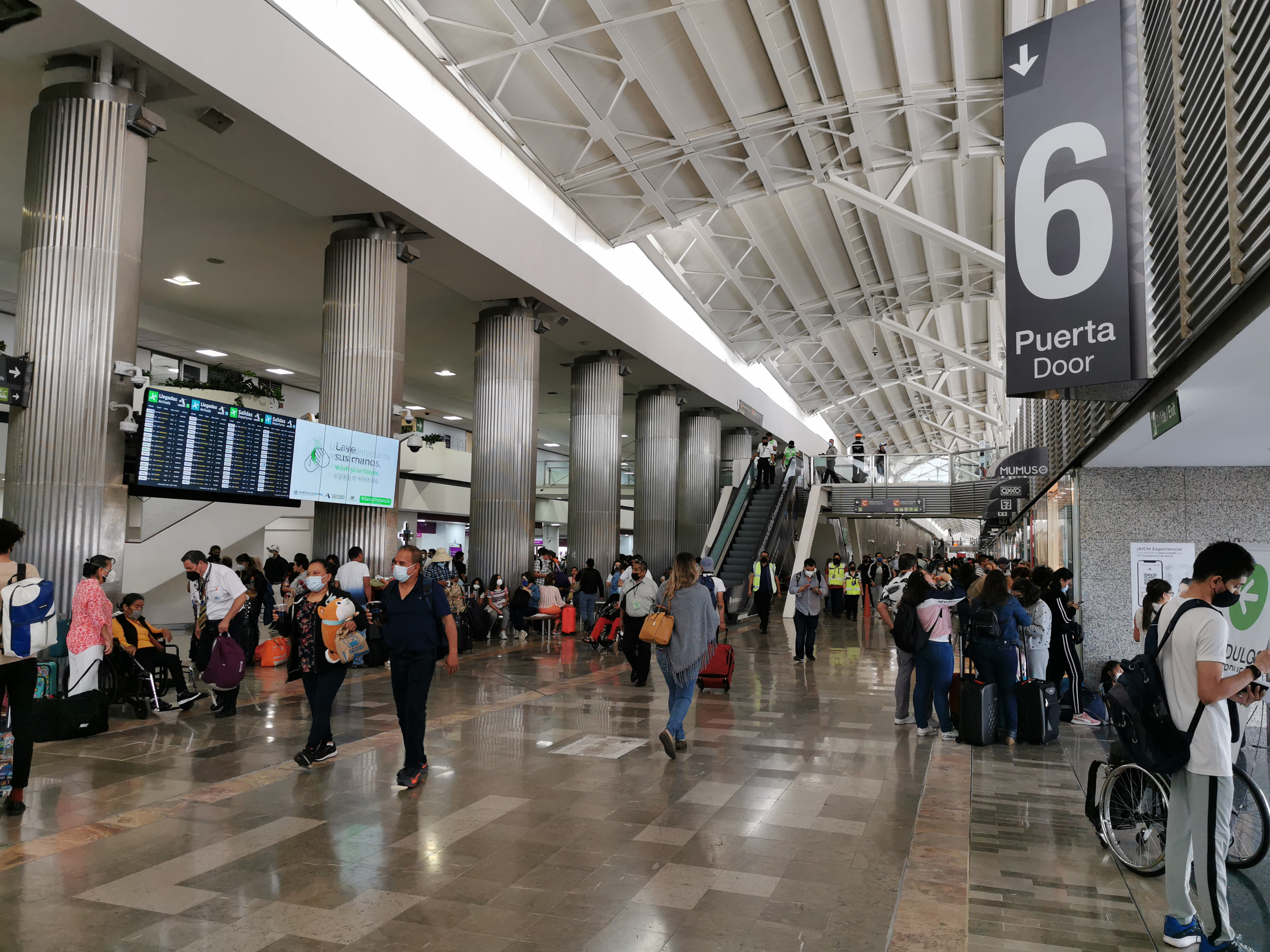
Terminal 1 main hall by entrance 6

=== Terminal 1 ===
Terminal 1, operational since 1952, has undergone several expansions, with major upgrades in 1970, 1989, 1998, 2001, and 2006, resulting in a total surface area of 542,000 square metres (5,830,000 sq ft). The terminal is an 800 metres (2,600 ft) long, two-story building, with international services located in the eastern section and domestic services in the west. The ground floor houses all arrival facilities, including 22 baggage claim carousels; domestic check-in areas for Volaris, Viva, and Magnicharters (A1, A2, B, C, D, D1), and a commercial corridor hosting snack kiosks, banks, souvenir shops and car rental services. The top floor contains international check-in areas (F1, F2, F3), food courts, restaurants, security checkpoints, and a 900 metres (3,000 ft) long departures concourse (gates 1-28) connected via a walkway to a satellite building (gates 29–36).

Terminal 1 offers 33 contact gates with jet bridges and 20 remote stands. Gates 1-18 primarily serve domestic flights, while gates 19-36 cater to international routes. Passengers using remote gates are transported by bus. The terminal also houses administrative offices, two long-distance bus terminals, and parking for 5,500 vehicles.

Terminal 1 features various VIP lounges, including the Admirals Club by American Airlines, Elite Lounge by MasterCard, Salón Centurión by American Express, Salón Beyond by Banamex, Sala Avianca, The Grand Lounge Elite (Air France-KLM-ANA-Visa), Iberia VIP Lounge (Iberia-British Airways), Televisa VIP Lounge, Terraza Elite, The Lounge by Global Network, United Club by United Airlines, and VIPort Lounge.

Hotel services within Terminal 1 include the Camino Real with 600 rooms, the Hilton with 110 rooms, and the Courtyard Mexico City Airport with 288 rooms. Nearby hotels accessible from the terminal include izZzleep Hotel, Fiesta Inn Aeropuerto México, Holiday Inn México Dalí Aeropuerto, City Express Aeropuerto Ciudad de México, Hotel Grand Prix, Hotel Riazor, and We Hotel Aeropuerto.

Terminal 1 is served by domestic carriers such as Volaris, Viva, and Magnicharters; North American airlines including Air Canada, United Airlines, and American Airlines; European carriers such as Lufthansa, Turkish Airlines, Air France, KLM, Iberia, and British Airways; Asian airlines including All Nippon Airways, China Southern Airlines, Emirates, and Hainan Airlines; and Latin American carriers including Avianca, Avianca Costa Rica, Avianca El Salvador, LATAM Brasil, LATAM Chile, LATAM Perú, Volaris Costa Rica, and Volaris El Salvador.

=== Terminal 2 ===
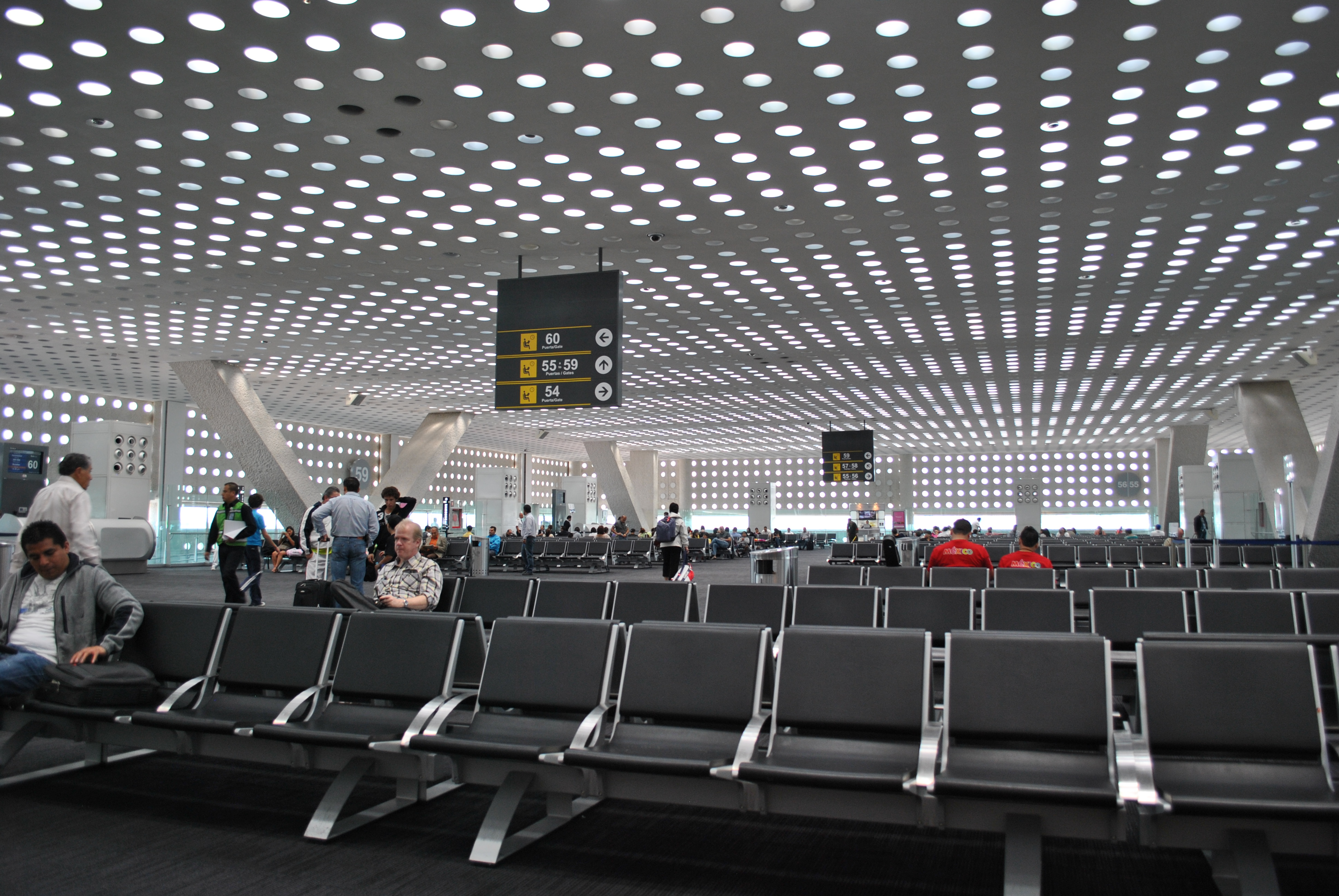
Terminal 2 departures concourse

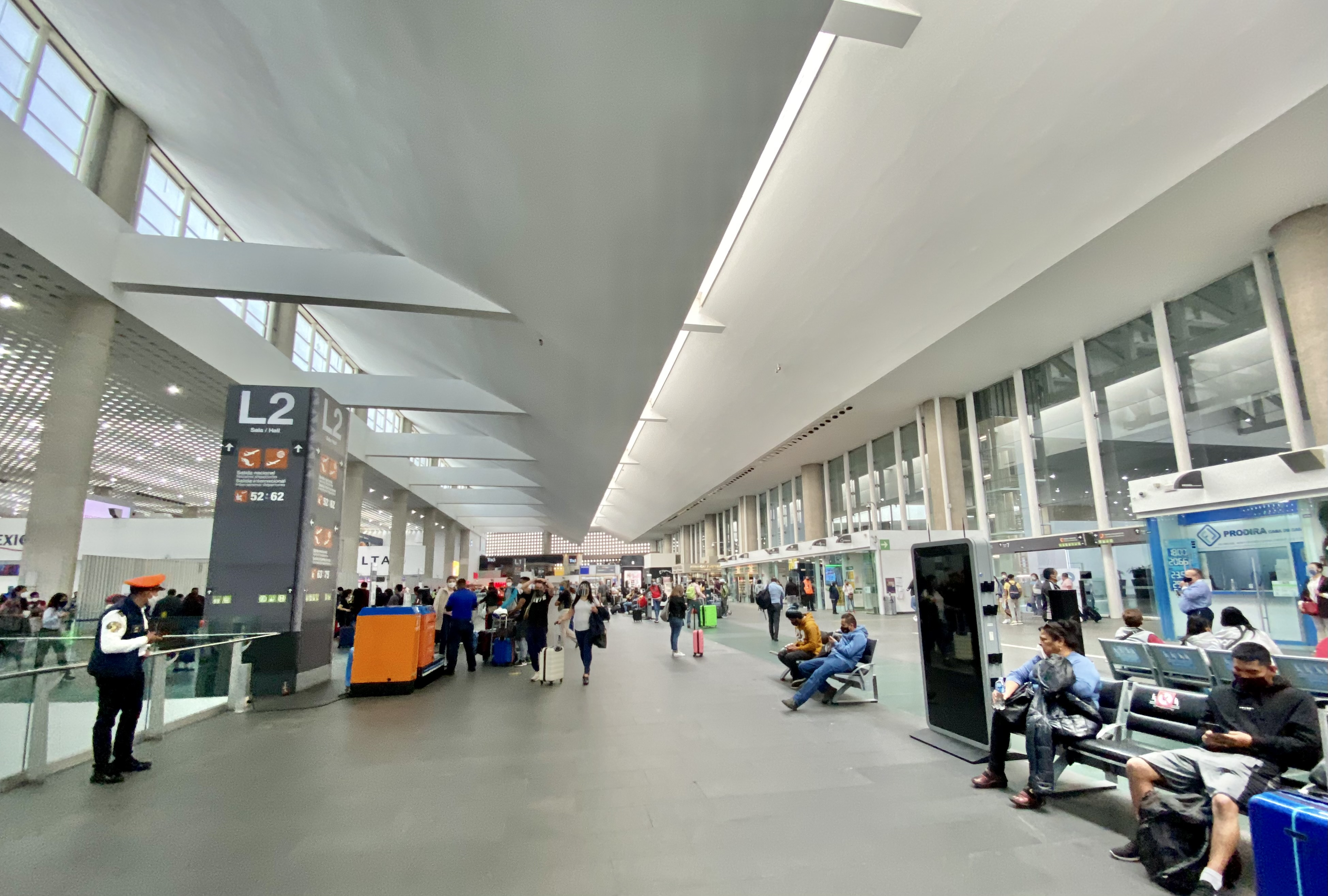
Terminal 2 Check-in hall

Terminal 2 began operations on November 15, 2007, with inaugural flights by Delta Air Lines, followed by Aeroméxico, Copa Airlines and LATAM. It was officially inaugurated by President Felipe Calderón on March 26, 2008. Despite the initial plan for all SkyTeam member airlines to use the terminal, Air France and KLM opted to remain at Terminal 1. Terminal 2 currently serves as the main hub for Aeromexico. Due to capacity constraints at Terminal 2, some of Aeromexico's domestic services temporarily operated from Terminal 1 between 2021 and 2023.

The terminal spans 288,000 square metres (3,100,000 sq ft). Arrivals are handled on the lower level, featuring 15 baggage claim carousels, customs and immigration facilities, and an arrivals hall with a long-distance bus terminal. The upper level contains three check-in areas (L1-L3), two security checkpoints, and a main concourse connected to three piers. A mezzanine level houses VIP lounges and administrative offices.

The three piers contain food courts, duty-free shops, and 30 gates (numbered 52–81), all equipped with jet bridges. The northern pier contains gates 52–62, and the southern pier has gates 63–75. In 2020, the terminal was expanded with the inauguration of Pier L, located at the southern end, adjacent to the airport's boundary with Boulevard Fuerza Aérea Mexicana. Gates 75–81, used by Aeromexico Connect services with narrow-body aircraft, are situated in this pier. Due to the building's narrow layout, it lacks commercial amenities. Ten remote stands are also accessible via bus.

Terminal 2 includes several VIP lounges, such as the HSBC Premier Lounge, by HSBC, Salón Beyond by Banamex, Salón Centurión by American Express, Salón Premier Nacional and Salón Premier Internacional by Aeroméxico, Terraza Premier by Heineken and Aeroméxico, and VIPort Lounge. Hotel services include the 287-room NH Hotel, and izZzleep Hotel Terminal 2. Parking facilities accommodate 3,000 vehicles.

Terminal 2 is served by Aeroméxico, Aeroméxico Connect, Copa Airlines, and Delta Air Lines.

=== Inter-terminal transportation ===
The two terminals are 3 kilometres (1.9 mi) apart. Passengers have two landside transport options: a bus shuttle service, branded as "inter-terminal transportation", connects Terminal 1 (Entrance 7) and Terminal 2 (Entrance 4). The Aerotrén people mover, available only to passengers with a boarding pass and airline crew, operates at a speed of 45 kilometres per hour (28 mph) and has a daily capacity of 7,800 passengers.

=== Terminal 3 (proposed) ===
The intended construction of Terminal 3 was cancelled during the global COVID-19 pandemic in 2020. Furthermore, the opening of the Felipe Ángeles Airport in Mexico State in 2022 may pose challenges for the Mexico City Airport in achieving pre-pandemic levels.

== Airlines and destinations ==
=== Passenger ===
As of August 2026, the airport serves 46 domestic and 64 international destinations across the Americas, Europe, and Asia. Aeromexico serves the largest number of cities from any Latin American hub and it also operates the highest number of departures and destinations from the airport, followed by Volaris and Viva. The leading foreign airlines at the airport in 2025 were American, United, Delta, Avianca and Copa.

General sources:

Airlines	Destinations
Aeroméxico	Acapulco, Aguascalientes, Amsterdam, Austin, Barcelona, Bogotá, Boston, Buenos Aires–Ezeiza, Cali, Cancún, Cartagena, Chetumal, Chicago–O'Hare, Chihuahua, Ciudad del Carmen, Ciudad Juárez, Cozumel, Culiacán, Dallas/Fort Worth, Denver, Fort Lauderdale (begins January 14, 2027), Guadalajara, Guatemala City, Havana, Hermosillo, Houston–Intercontinental, Huatulco, La Paz, Las Vegas, León/El Bajío, Lima, London–Heathrow, Los Angeles, Madrid, Manzanillo, Mazatlán, Medellín–JMC, Mérida, Mexicali, Miami, Milan–Malpensa (begins March 28, 2027), Montego Bay (begins March 18, 2027), Monterrey, Montréal–Trudeau, Nassau (begins March 19, 2027), New York–JFK, Newark, Oaxaca, Orange County (begins January 11, 2027), Orlando, Panama City–Tocumen, Paris–Charles de Gaulle, Philadelphia, Phoenix–Sky Harbor, Portland (OR) (resumes January 21, 2027), Puerto Escondido, Puerto Vallarta, Punta Cana, Querétaro, Quito, Reynosa, Rome–Fiumicino, San Antonio, San Francisco, San José (CR), San José del Cabo, San Juan (begins June 24, 2027), San Luis Potosí, San Salvador, Santiago de Chile, Santo Domingo–Las Américas, São Paulo–Guarulhos, Seattle/Tacoma, Seoul–Incheon,^{a} Tampa, Tampico, Tapachula, Tijuana, Tokyo–Narita, Toronto–Pearson, Torreón/Gómez Palacio, Tuxtla Gutiérrez, Vancouver, Veracruz, Villahermosa, Washington–Dulles
Aeroméxico Connect	Acapulco, Aguascalientes, Austin, Campeche, Chetumal, Chihuahua, Ciudad del Carmen, Ciudad Juárez, Ciudad Obregón, Colima, Cozumel, Culiacán, Durango, Guatemala City, Hermosillo, Houston–Intercontinental, Huatulco, Ixtapa/Zihuatanejo, La Paz, León/El Bajío, Los Mochis, Managua, Manzanillo, Matamoros, Mazatlán, Mérida, Minatitlán/Coatzacoalcos, Morelia, Nashville (begins June 13, 2027), New Orleans (begins June 17, 2027), Nuevo Laredo, Oaxaca, Puerto Vallarta, Querétaro, Raleigh/Durham, Reynosa, Saltillo (resumes March 18, 2027), San Antonio, San José (CR), San José del Cabo, San Luis Potosí, San Pedro Sula, Santo Domingo–Las Américas, Tampico, Tapachula, Tegucigalpa/Comayagua, Tepic, Torreón/Gómez Palacio, Tuxtla Gutiérrez, Veracruz, Villahermosa, Zacatecas
Air Canada	Montréal–Trudeau, Toronto–Pearson, Vancouver
Air France	Paris–Charles de Gaulle
All Nippon Airways	Tokyo–Narita
American Airlines	Charlotte, Chicago–O'Hare, Dallas/Fort Worth, Los Angeles, Miami, New York–JFK, Phoenix–Sky Harbor
Avianca	Bogotá, Medellín–JMC
Avianca Costa Rica	San José (CR)
Avianca El Salvador	San Salvador
British Airways	London–Heathrow
China Southern Airlines	Shenzhen^{b}
Copa Airlines	Panama City–Tocumen
Delta Air Lines	Atlanta, Detroit, Minneapolis/St. Paul, New York–JFK, Salt Lake City; Seasonal: Los Angeles
Emirates	Barcelona, Dubai–International^{c}
Flair Airlines	Toronto–Pearson, Vancouver
Hainan Airlines	Beijing–Capital
Iberia	Madrid
KLM	Amsterdam
LATAM Brasil	São Paulo–Guarulhos
LATAM Chile	Santiago de Chile
LATAM Perú	Lima
Lufthansa	Frankfurt, Munich
Turkish Airlines	Istanbul
United Airlines	Chicago–O'Hare, Houston–Intercontinental, Newark, San Francisco, Washington–Dulles; Seasonal: Denver
Viva	Cancún, Chetumal, Chicago–O'Hare, Chihuahua, Ciudad Juárez, Dallas/Fort Worth, Guadalajara, Hermosillo, Houston–Intercontinental, Huatulco, Las Vegas, Los Angeles, Mazatlán, Mérida, Monterrey, New York–JFK, Oaxaca, Puerto Escondido, Puerto Vallarta, Reynosa, San Antonio, San José del Cabo, Tijuana, Torreón/Gómez Palacio, Tuxtla Gutiérrez, Veracruz, Villahermosa
Volaris	Acapulco, Cancún, Chetumal, Chicago–O'Hare, Chihuahua, Ciudad Juárez, Cozumel, Culiacán, Dallas/Fort Worth, Denver, Guadalajara, Guatemala City, Hermosillo, Houston–Intercontinental, Huatulco, Ixtapa/Zihuatanejo, La Paz, Las Vegas, Lima, Los Angeles, Los Mochis, Mazatlán, Mérida, Mexicali, Miami, Monterrey, Oakland, Oaxaca, Orlando, Puerto Escondido, Puerto Vallarta, Sacramento, San Antonio, San José del Cabo, Tapachula, Tijuana, Tuxtla Gutiérrez, Villahermosa
Volaris Costa Rica	Guatemala City, San José (CR)
Volaris El Salvador	San Salvador
WestJet	Calgary

Notes:
^{a}: Aeromexico's flight to Seoul–Incheon operates via Monterrey, but the flight from Seoul–Incheon to Mexico City is non-stop.

^{b}: China Southern's flights to Shenzhen make a stop in Tijuana. However, the airline does not have traffic rights to transport passengers solely between Mexico City and Tijuana. The flight from Shenzhen to Mexico City is non-stop.

^{c}: Emirates’ flights to and from Dubai make a stop in Barcelona.

^{d}: Hainan Airlines’ flights to and from Beijing–Capital make a stop in Tijuana. However, the airline does not have traffic rights to transport passengers solely between Mexico City and Tijuana.

^{e}: Turkish Airlines’ flights to Istanbul make a stop in Cancún. However, the airline does not have traffic rights to transport passengers solely between Mexico City and Cancún. The flight from Istanbul to Mexico City is non-stop.

=== Cargo ===
As of January 2022, 20 cargo airlines operated direct flights from Mexico City Airport to destinations across Europe, the Americas, the Middle East, Africa, and East Asia. However, in July 2023, a government decree relocated all cargo operations to Felipe Ángeles International Airport.

=== Destination maps ===
Domestic destinations from Mexico City International Airport
Red = Year-round destination
Blue = Future destination
Green = Seasonal destination
North American, Central American and Caribbean destinations from Mexico City International Airport
Red = Year-round destination
Blue = Future destination
Green = Seasonal destination
South American destinations from Mexico City International Airport
Red = Year-round destination
Blue = Future destination
Green = Seasonal destination
European and Asian destinations from Mexico City International Airport
Red = Year-round destination
Blue = Future destination
Green = Seasonal destination

== Statistics ==
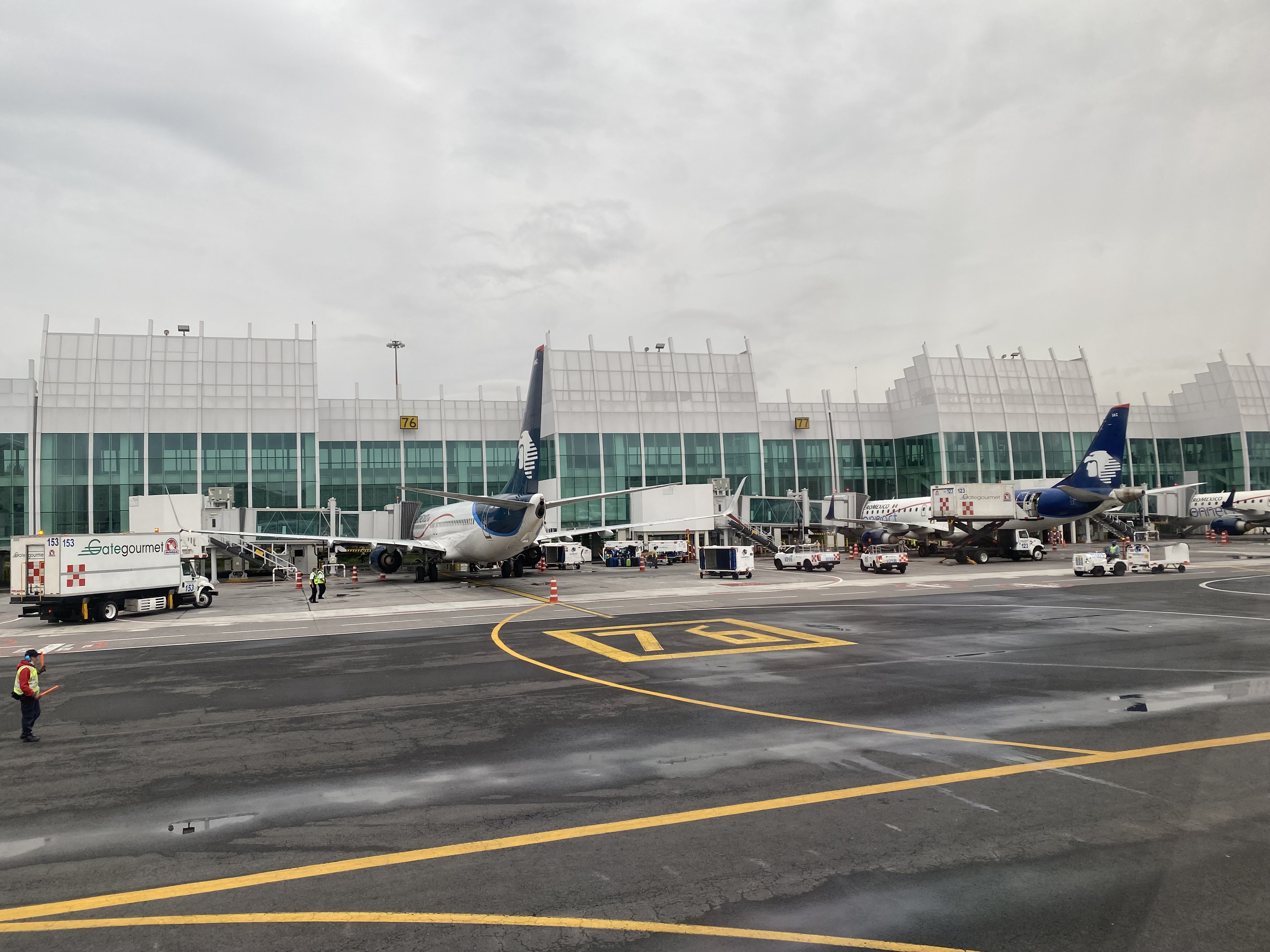
Terminal 2 Pier L airside

In 2025, Mexico City International Airport handled 44,605,800 passengers, making it the busiest airport in Mexico and the third-busiest in Latin America. It held the top spot in the region from 2016 to 2023 but its market share dropped since the opening of Mexico City-AIFA International Airport. It remains the busiest airport in North America outside the United States. On a typical day, over 120,000 passengers travel through the airport.

The broader Mexico City Airport System, which includes Mexico City-AIFA International Airport and Toluca International Airport, handled 53,591,517 passengers in 2025, making it the second-busiest metropolitan airport system in Latin America and 34th globally.

For international traffic, the airport served 17,482,146 passengers, ranking second in Mexico and third in Latin America. The Shenzhen–Mexico City route by China Southern ranked as the 9th longest flight globally in 2024, covering 14,124 km.

With 313,467 aircraft movements in 2025, it retained its position as the busiest airport in Mexico and among the most active in Latin America. Despite having only two runways, it remains one of the busiest dual-runway airports globally.

In cargo operations, the airport processed 252,555.6 tons in 2025, ranking second in the country after Mexico City-AIFA International Airport. The airport directly supports 35,000 jobs and indirectly influences another 15,000 in the surrounding area.

Passenger statistics
Year	Domestic	% change	International	% change	Total	% change
2025	27,123,430	▼4.0	17,482,146	▲2.1	44,605,576	▼1.7
2024	28,243,160	▼12.0	17,116,325	▲4.8	45,359,485	▼6.3
2023	32,082,959	▲1.2	16,332,734	▲12.1	48,415,693	▲4.7
2022	31,694,588	▲22.4	14,563,933	▲43.2	46,258,521	▲28.3
2021	25,883,725	▲59.9	10,172,889	▲75.5	36,056,614	▲64.0
2020	16,186,836	▼50.4	5,794,875	▼67.2	21,981,711	▼56.3
2019	32,660,267	▲7.1	17,647,782	▲2.6	50,308,049	▲5.5
2018	30,495,723	▲5.2	17,204,824	▲9.2	47,700,547	▲6.6
2017	28,979,063	▲4.8	15,753,355	▲12.1	44,732,418	▲7.2
2016	27,654,171	▲7.7	14,056,083	▲10.2	41,710,254	▲8.5
2015	25,674,622	▲12.8	12,758,456	▲10.9	38,433,078	▲12.2
2014	22,753,467	▲8.9	11,502,272	▲8.2	34,255,739	▲8.6
2013	20,900,194	▲6.2	10,634,444	▲8.4	31,534,638	▲6.9
2012	19,678,117	▲12.7	9,813,436	▲10.2	29,491,553	▲11.84
2011	17,461,438	▲12.03	8,907,423	▲4.26	26,368,861	▲9.28
2010	15,587,068	▼3.44	8,543,467	▲5.47	24,130,535	▼0.46
2009	16,142,330	▼3.8	8,100,726	▼14.1	24,243,056	▼7.5
2008	16,777,773	▲1.1	9,432,444	▲1.5	26,210,217	▲1.3
2007	16,592,422	▲4.7	9,289,240	▲4.6	25,881,662	▲4.7
2006	15,848,060	▲2.1	8,879,236	▲3.3	24,727,296	▲2.5
2005	15,523,755	-	8,591,797	-	24,115,552	-

Aircraft movements
Year	Domestic	% change	International	% change	Total	% change
2025	197,986	▼9.6	115,481	▼6.8	313,467	▼2.8
2024	214,333	▼14.8	108,094	▼3.3	322,427	▼11.2
2023	251,434	▼7.7	111,837	▼2.7	363,271	▼6.2
2022	272,505	▲14.7	114,945	▲27.3	387,450	▲18.2
2021	237,570	▲33.2	90,319	▲47.7	327,889	▲36.9
2020	178,247	▼45.0	61,120	▼55.1	239,367	▼48.0
2019	323,858	▲1.9	136,129	▼3.4	459,987	▲0.3
2018	317,722	▲0.7	140,866	▲4.9	458,588	▲2.0
2017	315,409	▼3.6	134,255	▲11.1	449,664	▲0.3
2016	327,273	▲4.2	120,874	▲7.3	448,150	▲5.0
2015	314,098	▲3.5	112,663	▲9.5	426,761	▲5.0
2014	307,017	▲4.3	102,937	▲4.7	409,954	▲4.4
2013	294,279	▲3.3	98,287	▲5.9	392,566	▲3.9
2012	284,971	▲7.1	92,772	▲10.4	377,743	▲7.9
2011	265,986	▲2.51	84,046	▲4.50	350,032	▲2.98
2010	259,470	▼3.3	80,428	▲0.5	339,898	▼2.4
2009	268,252	▼3.3	80,054	▼10.3	348,306	▼5.0
2008	277,294	▼3.3	89,267	▼2.3	366,561	▼3.1
2007	286,821	▲6.3	91,340	▲6.4	378,161	▲6.3
2006	269,719	▲6.8	85,874	▲7.1	355,593	▲6.9
2005	252,472	-	80,151	-	332,623	-

Cargo [metric tons]
Year	Domestic	% change	International	% change	Total	% change
2025	59,077.3	▲5.7	193,478.3	▲5.1	252,555.6	▲5.1
2024	55,905.2	▼23.3	184,129.4	▼50.9	240,034.6	▼46.4
2023	72,921.4	▼16.3	374,965.8	▼22.5	447,887.2	▼21.5
2022	87,101.2	▼8.7	483,707.8	▲2.4	570,809.0	▲0.5
2021	95,377.9	▲19.9	472,401.2	▲21.0	567,779.1	▲18.4
2020	79,536.3	▼24.1	390,178.0	▼13.5	469,714.3	▼15.5
2019	104,832.5	▲3.0	451,309.8	▼6.0	556,142.3	▼4.4
2018	101,774.72	▲2.49	479,900.56	▲9.58	581,675.28	▲8.27
2017	99,303.94	▲8.15	437,958.75	▲11.83	537,262.69	▲11.13
2016	91,820.00	▲11.84	391,613.40	▲7.35	483,433.40	▲8.17
2015	82,100.42	▲21.92	364,814.69	▲10.14	446,915.11	▲12.13
2014	67,341.85	▲5.75	331,214.62	▲5.85	398,556.47	▲5.83
2013	63,678.54	▼19.05	312,911.31	▼1.71	376,589.85	▼5.15
2012	78,666.10	▼4.01	318,351.98	▼3.38	397,018.08	▼3.51
2011	81,953.37	▼3.41	329,502.22	▲6.90	411,455.59	▲4.68
2010	84,846.88	▲1.01	308,228.992	▲29.98	393,075.87	▲22.40
2009	83,999.43	▼13.47	237,134.01	▼15.01	321,133.44	▼14.61
2008	97,070.08	-	279,025.63	-	376,095.71	-

=== Busiest routes ===
Busiest domestic routes from MEX (Jan–Dec 2025)
Rank	Airport	Passengers
1	Cancún, Quintana Roo	1,570,812
2	Monterrey, Nuevo León	1,555,840
3	Guadalajara, Jalisco	1,356,340
4	Tijuana, Baja California	997,169
5	Mérida, Yucatán	793,007
6	Puerto Vallarta, Jalisco	496,352
7	San José del Cabo, Baja California Sur	415,089
8	Villahermosa, Tabasco	412,682
9	Hermosillo, Sonora	393,335
10	Chihuahua, Chihuahua	378,066

Busiest international routes from MEX (Jan–Dec 2025)
Rank	City	Passengers
1	Madrid, Spain	574,060
2	Los Angeles, United States	467,074
3	Bogotá, Colombia	416,041
4	Houston–Intercontinental, United States	403,980
5	Miami, United States	378,699
6	New York–JFK, United States	361,659
7	Chicago–O'Hare, United States	360,350
8	Dallas/Fort Worth, United States	317,870
9	Panama City–Tocumen, Panama	315,393
10	Paris–Charles de Gaulle, France	274,608

== Ground transportation ==
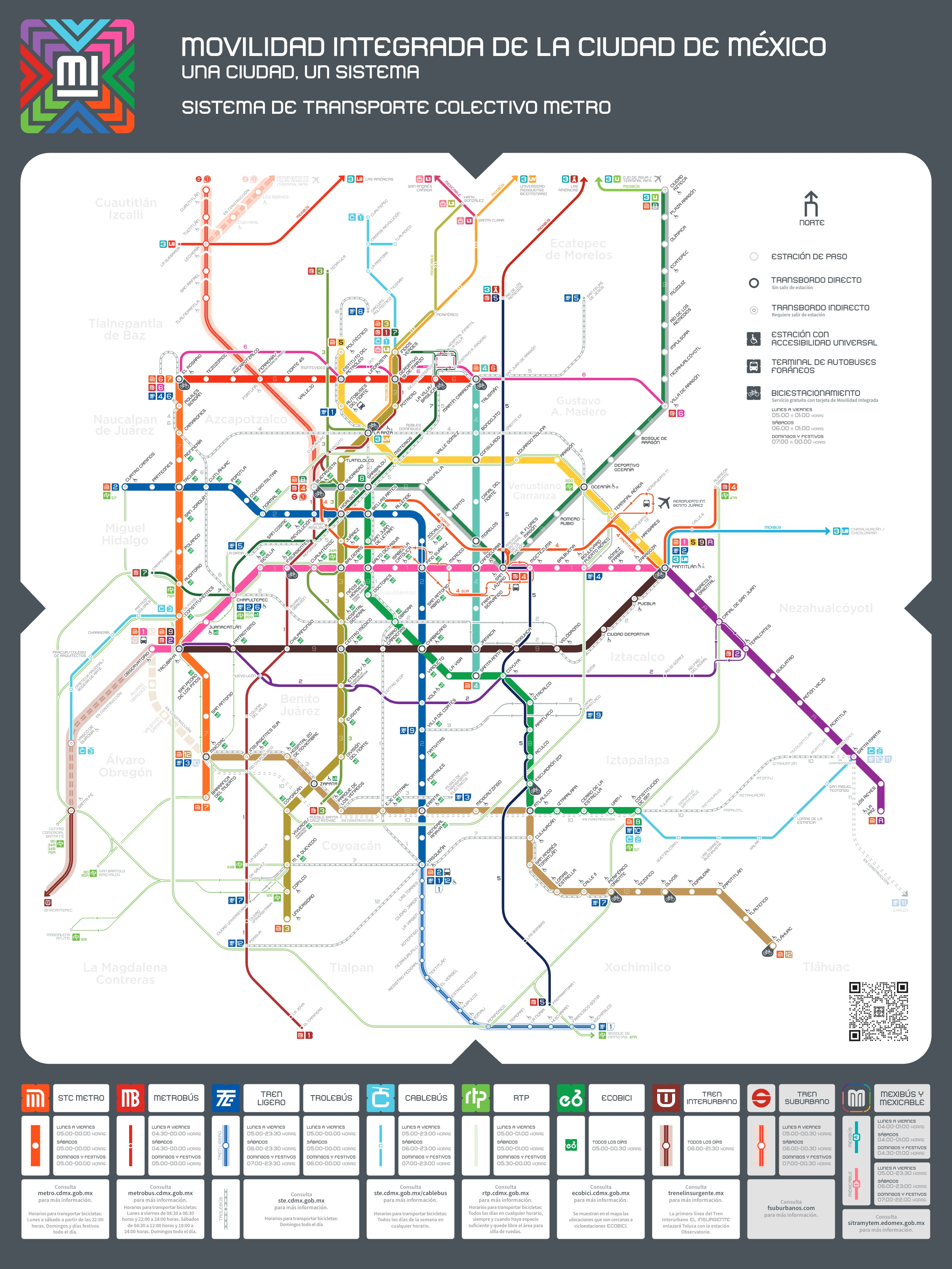
Mexico City public transportation map

=== Metrobús ===
Metrobús Line 4 provides direct express service between both terminals and Amajac Metrobús Line 4 station, passing through San Lázaro Metro Station. San Lázaro Metro Station is served by Metro Lines 1 and B, and located adjacent to the TAPO (Terminal de Autobuses de Pasajeros de Oriente), the largest long-distance bus terminal in Mexico City. TAPO offers bus services to central, eastern, and southern Mexico.

Metrobús stops are located at Entrance 7 of Terminal 1 and Entrance 4 of Terminal 2. Passengers can access the service by obtaining a Metrobús Card from vending machines at these bus stops. The fare to San Lázaro is 30 Mexican Pesos, with the card itself costing 21 pesos as of 2024. Service operates daily from 05:00 to 00:00.

Service	Destinations [departing from the airport]	Operator
to Amajac	Amajac Metrobús Line 4 station, passing through San Lázaro Metro Station/(TAPO bus terminal)	Metrobús

=== Metro Station ===
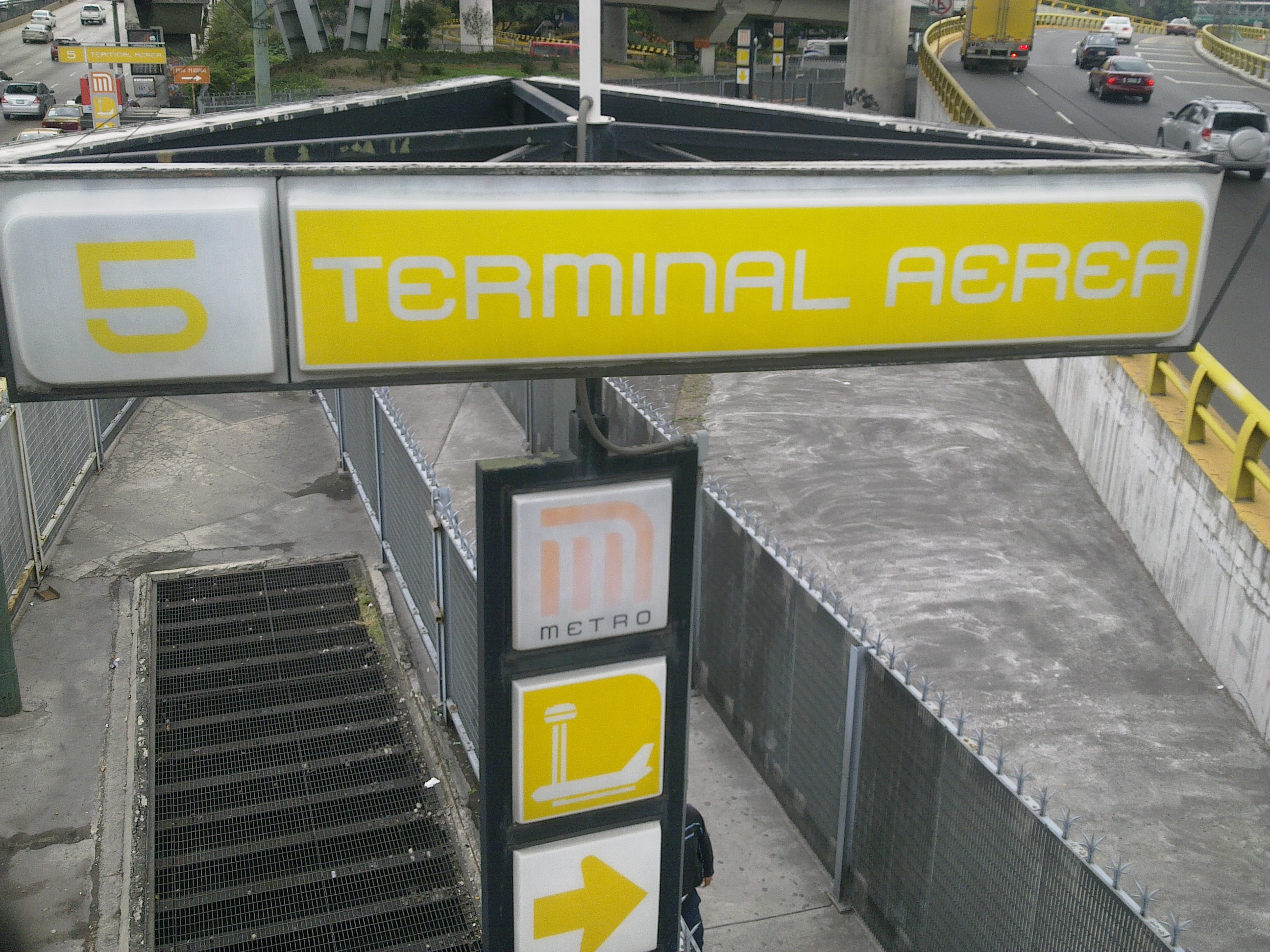
Terminal Aérea metro station entrance

Terminal 1 is connected to the Terminal Aérea metro station, which is part of Mexico City Metro Line 5 running from Pantitlán to Politécnico. It is linked to Terminal 1 through an open-air walkway starting at Entrance 1. Terminal Aérea is also served by trolleybus line 4 northbound, which follows a route similar to Metro Line 2 before diverging toward El Rosario metro station.

Terminal 2 lacks a nearby metro station. However, it is within 800 metres (2,600 ft) of Pantitlán metro station, served by Metro Lines 1, 5, 9, A, and multiple local bus routes.

=== Long-distance Buses ===
In Terminal 1, the long-distance bus terminal, also known as Terminal de Autobuses or Autobuses Foráneos, serves various bus companies. Access is from the international departures section on the top floor, near the food court, through an elevated walkway spanning the entrance road. Ticketing counters are available, and platforms can be reached via escalators to the ground floor.

Terminal 1 also features a private terminal for the ADO bus company, named ADO Llegadas Nacionales. Situated next to the Hotel Camino Real, it can be accessed through a secondary elevated walkway spanning the entrance road. This walkway begins at the domestic section on the top floor, in front of Hall B, above Entrance 4.

In Terminal 2, the long-distance bus terminal, labeled "Transportación Terrestre," or "Autobuses Foráneos" is located on the ground floor next to arrivals Hall Q.

Long-distance bus services
Terminal 1 Terminal de Autobuses Foráneos
Bus Company	Type of Service	Destinations
ADO	Long-distance coach	Puebla CAPU, Puebla Paseo Destino
ADO conecta	Shuttle service	Mexico City-AIFA
Caminante	Long-distance coach	Toluca Tollocan
Estrella Blanca	Long-distance coach	Pachuca
Estrella Roja	Long-distance coach	Puebla CAPU, Puebla Paseo Destino
Primera Plus	Long-distance coach	Querétaro Central, Querétaro 5 de Febrero, Celaya, San Juan del Río
Pullman de Morelos	Long-distance coach	Cuernavaca Casino
Terminal 1 ADO Llegadas Nacionales
ADO	Long distance couch	Córdoba, Orizaba, Veracruz
ADO Aeropuerto	Shuttle service	Xalapa
ADO GL	First class long-distance coach	Oaxaca
Diamante	Long-distance coach	Acapulco Costera
Terminal 2 Autobuses Foráneos
ADO	Long-distance coach	Puebla CAPU, Puebla Paseo Destino
Caminante	Long-distance coach	Toluca Tollocan
Estrella Roja	Long-distance coach	Puebla CAPU, Puebla Paseo Destino
Primera Plus	Long-distance coach	Querétaro Central, Querétaro 5 de Febrero, Celaya, San Juan del Río

=== Bus service to Felipe Angeles Airport ===
Transportation options to Mexico City's secondary airport, Felipe Ángeles International Airport, are limited. Shuttle services from Terminal 1 are provided by ADO and Aeropuertos y Servicios Auxiliares.

=== Authorized taxis ===
Taxis operate in Terminals 1 and 2 and there are two models of service: ordinary service in a sedan-type vehicle for four passengers, and executive service in eight-passenger vans. There are five taxi groups in operation, and these are the only taxis authorized by the Mexican Department of Transportation (SCT).

== Accidents and incidents ==
- On September 26, 1949, a Mexicana de Aviacion DC-3 crashed into the Popocatepetl volcano while approaching the airport with clouds and turbulence en route from Tapachula; all 23 people on board, including actress Blanca Estela Pavon and senator Gabriel Ramos Millan, died.
- On April 10, 1968, an Aerovías Rojas Douglas R4D-3 crashed on approach, killing all eighteen people on board. The aircraft was operating a domestic scheduled passenger flight, which was the airline's inaugural flight from Aguascalientes International Airport to Mexico City.
- On October 31, 1979, Western Airlines Flight 2605 crash-landed. The crew of the DC-10 landed on a closed runway and hit construction vehicles on the runway. There were 73 fatalities (including one on the ground) and 16 survivors.
- On December 12, 1981, a bomb exploded inside the passenger cabin of a parked Aeronica Boeing 727-100, tearing a hole into the fuselage. The captain, two flight attendants, and a groundworker were injured. They had been on board the aircraft for pre-departure checks for a scheduled passenger flight to San Salvador and onwards to Managua's Augusto C. Sandino International Airport.
- An Aero California DC-9-15 overran a runway on July 21, 2004, during an intense storm at the airport. The torrential downpour was so intense that visibility was barely 50 meters. The control tower had to ask that several vehicles go out to comb the airfield to find out where the aircraft was. There were no victims, but the aircraft was scrapped. A woman died later due to a heart attack.
- On November 4, 2008, a Mexican Interior Ministry Learjet 45 crashed on approach around 18:45 local time. On board was Mexican Secretary of the Interior Juan Camilo Mouriño, who was a top aide to President Felipe Calderón. Mouriño was in charge of the fight against the drug trade in Mexico. Also on board was José Luis Santiago Vasconcelos, former assistant attorney general and current head of the federal technical secretariat for implementing the recent constitutional reforms on criminal justice and public security. All eight on board died, along with eight others on the ground. 40 others on the ground were injured. The crash was attributed to pilot error.
- On September 9, 2009, hijacked Aeroméxico Flight 576 landed at Mexico City International Airport from Cancún International Airport.
- On September 13, 2009, a Lufthansa Cargo McDonnell-Douglas MD-11 was damaged in a heavy landing. Post-landing inspection revealed that there were wrinkles in the fuselage skin and the nose gear was bent. According to a Lufthansa spokesman, the aircraft would be repaired and returned to full service.

== See also ==
- List of the busiest airports in Mexico
- List of airports in Mexico
- List of airports by ICAO code: M
- List of busiest airports in North America
- List of the busiest airports in Latin America
- List of busiest city airport systems by passenger traffic
- List of cities with more than one commercial airport
- Transportation in Mexico
- Transport in Mexico City
- Tourism in Mexico
- List of Mexican military installations
- Mexican Air Force
- Valley of Mexico
- Greater Mexico City
- Mexico City Texcoco Airport
- Felipe Ángeles International Airport
