= Indigenous American philosophy =

Philosophies of the first inhabitants of the Americas

Indigenous American philosophy is the philosophy of the Indigenous peoples of the Americas. An Indigenous philosopher is an Indigenous American person who practices philosophy and draws upon the history, culture, language, and traditions of the Indigenous peoples of the Americas. Many different traditions of philosophy exist in the Americas, and have from Precolumbian times.

Indigenous-American philosophical thought consists of a wide variety of beliefs and traditions among different American cultures. Among some of U.S. Native American communities, there is a belief in a metaphysical principle called the 'Great Spirit' (Siouan: wakȟáŋ tȟáŋka; Algonquian: gitche manitou). Another proposed widely shared concept was that of orenda ('spiritual power'). According to Whiteley (1998), for the Native Americans, "mind is critically informed by transcendental experience (dreams, visions and so on) as well as by reason." The practices to access these transcendental experiences are termed shamanism. Another feature of the Indigenous American worldviews was their extension of ethics to non-human animals and plants.

== Epistemology and Science ==
The study of knowledge, belief, and the ways in which people acquire and process information (aka epistemology) in Indigenous cultures can be somewhat different than in mainstream Western philosophy. Vine Deloria Jr. often demonstrates in his work how Native American epistemology is found in ceremonies, community traditions and observation of nature and natural symbolism, in addition to more common academic approaches. Emphasis on Indigenous language and culture is a vital component of Native American epistemology, with language seen as essential to understanding psychology and different states of consciousness.

Hester and Cheney have written about the strong link between nature and the interpretation of knowledge within Native American cultures. They believe that the mind interacts with the environment in a very active, conscious way.

== Ontology of gender ==
Anne Waters has described a "nondiscrete ontology of being" in the context of gender.

== Regional traditions ==
=== North America ===
In North America, Indigenous groups North of Mesoamerica often lack pre-colonial written histories. However, some oral traditions survived colonization. A common symbol for these groups were the six directions. Many considered the directions east, west, north, south, up, and down to be sacred to their understanding of the world. Some believe that this symbol cements a sense of place among the Indigenous groups who share it.

Among the Hopi, there is a concept known as hopivotskwani, translating roughly to "the Hopi path of life". It entails behaving with a peaceful disposition, cooperation, humility, and respect. Hopi philosophy teaches that life is a journey, to be lived in harmony with the natural world. Thus, the Hopi believe that following hopivotskwani will lead to positive outcomes not only in interpersonal relationships, but also in interactions with nature, for example ensuring sufficient rainfall and a good harvest.

As a rule, contemporary Pueblo peoples are very reluctant to share their traditional philosophical and spiritual worldviews with outsiders. This can be attributed to several factors, among them abuse of trust by early anthropologists and colonial Spanish intolerance for traditional Puebloan religions.

=== Central America ===
Perhaps the best documented philosophical tradition of the Precolumbian and early colonial era is that of the Aztecs, a Nahuatl-speaking people who established a large and sophisticated empire in central Mexico prior to being conquered by the Spanish. Mesoamerican thought and philosophy is notable for its extensive usage of metaphor to explain abstract concepts.

The Aztecs thought of philosophy in more or less pragmatic and practical terms. A central feature of Aztec philosophy was the concept of teotl, a Nahuatl term for the animating force of the cosmos and an ever-acting and dynamic mover. Teotl in theological terms could also symbolize a type of pantheism.

Nahua philosophy was an intellectual tradition developed by individuals called tlamatini ('those who know something') and its ideas are preserved in various Aztec codices and fragmentary texts. Some of these philosophers are known by name, such as Nezahualcoyotl, Aquiauhtzin, Xayacamach, Tochihuitzin coyolchiuhqui and Cuauhtencoztli. These authors were also poets and some of their work has survived in the original Nahuatl.

Aztec philosophers developed theories of metaphysics, epistemology, values, and aesthetics. Aztec ethics was focused on seeking tlamatiliztli ('knowledge', 'wisdom') which was based on moderation and balance in all actions as in the Nahua proverb "the middle good is necessary". The Nahua worldview posited the concept of an ultimate universal energy or force called Ōmeteōtl ('Dual Cosmic Energy') which sought a way to live in balance with a constantly changing, "slippery" world. The theory of Teotl can be seen as a form of Pantheism. According to James Maffie, Nahua metaphysics posited that teotl is "a single, vital, dynamic, vivifying, eternally self-generating and self-conceiving as well as self-regenerating and self-reconceiving sacred energy or force". This force was seen as the all-encompassing life force of the universe and as the universe itself.

=== South America ===
The Inca civilization also had an elite class of philosopher-scholars termed the amawtakuna or amautas who were important in the Inca education system as teachers of philosophy, theology, astronomy, poetry, law, music, morality and history. Young Inca nobles were educated in these disciplines at the state college of Yacha-huasi in Cuzco, where they also learned the art of the quipu. Incan philosophy (as well as the broader category of Andean thought) held that the universe is animated by a single dynamic life force (sometimes termed camaquen or camac, as well as upani and amaya). This singular force also arises as a set of dual complementary yet opposite forces. These "complementary opposites" are called yanantin and masintin. They are expressed as various polarities or dualities (such as male–female, dark–light, life and death, above and below) which interdependently contribute to the harmonious whole that is the universe through the process of reciprocity and mutual exchange called ayni. The Inca worldview also included the belief in a creator God (Viracocha) and reincarnation.

=== Coyote tales ===
Academic Brian Yazzie Burkhart shares this story of Coyote:

Coyote is wandering around in his usual way when he comes upon a prairie dog town. The prairie dogs laugh and curse at him. Coyote gets angry and wants revenge. The sun is high in the sky. Coyote decides that he wants clouds to come. He is starting to hate the prairie dogs and so thinks about rain. Just then a cloud appears.

Coyote says, "I wish it would rain on me." And that is what happened.

Coyote says, "I wish there were rain at my feet." And that is what happened.

"I want the rain up to my knees," Coyote says. And that is what happened.

"I want the rain up to my waist," he then says. And that is what happened.

Eventually, the entire land is flooded. Coyote's mistake is not letting what is right guide his actions, but instead acting entirely on his own motivations. This is a reminder that one must be careful about what one desires, and must keep in mind the things around us and how we relate to them. Burkhart terms this the principle of relatedness.
