= Polar concept argument =

A polar concept argument is a type of argument that posits the understanding of one concept, from the mere understanding of its polar opposite. A well-known instance of a polar concept argument is Gilbert Ryle's argument against scepticism (1960). According to Anthony Grayling's characterisation, Ryle's argument can be stated as follows:

There cannot be counterfeit coins, (...) unless there are genuine ones, nor crooked paths unless there are straight paths, nor tall men unless there are short men.

According to Ryle's polar concept argument, counterfeit and genuine coins come in pairs, and one cannot conceive of counterfeit coins without also capturing the essence of the genuine coins at the same time. When one grasps the essence of one polar concept, one also grasps immediately the essence of its polar opposite. Ryle's original argument (1960) runs as follows:

A country which had no coinage would offer no scope to counterfeiters. There would be nothing for them to manufacture or pass counterfeits of. They could, if they wished, manufacture and give away decorated disks of brass or lead, which the public might be pleased to get. But these would not be false coins. There can be false coins only where there are coins made of the proper materials by the proper authorities. In a country where there is a coinage, false coins can be manufactured and passed; and the counterfeiting might be so efficient that an ordinary citizen, unable to tell which were false and which were genuine coins, might become suspicious of the genuineness of any particular coin that he received.

A polar concept argument bears on some more or less strong version of dialectical monism, a philosophical doctrine that views reality as a unified whole, due to the complementarity of polar concepts.
