= Gabriel Ramos =

Gabriel Ramos may refer to:

- Gabriel Ramos Millán (1903–1949), Mexican politician
- Gabriel Ramos (motorcyclist) (born 1994), Venezuelan motorcycle racer
- Gabriel Ramos (footballer) (born 1996), Brazilian footballer
- Gabriel Ramos (politician), American politician, member of the New Mexico Senate
