= Ayapango =

- Town & Municipality
- Ayapango del Gabriel Ramos Millán
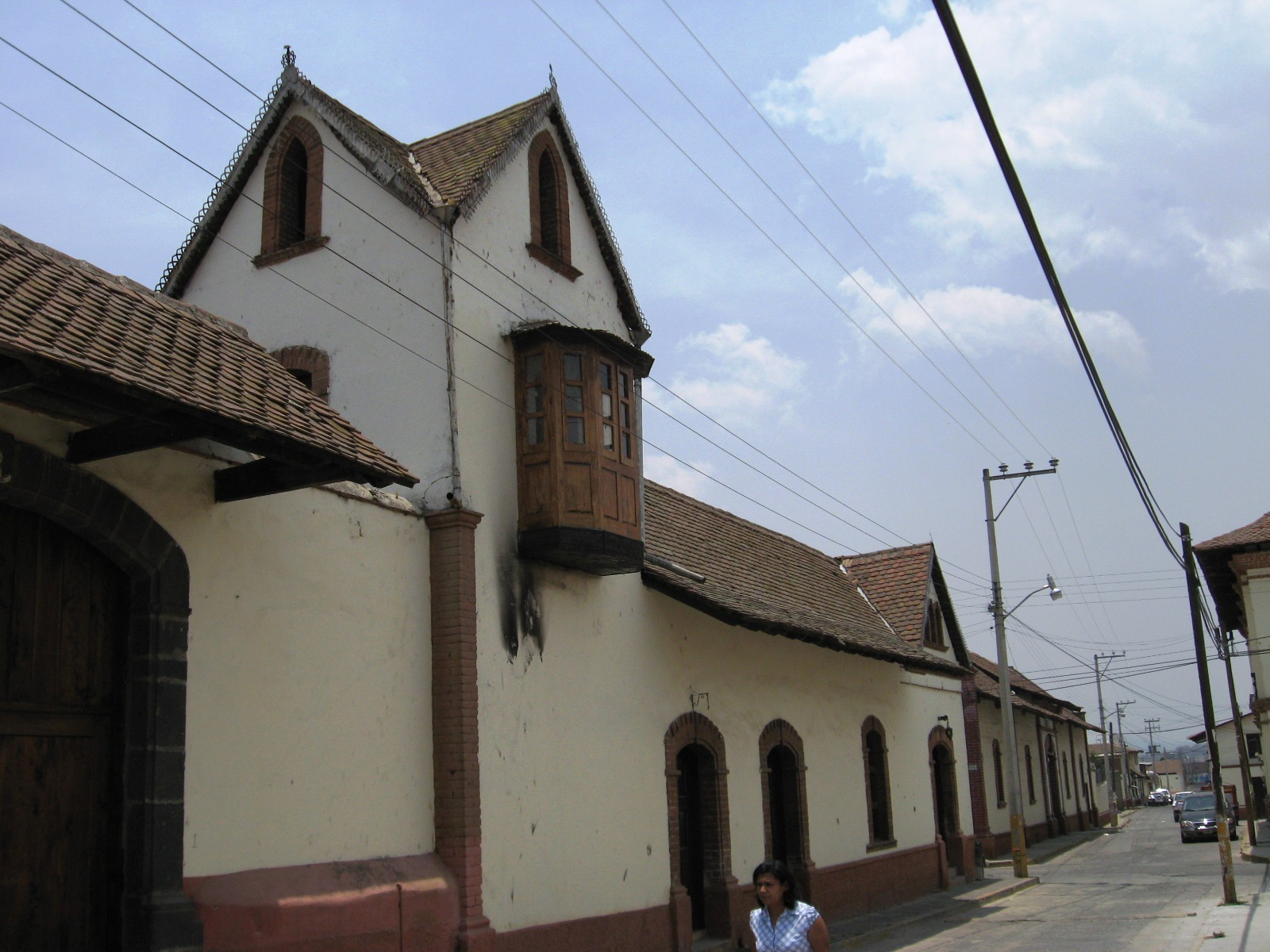

- Coat of arms

- Location in Mexico
- Coordinates: 19°07′35″N 98°48′10″W
- Country: Mexico
- State: State of Mexico
- Founded: 1563
- Municipal Status: 1868

Government
  - Municipal President: Pedro Alfonso Sánchez Solares 2013–2015
- Elevation (of seat): 2,440 m (8,010 ft)

Population (2010) Municipality
  - Municipality: 8,864
  - Seat: 3,072
- Time zone: UTC-6 (Central)
- Postal code (of seat): 56760
- Area code: 597
- Website: (in Spanish)

Ayapango is one of 125 municipalities located in the southeast portion of the State of Mexico, southeast of Mexico City. Its municipal seat and largest town is Ayapango de Gabriel Ramos Millán. Despite the fact that this municipality is distinctly rural, it falls within the Mexico City Metropolitan Area. The town is known for its "French style" (Spanish afrancesado) houses built early in the last century which have names which reflect something of their characteristics. The name Ayapango is derived from "eyapanco" which roughly translates to "place where three irrigation ditches meet." This town has been designated as a "Pueblo con Encanto" (Town with Charm) by the government of the State of Mexico.

== History of the town and municipality ==
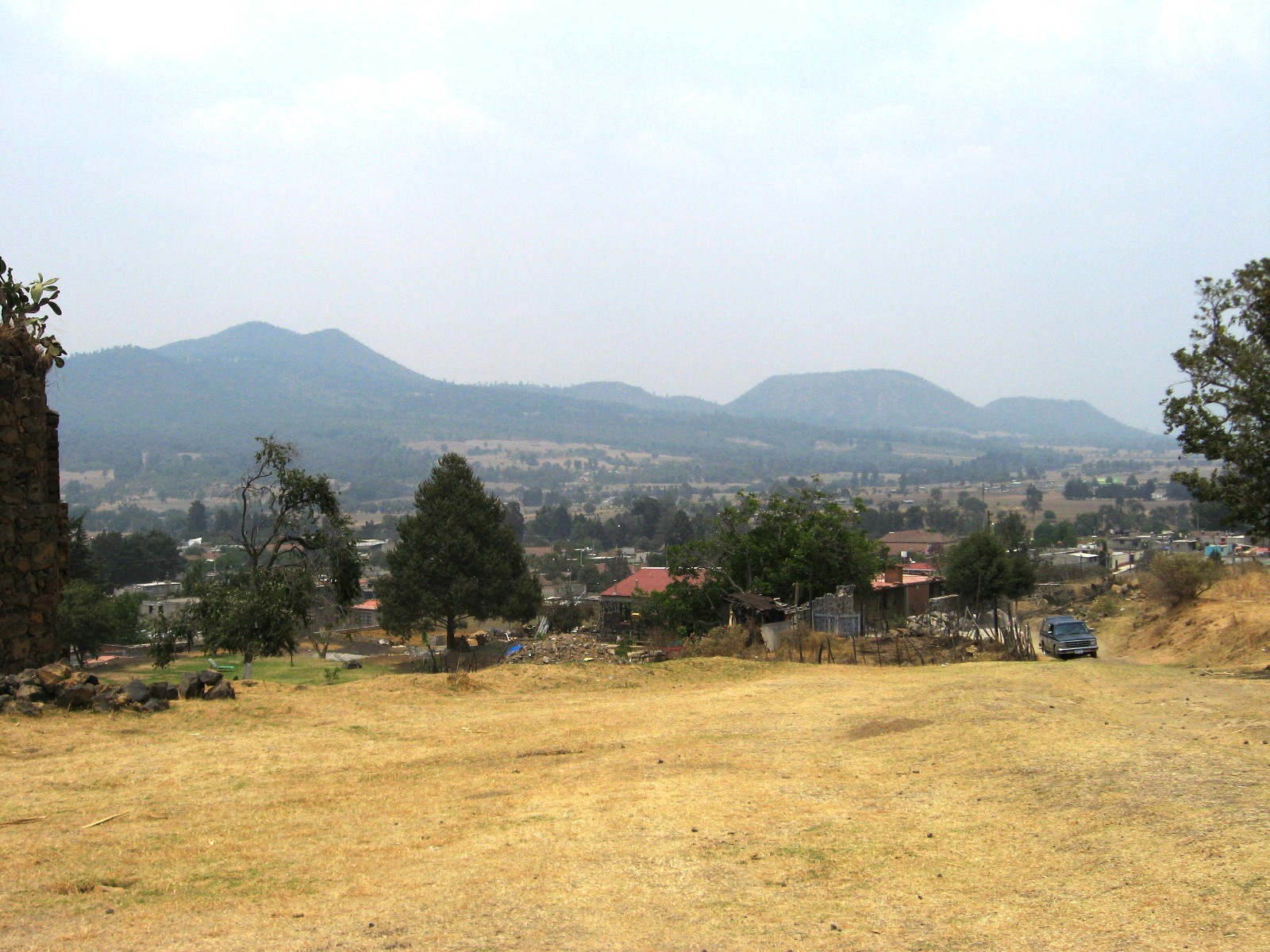
View of municipality from monastery ruins

The Chichimecas and Teotenancas came into the Valley of Chalco, including what is now Ayapango, in the 12th and 13th centuries. They settled and eventually formed alliances with tribes that were already here. These alliances eventually coalesced into the kingdom of Itztlacozauhcan Amecamecan under a lord named Atonaltzin.

The earliest recorded data concerning Ayapango itself goes back to 1430. It relates to a noble from here by the name of Aquiauhtzin Cuauhquiyahuacatzintli, who authored a song called "The Female Enemy" and made himself famous by singing it at the palace of Axayacatl in Tenochtitlan, the capital of the Aztecs. Axayacatl was so impressed with the song, he adopted Aquiauhtzin as his own son and gave him inheritance rights.

Sometime after this, records indicate that because of four-year drought, many here sold themselves to the Aztecs as slaves in order to survive. In 1479, winds caused crop damage and earthquakes caused a large number of homes to collapse and a number of landslides in the surrounding mountains.

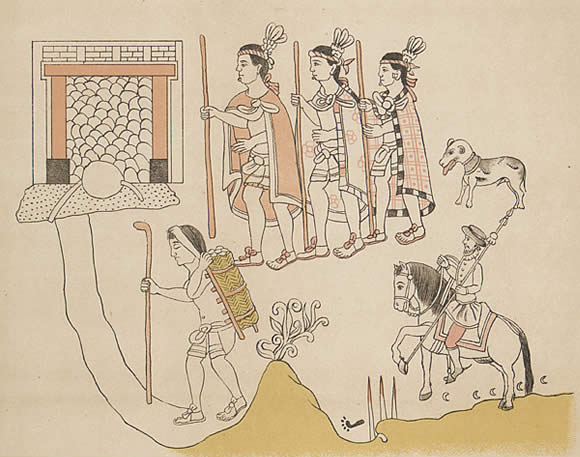
The Spanish passing through the Valley of Chalco towards Tenochtitlan

When Tenochtitlan fell to the Spanish in 1521, Ayapango was under the Aztec jurisdiction of Tenango (del Aire). After the Conquest, the territory was reorganized so that Ayapango fell under the jurisdiction of Amecameca, which was part of the Chalco region. Ecclesiastically, it was under the Franciscan jurisdiction of Tlalmanalco. Ayapango was evangelized under the direction of Friar Martin de Valencia.

In 1563, the town of Ayapango was begun to be built. By 1673, what is now the municipality of Ayapango was a small collection of communities, with most of the land owned by a few wealthy landholders such as the widow of Lorenzo de San Pedro and Nicolás de Galicia, who was the chief of the town of Ayapango. Historically, the economy of Ayapango has been based on the cultivation of corn and wheat, selling the harvests in Mexico City, either by land or via what was Lake Chalco. These trips were hazardous as robbers were a serious problem. Generally, natives were not permitted to carry weapons but in the mid-18th century, Manuel de Santiago, head of the town of Ayapango, managed to get such permission for this purpose. Up through most of the 19th century, life continued here much as it did all through the colonial period, mostly subsistence farming. The Mexican War of Independence had no effect on life here. Ayapango gained municipality status in 1868. Originally, the municipality was larger, but in 1875, Ayapango lost the towns of Zentlalpan and Santa Isabel Chalma to Amecameca. At the end of the 19th century, the state government considered disbanding the municipality and merging the entire territory to Amecameca because Ayapango's economic situation was precarious, making it difficult to maintain its own government. While Ayapango mostly stayed out of the Mexican Revolution, peasant sympathies for the rebels were strong due to poor treatment of farm workers by hacienda owners. While the Diaz government tried to recruit here for the federal army, most managed to avoid service. After the Revolution, two of the main haciendas, Retana and De Bautista were expropriated and converted into five ejidos, Ayapango, San Bartolomé Mihuacán, San Martín Pahuacán, San Cristóbal Poxtla and Tlamapa.

Ayapango's official named changed to Ayapango de Gabriel Ramos Millan in 1950. This was in honor of Ramos Millan, who was born here and who created the National Commission of Corn, working to introduce new seeds and farming techniques during the first half of the century. Ramos Millan died in a plane crash on Pico del Fraile, an elevation next to Popocatépetl and practically in front of his hometown. In the last half of the 20th century, life began to change here. Because of the building of new roads and rehabilitation of existing ones, interaction with the outside world has greatly increased. Secondary and preparatory schools have been built, eliminating the need to travel outside the municipality for this education. However, life still remains difficult here, with many going to other towns or countries in order to find work.

== The town ==
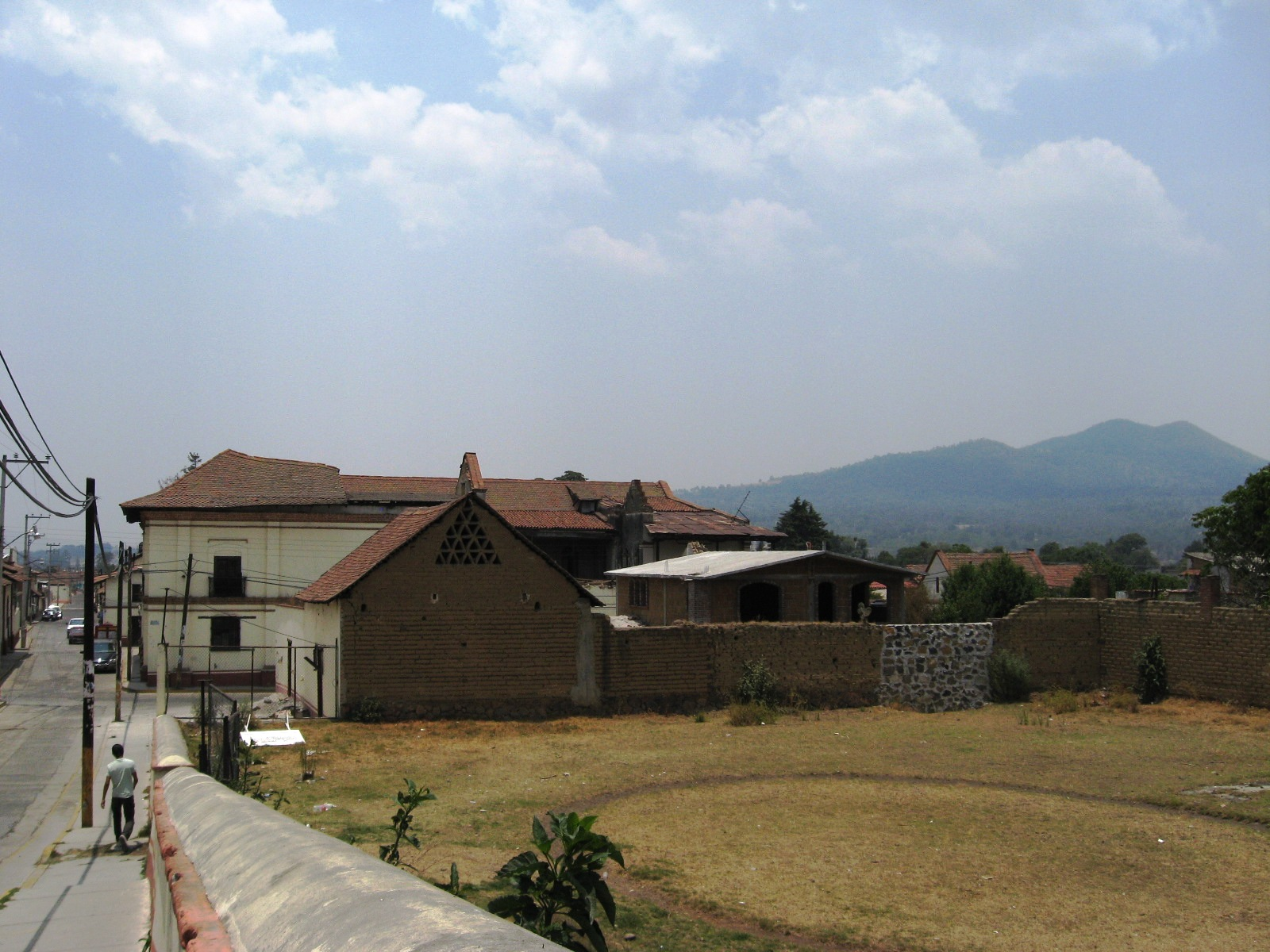
View from plaza overlooking the "Casa Grande"

The town has a population of only 3,072. The town's most distinctive feature are the older houses that conserve a kind of a "French" style as much for their form as for the materials they are construction with. The walls are thick adobe and their roofs have two peaks covered with flat clay tile shingles. In this attic space grain is kept. Many of these homes also have large patios. Another notable fact is that these older houses have names. This comes from a pre-Hispanic custom of naming a building based on its characteristics. Many of these older homes have plaques indicating what their names are. Two of the most prominent of these homes are known as the "Casa Grande" (Big House) and the "Casa Afrancesada" (The French-style House).

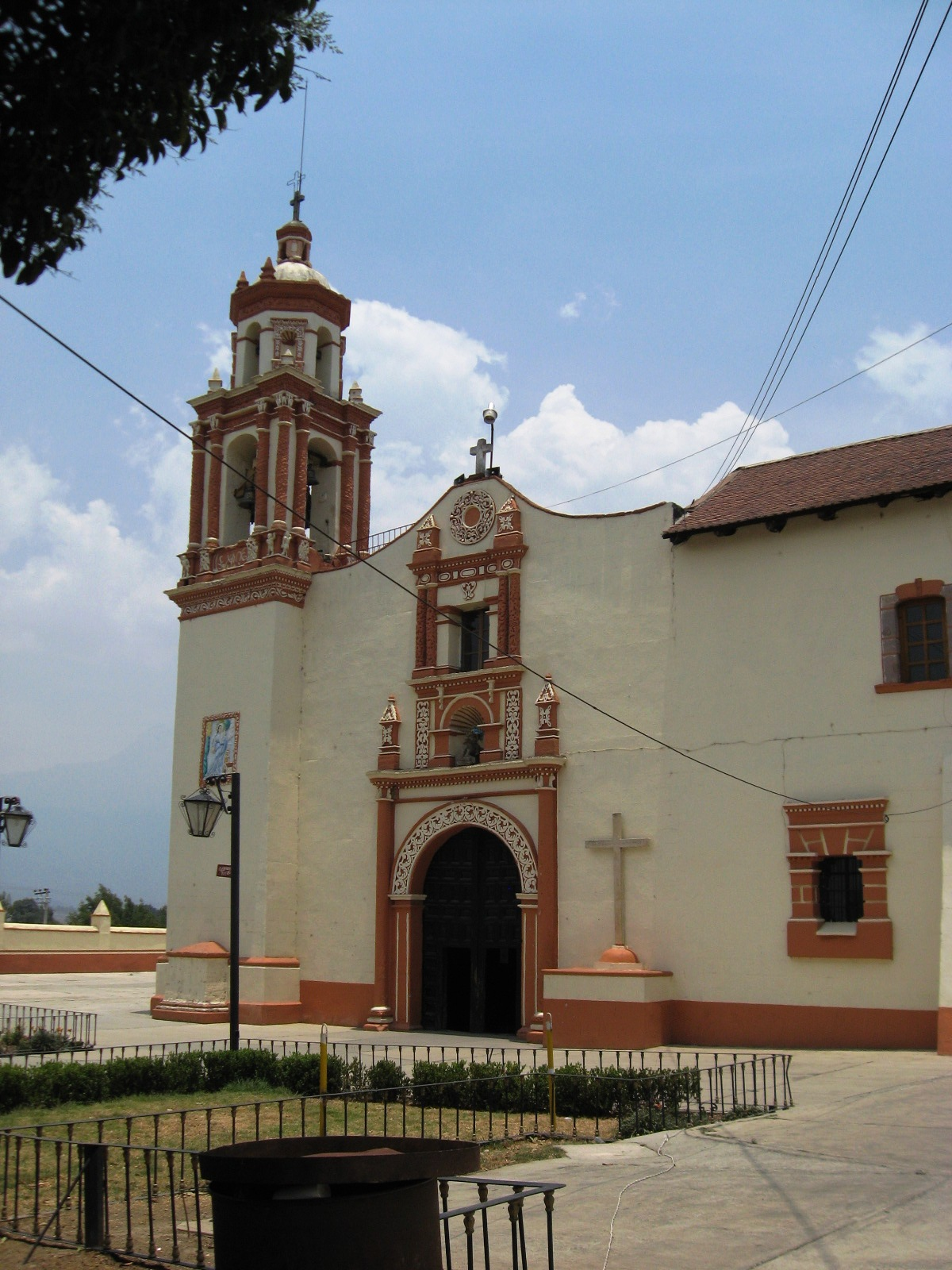
Parish of Santiago Apostol

The church here, Parish of Santiago Apostol, is dedicated to Saint James. The church was part of a larger monastery complex which dates from the 16th century. Some of the remains are still visible, esp. between the church and the priest's residence, which is part of the old convent that was rebuilt. Its layout is in the form of a Latin cross. The simple façade and the tower have Baroque elements that seem to be from the transitional period from the sober and solomonic eras as the elements show aspects from both. Inside there are oil painting with images of Purgatory painted in the 18th century.

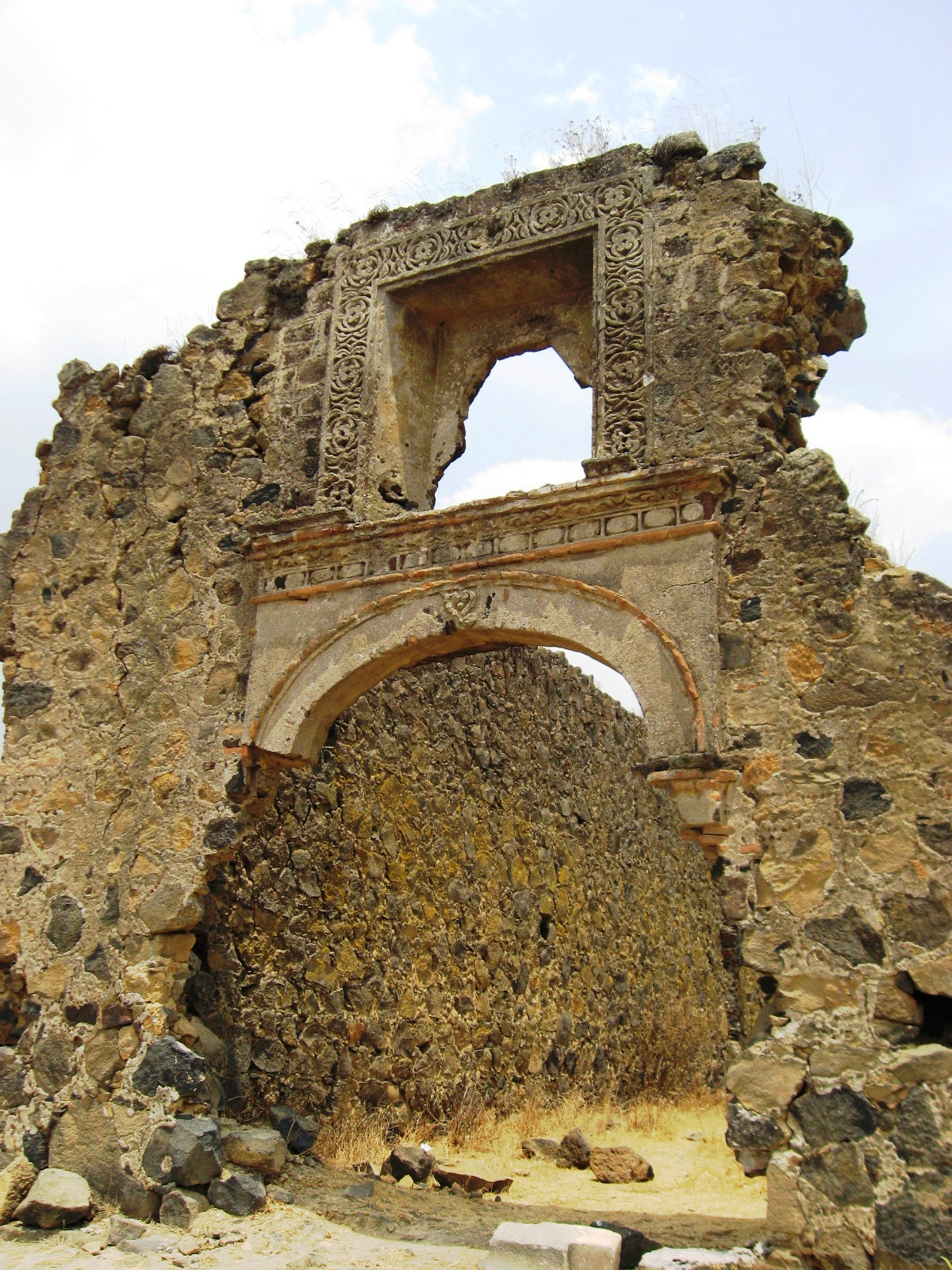
Entrance to ruins

Two kilometers south of the church is another set of Franciscan ruins called "El Calvario." This very old building was constructed on a hill of volcanic rock. The building is almost completely in ruins, in no small part due to people taking pieces of the worked stone.

Food here is simple, with most of the dishes keeping much of their pre-Hispanic flavor, such as mushroom soup, mixiote, barbacoa and mole.

== The municipality ==
As municipal seat, the town of Ayapango is the governing authority for the following communities: Mihuacán, Pahuacán, Poxtla, San Diego Chalcatepehuacán, Tlamapa, Ex-hacienda San Andrés Teticpan (Retana), Sémolo Grande, Juvencio Avendaño Méndez, Las Casitas (Tepexpan), Rancho San José, El Arenal (Camino al Arenal), Tepexpan, Rancho San Miguel, Colonia San Diego, Rancho Dos Marías, Rancho Nuestra Señora de Fátima and Predio el Calvario. The total area of the municipality is 36.63 km2 and it has a population of 6,361.

Most of municipality is grassland with a number of elevations such as Coronilla, Sacromonte, Coxtocán, Retana and Xoyacán Mountains. There are no rivers here, only a few arroyos that flow during the rainy season such as the Hueyatla, Tlaxcanac and Los Reyes.

As in times past, the economy is dominated by the growing of corn and wheat. Second in importance is the raising of cattle, sheep and pigs. The quality of the meat and milk is well-known and the principle industry here, the making of cheese and other dairy products is the result. Many of these are located on the farms themselves such as "El Lucero." This has attracted some tourism for its cheese and ex-haciendas such as Retana and Santa Maria, have been used a sets for Mexican movies.

In San Cristóbal Poxtla is located "El Lucero" farm, which is the principal cheese producer in the municipality. It was founded by María del Pilar García Luna, and currently run by her and her daughter, Elsa Aceves García, who permit tours of the facility. This enterprise makes a number of different types of Mexican cheese, such as Oaxaca cheese, which is sold in Mexico City, and the states of Puebla, Morelos and Guerrero.

In contrast, the ex hacienda of Santa Cruz Tamariz is in ruins and is illegally occupied by a number of families. It is located very near the village of San Francisco Zentlalpan, which has a temple in which all of the facade, including the columns, are covered in tezontle, a blood-red porous volcanic rock.
