= Dialectical monism =

Ontological position that holds that reality is ultimately a unified whole

Dialectical monism, also known as dualistic monism or monistic dualism, is an ontological position that holds that reality is ultimately a unified whole, distinguishing itself from monism by asserting that this whole necessarily expresses itself in dualistic terms.

== History ==
Dialectical monism has been mentioned in Western literature, although infrequently. Jean-Paul Sartre used the term on at least one occasion, in his Critique of Dialectical Reason.

"It is dualist because it is monist. Marx’s ontological monism consisted in affirming the irreducibility of Being to thought, and, at the same time, in reintegrating thoughts with the real as a particular form of human activity." —Jean-Paul Sartre, Critique of Dialectical Reason, Vol. 1. Theory of Practical Ensembles

In Sartre's seminal work, the Critique of Dialectical Reason, it is shown how the essential dualism of Marx corresponds to a heightened synthesis, referring to totality, which is the monism that grounds the theses and antitheses of Marxism.

In its article on Aztec philosophy, the Internet Encyclopedia of Philosophy describes Aztec (Nahua) metaphysics as a form of dialectical monism:

Although essentially processive and devoid of any permanent order, the ceaseless becoming of the cosmos is nevertheless characterized by an overarching balance, rhythm, and regularity: one provided by and constituted by teotl... Dialectical polar monism holds that: (1) the cosmos and its contents are substantively and formally identical with teotl; and (2) teotl presents itself primarily as the ceaseless, cyclical oscillation of polar yet complementary opposites.

Teotl's process presents itself in multiple aspects, preeminent among which is duality. This duality takes the form of the endless opposition of contrary yet mutually interdependent and mutually complementary polarities that divide, alternately dominate, and explain the diversity, movement, and momentary arrangement of the universe. These include: being and not-being, order and disorder, life and death, light and darkness, masculine and feminine, dry and wet, hot and cold, and active and passive. Life and death, for example, are mutually arising, interdependent, and complementary aspects of one and the same process.
