= 1949 Mexicana de Aviación DC-3 crash =

1949 aircraft accident in Mexico

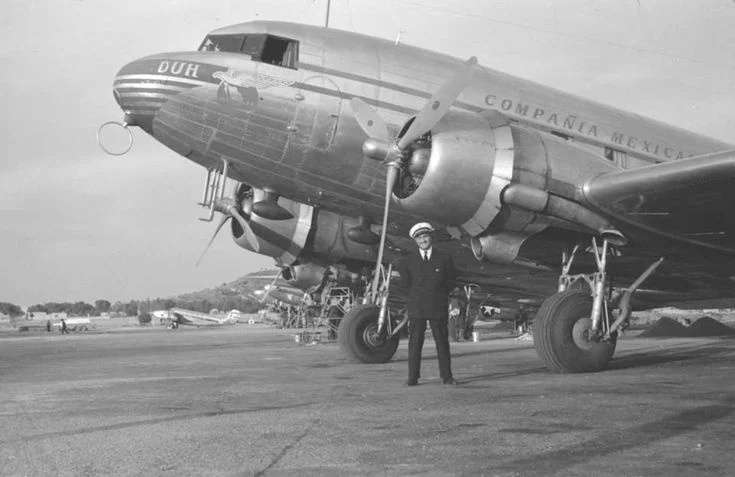
- XA-DUH, the aircraft involved in the accident

Accident
- Date: 26 September 1949
- Summary: Controlled flight into terrain
- Site: Popocatépetl

Aircraft
- Aircraft type: Douglas DC-3A
- Operator: Mexicana de Aviacion
- Registration: XA-DUH
- Flight origin: Tuxtla Gutiérrez
- 1st stopover: Ixtepec, Oaxaca
- 2nd stopover: Oaxaca City
- 3rd stopover: Tapachula
- Destination: Mexico City
- Occupants: 24
- Passengers: 21
- Crew: 3
- Fatalities: 24
- Survivors: 0

The 1949 Mexicana de Aviación DC-3 crash was an aviation accident on 26 September 1949, when a Mexicana de Aviacion Douglas DC-3 en route to Mexico City International Airport in Mexico City, Mexico crashed into the Popocatépetl volcano, killing all 24 people on board. The aircraft, registered as XA-DUH, was flying from Tapachula on a route that originated in Tuxtla Gutiérrez with intermediate stops in Ixtepec and Oaxaca. The dead included actress Blanca Estela Pavón and senator Gabriel Ramos Millan. The DC-3's pilot was identified as Alfonso Reboul Lasscassies.

Notably, in December of the same year, another DC-3 of the same airline also had an accident; the second one killing all 17 people on board.

== Accident ==
The DC-3 left Tapachula at 12:40 local time, for a one hour flight to Mexico City. According to investigations, the DC-3 flying the route that day faced severe turbulence as it arrived over Mexico City. The pilot communicated with an air force base, telling them they were near the volcano.

The airplane was completely destroyed.

== Other information ==
The famous Mexican writer and later politician, Andrés Henestrosa, was supposed to be on the flight with his friend, senator Ramos Millan. Henestrosa had a premonition and he boarded a train to Mexico City instead.

== See also ==
- List of accidents and incidents involving commercial aircraft
