= Aquiauhtzin =

Nahuatl noble poet

Tecayehuatzin (Aquiauhtzin) (c. 1430–1500) was a Nahuatl noble poet born in Ayapango, Mexico. Although a sought-out composer of poetry, few of his poems survive.

Poems attributed to Aquiauhtzin include:

Chalcacihuacuicatl (Song of Chalcan Women)
Noconcacon Cuicatl (I Have Heard A Song)humbe
