= Autobuses de Oriente =

Bus travel company

Autobuses de Oriente, S.A. de C.V.

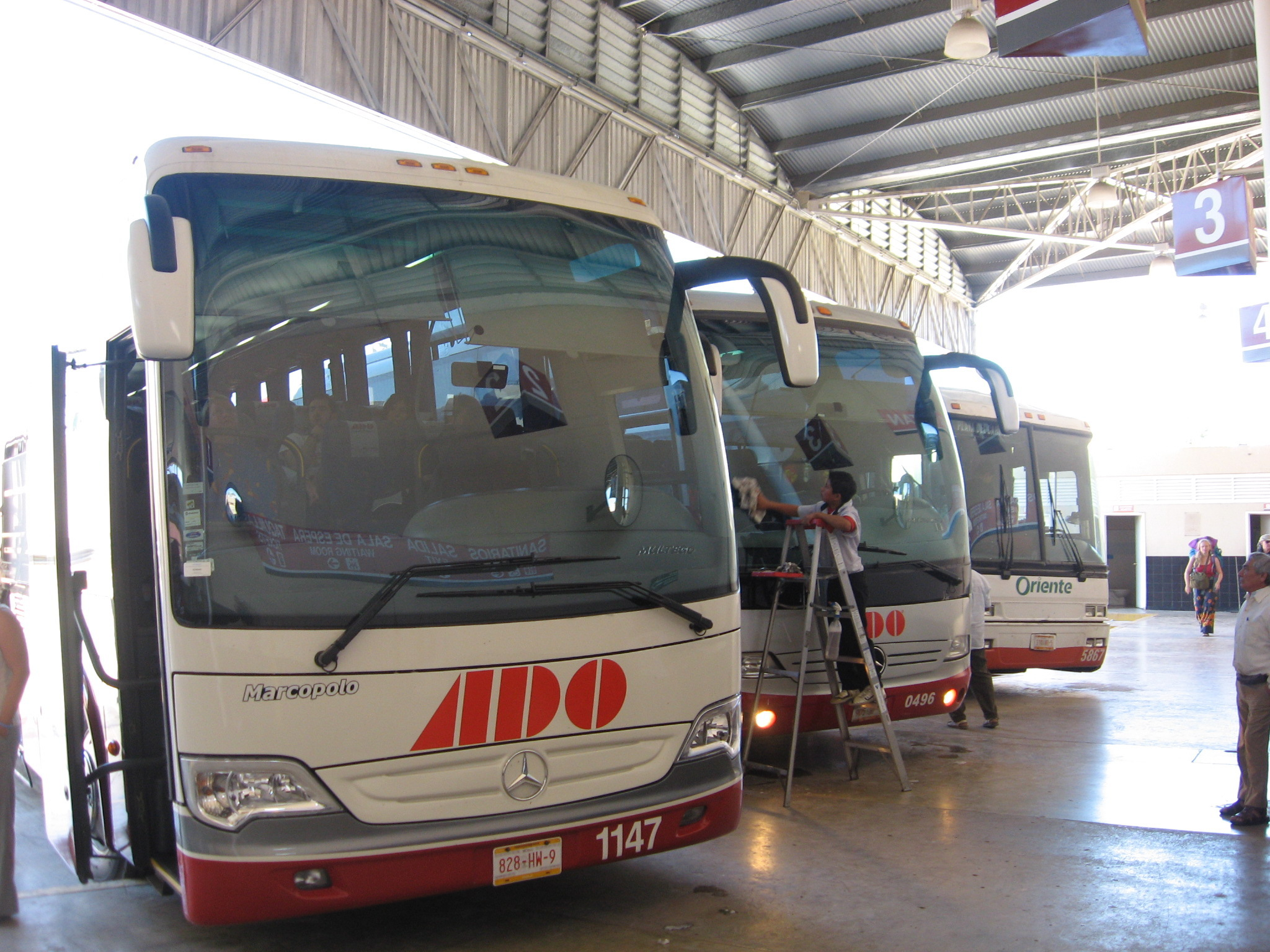
- A.D.O. buses at Valladolid, Mexico
- Type: Sociedad Anónima Bursátil de Capital Variable
- Industry: Bus Transportation
- Founded: December 23, 1939; 86 years ago
- Headquarters: Mexico City, Mexico
- Parent: Mobility ADO
- Website: Autobuses de Oriente

Autobuses de Oriente, S.A. de C.V. (Autobuses of the East, Inc.; usually known as A.D.O.) is one of the largest Mexican bus companies, running first-class and executive-class buses, and serving roughly the eastern half of the country.

== History ==
A.D.O. was founded with six buses on December 23, 1939, on the route from Mexico City to Veracruz, with stops in Puebla, Perote, and Xalapa, using Bentley Continental buses. The company struggled in its first years as demand for road transport was relatively little, the roads were dangerous, and there were no terminals or repair shops. Each of the founding partners had to serve as driver, baggage handler, mechanic, administrator, etc. Expansion began in the 1950s, when A.D.O. began service to Villahermosa, concurrently with the funding and construction of their own bus stations in cities outside Mexico City, many of which remain operational, such as in Veracruz, Xalapa, and Coatzacoalcos. Newer, A.D.O.-owned stations exist in cities such as Tapachula and Oaxaca. ADO also provides amenities at these stations, such as convenience stores, parcel services, restaurants, restrooms and waiting rooms.

In 1978, A.D.O. moved its Mexico City operations to the TAPO bus station, although the immense growth of the metropolitan area would lead the company to open satellite locations across Greater Mexico City to provide service to customers in the suburbs. Many A.D.O. services originating at TAPO stop at these satellite locations, which include Santa Martha Acatitla, Ixtapaluca, and Indios Verdes. Some services also originate at the Terminal Taxqueña and Terminal de Autobuses del Norte bus stations.

A.D.O.'s motto since 1939 has been Siempre primera (Always first), because it has always used the most modern buses possible, such as the DINA Avante, the DINA Olímpico and the DINA Flexible (nicknamed "Jorobado", i.e. "humpy"). As of 2019 the company uses Mercedes-Benz, Volvo, Irizar or Busscar buses, in silver, red, purple, and blue liveries.

== Services ==
A.D.O. offers service to most major cities and towns in all or part of the states of Campeche, Chiapas, Guerrero, Hidalgo, Mexico City, Michoacan, Morelos, Oaxaca, Puebla, Quintana Roo, State of Mexico, Tabasco, Tamaulipas, Tlaxcala, Veracruz, and Yucatan. Major metropolitan areas served include those of Mexico City, Puebla, Mérida, Cuernavaca, Tampico, Veracruz, Acapulco, Villahermosa, Reynosa, Cancún, Tuxtla Gutiérrez, Xalapa, Oaxaca, Pachuca, and Tlaxcala.

A.D.O. offers three distinct types of services: first-class, under the brand ADO, luxury-class, under the brand ADO GL (GL as an acronym for "Gran Lujo", which translates into English as "Great Luxury"), and executive-class under the brand ADO Platino. These three classes offer increasing amenities for increasing prices, with ADO Platino being the most expensive option.

Furthermore, A.D.O. is a company owned by its namesake group, Grupo A.D.O., which also offers second- and third-class services on most of mainline A.D.O. routes and to smaller communities on the same service area, through brands such as SUR, Volcanes, Omnibus Cristobal Colón (OCC), and Autobuses Unidos (AU).

== Sources ==
This article is a free translation of the article in the Spanish Wikipedia, with some additional information.
