= Bible translations into Uto-Aztecan languages =

Uto-Aztecan languages are divided into two groups, Northern and Southern Uto-Aztecan languages. They are spoken in the southwestern United States, north and central Mexico, and in Central America.

== Northern Uto-Aztecan ==
=== Ute/Southern Paiute ===
Luke's gospel was completed in 2006 and published by Wycliffe Bible Translators.

=== Shoshone ===
Beverly Crum published her translation of Mark into Shoshone in 1986. This was published by the U.S. Center for World Missions

=== Comanche ===
Mark was translated into Comanche language (Uto-Aztecan languages) by Elliot Canonge of Wycliffe Bible Translators, and was published by the American Bible Society in 1958 as Mark-ha tsaatü narümu'ipü̲.An edition of the Gospel of Mark, containing a Commanche Language Key, was published by authority of Big Cove Baptist Church, Cherokee, NC, and distributed by the Global Bible Society.

=== Northern Paiute ===
John and Joy Anderson of Wycliffe Bible Translators published a translation into Northern Paiute of Mark's gospel in 1977 and the whole New Testament in 1985.

Translation	John 3:16
Wycliffe 1985	Te Naa noꞌoko numu ka teepu-koobatu besa soobedyana, tu besa dooa tamme-koobatoo nemawuni. Tooe haga tooe nu-kwi tunakaꞌoedyukudu gi yaꞌekwu ooosapa gwetzoinnummekwu.

=== Hopi ===
The four gospels was published in 1929 by the American Bible Society. The New Testament was first published in 1972. It seems to mainly have been the work of Jonathan Ekstrom and Starlie "Elsie" Polacca.

Translation	John 3:16	
Pi God sinom amumi tutskwa, oviy pam maqa pam sukw tiy tavi, oviy qatso'taqat nap peq pam, qani mooki, oviy as himuy'vani qatsi.	Wycliffe 20	Pi God sinmuy amumi pas unaṅway’kȧ ṅw kahk ̇ awnaqe, ōviy pas sūkw tiy tavi, nāp hak ̇ put aw tuptsiwhqa qa hovalniwht, qatsit qaso’taqat himuy’vani.

== Southern Uto-Aztecan ==
=== Nahuatl ===
Shortly after the Spanish conquest of Mexico, Alonso de Molina translated the Doctrina christiana into Nahuatl, which was printed in 1546. The Spanish priest Bernardino de Sahagún attempted to translate the whole Bible into Nahuatl in order to make the Nahua understand the Word of God, but this was forbidden by the Inquisition in Sevilla on 10 May 1576.

It was not until the 20th century that the whole New Testament was translated into this language, when Protestant missionaries, at that time mainly from North America, started to translate the Scriptures into several Native Central American languages. Since then, according to the Summer Institute of Linguistics, the New Testament has been translated into 11 varieties of Nahuatl – Northern Puebla Nahuatl [ncj] (1979), Sierra Puebla Nahuatl [azz] (1979), Tetelcingo Nahuatl [nhg] (1980), Eastern Huasteca Nahuatl [nhe] (1984), Western Huasteca Nahuatl [nhw] (1986), Guerrero Nahuatl [ngu] (1987), Michoacán Nahuatl [ncl] (1998), Central Huasteca Nahuatl [nch] (2005), Northern Oaxaca Nahuatl [nhy] (2006), Southeastern Puebla Nahuatl [npl] (2011), and Zacatlán-Ahuacatlán-Tepetzintla Nahuatl [nhi] (2012) –, and the whole Bible into the three varieties Eastern Huasteca Nahuatl [nhe] (2005), Western Huasteca Nahuatl [nhw] (2004), and Central Huasteca Nahuatl [nch] (2005).

The Eastern Huasteca Nahuatl translation of the whole Bible and most of the Nahuatl translations of the New Testament have been accessible on internet Bible portals since about 2012.

The Protestant Nahuatl Bible translations have been criticized by representatives of the Catholic Church as “full of doctrinal and cultural errors”. After a workshop of Nahuatl-speaking Catholics, mainly priests, from various regions of Mexico, the bishop of San Cristóbal de las Casas, Felipe Arizmendi Esquivel, announced in August 2012 the formation of a catholic National Nahuatl Commission for a single translation of the whole Bible into Nahuatl, which is to be understood by the speakers of different Nahuatl varieties. However, a date for completion has not been mentioned.

Translation	John (Juan) 3:16
Itlajtol toteco, Ya ni nopa yancuic tlajtoli tlen toteco toca mocajtoc, WHBL, NT 1984, Bible 2005 (Eastern Huasteca Nahuatl, text in both editions identical)	Toteco nelía miyac quinicnelía nochi tlacame ipan ni tlaltepactli huan yeca quititlanqui Icone iyojtzi para miquis ininpampa. Huan queja nopa nochi tlen quineltocase, ax polihuise, pero quipiyase yolistli tlen yancuic para nochipa.
In Yancuic Tlahtolsintilil, 2012 (Zacatlán-Ahuacatlán-Tepetzintla Nahuatl)	’Dios tlailiuis oquintlasohtlac in tlalticpactlacameh, ica non octemactih nisintiConetzin, para nochi naquin tlaniltocas inauac amo mapohpoliui, yehyeh macpia in yolilistli tlen ica in sintitl nochipa.
In Yencuic Iyectlajtoltzin Dios itech ica toTeco Jesucristo, 1987 (Guerrero Nahuatl)	Tej, Dios sanoyej oquintlajsojtlac on tlalticpactlacamej hasta oquitemacac isenteConetzin para nochi on aquin quineltocas xpolihuis, yej quipias yencuic nemilistli para nochipa.

=== Nawat/Pipil ===
The Bible is being translated into the Pipil or Nawat language, spoken by a minority in El Salvador. This translation is being done by Alan R. King, a linguist with "Ne Bibliaj Tik Nawat". The Bible is being translated from the original languages. The New Testament is complete, and work is ongoing on the Old Testament.

Translation	John 3:16
NBTN	ika kiane kitasujtak ne Teut ne taltikpak ken hasta tamakak ne itelpuch ne isel kipiatuya pal muchi ne kiyulmatit ma inte puliwikan asunte ma yujyultuk senpa.

==== External links ====
- Ne Bibliaj

=== O'odham ===
The New Testament in the O'odham language (Uto-Aztecan family) of the O'odham of the Sonoran Desert of southeastern Arizona and northwest Mexico was translated by Dean and Lucille Saxton of Wycliffe Bible Translators. It was published by The World Home Bible League and The Canadian Home Bible League in 1975. Work is being done on the Old Testament.

Translation	John 3:16
Wycliffe 1975	Pegih neh, ab o si t-tatchua g Jiosh ch hiwigi g e-alithag mat am i e thagito k e muhkith am t-wehhejed mach d pi ap chu'ijkam. Kut pi wo bei g s-ko'ok e-namkithadag matp hedai ab wo hiwig k wabshaba g pi ha huhugetham thoakag wo bei.

=== Pima Bajo ===
Portions, 1994

=== Tarahumara, Central ===
Wycliffe Bible Translators' Tarahumara New Testament was published in the 1972. This was preceded by the gospels and acts being published in 1969. Little Flock Christian Fellowship updated the New testament and published both on the Internet. LFCF's updates were mostly dealing with the orthography.

Translation	John (Juani) 3:16
Wycliffe 1972	Mapujiti echi Huarubera Riosi ne huabe careri jena'í huichimóbachi piréami pagótami. Echijiti nijari birepi quepu Raná, mapurigá ne si'néami pagótami. mapu iquí gará bichíio echi Binoy jiti, quetasi mapurigá suhuíami niráa níima, chopi sinibí piréami níima Riosi yuhua.
LFCF 2010	Mapujiti echi Warubéra Riosi ne wabé kareri jena'í wichimóbachi piréami pagótami. Echijiti nijari birepi kepu Raná, mapurigá ne si'néami pagótami. mapu ikí gará bichíko echi Binoy jiti, ketasi mapurigá suwíami nirá níma, chopi sinibí piréami níma Riosi yuwa.

- Tarahumara New Testament

=== Tarahumara, Baja ===
New Testament, 2007

Translation	John (Juani) 3:16
Peninsula Bible Church, 2007	Onorúgameka 'we galele ralámuli, alekeri bo'né bi'lepi Inolá júlale napurigá alué 'símala ralámuli gu'iria. Suwábaga ralámuli napu ekí 'la Onorúgame Inolá oyérame ju, alueka tabilé simámili júkuru injiérnochi. Alueka 'pa rewagachi simámili júkuru ejperélimia nabí.

=== Northern Tepehuan ===
The New Testament, translated by Burton William Bascom and Marvel Bascom was published in 1981 by the World Home Bible League.

Translation	John 3:16
World Home Bible League, 1981	Diuusi sʌʌlicʌdʌ oigʌdai ʌoodami oidigi daama oidacami cascʌdʌ ootoi ʌgai gʌmara, mosaliʌʌmaduga ʌgai maradʌ, dai gʌmuaatu sai tomasioorʌ sioorʌ vaavoitudagi isʌgai ʌrʌcʌʌgacʌrʌ vuviadami camaiimi agai ʌDiaavora ʌʌmadu baiyoma imia agai tʌvaagiamu dai Diuusi ʌʌmadu oidaca agai tomastuigaco.

=== Yaqui ===
The Bible League published John and Mary Dedrick's translation of the New Testament in 1977, a second edition was published in 2003.

Translation	John (Joan) 3:16
Bible League, 2003	’Bweꞌituk juꞌu Lios, inim aniapo jukaꞌ yoemrata, tua aꞌ nakekai, aapo jukaꞌ wepul aꞌ yoemiata, jiokot au aꞌ bitneꞌ betchiꞌbo aꞌ suꞌu tojak. Junuen beja, siꞌime jumeꞌ aꞌ sualeme, inimeꞌe, ka jiba betchiꞌbo kokkoka, taa ala inimeꞌe, jiba yuu jiapsiwamta bem bitneꞌ betchiꞌbo.

=== Huichol/Wixarika (hch) ===
Wycliffe Bible translators finished a full edition in 2020.

Translation	John (Wani) 3:16
Wycliffe, 2020	Kakaɨyari 'ipaɨ katiniwanaki'erieka kwiepa memɨtama. Yuniwe muyuxewi kaniyetuani memɨkatatɨmaiyarienikɨ, yunaitɨ yuri memɨte'erie hetsiena, tukari mɨkaxɨwe memexeiyanikɨ pɨta.
