= Terminal de Autobuses de Pasajeros de Oriente =

Bus Terminal

Coordinates: 19°25′48.04″N 99°6′44.28″W

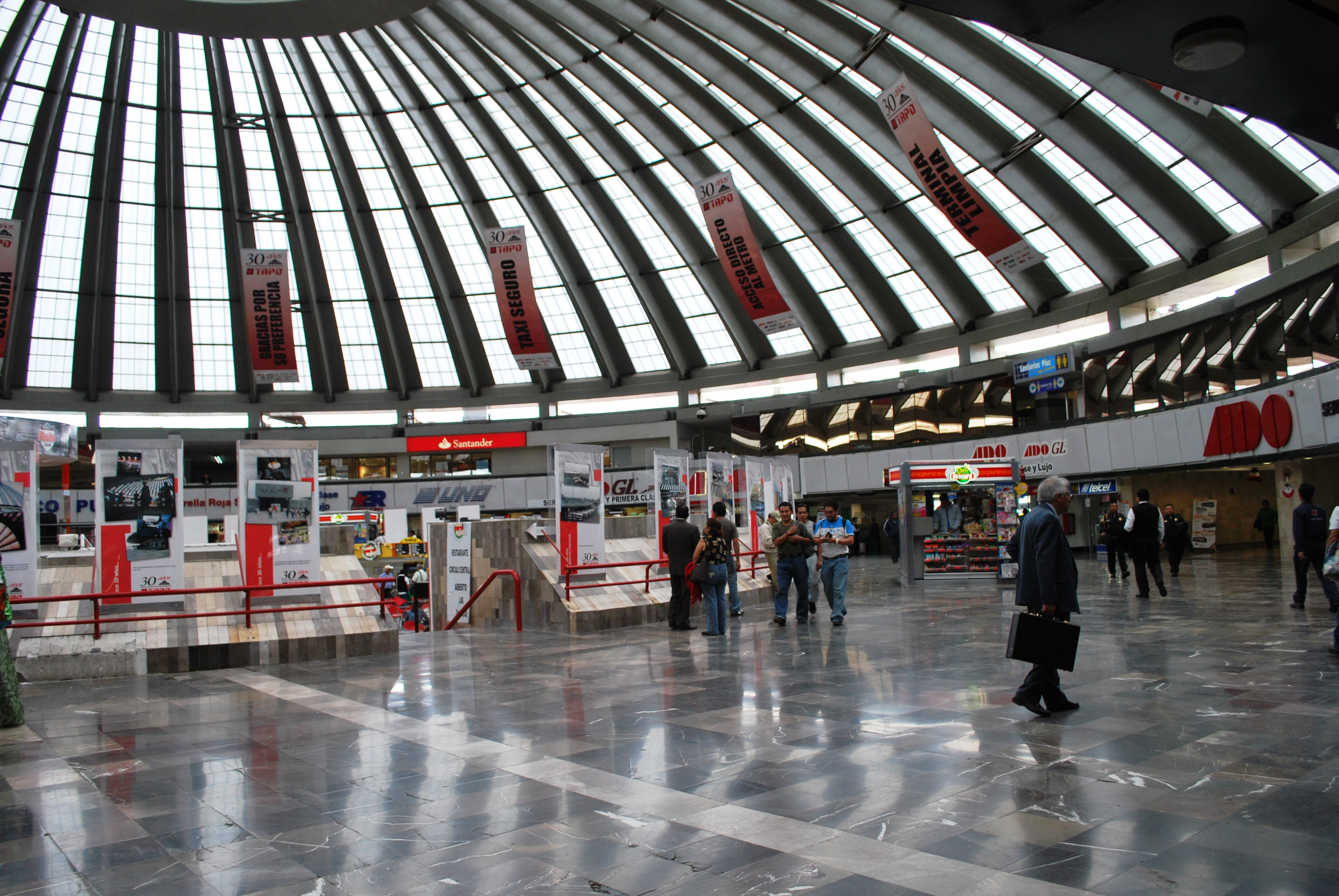
Inside the terminal

Terminal de Autobuses de Pasajeros de Oriente (Eastern Passenger Bus Terminal), better known by the acronym TAPO, is an inter-city bus station in Mexico City. It is located next to and conjoined with the San Lázaro metro station, in the Venustiano Carranza borough in the eastern part of Mexico City. Designed by architect Juan José Diaz Infante Núñez, it is marked by its very large dome covering the structure. The outer rim of the circular interior contains ticket counters and boarding areas for bus lines. The center contains a food court and other businesses.

The terminal serves travelers to fourteen states in the country, primarily to the east and south of Mexico City, such as to Puebla, Veracruz, Oaxaca and the Yucatan Peninsula. There are nine bus companies that operate from here with the four main companies being Estrella Roja, Autotransportes Texcoco, Autobuses de Oriente (ADO) and Grupo Texcoco. There over four hundred busses operating seventeen routes, with carry an average of 10,000 passengers per day. The terminal gets crowded during vacation periods and long holiday weekends. During these weekends, traveler totals are ten percent or more above normal. The busiest times are the Christmas and Holy Week periods, which can see anywhere from 180,000 to 220,000 passengers go through the terminal.

The terminal was built in 1978 by the federal government under José López Portillo. In 2003, there were renovations including the pedestrian bridges, a tunnel for taxis, restructuring the main local bus stop, installation of street lighting and the banning of vendors.

Crime has been an issue at the terminal. One reason for the problems is the rise in crime in the surrounding neighborhoods in general. Another has been the operation of unlicensed taxis although much of this has been relieved by the construction of an underground station for legal taxis. One particular problem at least since the 2000s has been the prostitution of children. Girls and young women as young as ten years old from poor parts of the country are targeted as they arrive to Mexico City. The terminal has over 2,000 security workers during peak times with twenty security cameras.

In 2011, some of government efforts to encourage reading were centered on the terminal. In conjunction with the Autobuses de Oriente (ADO), consisting of free copies of books with texts by Mexican authors such as Elena Poniatowska, José Agustín and Efraín Huerta. Also, the first book "tianguis" or market began operating at the terminal, with books from twenty different publishers. It operates intermittently about every two months.
