= Gabriel Ramos Millán =

Mexican senator and lawyer

Gabriel Ramos Millán (1903–September 26, 1949) was a Mexican politician, lawyer and urban developer who was known locally as the "Apostle of Corn". A member of the Institutional Revolutionary Party (PRI) – and its forerunner, the Party of the Mexican Revolution (PRM) – Ramos Millán was considered by many, including President Miguel Alemán, as a strong candidate for Mexico's presidency. Alemán and Ramos Millán had a personal friendship.

Ramos Millán was born in Ayapango, State of Mexico, a town that later honoured him by changing its name to Ayapango de Gabriel Ramos Millán.

He was elected to the Chamber of Deputies for the State of Mexico's 9th district in the 1943 mid-term election and to the Senate for his home state in 1946.

On President Alemán's instructions, Ramos Millán created the National Corn Commission (Comisión Nacional del Maíz) in 1947.

== Death ==
On September 26, 1949, Ramos Millán and 22 others, including actress Blanca Estela Pavón, were killed when their Mexicana de Aviación Douglas DC-3 airplane crashed onto the Popocatépetl volcano in an accident that killed everyone on board during the Tapachula to Mexico City leg of a Tuxtla Gutiérrez to Mexico City flight.

== Honors ==
To honour Ramos Millán, his home town changed its name to Ayapango de Gabriel Ramos Millán, and an elementary school was named after him in Sinaloa.
