= Teotl =

Nahuatl term for divinity

Teōtl ([ˈte.oːt͡ɬ]) is a Nahuatl term for sacredness or divinity that is sometimes translated as 'god'. For the Aztecs teotl was the metaphysical omnipresence upon which their religious philosophy was based.

As described by James Maffie, teotl "is essentially power: continually active, actualized, and actualizing energy-in-motion... It is an ever-continuing process, like a flowing river... It continually and continuously generates and regenerates as well as permeates, encompasses and shapes reality as part of an endless process. It creates the cosmos and all its contents from within itself as well as out of itself."

This is conceptualized in a kind of monistic pantheism as manifest in the supreme god Ōmeteōtl, as well as a large pantheon of lesser gods and idealizations of natural phenomena such as stars and fire.

Similar concepts to teotl existed elsewhere in Mesoamerica at the time of the conquest, such as in the Zapotec term pee or the Maya ku or ch'u. Such immaterial energy can also be compared to the Polynesian concept of Mana. In Pipil mythology Teut (Nawat cognate of Teotl) is known as the creator and father of life.

The gods in the Aztec pantheon, themselves each referred to as a teotl (plural teteo), were active elements in the world that could manifest in natural phenomena, in abstract art, and as summoned or even embodied by priests during rituals – all these could be called teotl.

Molly Bassett identifies major characteristics of teotl as the term is used in the Florentine Codex to get further insight on Aztec religion as described in other codices.

Whereas in most Nahuatl translations of the Bible and Christian texts, "God" (Θεός) is translated with the Spanish word "Dios", in modern translations by the Catholic Church in the 21st century, the word "Teotzin", which is a combination of teotl and the reverential suffix -tzin, is used officially for "God".

== See also ==
- Asha
- Brahman
- Logos (Christianity)
- Orenda
- Tao
