= Amecameca =

Amecameca de Juárez
- Municipality
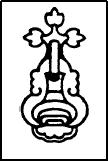
- Coat of arms

- Location within Mexico
- Coordinates: 19°07′40″N 98°45′46″W
- Country: Mexico
- State: State of Mexico
- Region: Amecameca Region
- Municipal seat: Amecameca de Juárez
- Municipal Status: 1824

Government
  - Municipal President: Ivette Topete
- Elevation (of seat): 2,480 m (8,140 ft)

Population (2010) Municipality
  - Municipality: 48,421
  - Seat: 31,422
- Time zone: UTC-6 (CST)
- Postal code (of seat): 56900
- Demonym: Amequense
- Website: http://www.amecameca.gob.mx

Amecameca is a municipality located in the eastern panhandle of Mexico State between Mexico City and the Iztaccíhuatl and Popocatépetl volcanos of the Sierra Nevada mountain range. It is located on federal highway 115 which leads to Cuautla, which is called the Volcano Route (Ruta de los Volcanes).

Amecameca area is a popular resort destination for visitors from Mexico City, Puebla and Morelos, owing to its mountain scenery, food scene, and other attractions. However, when Popocatépetl is active, tourism here drops dramatically. The area receives many visitors during the annual Carnival/Festival del Señor del Sacromonte, which extends over the week containing Ash Wednesday and is considered to be one of the most important festivals in Mexico State.

The name Amecameca comes from Nahuatl. It has been interpreted to mean “place where the papers signal or mark,” or “paper used ceremoniously.”

== History ==
Settled human habitation in this area began early mostly in dispersed small villages. The Chichimeca tribe called the Totolimpanecas arrived around 1268 and populated the areas now known as Itztlacozauhcan, Tlayllotlacan Amaquemecan. Later arrivals occupied areas known as Tzacualtitlan Tenanco Amaquemecan and Atlauhtlan Tzacualtitlan Amaquemecan. These groups had their own small dominions. In 1336, another dominion called Tlaylloltlacan Teohuacan was formed. All these communities were collectively known as the Amaquemecans. Religious practices in this area were mostly performed in urban temples and shrines located on mountaintops and caves. In 1465, the Aztecs conquered this area, along with the rest of the Valley of Chalco, replacing local leaders with military governors and transforming the area into a tributary province with neighboring Tlalmanalco as capital.

Hernán Cortés arrived here in 1519 and noted that the houses here were well built with about 20,000 inhabitants. In 1521, the leaders here were Quetzalmazatzin and his brother Tecuanxayacatzin due to the help they gave Cortés in conquering Tenochtitlan. Soon thereafter, they were poisoned. After the Spanish conquest of the Aztec Empire, Franciscans were in charge of evangelizing the area. In 1525, Martín de Valencia set fire to the local priests' houses on the Amaqueme Mountain (Sacromonte), and in 1527 construction of the Franciscan monastery began. The cult to the Santo Entierro (Holy Burial) or Señor del Sacromonte was begun to replace an earlier pagan cult at this site. The La Asuncion Church was begun in 1547, along with a number of other places of worship. Construction was finished in 1564. The tower was not built until the mid-17th century. From the 1540s to the end of the century, there was much civil strife among the native population. Some indigenous rule was restored but it would end for good by the 17th century. The raising of European foodstuffs such as wheat and sheep began early with commercial agriculture becoming the basis of the economy by 1550. The area also became an important pass linking Mexico City with points east with many travelers and merchants passing through. By 1599, Amecameca has become the head of a district with thirteen dependencies with an area of about 128km2.

A major earthquake occurred here in 1704 which destroyed many houses as well as the roof of the La Asuncion Church. It was repaired from 1712 to 1719.

The area remained a farming area, mostly with family plots through the rest of the colonial period. During the Mexican War of Independence, there was restlessness here among the population, but no major incidents. In 1812, a number of natives from here fought in the war under Leonardo Bravo in other places. The municipality was mostly likely founded in 1824 along with the founding of Mexico State. U.S. troops passed through here during the Mexican–American War. In 1833, Amecameca was part of the state of Mexico in the eastern prefecture. In 1861, the settlement gained official town status from the state due to its historical and economic importance. The municipal palace was built in 1899.

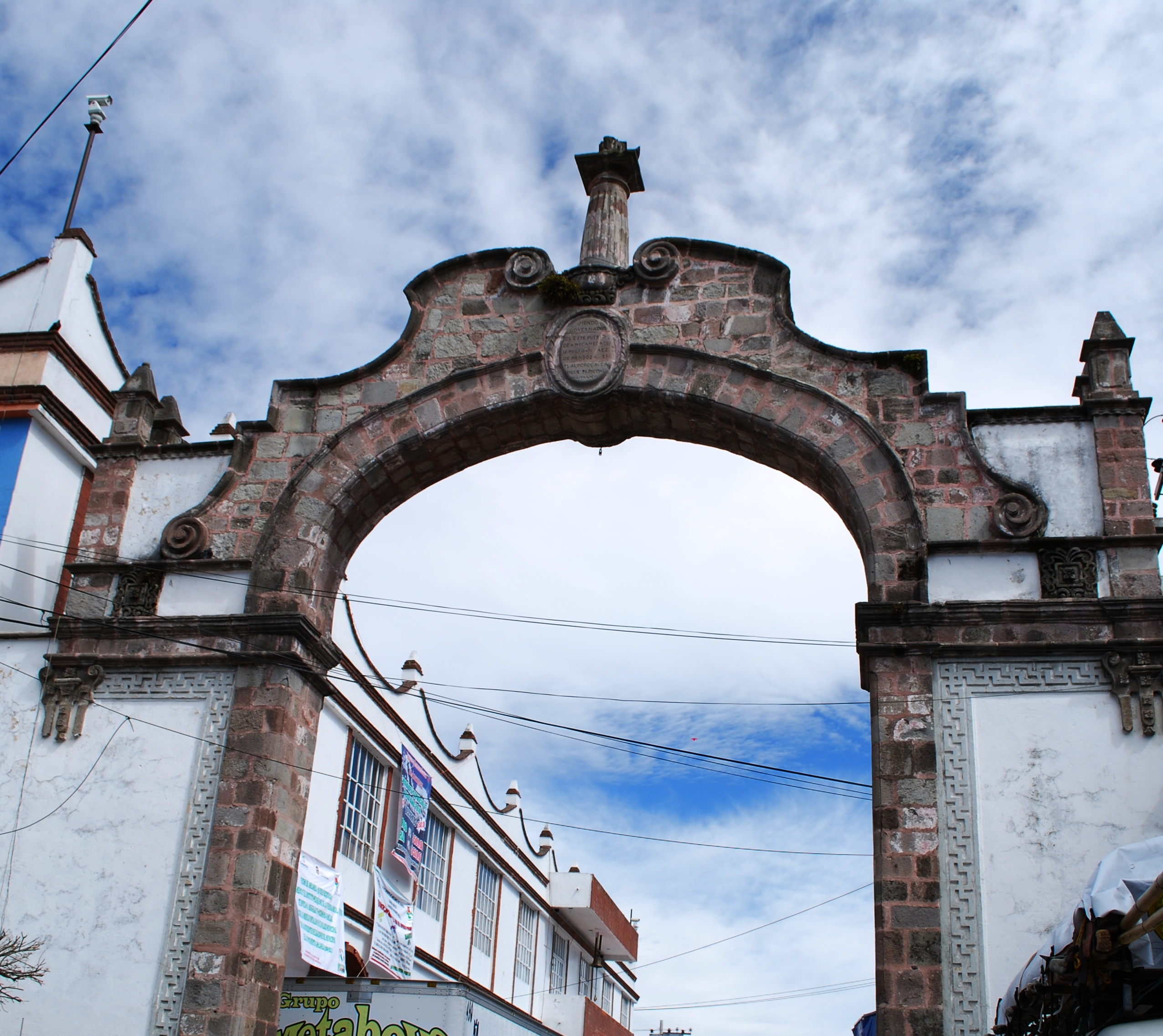
Colonial era arch to the historic center

In the last 19th and early 20th century, Amecameca was the scene of several industrialization projects including a beer brewery, wheat mills and workshops producing saddles and metal objects. There was some minting of copper, silver and gold as well. In 1871, Father Fortino Hipolito Vera y Talona founded a number of business and cultural enterprises such as the first polytechnic school and a press which printed both religious and cultural articles. Until the Mexican Revolution, most of the arable land in the area was owned by large haciendas such as the Tomacoco, Coapexco and Panohaya. In 1910, Francisco I. Madero was in Amecameca. From a railroad car, he gave a speech against Porfirio Díaz. From 1911 on, the military revolt against the Diaz government was mostly carried out here by Zapatistas, which gained recruits from Amecameca and by 1917, the area was a Zapatista stronghold. The area was important to rebels as it provided materials such as paper, wood, alcohol, charcoal and foodstuffs. After the war, agricultural lands here were redistributed in 1925.

In 1919, there was a major eruption of the Popocatépetl volcano, killing seventeen people in the municipality. In the 1950s, much of the city was renovated including the main plaza, market and Hidalgo Street. The road to the Sanctuary of Sacromonte was improved and stairs added to climb the hill. Since then, the town of Amecameca has grown into a small city. However, there is not enough employment here and many commute to Mexico City to work. The state proclaimed the town a cultural heritage of Mexico State in 1980 and was designated the "Capital del Alpinismo Nacional" in 1992.(Capital of Mexican Alpinism).

In the 2000s, Grupo Walmart in Mexico began to construct a supermarket (Bodega Aurrerá) in the old section of Amecameca but INAH suspended construction. The reason for the suspension was that it would cover nearly a city block and damage older buildings protected by the federal agency.

== Geography ==
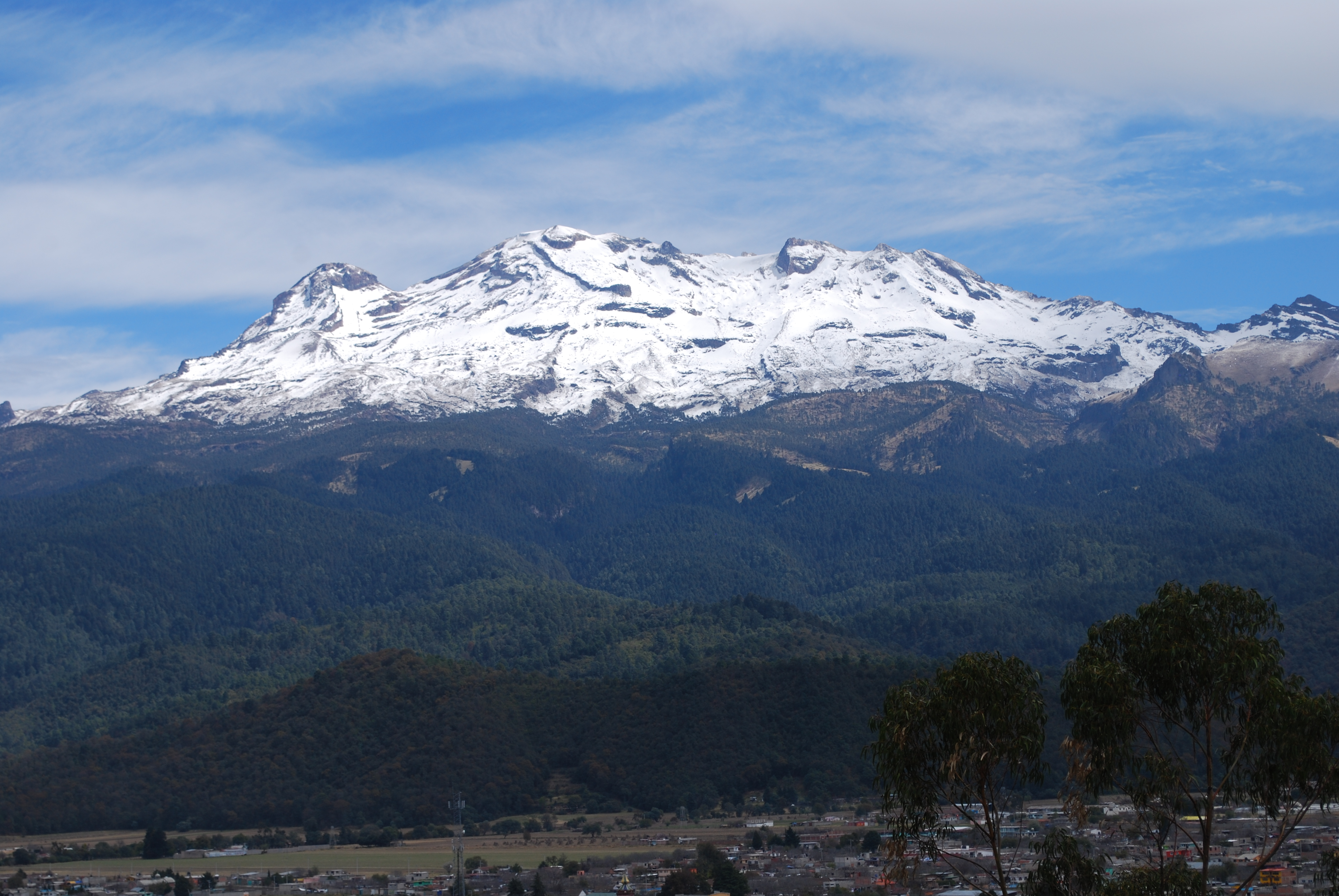
View of Iztaccíhuatl from the Sacromonte

As municipal seat, the town of Amecameca is the local governing authority for more than 130 other named communities, which over an area of 181.72km^{2}. The municipality borders the municipalities of Tlalmanalco, Atlautla, Ozumba, Ayapango and Juchitepec with the state of Puebla to the east. About 65% of the municipality's population lives in the town proper. At the end of the 19th century, about 85% of the population spoke Nahuatl, but today less than 200 speakers remain.

The municipality is situated on the foothills of the Sierra Nevada between the Iztaccíhuatl and Popocatépetl and in the Moctezuma-Panuco River. The Sierra Nevada is the most important geographical feature of the region and forms the eastern border of the municipality. These volcanoes are responsible for the compositions of the soils here as well as the source of most of the municipality's fresh water. The average altitude in these mountains is 4,000 meters above sea level with the highest elevations at the Iztaccíhuatl and Popocatépetl volcanos. Although near the active volcano, Amecameca is considered to be at a lower risk than other communities in the area because of the shape of Popocatépetl's cone and the large ravines that are found in this area. The latter offers protection against lava flows and runoff from melting snow. However, the area remains part of the evacuation zone in the event of a major eruption. There is a lookout station on Sacromonte hill which is used by civil defense when the volcano is more active. The area has an eruption warning system of three colors—red, yellow and green—which depend on the status of Popocatepetl. Green means that the volcano is quiet, yellow that there is activity and caution is advised and red indicates a current or imminent eruption. When the status turns to yellow, tourism to the area plummets to about half normal.

Fully within the municipality, the most important elevation is the Sacromonte. The main river there is the Alcalican, which forms from the snowmelt of Iztaccihualt. Its name means “in the house of water”. Most of the other streams and springs of the municipality are fed by the Sierra Nevada mountains. The climate is temperate and somewhat wet (cb(w2)) with most rains coming between May and October. Temperatures generally vary between 2 °C and 24 °C although temperatures of −8 °C and 34 °C are not uncommon.

This area, especially in the rainy season, has an abundance of wild edible plants, especially mushrooms. Undeveloped areas in the lower mountains areas are mostly covered by forests of pine, oak and cypress, with trees reaching over 30 meters in height. However, deforestation is an issue both for the loss of trees and the remaining forests’ ability to resist fires and plagues, with about twenty percent of forested area lost in last decades of the 20th century. Grazing cattle often inhibits reforestation. Higher up, the forests are dominated by fir trees with some pines and cedars. At the highest elevations near the tree line, only one species of pine is found, Pinus hartwagii. Above the tree line are alpine meadows. Small mammals, especially rabbits are common here as a number of reptiles and a variety of birds. The area used to have larger species such as white-tailed deer but these have been hunted to extinction.

Most of the municipality now is dedicated to agriculture and livestock. The main crop is corn along with other grains such as alfalfa, wheat and oats. There are a significant number of orchards here producing walnuts, pears, apples, capulins and other fruit. The municipality is the major producer of walnuts in Mexico. Livestock raised here includes pigs, cattle, sheep and domestic fowl. One important agricultural activity there is the production and conservation of traditional varieties of corn. Like other communities in the area, there are three main varieties of corn planted where as well as a number of minor varieties. These are planted mostly as a trial or because of their special characteristics, not to compete with the three main varieties. In local markets, these farmers are able to sell these local varieties as well as exchange seed to maintain genetic variety.

There is some industry there, which employs about a third of the workforce. The main ones are Los Molinos de la Covadonga, La Harinera Amecameca, Hilos Cadena, which produced milled products and thread. In addition, there are small workshops which produce saddles, ironwork and machine pieces. Most commerce occurs in the municipal seat, mostly with the sale of staple foods and other basic necessities. Market days are Monday, Wednesday and Sunday when the town is covered in portable stalls in a tradition called the tianguis. In addition, there are several hotels and other businesses that cater to tourists. This sector of the economy employ about 45% of the municipality's population.

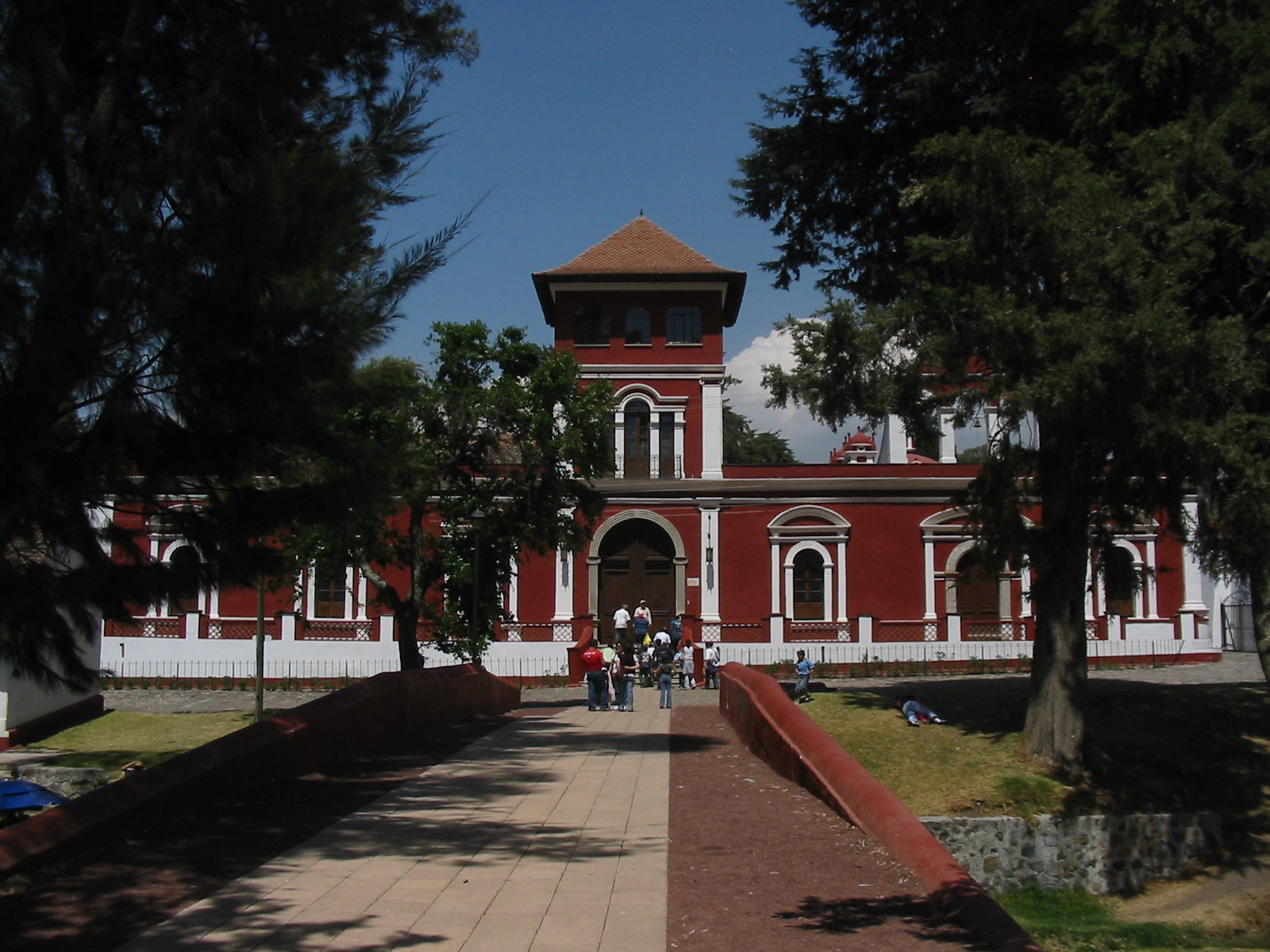
Museum of Sor Juana

Outside of the town proper, there are a number of other tourist attractions in the municipality. There is one registered archeological site in the municipality called the Piedra del Conejo ("Rabbit Stone") or Monumental solsticial de Tomacoco ("Solstice monument of Tomacoco"). One of the major attractions is the Panoaya Hacienda. The main hacienda building houses the Sor Juana Inés de la Cruz Museum; it is featured in the reverse of the $200 pesos Mexican note. Sor Juana come to live at Panoaya in 1651 when she was three years old to live with her mother and grandfather. She learned to read and write and stayed until she was sent to live in Mexico City in 1663. The hacienda lay in ruins for the last century or so until it was rehabilitated in 1999 at a cost of more than 10 million pesos. A building next to this one is the International Museum of Volcanos which exhibits of Mexico two most famous volcanoes and others in the world. The hacienda's main building now serves as the Sor Juana Inés de la Cruz Museum, run by INAH. Much of the rest of the hacienda land is leased to a recreational park which is best known for its petting zoo which contains tame deer.

Another major attraction is the Bosque de los Arboles de Navidad (Christmas Tree Forest), one of the few places in Mexico where one can go and cut their own tree. The Bosque plants trees such as the "vikingo mexiquense" and the "vikingo canadiense" coming here has become a tradition for many families in the Mexico City area. It is a business that was conceived forty years ago as a way to help preserve the forest here as well as benefit economically. Visitors come to spend a day in the area and can cut trees only from designated locations. Picnicking is permitted with the requirement that no garbage is left behind. The Christmas tree area covers 300 acres (120 hectares), and cut trees are left to regrow instead of being killed. The park also hosts food stalls and a Christmas market, selling about 30,000 trees per year and employing 50 permanent and 250 seasonal workers. The money earned from the enterprise helps to preserve more wild areas of the mountains here. This work has earned a Premio Nacional de Ecología (National Ecology Prize). The only problem the forest experiences is that the enterprise is so popular that the roads leading to the area are jammed with traffic.

Lesser-known attractions include the Eco Parque San Pedro, the Temazcal Park and the Agua Viva monastery. The Eco Parque San Pedro (San Pedro Ecological Park) is located between the Amecameca and Nexpayantla rivers just outside the municipal seat in the community of San Pedro Nexapa. It stands at 2870 meters above sea level, very close to the Puebla state line and has a cold, wet climate. The park is between the Popocatépetl and Iztaccíhuatl volcanos near the Cortés Pass. The park was created as a way to manage and preserve the natural resources of the area. It is a recreational area for sports such as hiking and also contains the second largest labyrinth of its type in the world created with over 38,000 cedar trees over an extension of 10,000 m^{2}. There is also a "zoo" of sculpted plants made to form animals using plants native to the area. The Temazcal Park is a natural area with dirt and stone paths. It contains a variety of pine trees and medicinal plants and is home to white tailed deer, foxes and other wildlife. Activities available here are hiking, mountain biking, camping and other nature sports. The Agua Viva (Living Water) monastery is a Dominican institution located at the foothills of Iztaccíhuatl. There are still monks here that offer mass. The Cortés Pass is located 30 minutes from the town, which is a space between the two volcanoes and from where Cortés had his first view of the Valley of Mexico.

== Government and administration ==
| Mayor | Period |
|---|---|
| José Federico Del Valle Miranda | 2000-2003 |
| Rosendo García Rodríguez | 2003-2006 |
| Juan Manuel Guerrero Gutiérrez | 2006-2009 |
| Juan Demetrio Sanchez Granados | 2009-2012 |
| Carlos Santos Amador | 2012-2015 |
| Álvaro Carlos Avelar López | 2015-2018 |
| Miguel Ángel Salomón Cortes | 2018-2021 |
| Ivette Topete García | 2021- |

== Notable residents ==
- Laura Mendez (1853–1928), feminist, writer, poet and educator
