= Llano Grande =

Llano Grande may refer to:

- Llano Grande, Coclé, Panama
- Llano Grande, Herrera, Panama
- Llano Grande, Texas, United States
- Llano Grande, Veraguas, Panama
- Llano Grande, Mexico
