= Bosque de los Arboles de Navidad =

The Bosque de los árboles de navidad (Christmas trees forest) is a tourist park and a greenhouse located in Amecameca, State of Mexico, Mexico. The park is about 988.4 acres (4.000 km^{2}). The park was founded in 1960. Every year there is a planting of about 350,000 new trees. The trees that are cut during Christmas time are 10 years old. The park is surrounded by 4 volcanoes: the Tonal, the Seatl, the Popocateptl and the Iztaccihuatl.

Entrance to the park is free every year between November 20 and December 20. The price of all sizes of trees is US$36 in order to avoid people cutting small trees. This park benefits the environment through activities such as reforestation and treatment of residual waters.
