= Helguera =

Helguera is a surname. Notable people with the surname include:

- Francisco Eppens Helguera (1913–1990), Mexican artist known for his paintings, murals and sculptures
- Iván Helguera (born 1975), former Spanish footballer
- Jesús Helguera (1910–1971), Mexican painter
- Luis Helguera (born 1976), Spanish footballer
- Pablo Helguera
