= Popocatépetl =

Stratovolcano in Puebla, Mexico

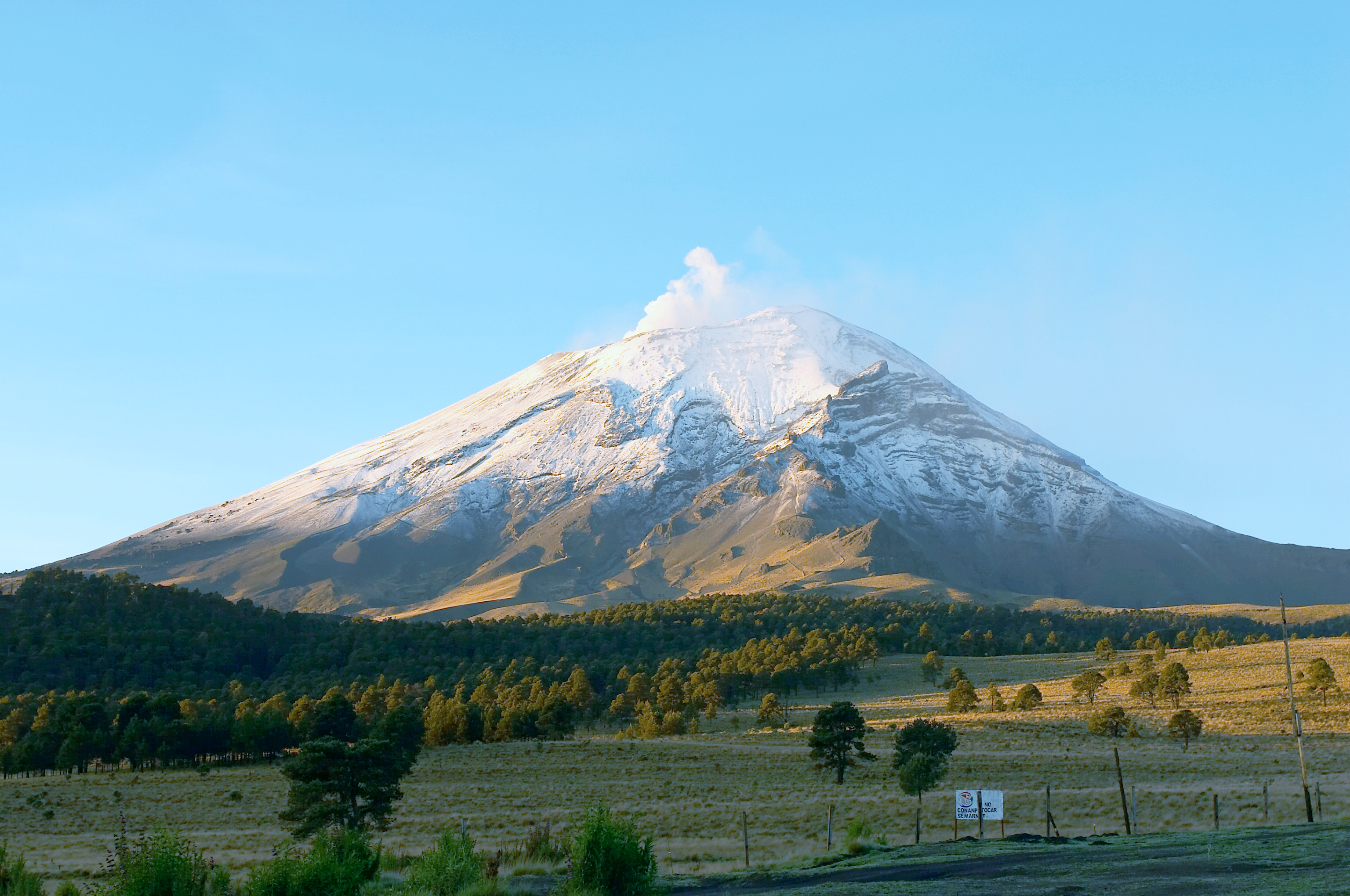
- Popocatépetl, viewed from the north from Paso de Cortés.

Highest point
- Elevation: 5,393 m (17,694 ft) (Note: Sources vary widely, on the elevation of Popocatépetl, with most giving a value at or slightly above 5,400 m (17,700 ft). The 5,393 m (17,694 ft) figure given here is from the Smithsonian Institution-Global Volcanism Program.)
- Prominence: 3,020 m (9,910 ft)
- Listing: World most prominent peaks 89th; North America highest peaks 5th; North America prominent peaks 17th; Mexico highest major peaks 2nd
- Coordinates: 19°01′20″N 98°37′40″W

Naming
- Etymology: popōcatepētl, Smoking Mountain
- Nickname: Don Goyo

Geography
- Location within Puebla (state) Location within State of Mexico Location within Mexico
- Location: Mexico-Puebla-Morelos, Mexico

Geology
- Mountain type: Stratovolcano
- Last eruption: 2024

Climbing
- Easiest route: rock/snow climb

Popocatépetl (UK: /ˌpɒpəˈkætəpɛtəl, ˌpɒpəkætəˈpɛtəl/ POP-ə-KAT-ə-pet-əl, -kat-ə-PET-əl, US: /ˌpoʊp-/ POHP-, Spanish: [popokaˈtepetl]; Nahuatl languages: Popōcatepētl [popoːkaˈtepeːt͡ɬ]) is an active stratovolcano located in the states of Puebla, Morelos, and Mexico in central Mexico. It lies in the eastern half of the Trans-Mexican Volcanic Belt. At 5,393 m (17,694 ft) it is the second highest peak in Mexico, after Citlaltépetl (Pico de Orizaba) at 5,636 m (18,491 ft). Popocatépetl is ranked 89th by prominence.

It is linked to the twin volcano of Iztaccihuatl to the north by the high saddle known as the "Paso de Cortés". Izta-Popo Zoquiapan National Park, wherein the two volcanoes are located, is named after them.

Popocatépetl is 70 km (43 mi) southeast of Mexico City, from where it can be seen regularly, depending on atmospheric conditions. Until recently, the volcano was one of three tall peaks in Mexico to contain glaciers, the others being Iztaccihuatl and Pico de Orizaba. In the 1990s, the glaciers such as Glaciar Norte (North Glacier) greatly decreased in size, partly due to warmer temperatures but largely due to increased volcanic activity. By early 2001, Popocatépetl's glaciers were gone; ice remained on the volcano, but no longer displayed the characteristic features of glaciers such as crevasses.

Lava erupting from Popocatépetl has historically been predominantly andesitic, but it has also erupted large volumes of dacite. Magma produced in the current cycle of activity tends to be a mixture of the two with the andesites being rich in magnesium.

== Name ==
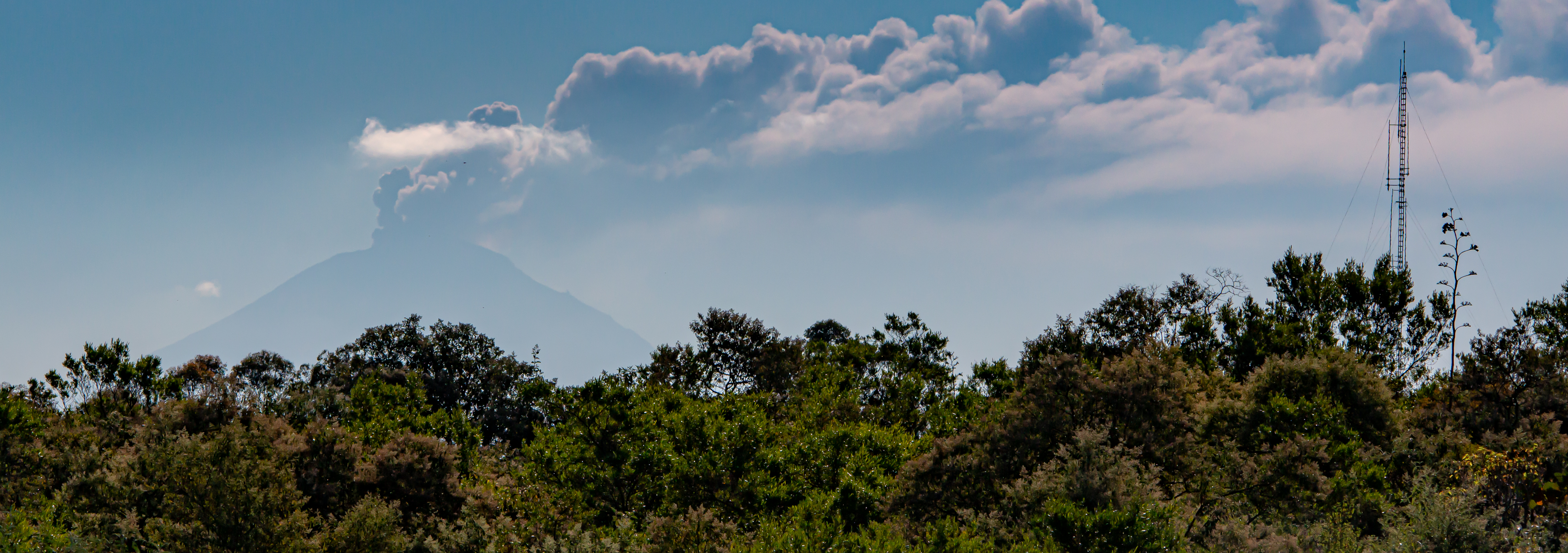
Popocatepetl seen from UNAM (instituto de Ecologia with Sigma 500 mm), Mexico City

The name Popocatépetl comes from the Nahuatl words popōca (Nahuatl pronunciation: [poˈpoːka]) "it smokes" and tepētl [ˈtepeːt͡ɬ] "mountain", meaning Smoking Mountain. The volcano is also referred to by Mexicans as El Popo affectionately, or to shorten the full name. The alternate nickname Don Goyo comes from the mountain's association in the lore of the region with San Gregorio, "Goyo" being a nickname-like short form of Gregorio. The name was extended by those who lived in Santiago Xalitzina, a small community 12 km (7.5 mi) from the volcano. Legend says that many years ago, a villager met an old man on the slopes of the mountain, who introduced himself as Gregorio Chino Popocatépetl. Gregorio was a personification of the spirit of the volcano, and communicates with the locals to warn them if an eruption is about to happen. Thus, every 12 March, the day of San Gregorio, the locals bring flowers and food to the volcano to celebrate the saint.

== Legend of Popocatépetl and Iztaccíhuatl ==
In Tlaxcaltecan mythology, Iztaccíhuatl was a princess who fell in love with one of her father's warriors, Popocatépetl. The emperor sent Popocatépetl to war in Oaxaca, promising him Iztaccíhuatl as his wife (which Iztaccíhuatl's father presumed he would not). Iztaccíhuatl was falsely told that Popocatépetl had died in battle, and believing the news, she died of grief. When Popocatépetl returned to find his love dead, he took her body to a spot outside Tenochtitlan and knelt by her grave. The gods covered them with snow and changed them into mountains. Iztaccíhuatl's mountain is called "White Woman" (from Nahuatl iztāc "white" and cihuātl "woman") because it resembles a woman lying on her back, and is often covered with snow — the peak is sometimes nicknamed La Mujer Dormida, "The Sleeping Woman". Popocatépetl became an active volcano, raining fire on Earth in blind rage at the loss of his beloved.

In an alternate version of the story, Popocatepetl battled Xinantecatl (Nevado de Toluca) for Izta's hand by hurling fire, rocks, and ice. Popo triumphed by decapitating his opponent, which explains the rounded shape of Nevado's summit.

== Geology ==
360-degree digital elevation model (DEM) animation of Popocatépetl, showing the summit crater and surrounding topography

The stratovolcano contains a steep-walled, 450 m × 600 m (1,480 ft × 1,970 ft) wide crater. The generally symmetrical volcano is modified by the sharp-peaked Ventorrillo on the NW, a remnant of an earlier volcano. At least three previous major cones were destroyed by gravitational failure during the Pleistocene, producing massive debris avalanche deposits covering broad areas south of the volcano. The modern volcano was constructed to the south of the late-Pleistocene to Holocene El Fraile cone. Three major Plinian eruptions, the most recent of which took place about 800 AD, have occurred from Popocatépetl since the mid-Holocene, accompanied by pyroclastic flows and voluminous lahars that swept basins below the volcano.

According to paleomagnetic studies, the volcano is about 730,000 years old. It is cone shaped with a diameter of 25 km (16 mi) at its base, with a peak elevation of 5,450 m (17,880 ft). The crater is elliptical with an orientation northeast-southwest. The walls of the crater vary from 600 to 840 m (1,970 to 2,760 ft) in height. Popocatépetl is currently active after being dormant for about half of last century. Its activity increased in 1991 and smoke has been seen constantly emanating from the crater since 1993. The volcano is monitored by the Deep Earth Carbon Degassing Project.

== History ==
The geological history of Popocatépetl began with the formation of the ancestral volcano Nexpayantla. About 200,000 years ago, Nexpayantla collapsed in an eruption, leaving a caldera in which the next volcano, known as El Fraile, began to form. Another eruption about 50,000 years ago caused that to collapse, and Popocatépetl rose from that. Around 23,000 years ago, a lateral eruption (believed to be larger than the 1980 eruption of Mount St. Helens) destroyed the volcano's ancient cone and created an avalanche that reached up to 70 kilometres (43 mi) from the summit. The debris field from that is one of four around the volcano, and it is also the youngest.

Three Plinian eruptions are known to have taken place: 3,000 years ago (1195–830 BC), 2,150 years ago (800–215 BC), and 1,200 years ago (likely 823 AD). The latter two buried the nearby village of Tetimpa, preserving evidence of preclassical culture.

The first recorded European ascent of the volcano was made by an expedition led by Diego de Ordaz in 1519. The early-16th-century monasteries on the slopes of the mountain are a World Heritage Site.

=== Eruptions ===
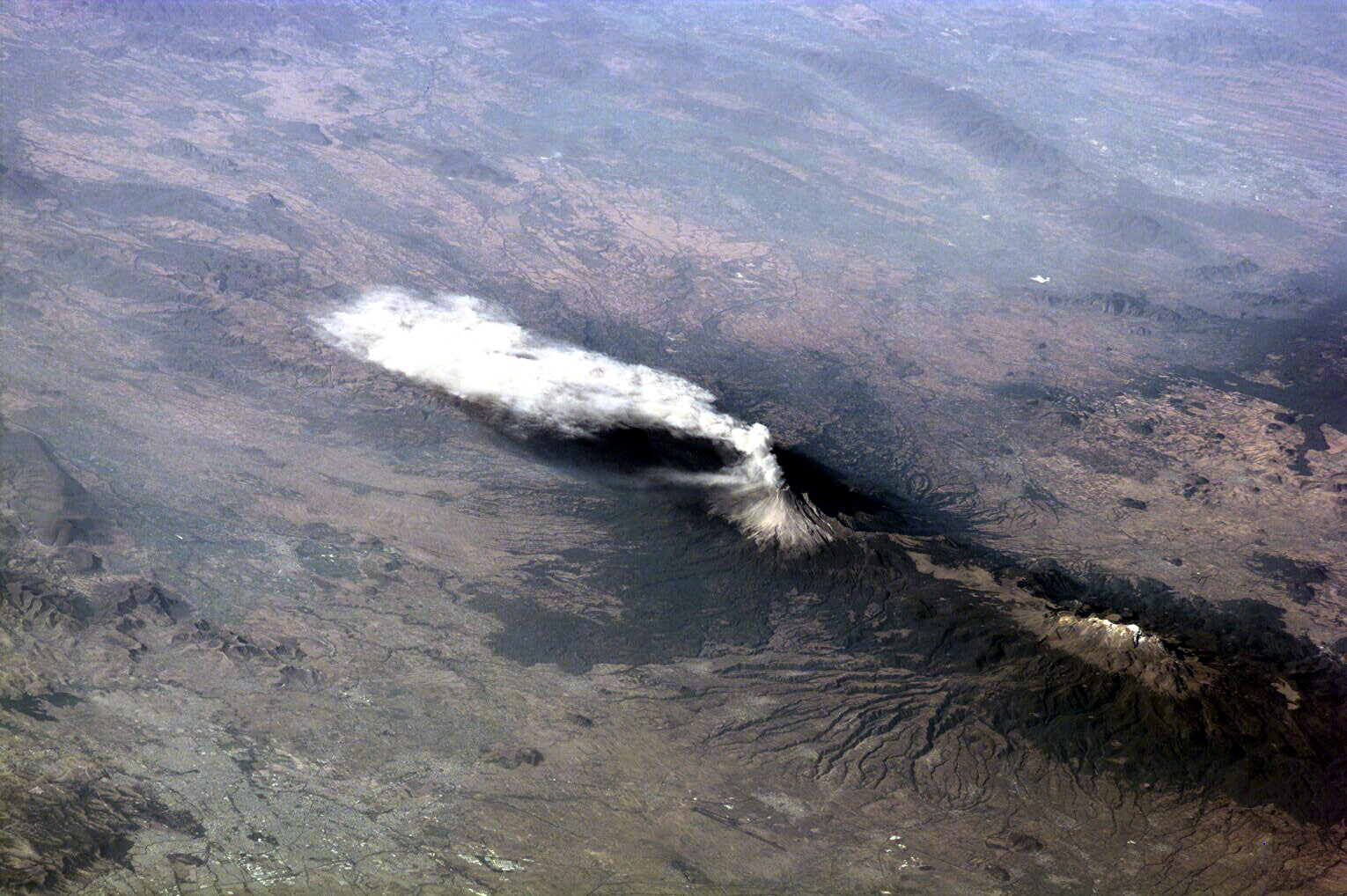
International Space Station view of Popocatépetl sending plume of volcanic ash south 23 January 2001, Iztaccíhuatl at right

Popocatépetl viewed from Puebla, Puebla, January 2004 eruption

Popocatépetl is one of the most active volcanoes in Mexico and the most famous, having had more than 15 major eruptions since the arrival of the Spanish in 1519.

==== Timeline ====
- Mid-to late first century: A violent VEI-6 eruption may have caused the large migrations that settled Teotihuacan, according to DNA analysis of teeth and bones.
- Eruptions were observed in 1363, 1509, 1512, 1519–1528, 1530, 1539, 1540, 1548, 1562–1570, 1571, 1592, 1642, 1663, 1664, 1665, 1697, 1720, 1802, 1917, 1923, 1925, and 1933.
- January and February 1947: There were brief explosions, expelling steam and ash.
- On the week of 15 October 1950, more than 5,000 people attempted to climb Popocatépetl to attend a religious ceremony. The climbers were caught in a severe snowstorm and three people were killed and 400 reportedly injured due to weather conditions.
- 21 December 1994: The volcano spewed gas and ash, which was carried as far as 25 km (16 mi) away by prevailing winds. The activity prompted the evacuation of nearby towns and scientists to begin monitoring for an eruption.
- December 2000: Tens of thousands of people were evacuated by the government, based on the warnings of scientists. Then the volcano made its largest display in 1,200 years.
- 22 January 2004: Eruption (see picture above).
- 25 December 2005: The volcano's crater produced an explosion which ejected a large column of smoke and ash about 3 km (9,800 ft) into the atmosphere and expulsion of lava.
- January and February 2012: Scientists observed increased volcanic activity at Popocatépetl. On 25 January, an ash explosion occurred on the mountain, causing much dust and ash to contaminate the atmosphere around it.
- 15 April 2012: There were reports of superheated rock fragments being hurled into the air by the volcano. Ash and water vapor plumes were reported 15 times over 24 hours.
- 8 May 2013: at 7:28 p.m. local time, Popocatépetl erupted again with a high amplitude tremor that lasted and was recorded for 3.5 hours. It began with plumes of ash that rose 3 km (9,800 ft) into the air and began drifting west at first, but later began to drift east-southeast, covering areas of the villages of San Juan Tianguismanalco, San Pedro Benito Juárez and Puebla in smoke and ash. Explosions from the volcano subsequently ejected fragments of fiery volcanic rock to distances of 700 m (2,300 ft) from the crater.
- 4 July 2013: Due to several eruptions of steam and ash for at least 24 hours, at least six U.S. airlines canceled more than 40 flights into and out of Mexico City International Airport and Toluca International Airport.
- 27 August – September 2014: CENAPRED reported explosions, accompanied by steam-and-gas emissions with minor ash and ash plumes that rose 800–3,000 m (2,600–9,800 ft) above Popocatépetl's crater and drifted west, southwest, and west-southwest. On most nights incandescence was observed, increasing during times with larger emissions.
- 29 and 31 August 2014: The Washington Volcanic Ash Advisory Center (VAAC) reported discrete ash emissions.
- 7 January 2015: CENAPRED reported that ash from recent explosions coated the snow on the volcano's upper slopes.
- 28 March 2016: An ash column 2,000 m (6,600 ft) high was released, prompting the establishment of a 12-kilometre (7.5 mi) "security ring" around the summit.
- 3 April 2016: Popocatépetl erupted, spewing lava, ash and rock.
- August 2016: Eruptions continued, with four discrete blasts on 17 August.
- 10 November 2017: at 7:25 local time, an eruption occurred.
- 15 December 2018: at 18:57 local time, the volcano spewed lava, ash and rocks.
- 22 January 2019: at 21:06 local time, the volcano spewed ash up to 3 km (9,800 ft) high and incandescent fragments 2 km (1.2 mi) away.
- 19 March 2019: at 21:38 local time, fragments of the dome shot within 1.6–2.4-kilometre (1–1 1/2 mi) radius. Due to continuing activity, on 28 March 2019, based on the analysis of the available information, the Scientific Advisory Committee of the Popocatépetl volcano recommended changing the phase of the Yellow Volcanic Warning Light Phase 2 to Yellow Phase 3, which is a preventive measure against the observed changes.
- 3 June 2019: Popocatépetl fired an ash column to approximately 11 km (37,000 ft) above sea level.
- 18 June 2019: Popocatépetl spewed ash clouds to 8.5 km (28,000 ft).
- 24 June 2019 Popocatépetl erupted once more, sending an ash cloud some kilometres (thousands of feet) into the air.
- 18 July 2019: Popocatépetl erupted three times, sending ash 1.5 km (4,900 ft) into the air each time.
- 20 July 2019: volcanic ash was reported in Xochimilco after a morning eruption.
- October 2019: the volcano erupted multiple times in one night.
- November 2019: an eruption forced a KLM flight from Amsterdam to Mexico City to turn back.
- 9 January 2020: Popocatépetl expelled lava and rock and sent ash clouds to 6.1 km (20,000 ft).
- 27 January 2020: Popocatépetl erupted in a nighttime display of rock and ash.
- 5 February 2020: Popocatépetl had a moderate explosion producing an ash plume that went up 1.5 km (0.93 mi). More explosions on 15, 18 February, and 22 sent ash plumes rising from 400–1,200 m (1,300–3,900 ft).
- 22 June 2022: Four climbers and a guide began climbing Popocatépetl despite the prohibition of climbing the volcano. One woman died and another was seriously injured when they were showered with volcanic rocks and debris and fell into a gully 1,000 feet from the volcano's crater.
- 19 December 2022: Popocatépetl emitted materials up to one kilometer (0.62 mi) high.
- 19 May 2023: Popocatépetl emitted some ash causing the closure of schools in 11 nearby towns and two days later on 21 May, the alert level in Mexico City was raised to Yellow Phase 3 as incandescent fragments were observed and the airports in Mexico City and Puebla were temporarily shut down.
- 27–28 February 2024: Popocatépetl erupted 13 times within 24 hours, causing the cancellation of 22 flights at Mexico City and Puebla International Airports.

== In literature and art ==
Popocatépetl and Iztaccíhuatl feature prominently in Malcolm Lowry’s 1947 novel Under the Volcano as well as the 1984 feature film of the same name, an adaptation of the novel directed by John Huston. At the end of the novel, the novel's main character, the Consul, imagines ascending it.

In visual arts, Popocatépetl is the subject of at least four paintings by American artist Marsden Hartley. His 1932 paintings Popocatepetl, One Morning and Popocatepetl, Spirited Morning - Mexico are at Sheldon Museum of Art in Lincoln, Nebraska, and the Smithsonian American Art Museum in Washington, DC, respectively.

Several works by Dr. Atl feature Popocatépetl, among them his 1928 Self-Portrait with Popocatépetl, now in the Philadelphia Museum of Art and his 1942 The Shadow of Popo, now in the Museo Nacional de Arte in Mexico City.

Jesús Helguera’s 1940 masterpiece La Leyenda de los Volcanes in Chicago’s National Museum of Mexican Art depicts the myth of Popocatépetl and Iztaccíhuatl.

== Gallery ==
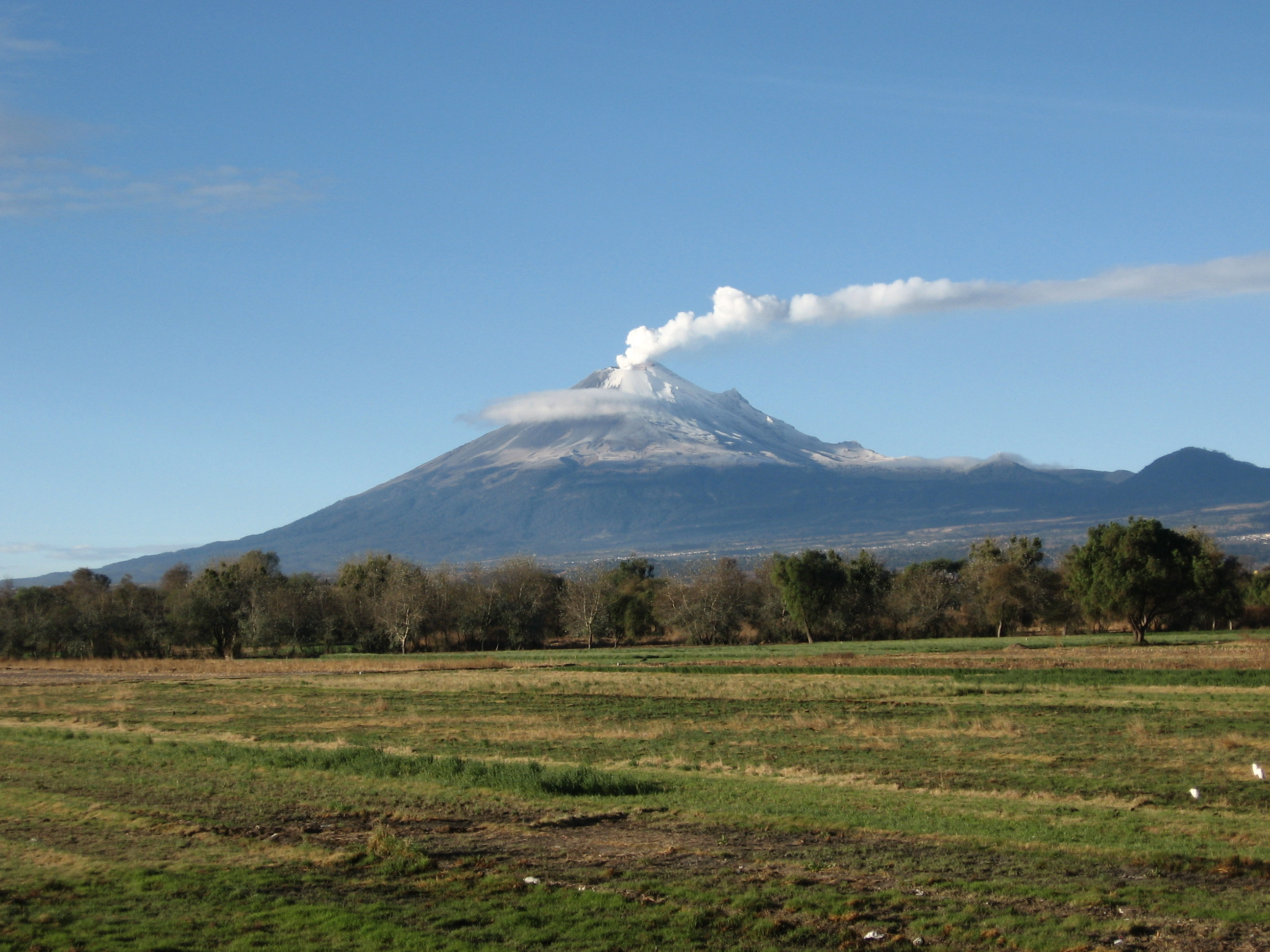
Fumaroles on Popocatépetl

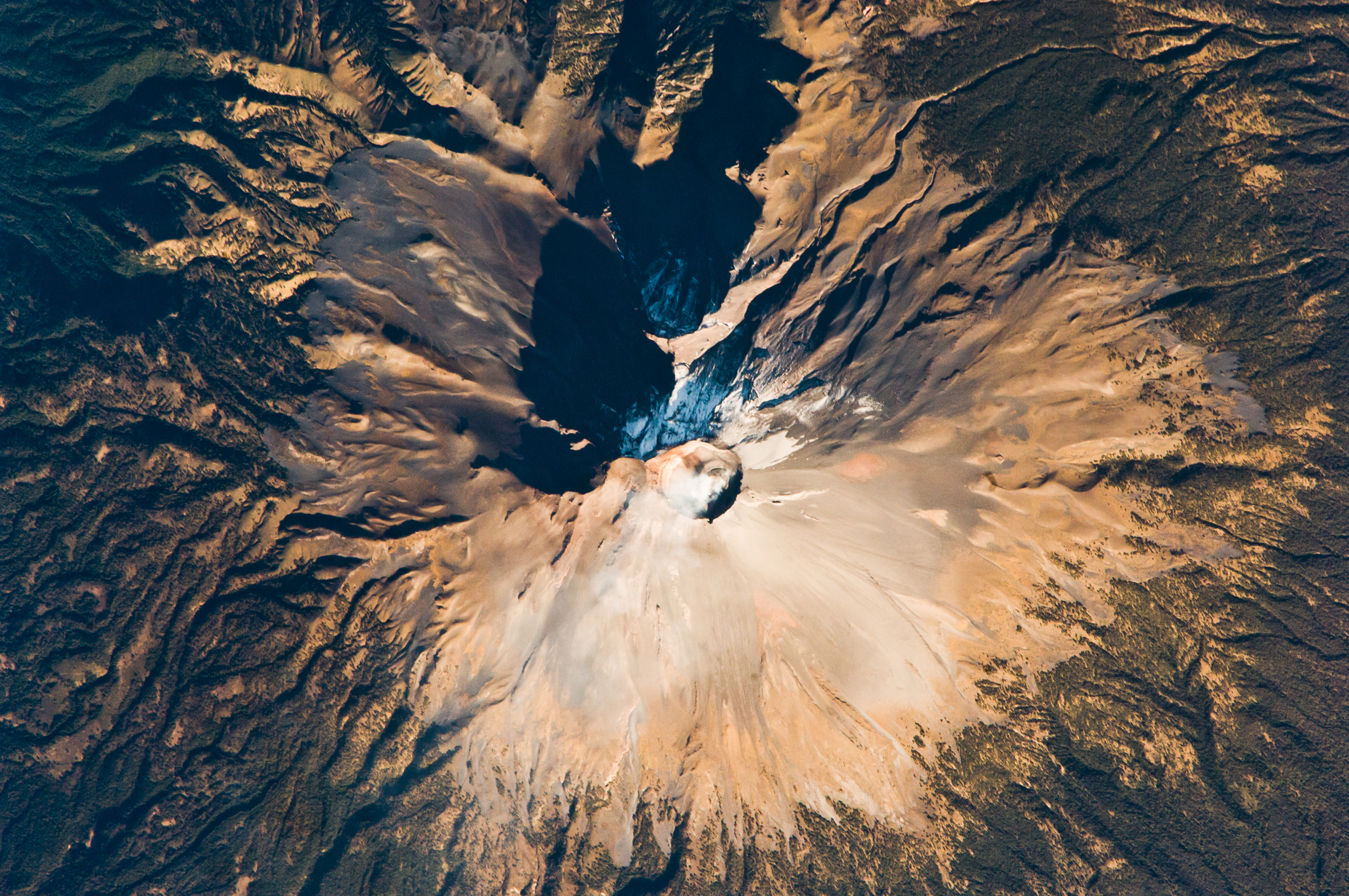
Seen from the International Space Station in February 2009

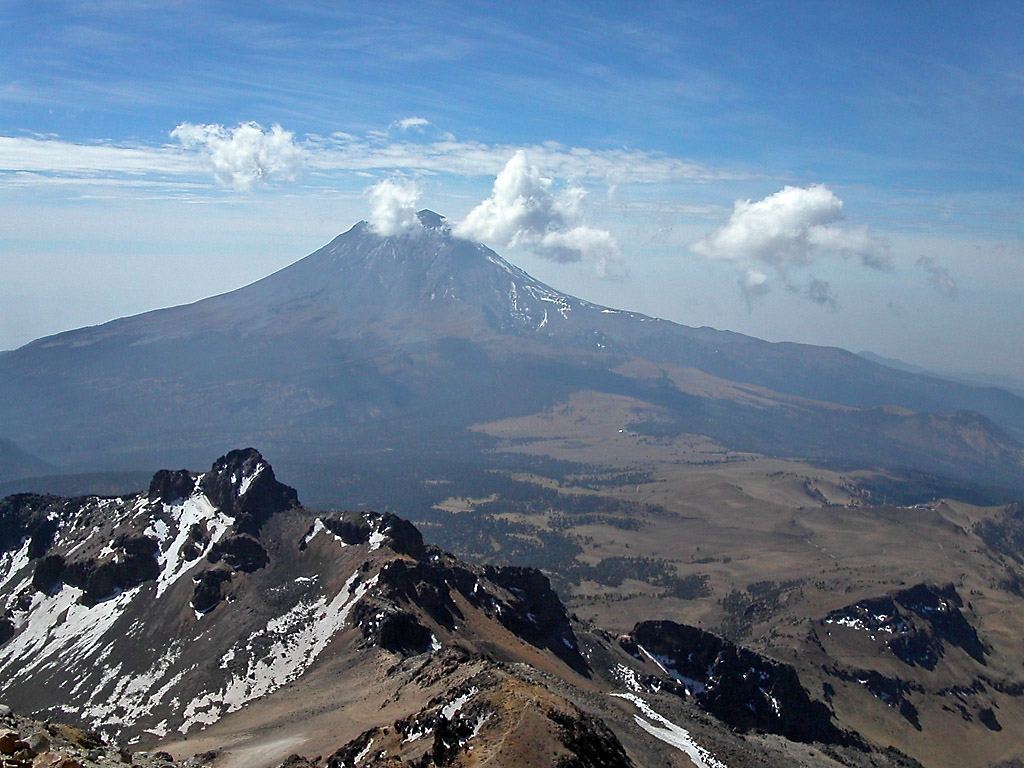
Seen from near the summit of Iztaccihuatl

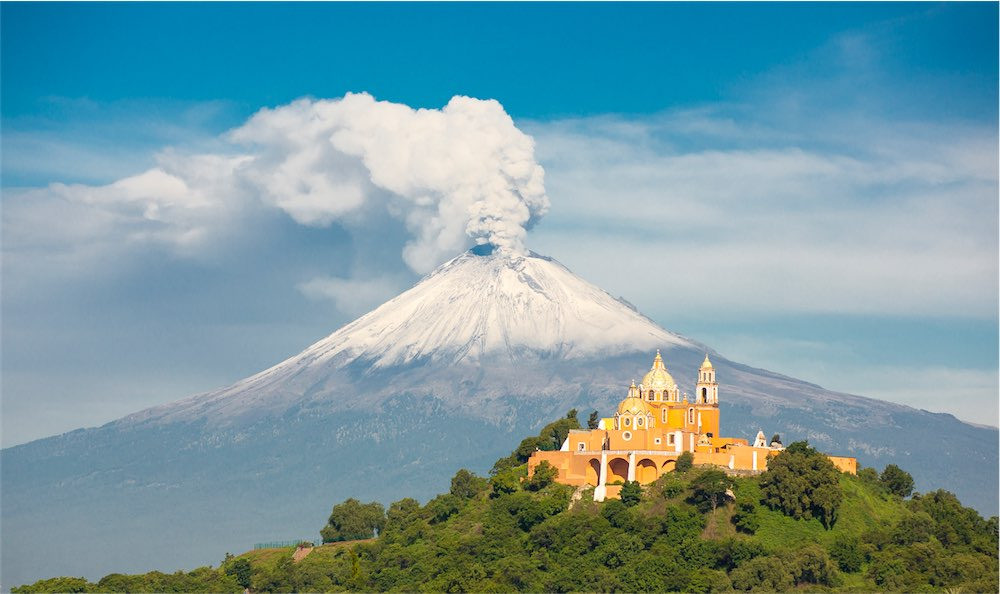
Iglesia de Nuestra Señora de los Remedios atop Great Pyramid (Tlalchihualtépetl) in Cholula, Puebla, with the volcano in the background

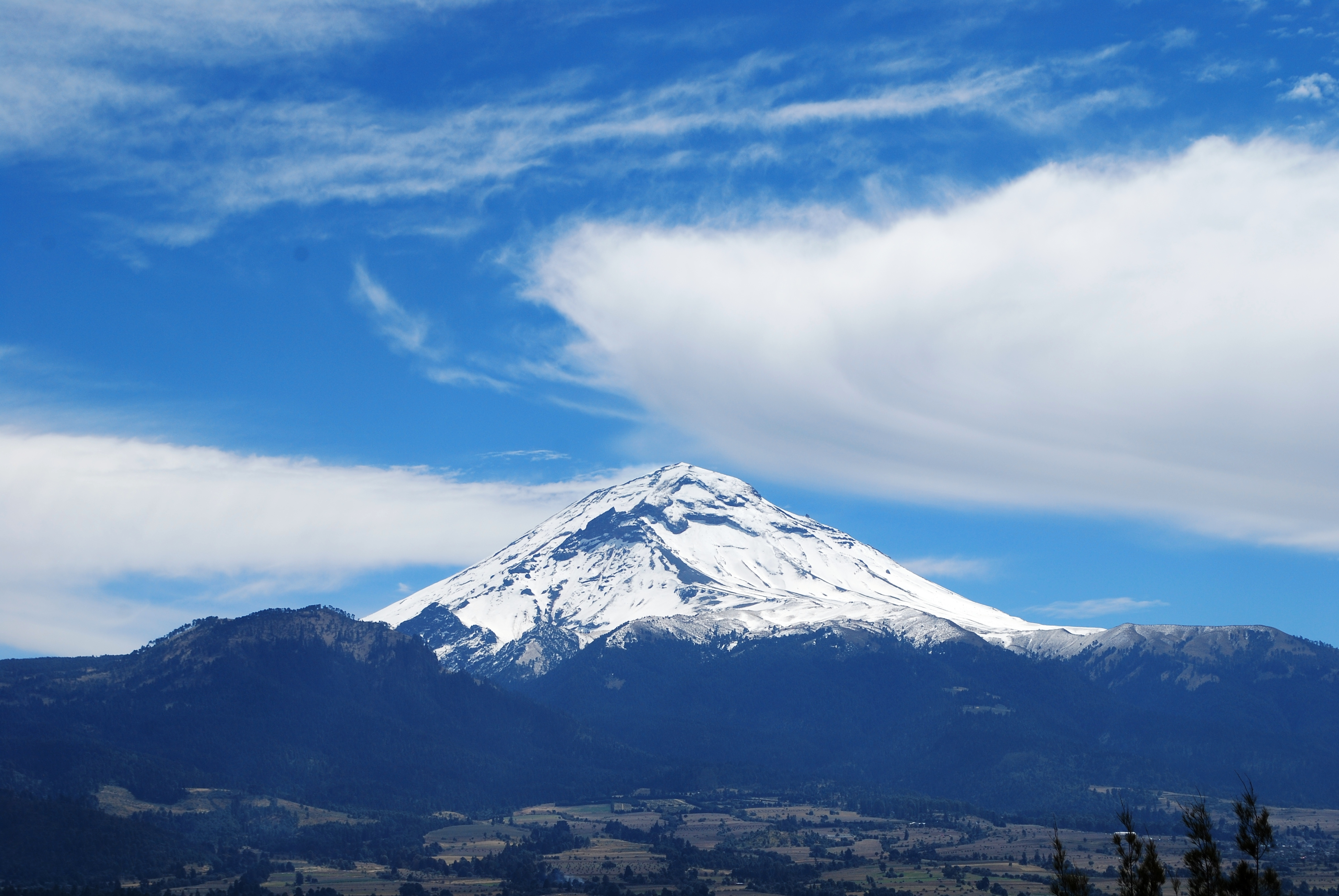
Popocatépetl, as viewed from Amecameca (looking south-east) (2011)

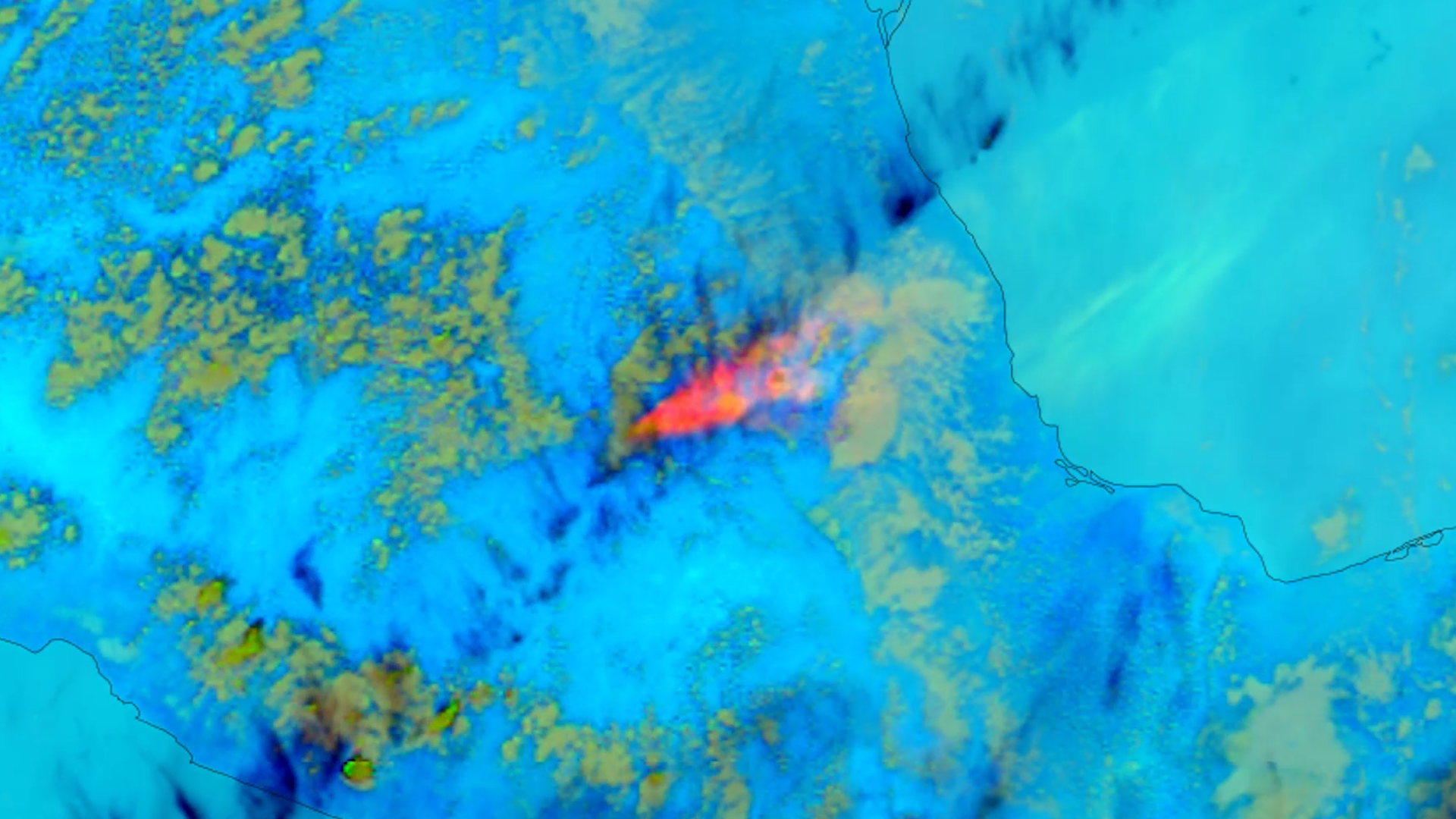
Satellite image of Popocatépetl eruption taken by NOAA

== See also ==
- List of volcanoes in Mexico
- List of Ultras of Mexico
- Legend of Popocatépetl and Iztaccíhuatl, pre-Hispanic legends on the origin of the two mountains
- 1949 Mexicana DC-3 crash which took place on this volcano
