= María Enriqueta Camarillo =

Mexican poet-novelist, short story writer and translator

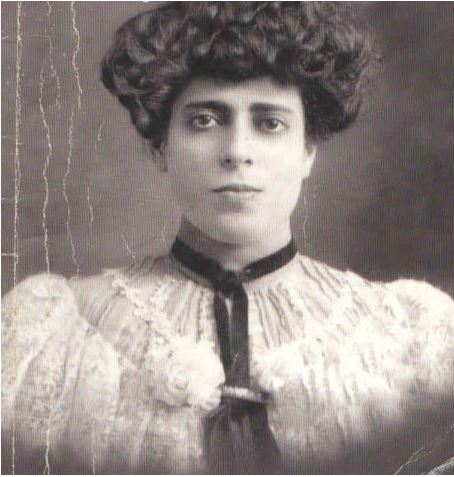
- Born: María Enriqueta Camarillo y Roa; 19 January 1872; Coatepec, Veracruz, Mexico
- Died: 13 February 1968 (aged 96); Mexico City, Mexico
- Occupation: Educator
- Years active: 1912–1955

María Enriqueta Camarillo (also known as María Enriqueta Camarillo y Roa de Pereyra) (1872–1968) was a Mexican poet-novelist, short story writer and translator. She was widely recognized for her works, with schools and libraries named after her, as well as a bust by Spanish sculptor Mariano Benlliure erected in Hidalgo Park in Mexico City in her honor. She received the 1923 literary prize from the Académie française for her novel El Secreto. She was awarded a collaborative partnership in 1927 with the Real Academia Hispano-Americana de Ciencias y Artes of Cádiz for her textbook Rosas de la Infancia. For the same work, she also received the prize for best children's literature from the Literary Salon of the Universal Exposition in Seville, Spain. Camarillo was granted the Order of Isabella the Catholic in 1947 and in 1948 received the Civil Order of Alfonso X, the Wise.

== Biography ==
María Enriqueta Camarillo y Roa was born 19 January 1872 in Coatepec, Veracruz, Mexico to Alejo Camarillo and Dolores Roa Bárcena, who was the niece of the writer José María Roa Bárcena. There is a historical plaque marking the house where she was born, located on Jiménez del Campillo Street in Coatepec. In 1879, her father was elected to the Chamber of Deputies and moved the family from Coatepec to Mexico City. In 1887, she entered the National Conservatory of Music and earned her diploma as a piano teacher in 1895. Without giving up music, Camarillo then took up painting and writing verse. In 1897, her father was posted to an administrative position in Nuevo Laredo and the family left the capital.

In 1894 she published her first poem, “Hastío,” in the literary supplement of the newspaper El Universal, using the pseudonym Ivan Moszkowski. She kept sending poems to El Universal and the Revista Azul even after the family moved to Nueva Laredo. In 1897, she began sending work to Mundo Ilustrado; El Expectador, in Monterrey; Crónica, in Guadalajara; and El Diario in Mexico City.

In 1898, Camarillo married and returned to Mexico City. Her first book, consisting of a single long poem, was published in 1902. When her father died the following year, Manuel Gutiérrez Nájera offered her the opportunity to tell his story in Revista Azul. "El maestro Floriani" was her first published prose piece and was dedicated to her father's memory. The first book of her poetry collection, Rumores de mi huerto (Rumors of my garden), appeared in 1908 and would be republished in 1922.

She worked at a feminist magazine, called La Mujer Mexicana (The Mexican Woman), from 1904 to 1906. Though the magazine ideologically supported the nineteenth-century culture of domesticity, it was one of the first Mexican magazines written by women for women. The women who wrote for La Mujer Mexicana were poets, writers, teachers, lawyers, and doctors. Besides Camarillo, they included attorney María Sandoval de Zarco; writers Dolores Roa Bárcena de Camarillo (her mother), Laura Méndez de Cuenca, Dolores Jiménez y Muro and Dolores Correa Zapata, who was also a teacher; the medical doctors Columba Rivera, Guadalupe Sánchez and Antonia Ursúa; and the teachers Luz Fernández Vda. de Herrera and Mateana Murguía de Aveleyra.

In 1912, she was commissioned by the publisher Viuda de Charles Bouret of Paris to write a series of children's books for grammar schools—one book for each grade. Rosas de la Infancia was written in 6 volumes, but only 5 were published. The work was to be used as textbooks, and after its 1914 printing, became mandatory under the educational reforms initiated by José Vasconcelos, Secretariat of Education. They remained a mainstay in Mexican education until Lázaro Cárdenas changed the national school curricula to reflect a Socialist ideology. The book won several awards from Spain as well, but they were much later, after Mexico was no longer using it as a textbook. In 1927, she was awarded a collaborative partnership with the Real Academia Hispano-Americana de Ciencias y Artes of Cádiz and in 1930, she won best children's literature for Rosas de la Infancia at the Literary Salon of the Universal Exposition in Seville, Spain.

Her first novel, Mirliton was published in Madrid in 1918 and well-received, being then translated into French. That same year, she published Jirón de Mundo (Strip of the World) and followed that with Sorpresas de la vida (Surprises of Life) in 1921. El Secreto (1922) was one of her most praised works. It was translated into Italian and Portuguese and, in Mexico, schools and libraries were renamed in her honor. A monument was erected in Hidalgo Park in Mexico City featuring a bronze bust of Camarillo, created by the Spanish sculptor Mariano Benlliure. The novel was selected in 1923, by the Académie française of France, as the best Hispanic female novel and was translated into French. She received a prize from the Académie, as well as receiving praise from Paul Valéry.

Entre el polvo de un castillo (In the dust of the castle) (1924) was a children's book. El misterio de su muerte and Enigma y Símbolo were both published in 1926, after which she returned to poetry with Album sentimental (1926). Cuentecillos de cristal (1928) was another collection of children's stories translated into Portuguese and was followed by El arca de colores in 1929. Her next book Brujas, Lisboa, Madrid was unlike anything she had written before. It was a travelogue of a sort, looking at the spirits of the cities of Bruges, Lisbon, and Madrid and how the essence of each city had affected her. Del tapiz de mi vida (Tapestry of my life) is a collection of autobiographical reflections on children, he mother's death, and travels through Belgium, Switzerland, and Spain.

Camarillo's husband was a diplomat in the service of President Porfirio Díaz. When Díaz was ousted from power, the couple went into exile in Spain. She lived in Spain for 32 years. After the death of her husband in 1942, Camarillo decided to return to Mexico and permanently returned in 1948.

In addition to her own writing, Camarillo translated works from classical French theater and literature of the seventeenth century; first-hand accounts of the French Revolution; and philosophers like Charles Augustin Sainte-Beuve, Henri-Frédéric Amiel, and Rodolphe Töpffer.

Camarillo died on 13 February 1968 in Mexico City, Mexico and was buried in the City Cemetery of Coatepec, Veracruz.

== Personal life ==
In 1898, she married the historian and diplomat Carlos Pereyra. They had no children.

Her house was converted into a museum. It is now called the "Maria Enriqueta Camarillo House Museum" and is located in her hometown of Coatepec, Veracruz, Mexico. This home was not where she was born; she received it as a gift when she returned to Mexico after living abroad for many years.

== Awards ==
- 1923 literary prize from Académie française for El Secreto, Best Hispanic female novel
- 1927 for Rosas de la Infancia was awarded a collaborative partnership with the Real Academia Hispano-Americana de Ciencias y Artes of Cádiz
- 1930 she won best children's literature for Rosas de la Infancia at the Literary Salon of the Universal Exposition in Seville, Spain
- 1947 she was granted the Order of Isabella the Catholic
- 1948 received the Civil Order of Alfonso X, the Wise

== Selected works ==
=== Poems ===
- "Hastío" El Universal, Mexico City, Mexico (1894)
- "Ruinas" El Universal, Mexico City, Mexico (1894)
- "Mis dos amores" El Universal, Mexico City, Mexico (1894)
- "Las consecuencias de un sueño" La Carpeta: Mexico City (1902) (in Spanish)
- "Rumores de mi huerto" Mexico (1908) (in Spanish) and reprinted by Juan Pueyo: Madrid (1922) (In Spanish)
- "Parnaso de Mexico: antología general" Porrua, Mexico City (1920) (in Spanish)
- "Rincones románticos" Juan Pueyo: Madrid (1922) (In Spanish)
- "Album sentimental" Espasa-Calpe: Madrid (1926) (In Spanish)
- "Poesías del Campo" Espasa-Calpe: Madrid (1935) (In Spanish)
- "Recordando dulcemente" Imprenta Sap.: Madrid (1946) (In Spanish)
- "Hojas Dispersas" Patria: Mexico (1950) (In Spanish)

=== Narratives ===
- "La puerta verde"
- "La mano de mi padre"
- "Una culebra"
- "Esquilo y Béquer"
- "Urgente"

=== Books ===
- Rosas de la infancia: lectura para los niños Viuda de Charles Bouret: Paris (1914) (In Spanish)
- Mirliton, le compagnon de Jean Gedalge: Paris (1917) (in French)
- Mirlitón J. Pueyo: Madrid (1918) (In Spanish)
- Jirón del Mundo Editorial-América: Madrid (1918) (In Spanish)
- Sorpresas de la vida Virtus: Buenos Aires (1921) (In Spanish)
- El secreto Editorial-América: Madrid (1922) (In Spanish)
- Entre el polvo de un castillo Virtus: Buenos Aires (1924) (In Spanish)
- El misterio de su muerte Calpe: Madrid (1926) (In Spanish)
- Le secret: roman Bould & Gay: Paris (1926) (in French)
- Enigma y símbolo Espasa-Calpe: Madrid (1926) (In Spanish)
- Contosinhos de cristal Anuário Comercial: Lisbon (1927) (in Portuguese)
- Lo irremediable: novelas Espasa-Calpe: Madrid (1927) (In Spanish)
- Cuentecillos de cristal Araluce: Barcelona (1928) (In Spanish)
- Mirliton: le compagnon Godalgo: Paris (1929) (in French)
- El arca de colores Espasa-Calpe: Madrid (1929) (In Spanish)
- Tres figuras amadas Juan Pueyo: Madrid (1930) (In Spanish)
- Brujas, Lisboa, Madrid Espasa-Calpe: Madrid (1930) (In Spanish)
- Del tapiz de mi vida Espasa-Calpe: Madrid (1931) (In Spanish)
- Fantasia y Realidad Espasa-Calpe: Madrid (1933) (In Spanish)
- Nuevas rosas de la infancia Patria: Mexico (1954) (In Spanish)
