= Laura Mendez =

Mexican writer and poet

Laura Méndez Lefort de Cuenca (18 August 1853 – 1 November 1928), was a Mexican writer and poet.

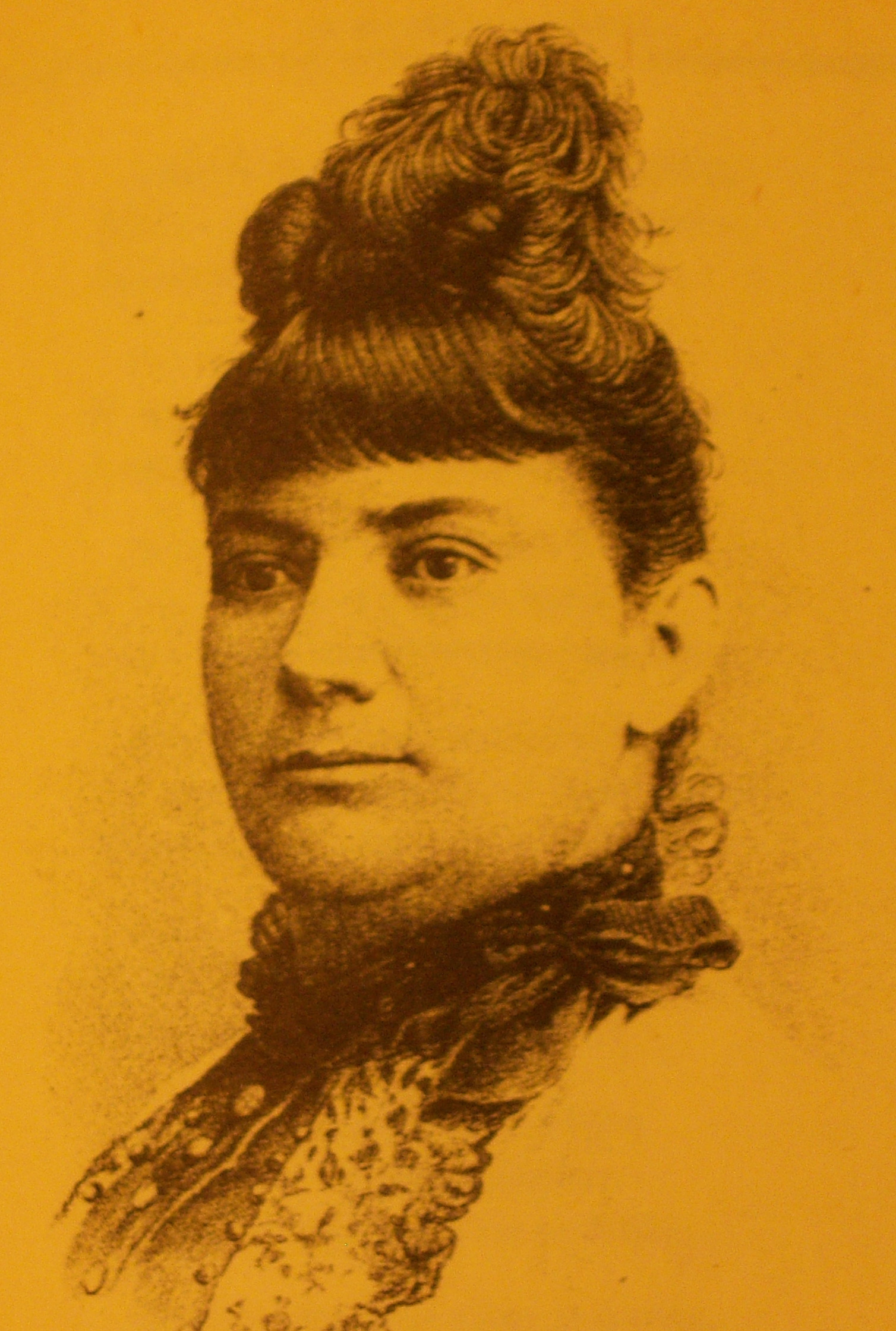
Laura Méndez of Cuenca

== Biography ==
Laura María Luisa Elena Méndez Lefort was born on Thursday, 18 August 1853 in the Hacienda de Tamariz, Amecameca, State of Mexico. She died on 1 November 1928 due to complications related to diabetes. Laura attended the Escuela de Artes y Oficios, and later taught at the Conservatorio Nacional de Música in Mexico City.

Laura Méndez went against traditional catholic gender norms of her time to pursue a career as an influential teacher and writer. She entered several literary circles during her youth through which she first met and became friends with Mexican writers of the time Augustine Manuel Acuña and F. Cuenca. Beside her literary career, Méndez was also an educator. She attended several international conferences on pedagogy as a representative of Mexico. She pushed for the modernization and secularization of Mexico's schooling system which included a three-part focus on "education, hygiene, and diet". While living in San Francisco, she submitted articles to numerous literary magazines which gave an international platform to her work as an active feminist. She co-founded The Protectorate Society of the Woman alongside Sandoval de Zarco, advancing feminism and protecting women's rights. She is remembered for fighting for women's right to education, to work, to write, and to live freely.

After Dolores Correa Zapata stepped down, Méndez became director of a feminist magazine, called La Mujer Mexicana (The Mexican Woman) published from 1904 to 1906. The ideology was directed to the nineteenth century culture of domesticity, but it was one of the first Mexican magazines written by women for women. The women who wrote for La Mujer Mexicana were poets, writers, teachers, lawyers, and doctors, including besides Méndez, attorney María Sandoval de Zarco; writers María Enriqueta Camarillo y Roa de Pereyra and her mother Dolores Roa Bárcena, Dolores Jiménez y Muro and Dolores Correa Zapata, who was also a teacher; the medical doctors Columba Rivera, Guadalupe Sánchez and Antonia Ursúa; and the teachers Luz Fernández Vda. de Herrera and Mateana Murguía de Aveleyra. Her accessible, yet powerful writing style is remembered for its role in the early advocacy of feminism and the elegant expression of one of Mexico's great writers.

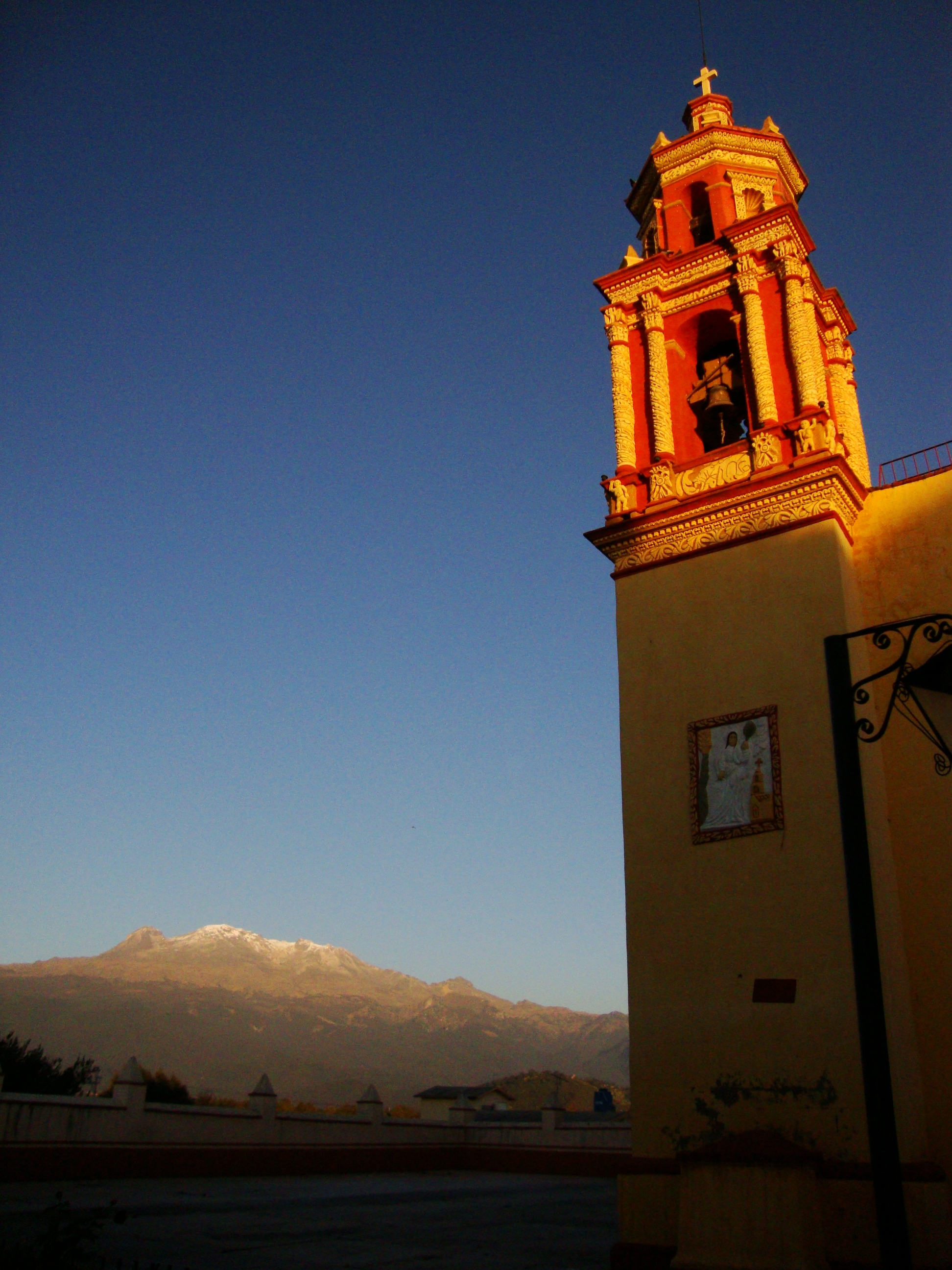
Ayapango, Mexico, birthplace of Laura Méndez de Cuenca.

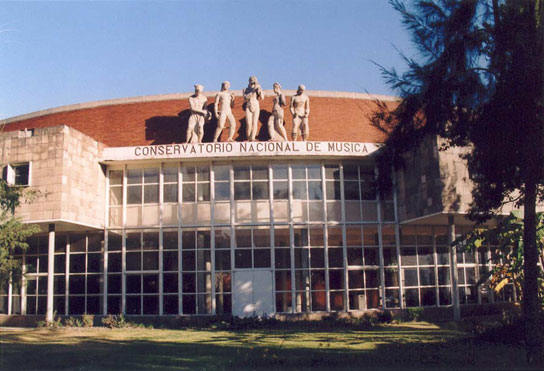
National Music Conservatory, Mexico City

== Publications ==
=== a) Original Editions ===
- El espejo de Amarilis. México: Linotipia de El Mundo y de El Imparcial, 1902. 2 vols. 164 y 178 pp.
- El Hogar Mexicano: nociones de economía doméstica. México: Herrero Hermanos, 1910. 2 vols.
- Simplezas. París: Sociedad de Ediciones Literarias y Artísticas, 1910. 270 pp.
- "Lic. Justo Sierra". En Diez civiles notables en la Historia Patria. México: Secretaría de Instrucción Pública y Bellas Artes, 1914. 184 pp.
- Álvaro Obregón. S. p. i. 122 pp. Ilus.

=== b) Contemporary Editions ===
- Mariposas fugitivas: versos. Toluca: s. e., 1953. 44p.
- Poesía rediviva. Compilación y ficha biográfica de Gonzalo Pérez Gómez. Toluca: Gobierno del Estado de México, 1977 (Serie Joaquín Arcadio Pagaza. Poetry Collection). 98 pp. Ilus.
- Simplezas. La Matraca. Second Series, 20. México: Ed. Premià, Instituto Nacional de Bellas Artes, Secretary of Public Education, 1983. 91 pp.
- La pasión a solas: Poetic Anthology. Selection, Prologue, and Notes: Raúl Cáceres Carenzo. Ediciones, 9. Toluca: Instituto Mexiquense de Cultura, 1984. 89 pp. [Second Edition, Mexican Classics, 1987.]
- Simplezas [Selection of Stories: La Venta del Chivo Prieto, La gobernadora, Heroína de miedo, La tía de don Antonio, Buches para la belleza, El señor de las amapolas y La tanda]. En Las voces olvidadas. Antología crítica de narradoras mexicanas nacidas en el siglo XIX. Edition of Ana Rosa Domenella y Nora Pasternac. México: Programa Interdisciplinario de Estudios de la Mujer, El Colegio de México, 1991. pp. 139–177. [Segunda edición: 1997.]^{6}
- Laura Méndez de Cuenca. Su herencia cultural. 3 vols. México: Gobierno del Estado de México, Siglo XXI, 2011.

=== El decantado femenismo ===
This influential article discusses the role of men and women in activism and argues that feminism was not a new fight, but a newly strong fight which has existed since the beginning of man.

"Esto que hoy llaman feminismo y que ha llenado de alarma al sexo masculino, no es en realidad, nuevo más que como impulso de solidaridad. Como fermento ha existido desde que el hombre apareció sobre la Tierra. Lo mismo en la antigüedad que en nuestros días, la mujer ha tenido participación en todas las luchas sociales"

== Critical postulate ==
Reports by Laura Mendez de Cuenca sent from St. Louis Missouri in the early 1900s regarding elementary school education were characterized by a critical spirit unique to the time.

“Her decisions demonstrate a radical posture, her style is caustic and impassioned, her judgements are the product of a long teaching career, and in comparison with other teachers’ writings, her critical spirit is exceptional.”
