= Popocatépetl and Iztaccíhuatl =

Legend of the origin of two mountains in Mexico

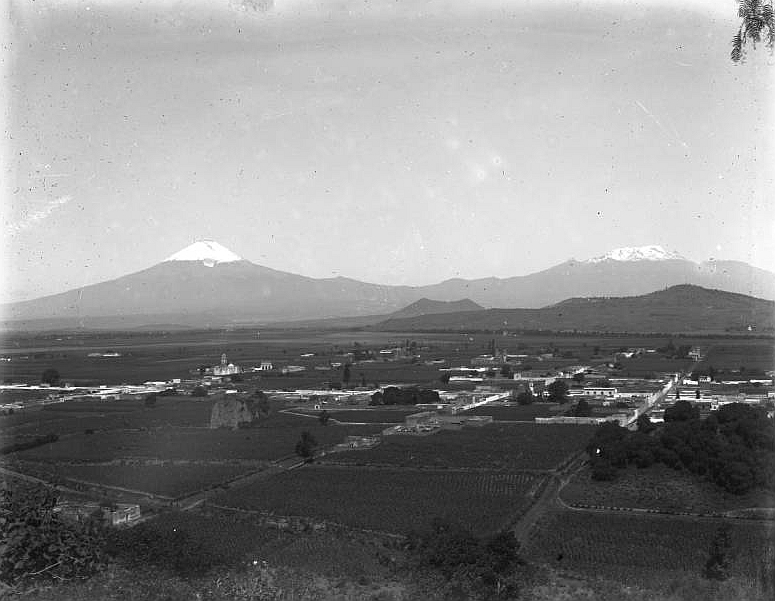
View of the Puebla Valley, with Popocatépetl and Iztaccíhuat 1906

Popocatépetl and Iztaccíhuatl refers to the volcanoes Popocatépetl ("the Smoking Mountain") and Iztaccíhuatl ("White (like salt) woman" in Nahuatl, sometimes called the Mujer Dormida "sleeping woman" in Spanish) in Iztaccíhuatl–Popocatépetl National Park, which overlook the Valley of Mexico and the various myths explaining their existence. The most common variety relates the Nahua romance of the princess Iztaccíhuatl and the warrior Popocatépetl. This tale is recorded in several different versions.

A summary based on one version as recounted at a September 2006 "Myth, Mortals and Immortality: Works from the Museo Soumaya de México" exhibition at the Smithsonian Institution.

== Náhua legends ==
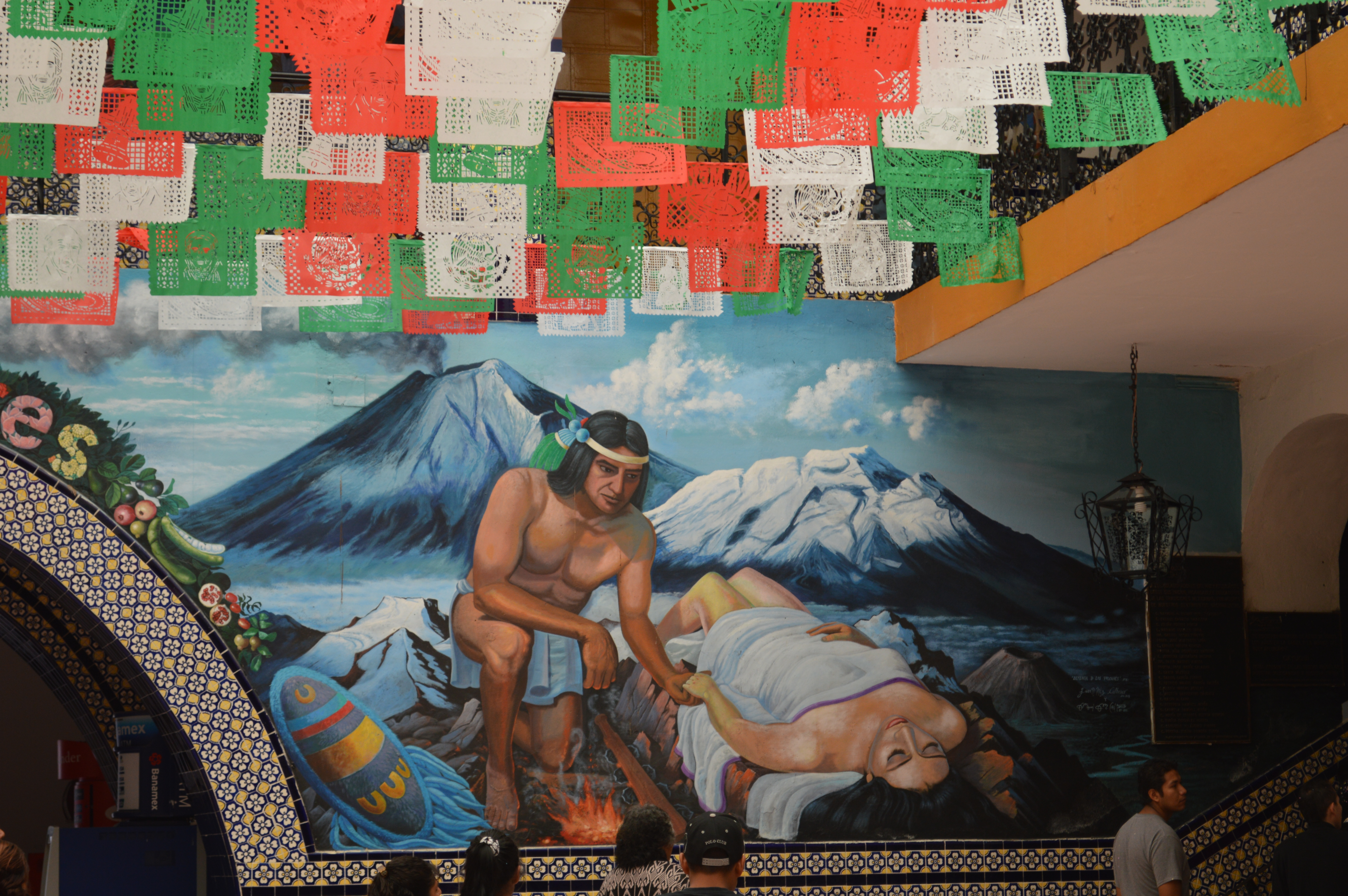
Mural depicting the legend of Popocatepetl and Iztacihuatl inside the municipal palace of Atlixco, Puebla

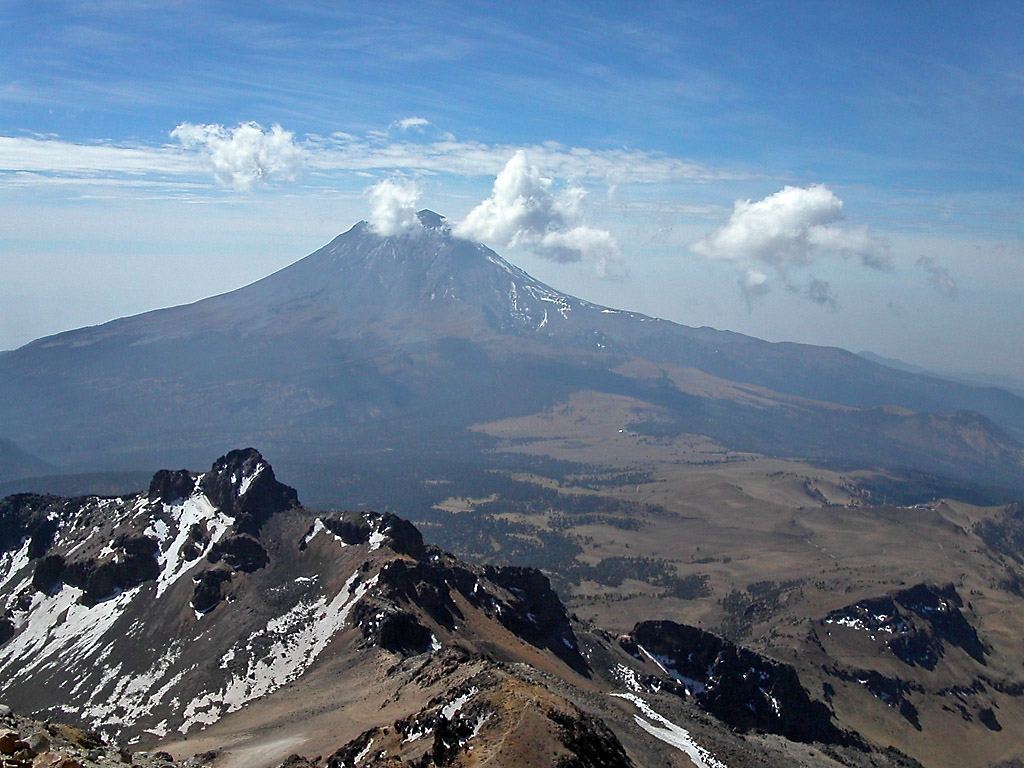
Popocatépetl from near the summit of Iztaccíhuatl

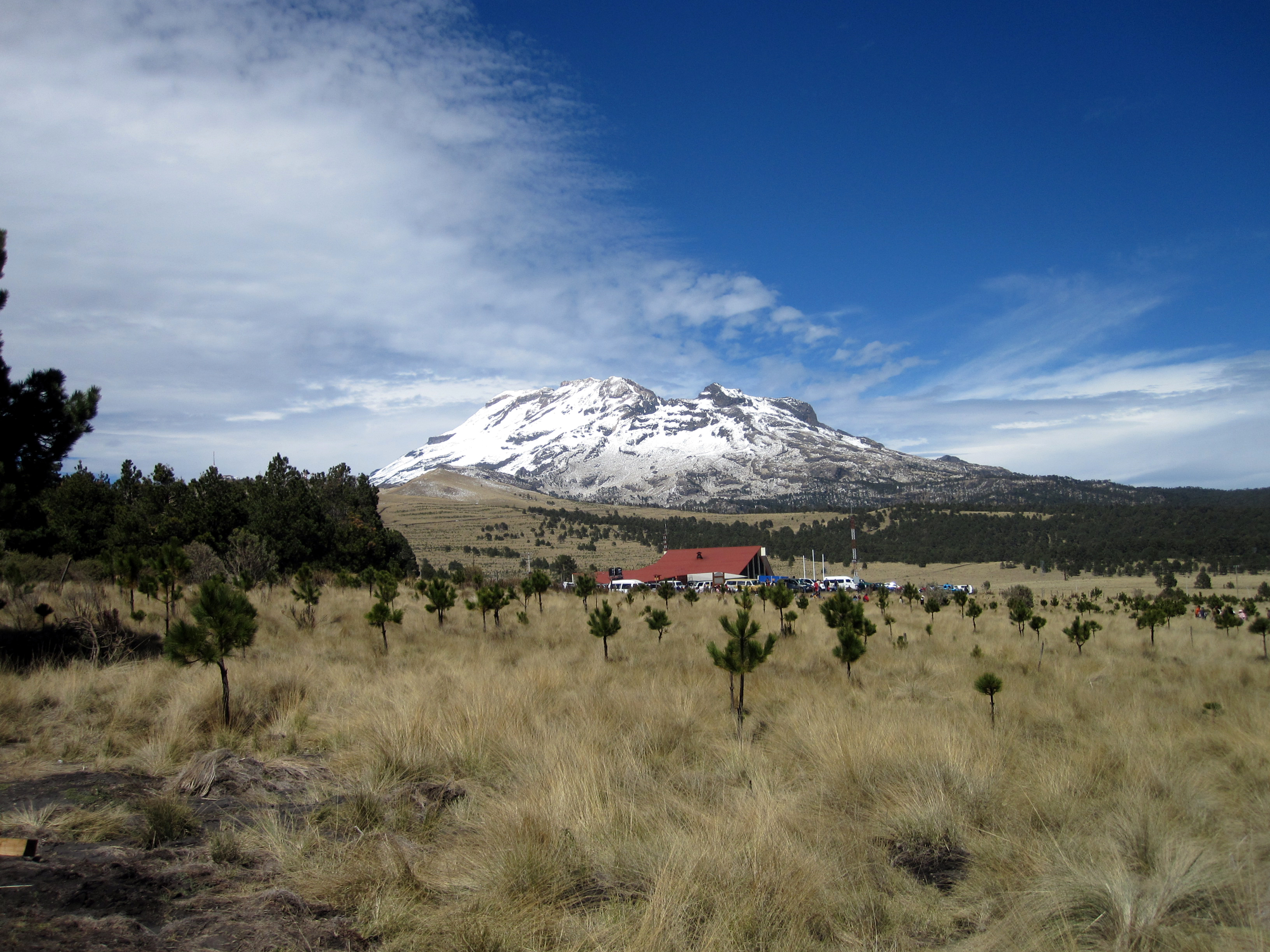
Iztaccíhuatl, as seen from the slopes of Popocatépetl in Paso Cortés, Mexico

In Aztec mythology, Iztaccíhuatl was a princess who fell in love with one of her father's warriors, Popocatépetl. The emperor sent Popocatépetl to war in Oaxaca, promising him Iztaccíhuatl as his wife when he returned (which Iztaccíhuatl's father presumed he would not). Iztaccíhuatl was falsely told that Popocatépetl had died in battle, and believing the news, she died of grief. When Popocatépetl returned to find his love dead, he took her body to a spot outside Tenochtitlan and kneeled by her grave. The gods covered them with snow and changed them into mountains. Iztaccíhuatl's mountain is called "Sleeping Woman" (Though the Nahuatl name literally means "White Woman" from iztāc "white" and cihuātl "woman") because it resembles a woman lying on her back, and is often covered with snow — the peak is sometimes nicknamed La Mujer Dormida, "The Sleeping Woman". Popocatépetl became an active volcano, raining fire on Earth in blind rage at the loss of his beloved.

A different tale was told by the Nahuatl-speakers of Tetelcingo, Morelos, according to whom Iztaccíhuatl was the wife of Popo, but Xinantécatl wanted her, and he and Popocatépetl hurled rocks at each other in anger. This was the genesis of the rocky mountain ranges of the continental divide and the Trans-Mexican Volcanic Belt that lie between the two mountains. Finally Popocatépetl, in a burst of rage, flung an enormous chunk of ice, decapitating the Nevado de Toluca. This is why the Nevado is flat-topped, with wide shoulders but no head. Conceivably this legend preserves the memory of catastrophic eruptions. There is a map called the "Mapa de peligros del Volcán Popocatépetal" (1995) created to forecast Popocatépetl's eruptions, linked to the legend of his lost Iztaccíhuatl.

The most popular legend about Iztaccíhuatl and Popocatépetl comes from the ancient Nahuas. As it comes from an oral tradition, there are many versions of the same story, along with poems and songs telling this story:

Many years before conquistador Hernán Cortés came to Mexico, the Aztecs lived in Tenochtitlan, today's Mexico City. The chief of the Aztecs was a famous Emperor, who was loved by all the natives. The Emperor and his wife, the Empress, were very worried because they had no children. One day the Empress said to the Emperor that she was going to give birth to a child. A baby girl was born and she was as beautiful as her mother. They called her Iztaccíhuatl, which in Náhuatl means "white lady". All the natives loved Izta, and her parents prepared her to be the Empress of the Aztecs. When she grew up, she fell in love with a captain of a tribe, his name was Popoca, however the Emperor would not allow them to marry.

One day, a war broke out with the fate of the Empire at stake, and the Aztec warriors had to go South to fight the enemy. The Emperor told Popoca that he had to bring the head of the enemy chief back from the war, so he could marry his daughter. After several months of combat, a warrior who hated Popoca sent a false message to the Emperor. The message said that his army had won the war, but that Popoca had died in battle. The Emperor was very sad when he heard the news, and when Izta heard she could not stop crying. She refused to go out and did not eat any more. A few days later, she became ill and she died of sadness.

When the Emperor was preparing Izta's funeral, Popoca and his warriors returned victorious from the war. The Emperor was taken aback when he saw Popoca but prepared to offer the throne, to which Popoca turned down as he only wanted to marry Izta. The Emperor announced that Izta had died of a broken heart. Popoca killed the warriors who had sent the false message to the Emperor. He then took Izta's body and left the town. He walked a long way until he arrived at some mountains where he ordered his warriors to build a funeral table with flowers and he put Izta lying on top. Then he knelt down to watch over Izta and died of sadness too. The Gods were touched by Popoca's sacrifice and turned the tables and the bodies into great volcanoes. The biggest volcano is Popocatépetl, which in Náhuatl means "smoking mountain". He sometimes throws out smoke, showing that he is still watching over Iztaccíhuatl, who sleeps by his side.

Another tale is much like the one before: Some warriors did not want Popoca to be with Izta, since they liked her themselves; and sent a message to the emperor saying that Popoca died. Izta became very sad and died of grief. When Popoca returned, he heard about Izta's death and became sad himself. He went out of town with Izta's body and ordered his soldiers to make a mound for him and Izta. He put Izta's body on one mound and got onto the other with a smoking torch. He remains there forever, looking after Izta, and, as time passed, dirt, snow, rocks, and Mother Nature covered them, turning them into great mountains. Popoca's torch is still smoking as a reminder of what happened.

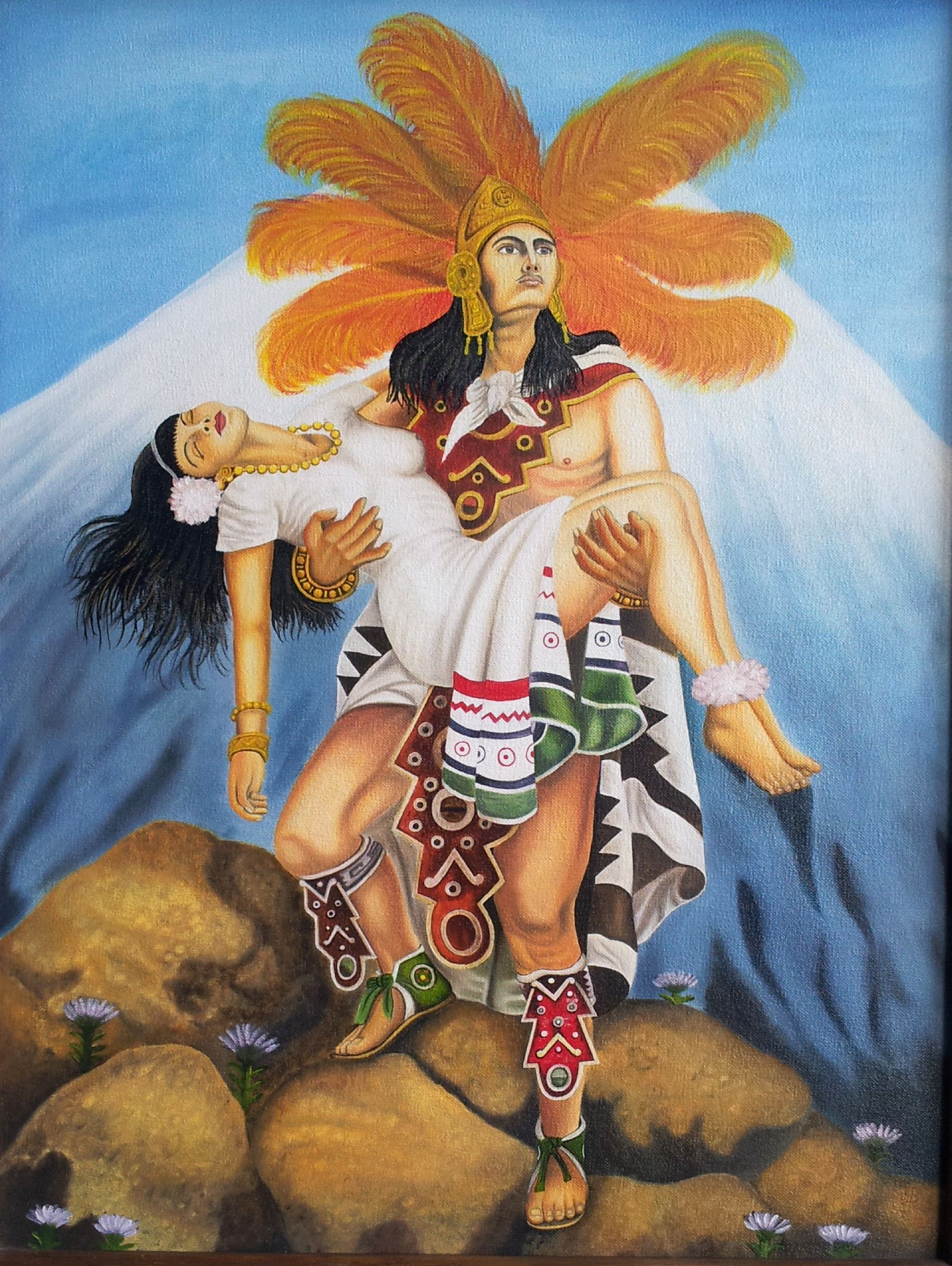
Popocatépetl and Iztaccíhuatl

=== The Legend Depicted and Legitimized Through Art ===
The legend of Popocatépetl and Iztaccíhuatl is a significant example of Mexican folklore that has endured for generations from the Aztecs to present day in Mexico, the United States of America, and throughout the world. With its roots in Aztec mythology, the beloved yet tragic love story is continuously shown through art. The two lovers are displayed in murals, calendars, restaurants, bakeries in barrios throughout the United States, and in the Smithsonian American Art Museum. The renowned image of Popocatépetl carrying his beloved Iztaccíhuatl in his arms is prevalent in Mexican American culture and has been the focus of many paintings. Many famous artists such as Diego Rivera, Heriberto Friás, John O'Gorman and Frida Khalo have painted the mythic tale of tragic love.

=== The Legend as Chicano Iconography ===
The love story of Popocatepetl and Iztaccíhuatl serves as a symbol of Chicano culture and Mexican culture in the United States and beyond. The emblematic image of the two lovers can be seen in wall art in homes and businesses. In Chicano communities one will find their images on calendars, t-shirts, and on vehicles. Although many people are familiar with the iconic image, many do not know the story behind the art. The image of the strong warrior Popocatépetl carrying Iztaccíhuatl in his arms is an avenue to connect Chicanos to their indigenous roots.

=== A Gendered Perspective on the Legend ===
The Aztec myth and image of Popocatépetl and Iztaccíhuatl can be considered as patriarchal and heteronormative by many. The dark-skinned, masculine Popocatépetl carries the voluptuous Iztaccíhuatl, the "sleeping woman" (dead) to the mountain. Feminist scholars have issues with the depiction of the princess per its portrayal of women as passive, weak creatures. Because of the gendered nature of the image, many find the image difficult to identify with.

== See also ==
- Twin peak
