= Paso de Cortés =

Mountain pass in Mexico

Coordinates: 19°05′12″N 98°38′49″W

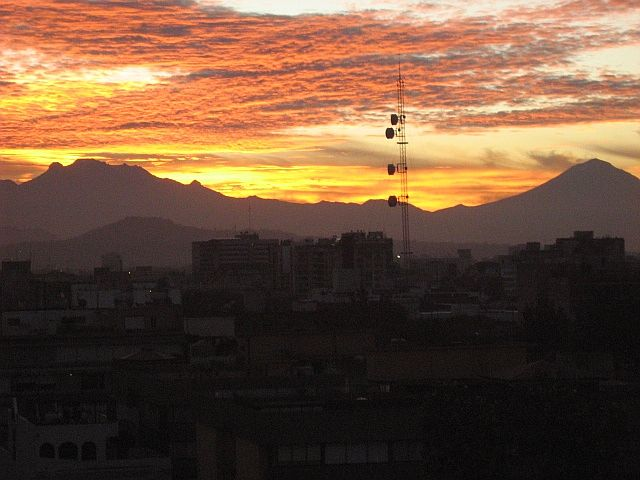
The pass in 2010

Paso de Cortés (Pass of Cortés), officially proposed to be renamed to Paso de los Pueblos Indígenas (Pass of the Indigenous Peoples), is a mountain pass between the Popocatépetl and Iztaccihuatl volcanoes in central Mexico. Historically known in Nahuatl as Tlamacaxco or Cuauhichcac, it is part of the Trans-Mexican Volcanic Belt, at a point where the southeast-trending continental divide turns north for over 16 km (10 mi). The altitude of the pass ranges between 3,600 m (11,800 ft) and 3,800 m (12,500 ft), and serves as the access point to Izta-Popo Zoquiapan National Park. The pass is located in the municipality of Amecameca in the State of México, about 90 km (56 mi) southeast of Mexico City.

== History ==
The name derives from the transit of conquistador Hernán Cortés and his men over the pass in 1519. After the battle of Cholula, the Spanish continued northwest into the Valley of Mexico and the city of Tenochtitlán to confront the Aztecs and their emperor Moctezuma.

The former name of the site was known as Tlamacaxco ('upper pass') or Cuauhichcac ('eagle's talon').

In 2026, President Claudia Sheinbaum proposed the pass to be officially named Paso de los Pueblos Indígenas.

== Flora and fauna ==
The predominant plant communities in the park are montane conifer forests and alpine grasslands. Mexican mountain pine and sacred fir are the most common species. Since the forest canopy is not too thick, many other tree and shrub species of the Senecio, Ribes, Muhlenbergia, Agrostis, Brachypodium, Lupinus and Festuca genus inhabit the zone.

== Access ==
There is a paved road from Amecameca on the Mexico City side to Paso de Cortés, and from there south to Tlamacas towards Popocatépetl or north to the area near the base of Iztaccihuatl. The pass can also be reached on dirt trails from Cholula, which are at least sometimes passable by 4-wheel-drive vehicles.
