= Jesús Helguera =

Mexican artist (1910–1971)

Jesus Helguera
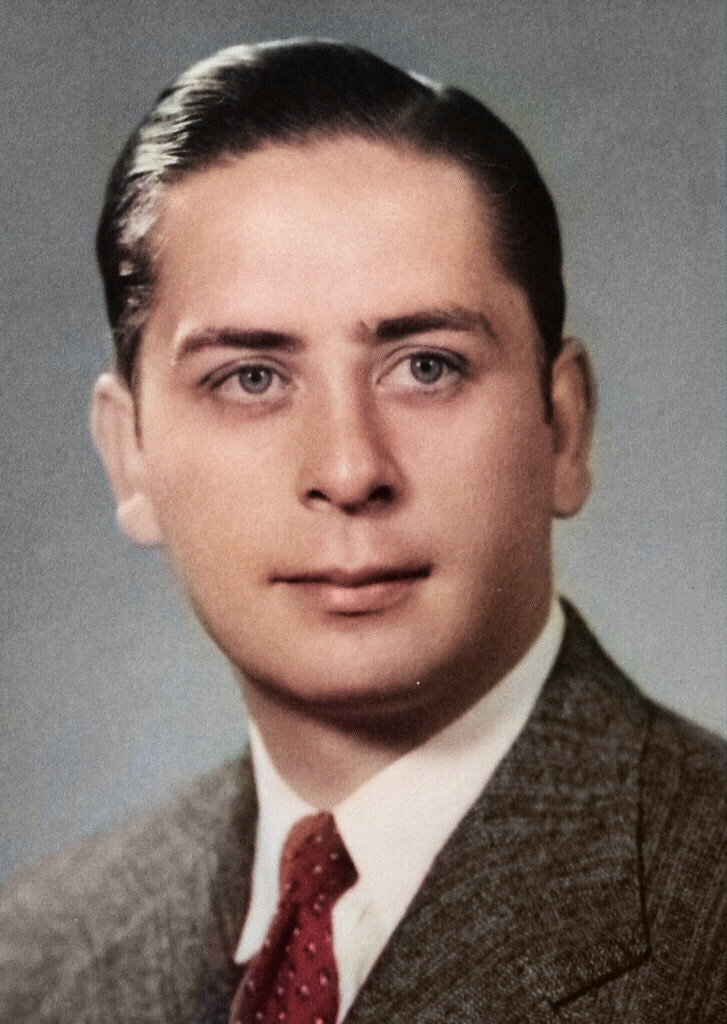
- Born: Jesus Enrique Emilio de la Helguera Espinoza; 28 May 1910; Chihuahua, Mexico
- Died: 5 December 1971 (aged 61); Córdoba, Veracruz, Mexico
- Education: Escuela Superior de Bellas Artes
- Known for: Painting
- Works: ¡Oh Patria mia! (1937); Hidalgo (1957); La Leyenda de los Volcanes (1940); La Malinche (1937); Amor Indio (1965); Doña Sol (1943)
- Movement: Modernism

Jesús Helguera (May 28, 1910 – December 5, 1971) was a Mexican painter. Among his most famous works are La Leyenda de los Volcanes, La Leyenda, Popocapetl & Ixtaccihuatl, Hidalgo, "Rompiendo las Cadenas", El Aguila y la Serpiente, and Juan Diego y la Virgen de Guadalupe.

== Biography ==
=== Early life ===
Jesús Enrique Emilio de la Helguera Espinoza was born to Spanish economist Alvaro Garcia Helguera and Maria Espinoza Escarzaga on May 28, 1910, in Chihuahua, Mexico. He lived his childhood in Mexico City and later moved to Córdoba in the state of Veracruz. His family fled from the Mexican Revolution to Ciudad Real, Castilla la Nueva, Spain and thereafter moved to Madrid. Jesús first gained interest in the arts during primary school and would often be found wandering the halls of the Del Prado Museum. At the age of 14, he was admitted to the Escuela Superior de Bellas Artes and later studied at the Academia de San Fernando. Helguera later married Julia Gonzalez Llanos, a native of Madrid, who modeled for many of his later paintings and with whom he raised two children.

=== Career ===
Jesús first worked as an illustrator at the Editorial Araluce working on books, magazines and comics with many of his published works done in gouache. He became a professor of visual arts at a Bilbao Art Institute at the age of 18 and worked for magazines such as Estampa. Helguera was forced to move back to the Mexican state of Veracruz due to the outbreak of the Spanish Civil War and following economic crisis. Upon his arrival, mural making was en vogue and he was hired by Cigarrera la Moderna, a tobacco company, to produce calendar artwork printed by Imprenta Galas de Mexico. Much of his work reflected his own fascination with Aztec Mythology, Catholicism, pin-up girls and the diverse Mexican landscape. His paintings showed an idealized Mexico and it was his romantic approach that gave his paintings the heroic impact that eventually made him famous. In 1940, he created what is arguably the most famous amongst his paintings, La Leyenda de los Volcanes, which was inspired by the legend of Popocatépetl and Iztaccíhuatl. It was later purchased by Ensenanza Objectiva, a producer of didactic images for schools. Many of his paintings would later be reproduced in a variety of different calendars and cigar boxes reaching households and businesses throughout Mexico.

=== Death and legacy ===
Helguera continued to paint privately and illustrate for various clients until his death on December 5, 1971. Jesus Helguera continues to be celebrated in Mexico, Spain and the United States.
