= Iztaccihuatl =

Volcano in Mexico

Iztaccíhuatl
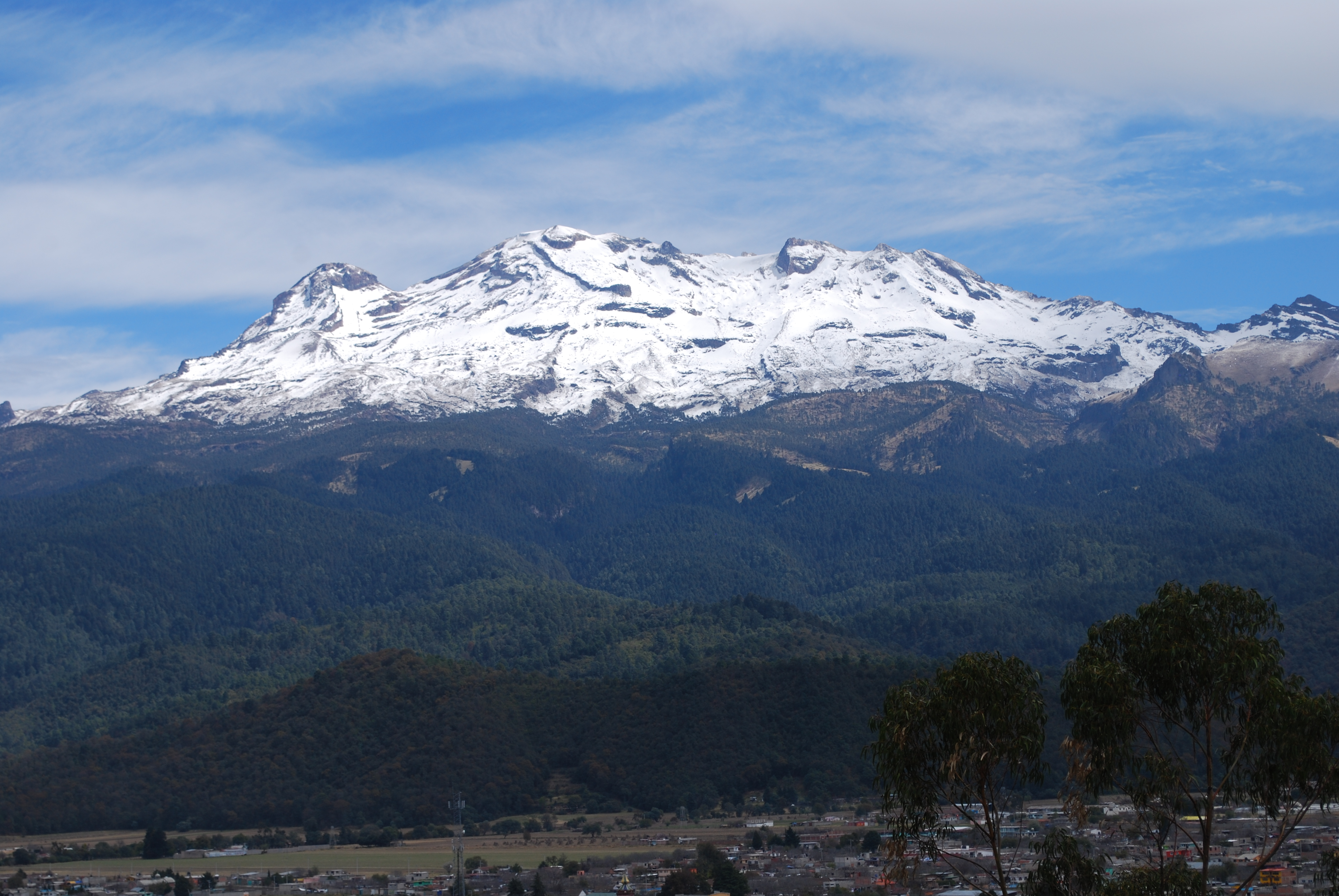
- Iztaccíhuatl from Amecameca

Highest point
- Elevation: 5,230 m (17,160 ft)
- Prominence: 1,530 m (5,020 ft)
- Listing: North America highest peaks 8th; Mexico highest major peaks 3rd; Mexico prominent peaks 25th
- Coordinates: 19°10′44″N 98°38′30″W

Geography
- Location within Mexico Location within North America
- Location: México and Puebla, Mexico

Geology
- Volcanic belt: Trans-Mexican Volcanic Belt
- Last eruption: Holocene

Climbing
- First ascent: 1889 by James de Salis
- Easiest route: rock/snow climb

Iztaccíhuatl or Ixtaccíhuatl (both forms also spelled without the accent) (Nahuatl pronunciation: [istakˈsiwat͡ɬ] or, as spelled with the x, [iʃtakˈsiwat͡ɬ]) is a 5,230 m (17,160 ft) dormant volcanic mountain in Mexico located on the border between the State of Mexico and Puebla within Izta-Popo Zoquiapan National Park. It is the nation's third highest, after Pico de Orizaba at 5,636 m (18,491 ft), and Popocatépetl at 5,426 m (17,802 ft).

The name "Iztaccíhuatl" is Nahuatl for "White (like salt) woman", reflecting the four individual snow-capped peaks which depict the head, chest, knees and feet of a sleeping female when seen from east or west. Iztaccíhuatl is to the north of its twin Popocatépetl, to which it is connected by the high altitude Paso de Cortés. Depending on atmospheric conditions Iztaccíhuatl is visible much of the year from Mexico City some 70 km (43 mi) to the northwest. The first recorded ascent was made in 1889, though archaeological evidence suggests the Mexica and previous cultures climbed it previously. It is the lowest peak containing permanent snow and glaciers in Mexico.

== Geology ==
The summit ridge of the massive 450 km^{3} (110 cu mi) volcano is a series of overlapping cones constructed along a NNW-SSE line to the south of the Pleistocene Llano Grande caldera. There have been andesitic and dacitic Pleistocene and Holocene eruptions from vents at or near the summit. Areas near the El Pecho summit vent are covered in flows and tuff beds post-dating glaciation, approximately 11,000 years ago. The most recent vents are at El Pecho and a depression at 5,100 m (16,700 ft) along the summit ridge midway between El Pecho and Los Pies.

== Legend of Popocatépetl and Iztaccíhuatl ==
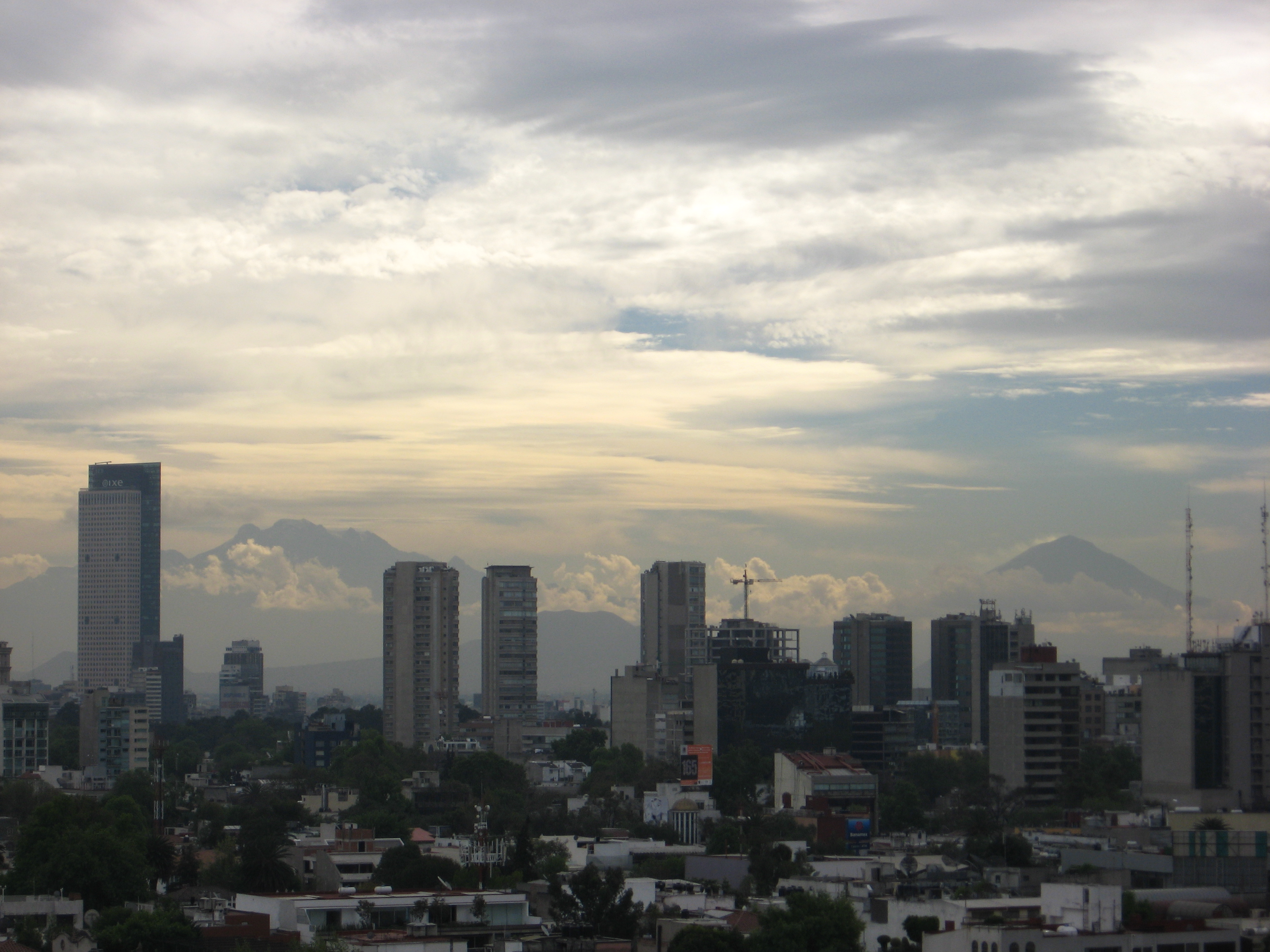
Forshortened view of Iztaccíhuatl and Popocatépetl from the Polanco district of Mexico City

In Tlaxcaltecan mythology, Iztaccíhuatl was a princess who fell in love with one of her father's warriors, Popocatépetl. The emperor sent Popocatépetl to war in Oaxaca, promising him Iztaccíhuatl as his wife when he returned (which Iztaccíhuatl's father presumed he would not). Iztaccíhuatl was falsely told that Popocatépetl had died in battle, and believing the news, she died of grief. When Popocatépetl returned to find his love dead, he took her body to a spot outside Tenochtitlan and knelt by her grave. The gods covered them with snow and changed them into mountains. Iztaccíhuatl's mountain is called "White Woman" (from Nahuatl iztāc "white" and cihuātl "woman") because it resembles a woman lying on her back, and is often covered with snow — the peak is sometimes nicknamed La Mujer Dormida, "The Sleeping Woman". Popocatépetl became an active volcano, raining fire on Earth in blind rage at the loss of his beloved.

== Elevation ==
Iztaccihuatl is usually listed at 5,286 m (17,343 ft), but SRTM data and the Mexican national mapping survey assert that a range of 5,220 to 5,230 m (17,130 to 17,160 ft) is more accurate. The Global Volcanism Program cites 5,230 m (17,160 ft).

== Gallery ==
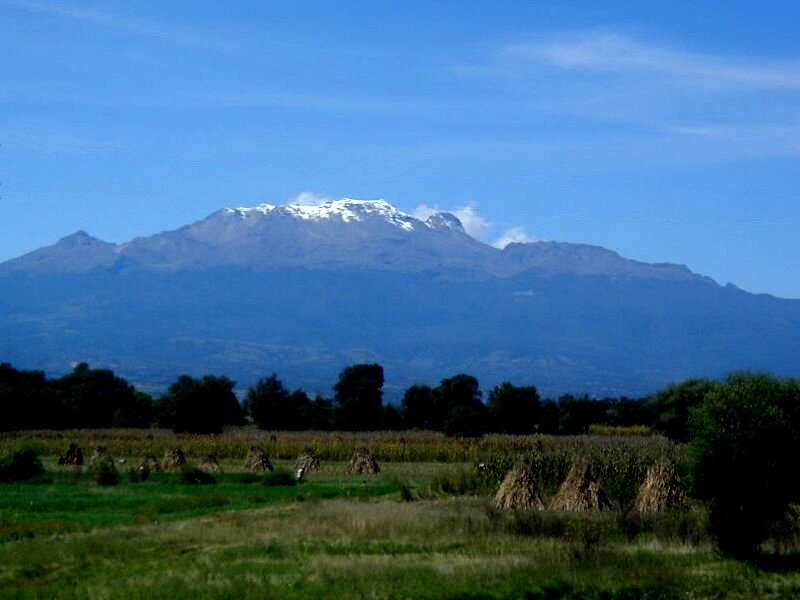
Iztaccíhuatl from the Puebla side

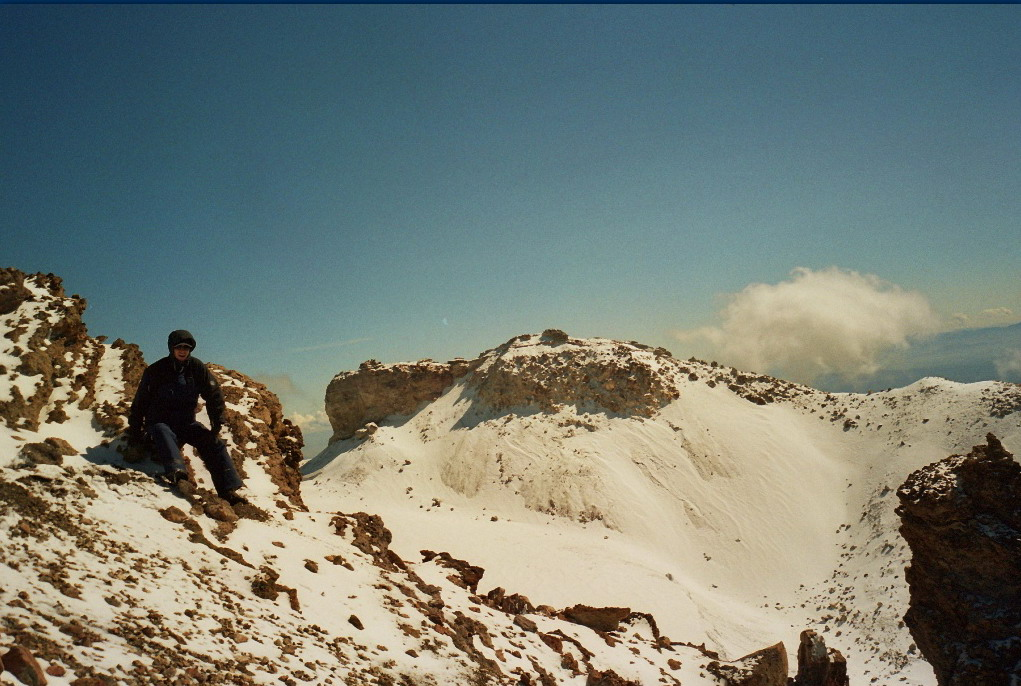
Around the Knees (5,000 m (3.1 miles)) of Iztaccíhuatl

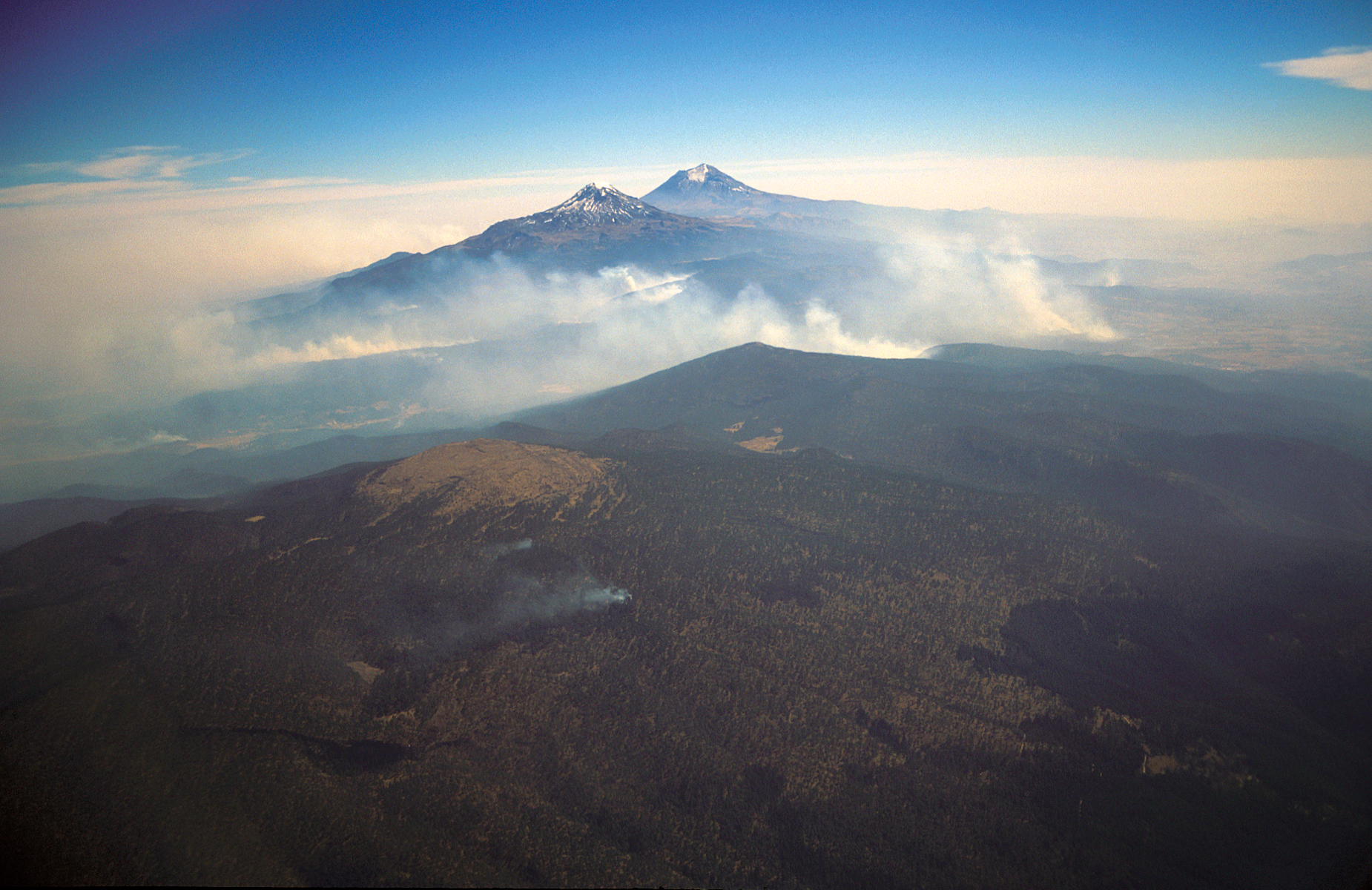
Forest fires on the slopes

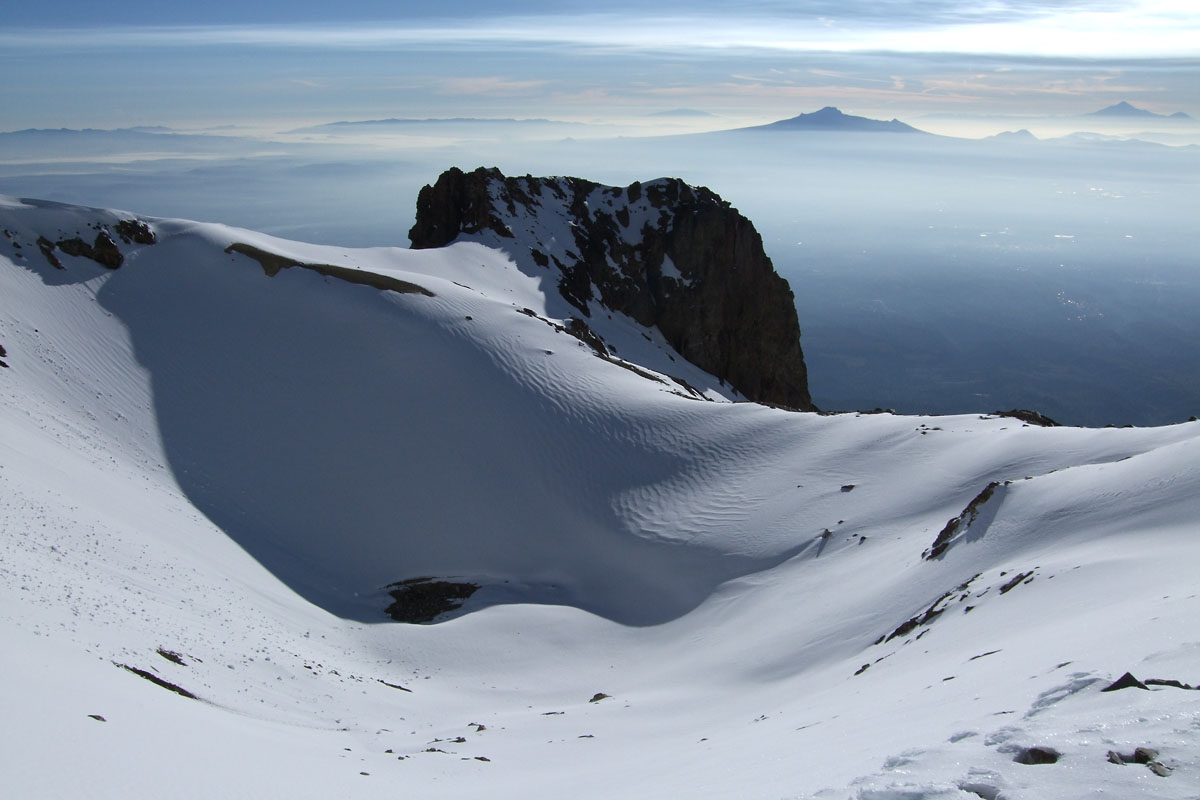
View from the ridge of Mt. Izta towards Pico de Orizaba

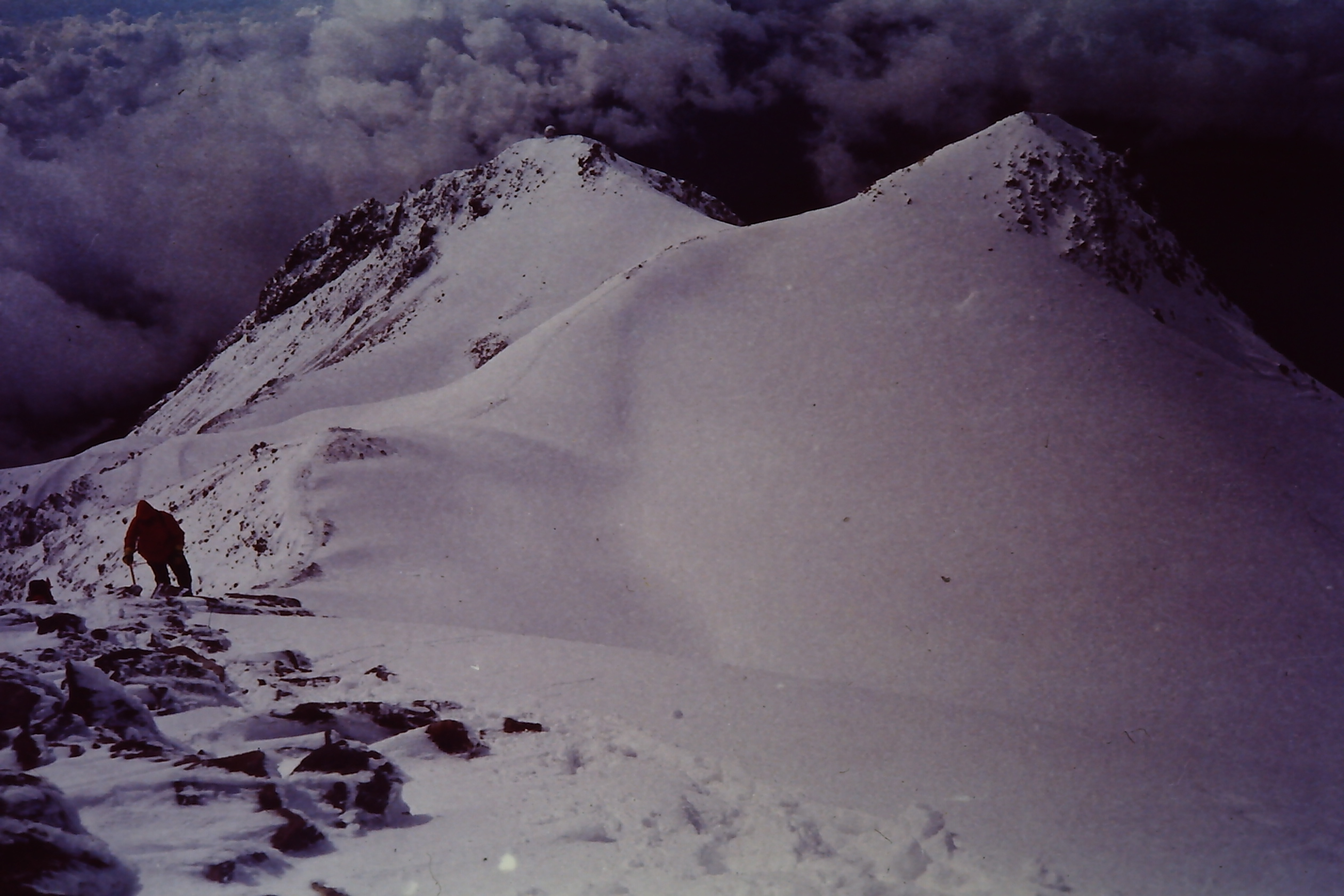
Iztaccihuatl Ridge after the mountain shelter

== See also ==
- List of mountain peaks of North America
  - List of mountain peaks of Mexico
    - List of volcanoes in Mexico
    - List of Ultras of Mexico
