= Llano Grande, State of Mexico =

Coordinates: 19.992°N 99.640°W

Llano Grande is a flat area among mountains in State of Mexico in Mexico. It is an old volcanic caldera. It is at latitude 19.9910661 degrees north, longitude 99.6458468 degrees west.
