= 21st federal electoral district of the State of Mexico =

Federal electoral district of Mexico

State of Mexico's 21st
- Electoral district of the Chamber of Deputies of Mexico

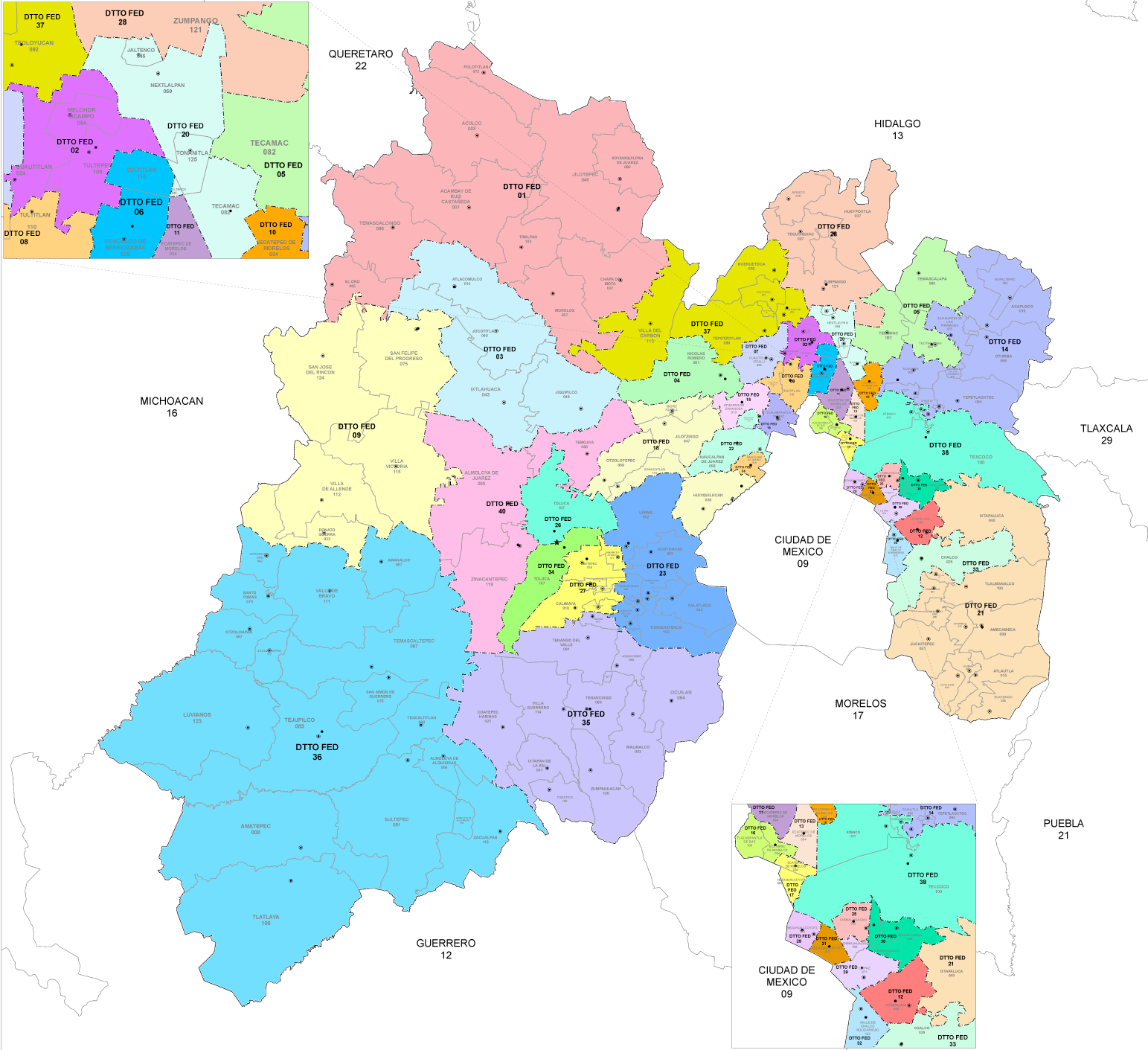
- State of Mexico's districts since 2023

Incumbent
- Member: Iván Millán Contreras
- Party: ▌Morena
- Congress: 66th (2024–2027)

District
- State: State of Mexico
- Head town: Amecameca de Juárez
- Coordinates: 19°45′N 99°10′W
- Covers: 12 municipalities: Amecameca, Atlautla, Ayapango, Cocotitlán, Ecatzingo, Ixtapaluca (part), Juchitepec, Ozumba, Temamatla, Tenango del Aire, Tepetlixpa, Tlalmanalco
- PR region: Fifth
- Precincts: 174
- Population: 410,835 (2020 census)

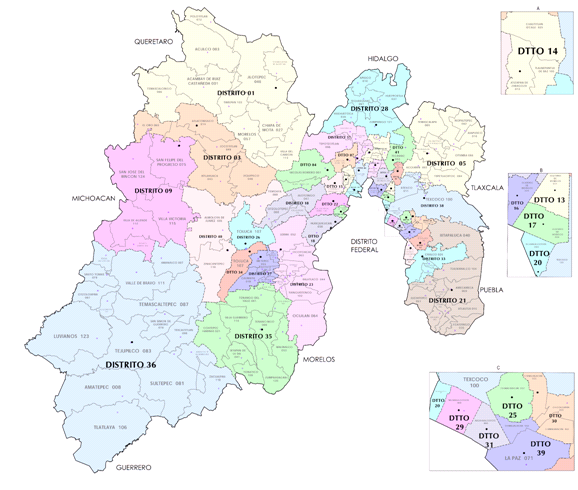
2017–2022 districting scheme

The 21st federal electoral district of the State of Mexico (Spanish: Distrito electoral federal 21 del Estado de México) is one of the 300 electoral districts into which Mexico is divided for elections to the federal Chamber of Deputies and one of 40 such districts in the State of Mexico.

It elects one deputy to the lower house of Congress for each three-year legislative session by means of the first-past-the-post system. Votes cast in the district also count towards the calculation of proportional representation ("plurinominal") deputies elected from the fifth region.

The 21st district was created by the 1977 electoral reforms, which increased the number of single-member seats in the Chamber of Deputies from 196 to 300. Under that plan, the State of Mexico's seat allocation rose from 15 to 34. The new districts were first contended in the 1979 mid-term election.

The current member for the district, elected in the 2024 general election, is Iván Millán Contreras of the National Regeneration Movement (Morena).

== District territory ==
Under the 2023 districting plan adopted by the National Electoral Institute (INE), which is to be used for the 2024, 2027 and 2030 federal elections, the 21st district is located in the state's eastern panhandle and covers 174 electoral precincts (secciones electorales) across 12 of its 125 municipalities:

- Amecameca, Atlautla, Ayapango, Cocotitlán, Ecatzingo, Juchitepec, Ozumba, Temamatla, Tenango del Aire, Tepetlixpa, Tlalmanalco and the eastern portion of Ixtapaluca. (Note: The remainder of Ixtapaluca votes in the 12th district.)

The head town (cabecera distrital), where results from individual polling stations are gathered together and tallied, is the city of Amecameca de Juárez. In the 2020 census, the district reported a total population of 410,835.

== Previous districting schemes ==
Evolution of electoral district numbers
	1974	1978	1996	2005	2017	2023
State of Mexico	15	34	36	40	41	40
Chamber of Deputies	196	300				

Under the previous districting plans enacted by the INE and its predecessors, the 21st district was situated as follows:

2017–2022

Ten municipalities in the eastern panhandle: Amecameca, Atlautla, Ayapango, Ecatzingo, Juchitepec, Ozumba, Tenango del Aire, Tepetlixpa, Tlamanalco and the eastern portion of Ixtapaluca. The head town was at Amecameca de Juárez.

2005–2017

A portion of the municipality of Naucalpan de Juárez.

1996–2005

The northern, north-eastern and western parts of Naucalpan de Juárez.

1978–1996

The municipalities of Acolman, Apaxco, Axapusco, Hueypoxtla, Jaltenco, Melchor Ocampo, Nextlalpan, Nopaltepec, San Martín de las Pirámides, Tecámac, Temascalapa, Teoloyucan, Teotihuacán, Tequixquiac, Tezoyuca, Tultepec and Zumpango, with its head town at Zumpango de Ocampo.

== Deputies returned to Congress ==
(Mexico) National parties
- Current
- PAN
- PRI
- PT
- PVEM
- MC
- Morena
- PAZ
- Somos
- Defunct or local only
- PLM
- PNR
- PRM
- PNM
- PP
- PPS
- PARM
- PFCRN
- CON
- PANAL
- PSD
- PES
- PES
- PRD

State of Mexico's 21st district
Election	Deputy	Party	Term	Legislature
1979	Alfredo Navarrete Romero	Institutional Revolutionary Party	1979–1982	51st Congress
1982	Hugo Díaz Thomé	Institutional Revolutionary Party	1982–1985	52nd Congress
1985	Pedro Zamora Ortiz	Institutional Revolutionary Party	1985–1988	53rd Congress
1988	Cecilio Barrera Reyes	Institutional Revolutionary Party	1988–1991	54th Congress
1991	Javier Barrios González	Institutional Revolutionary Party	1991–1994	55th Congress
1994	Leonel Domínguez Rivero	Institutional Revolutionary Party	1994–1997	56th Congress
1997	Héctor Flavio Valdez García	National Action Party (Mexico)	1997–2000	57th Congress
2000	Moisés Alcalde Virgen	National Action Party (Mexico)	2000–2003	58th Congress
2003	Manuel Gómez Morín Martínez del Río	National Action Party (Mexico)	2003–2006	59th Congress
2006	Edgar Olvera Higuera; María Eugenia Patiño Sánchez (Note: Patiño Sánchez, the alternate, was sworn in on 1 April 2009.)	National Action Party (Mexico)	2006–2009; 2009	60th Congress
2009	Rodrigo Reina Liceaga	Institutional Revolutionary Party	2009–2012	61st Congress
2012	Cristina Ruiz Sandoval	Institutional Revolutionary Party	2012–2015	62nd Congress
2015	Luis Gilberto Marrón Agustín; Jaime Mauricio Rojas Silva (Note: Rojas Silva, the alternate, was sworn in on 1 February 2018.)	National Action Party (Mexico)	2015–2018; 2018	63rd Congress
2018	Graciela Sánchez Ortiz	National Regeneration Movement	2018–2021	64th Congress
2021	Graciela Sánchez Ortiz	National Regeneration Movement	2021–2024	65th Congress
2024	Iván Millán Contreras	National Regeneration Movement	2024–2027	66th Congress

== Presidential elections ==
State of Mexico's 21st district
Election	District won by	Party or coalition	%
2018	Andrés Manuel López Obrador	Juntos Haremos Historia	60.5950
2024	Claudia Sheinbaum Pardo	Sigamos Haciendo Historia	68.1013
