= Amecameca Region =

Interstate region of Mexico

Region I (Spanish: Región 1. Amecameca) is an intrastate region within the State of Mexico, one of 16. It borders the states of Puebla and Morelos in the southeast corner of the state. The region comprises thirteen municipalities: Amecameca, Ayapango, Ecatzingo, Juchitepec, Tepetlixpa, Tlalmanalco. It is largely rural.

== Municipalities ==
- Amecameca
- Atlautla
- Ayapango
- Chalco
- Ecatzingo
- Juchitepec
- Temamatla
- Tenango del Aire
- Tepetlixpa
- Tlalmanalco
