= Ozumba =

Ozumba Ozumba 042
- Municipality
- Ozumba de Alzate
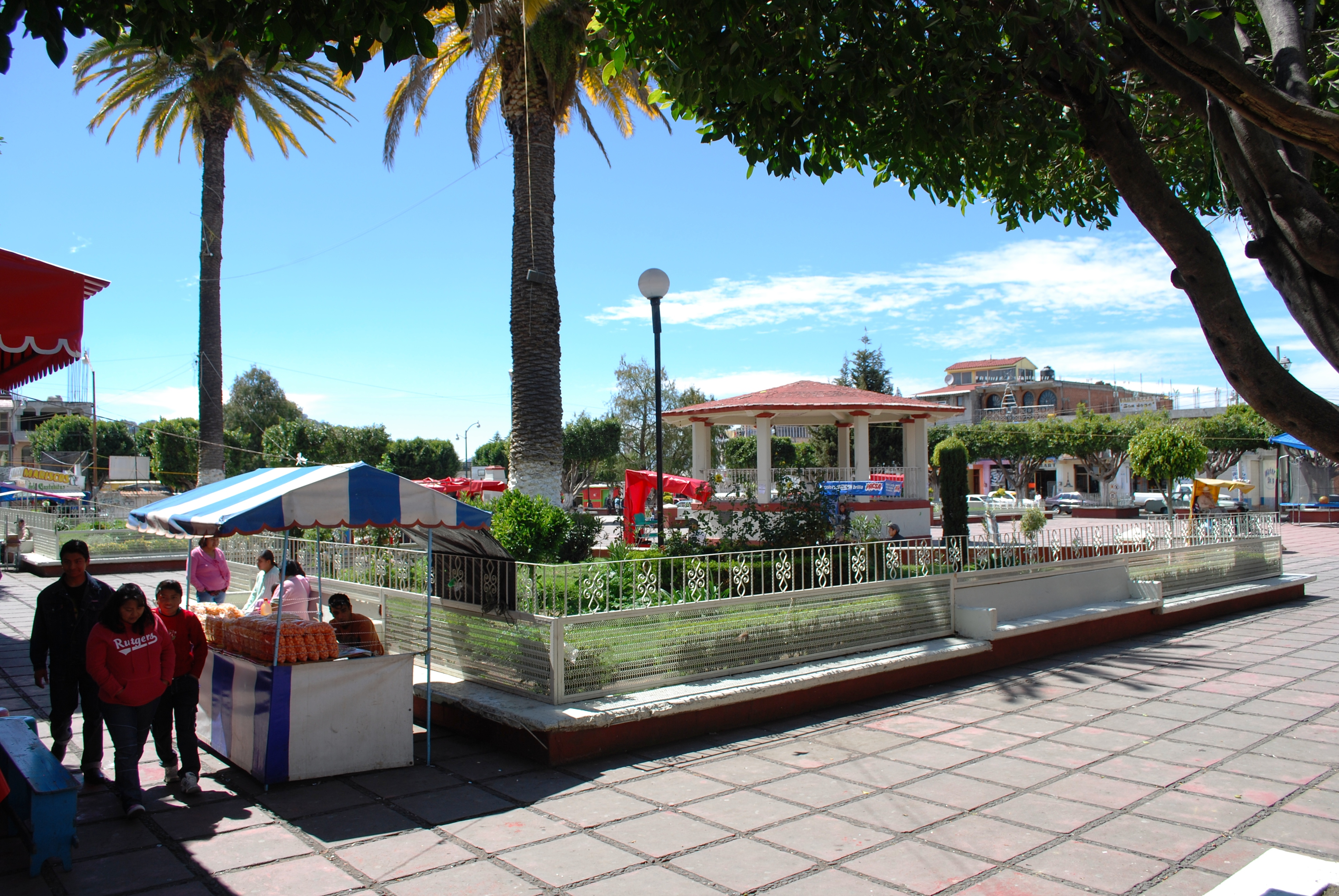
- Main Plaza

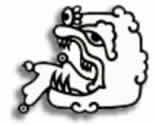
- Flag Coat of arms

- Location within Mexico Location within State of Mexico
- Coordinates: 19°02′21″N 98°47′37″W
- Country: Mexico
- State: State of Mexico
- Municipal Seat: Ozumba de Alzate
- Town Founded: 1525
- Municipality Founded: 1825

Government
  - Municipal President: Hugo González Cortés (2013-2015)
- Elevation (of seat): 2,340 m (7,680 ft)

Population (2010) Municipality
  - Municipality: 27,207
  - Seat: 15,717
- Time zone: UTC-6 (Central)
- Postal code (of seat): 56800
- Area code: 597
- Website: www.ozumba.gob.mx (in Spanish)

Ozumba is one of 125 municipalities in the State of Mexico. Its municipal seat is the town of Ozumba de Alzate. It is located in the southeast portion of the Valley of Mexico, 70 km southeast of Mexico City near the Mexico City-Cuautla highway. The main feature of this area is the Parish of the Immaculate Conception (Inmaculada Concepción) which began as a Franciscan monastery in the 16th century. The entrance to the cloister area contains murals related to the early evangelization efforts of this order. They include scenes such as Hernán Cortés greeting the first Franciscan missionaries in Mexico, the martyrdom of some of the first young converts to Christianity and even a scene where the monks are flogging Cortés. The church itself inside has suffered the theft of a number of its antique pieces. The name Ozumba comes from Nahuatl meaning "over the streams of water". "de Alzate" was added to the formal name in honor of the scientist José Antonio Alzate y Ramirez Santillana who was born here.

== History ==
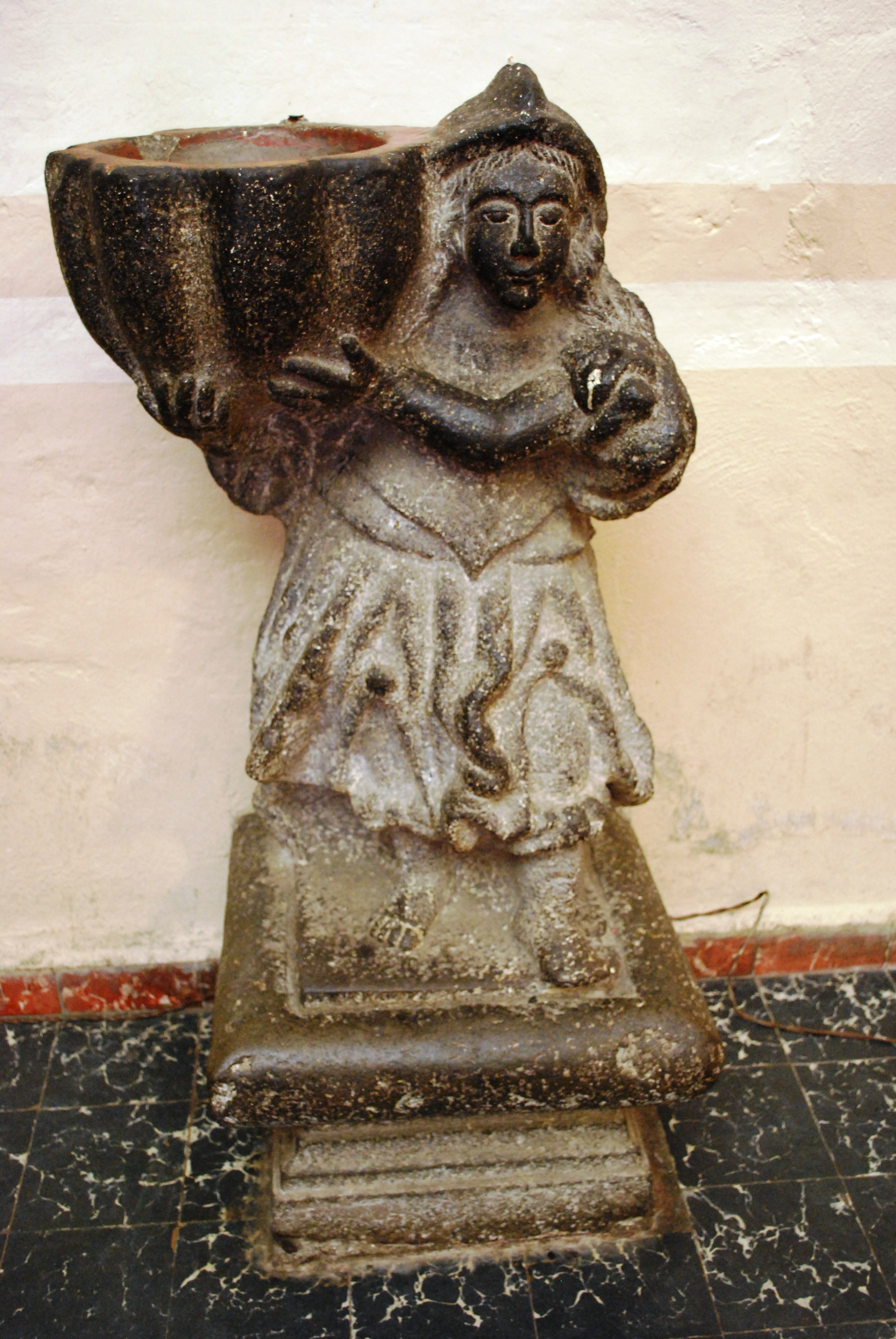
Font from the Ozumba church

The first human inhabitants were hunter-gatherers of various ethnicities. Later, the presence of the Olmecs helped to form the first sedentary agrarian societies. After this, the Nahua eventually became the dominant ethnicity. Most of these Nahuas were of the Xochimilca and Chichimeca tribes. By the 16th century, the area was firmly under the control of the Aztec Empire as a tributary province.

After arriving in the Valley of Mexico, the first Spanish crossed through here on their way to Tenochtitlan. The peoples here allied themselves with the Spanish in 1521 against the Aztecs, an alliance which allowed the people here to suffer less modification of their lifestyles than in other parts of early New Spain. However, this area remained a tributary province with tribute going to the Spanish instead of the Aztecs. The area was divided into encomenderos, but the natives maintained much of their communal farmland despite efforts by hacienda owners to confiscate them. During the colonial period, the main town in this area was Chimalhuacan, generally called Chimalhuacan-Chalco. The village of Ozumba was founded in 1525 by Francisco Atlanlzincuilzin, who was its first leader. Evangelization was done by the Franciscans at the end of the 16th century, when the monastery was most likely established here. The earliest parts of the building date from this time. The first formal church parish was established here in 1606, according to the first records of baptism, which dates from 1621. In this book, which extends to 1650, the baptisms of the indigenous are recorded in Nahuatl and those of the Europeans in Spanish.

Ozumba was under the religious jurisdiction of Tlalmanalco. The bishops and other administrators eventually ceased being monks, with these duties handed over to regular clergy. From 1773 to 1813, a large number of priests were assigned to the parish, with only two staying long term. During the Mexican War of Independence, Morelos’ success in Cuautla forced viceroy Felix Calleja to retreat to Ozumba with more than 200 wounded. After Independence and the erection of the State of Mexico, Ozumba became a municipality in 1825, when the area had about 4,000 inhabitants. "de Alzate" was added to the official name in 1879.

From 1860 to 1870, the area was plagued by a bandit group known as Los Plateados. The first train arrived in 1882, connecting Ozumba with the outside world, especially Cuautla and Mexico City. This contact resulted in the replacement of Nahuatl with Spanish as the dominant language. During the Mexican Revolution, Ozumba was on the border of lands controlled by the government and those controlled by the rebels, leading to significant violence here, including the derailment of the train by Zapatista troops. Ozumba remained mostly in government hands, but the Zapatistas attacked frequently, capturing it for brief periods on two occasions. The violence ended in 1917, and the town has been mostly quiet since. The original municipal palace was demolished in the 1950s and replaced with the current one. The municipal market was constructed in the 1970s. Violence returned to the town when gunmen, presumably from "La Familia Michoacana" drug cartel, shot up municipal president Luis Alfredo Galicia Arrieta's house in the town in the middle of the night in December 2009.

== The town ==
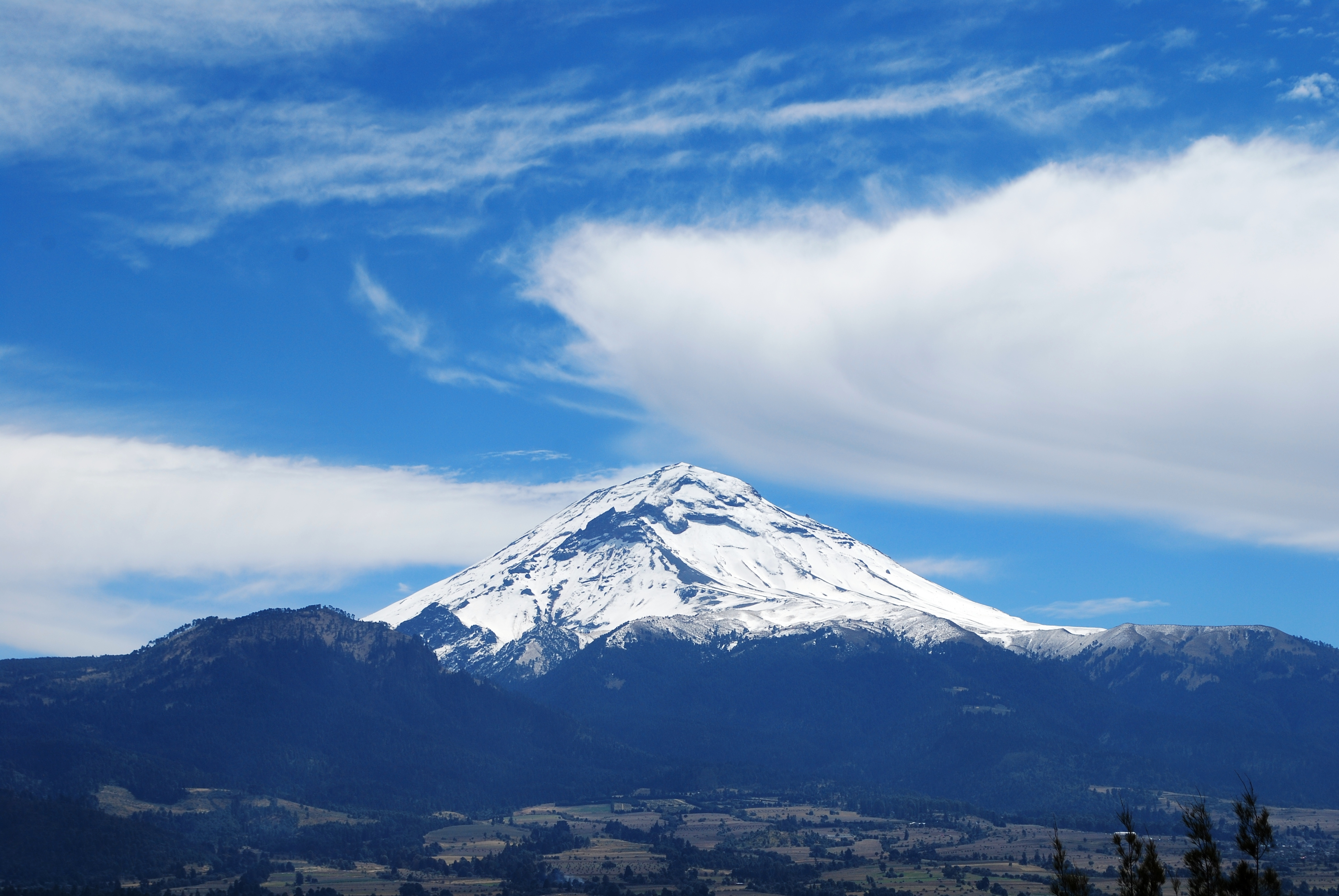
View of Popocatepetl

The town of Ozumba is located on Fed 115 south of Amecameca. It is part of the "Volcano Route" (a tourism promotion of the State of Mexico) which includes the municipalities of Chalco, Tlalmanalco, Amecameca and Nepantla. The town and municipality experience ash and small quakes from the Popocatépetl volcano from time to time. For this reason, it is one of the 20 communities near the active volcano subject to emergency evacuation procedures in the event of an eruption. These procedures affect 60,000 people in fourteen municipalities in Mexico State alone. The town has narrow streets whose layout dates back to the colonial era. The main plaza is a simple layout with an open area for concerts and other events and a kiosk of simple design. It is surrounded by stands offering street food such as tacos and quesadillas. However most of the town's activity focuses on the Nuestra Senora de la Inmaculada Concepcion Church with its large atrium. Many come here to rest, and children are allowed to play in the area as well as to see the murals painted in the side entrance.

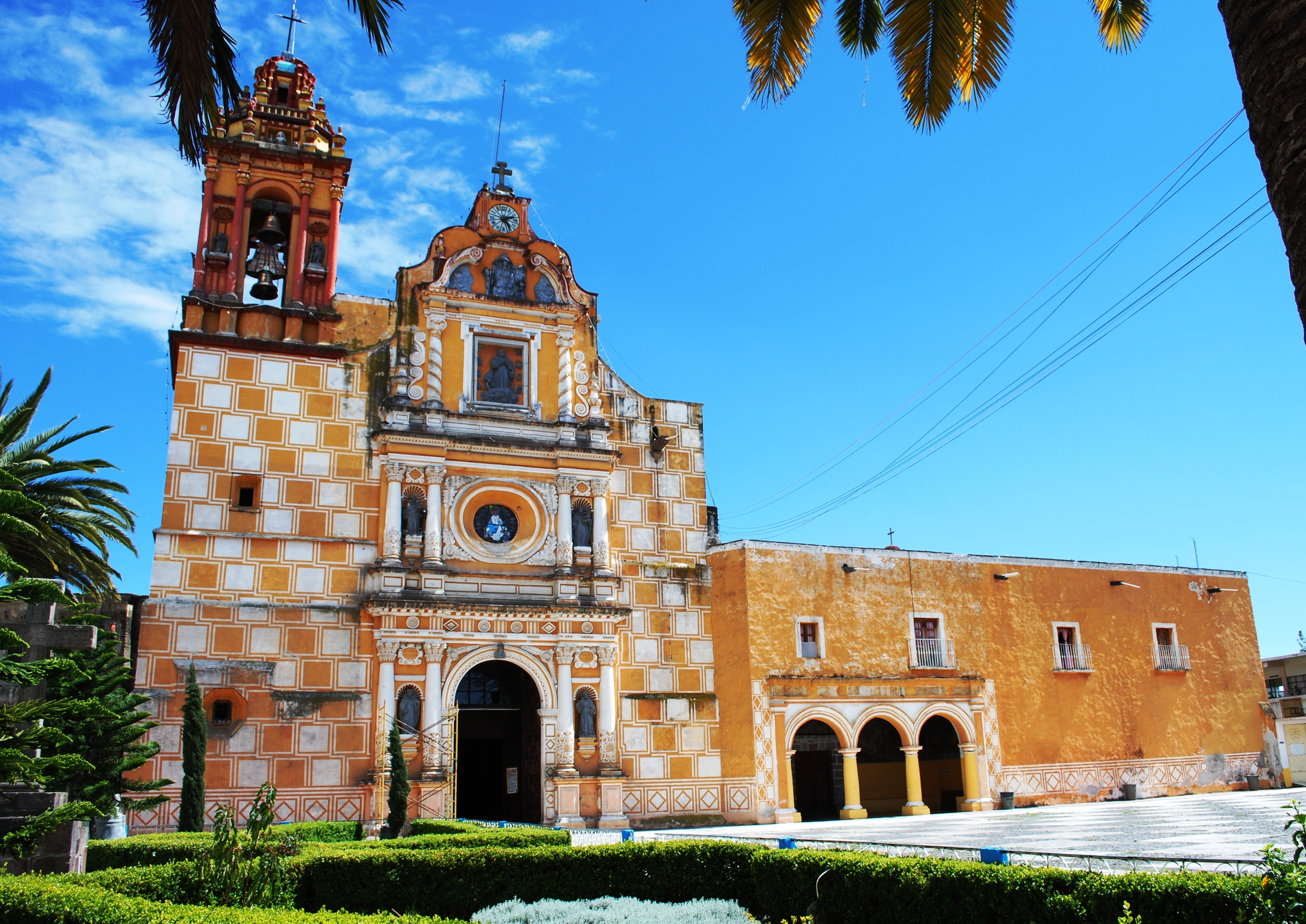
Facade of the church

The Church of Nuestra Señora de la Inmaculada Conception began as a Franciscan monastery established in the 16th century. Only the side entrance and columns of the church date from the 16th century. The rest, including the church, dates from the 17th century to the early 18th century. This latter construction was due to the dilapidated condition of the original church, which was rebuilt, starting in 1696. The tower was constructed in 1717 by architects Juan Perez and Juan Ventura. Baptismal records indicate that this monastery church became the parish church of the area in the 17th century.

The facade has undergone some changes since it was first built. Today, it consists of three bodies crowned by a crest. In the first two bodies there are images between the columns. The third body is decorated with a stone image of the Virgin Mary. The crest contains in image of God, the Father looking down on those entering the church with hands spread in blessing. The tower contains stone and plaster decorative elements.

The two main features are the main altarpieces and the high choir on the right hand side. This is one of the few of its kind remaining in Mexico and it is completely made of intricately carved wood.

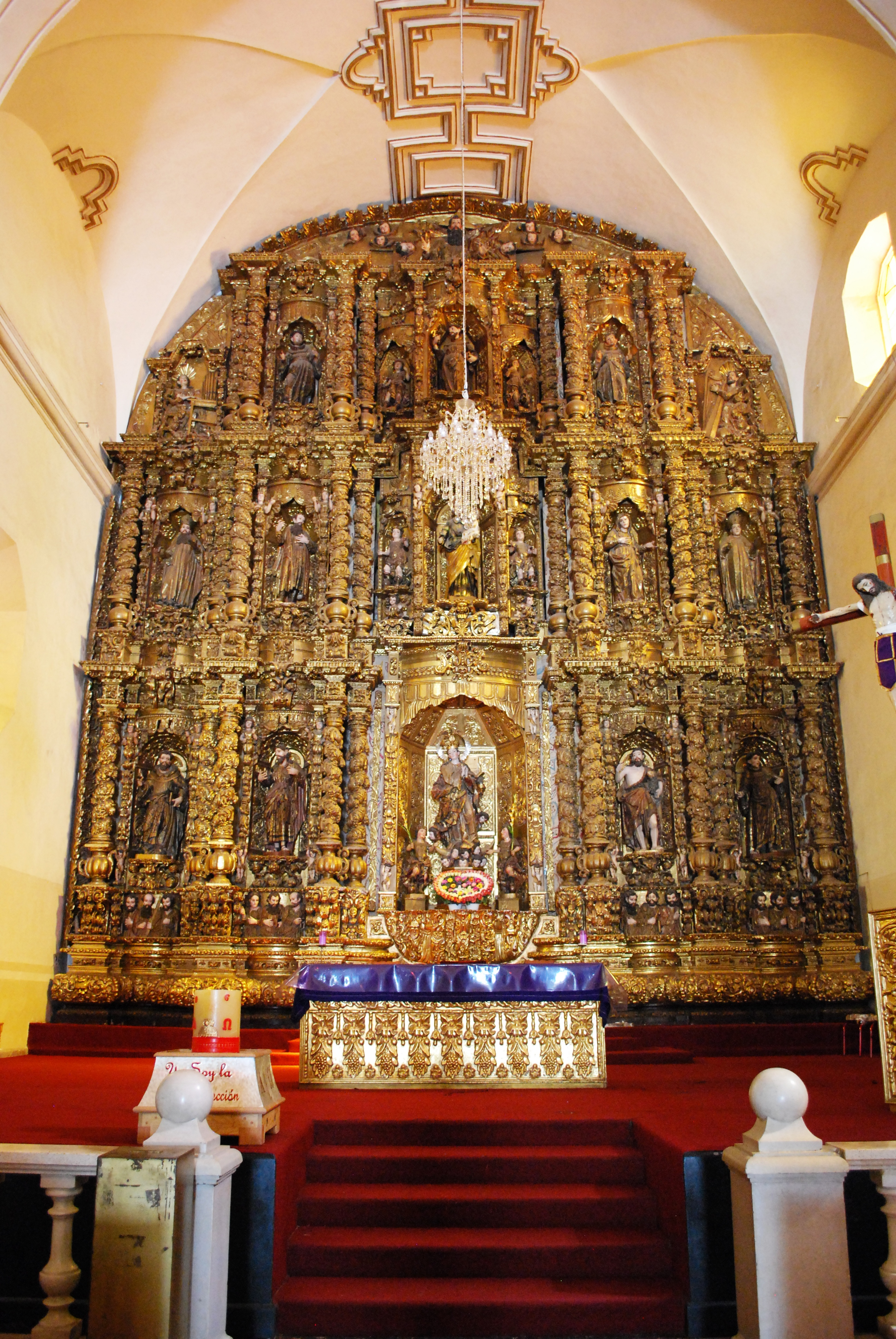
Main altar

The main altarpiece completely covers the wall behind the main altar. The center part was cut out and replaced by a Neoclassical one. Its restoration to a more original appearance is relatively recent and based on research by the INAH to determine what it probably looked like. In the center of the altarpiece is an image of the Immaculate Conception, surrounded by images of the saints associated with the life of the Virgin Mary as well as Franciscan friars such as Anthony of Padua, Diego de Acala Obispo, Francis of Assisi and Bernardino of Siena and others such as Saint Dominic and Augustine of Hippo. Two sculptures are missing... those of Saint Cecilia and King David due to theft. Although extremely ornate, this piece is considered to be part of the "sober" Baroque tradition. The entire altarpiece is gilded and the main feature is the repeating Solomonic Baroque columns.

Other colonial altarpieces in various styles line the nave and stand in the side chapels, some with paintings by well known Mexican artists such as Juan Correa and the Arellano family. The altarpiece of the Passion of Christ was begun in 1741. Its sculpting was finished in 1746 and was gilded between 1749 and 1753. It was originally dedicated to Jesus the Nazarene until the 19th century. This sculpture was then moved to the second body. There used to be seven archangels here but only two remain.

The Chapel of the Third Order has a more traditional altarpiece, with two bodies approachable from three sides. It contains niches, some of which are now empty. These contained images such as those of San Hugo and the Immaculate Conception. The altarpiece was done by a sculptor named Domingo and contains two of his paintings. At the top are paintings done by someone named Arellano. Some aspects of the altars are modern such as the statue of Thérèse de Lisieux. Originally, there was a statue of Anthony of Padua here.

Unfortunately, this church, along with a number of others in the area, has suffered the theft of artwork. This have included statues of saints, altar items and paintings such as "The Transit of the Virgin" which was stolen in the 1990s.

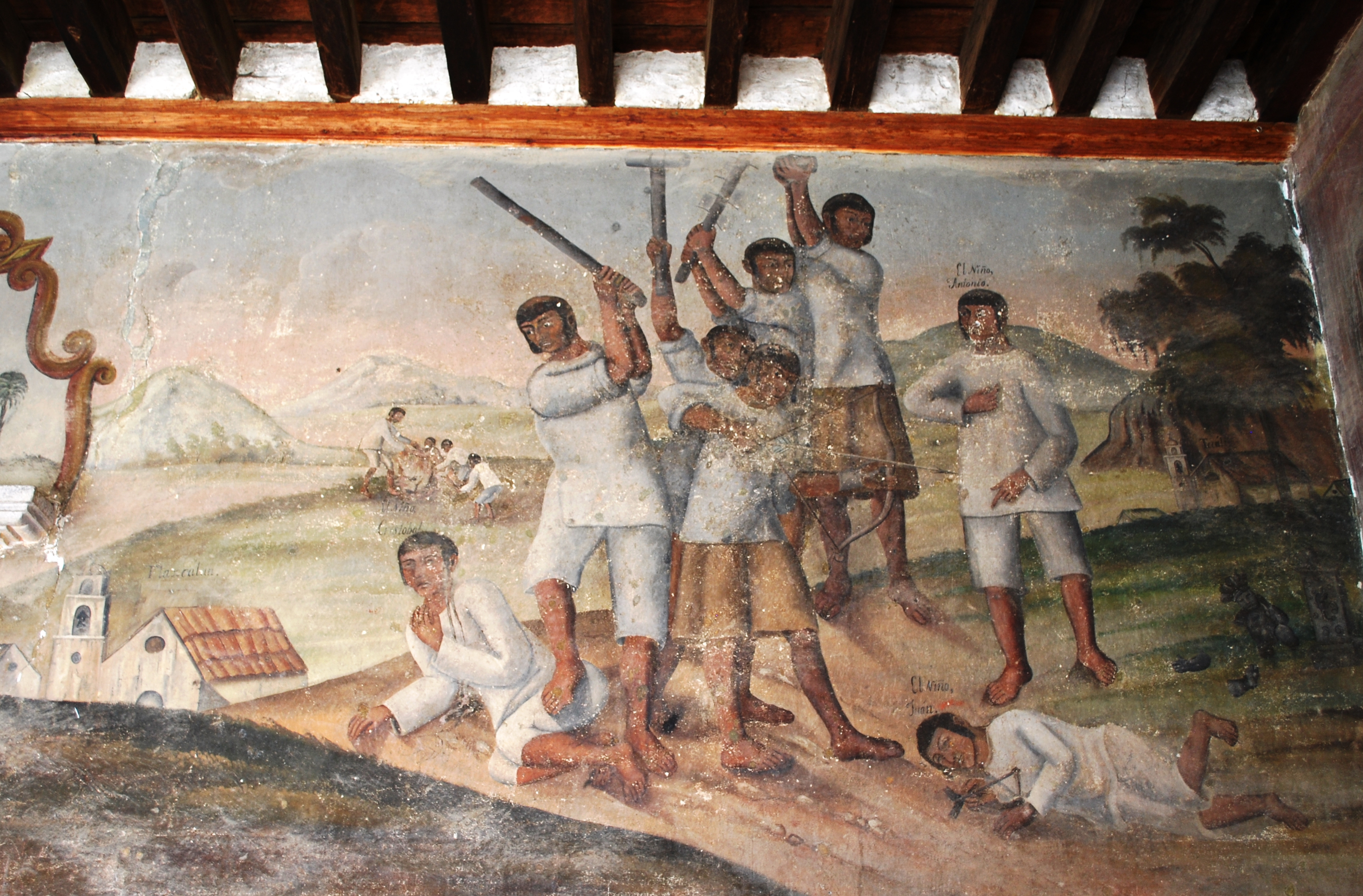
Mural of the "Martyred Children"

The monastery area is to the right of the church. The main entrance is a "portería" or an arched, colonnaded entry. Inside this portería are murals depicting scenes from the early evangelization efforts by the Franciscans in Mexico. It has been theorized that this portería originally served as the monastery's chapel and where evangelization efforts were concentrated. This would explain the six major scenes which are depicted on the walls. These murals are all that is left of the monastery's original decoration from the 16th century. The murals were retouched in the mid 19th century. They are one of the earliest examples of Rubens motif in the New World and contain one of the very few depictions of Peter of Ghent.

On the left hand side is a depiction of Hernán Cortés greeting the arrival of the first twelve Franciscan monks to arrive to Tenochtitlan-Mexico City. These friars had walked barefoot from Veracruz on the Gulf coast, 250 to the east. Cortés greets them on the causeway leading into the city as the head of a retinue of conquistadors and high ranking Aztec nobles. The Aztecs show surprise when Cortés and the other Spaniards bow to the monks.

To the right of the main door is a depicted of the "Niños Mártires" or child martyrs of Tlaxcala. According to the story, in 1527, Axotecatl, one of the four lords of Tlaxcala, sent his sons to be educated by the Franciscans. Then the boys returned, they had converted to Christianity and began to smash native idols and scolding their father for his polygamy and drinking. The lord beat one son, who the Spaniards named Cristobal, and then burned him to death. The other two boys fled but continued to preach until they met a martyr's fate. This scene not only shows martyrdom but also shows how the Franciscans invested in childhood education and even suggests that they may have loved the boys more than their own parents. To the far right is a relative rare scene of Cortés being flagellated, which depicts a story from Texcoco. According to the story, an Indian missed mass and was punished by public flogging, prompting an angry response from the native community. To pacify the situation, Cortés arranged with the friars to arrive late to Mass and to receive the flogging in front of the natives. The idea was to show that the punishment was impartial. However, the Franciscans also viewed Cortés flogging as voluntary and as a sign of his piety. The depiction has two messages, one of the special relationship between the Church and the Spaniards as well as the acceptance of public punishment.

Above the doorframe is an image of Francis of Assisi holding three globes that support an image of Mary Immaculate as María de Ágreda writes the Mystical city of God and Duns Scotus writes a defense of the doctrine of the Immaculate Conception. This image would appear in later monasteries such as the Mission Landa in the Sierra Gorda of Querétaro, at a college in Zacatecas and another college in Mexico City.

Although most are (semi) abandoned and not restored for tourists, the town has a number of other architectural and historic sites. The abandoned train station is on the Mexico City-Cuautla section of the Ferrocarril Interocianico (Inter-Ocean Railway) which connected Acapulco with Veracruz. The station was built in 1895. Casa de Cultura José A. Alzate has temporary art and other exhibits as well as classes in dance, painting, music, theater and other arts. It is named after Jose Antonio de Alzate y Ramirez Santillana, who was baptized here in 1737. He was a scientist with influence in the social, political and economic fields during the intellectual movement of Mexico in the 18th century. The scientist's childhood home is also located here. Colonial era constructions include the Juan Rulfo house, the Casa de la Nueva York and the Chapel of San Francisco, one of the oldest churches in the municipality. Rodolfo Ortega house is representative of the architectural style of the municipality. The municipal market is located on the main road in front of the church. It is a typical rural market of Mexico State selling basic necessities such as foods, seed, grain and even cattle. Particularly during the rainy season, this market, as well as many others in the area, also offers up to 90 species of edible wild mushrooms. These are most often sold by older women in areas just outside the market building. The value of mushrooms in this region of Mexico helps to maintain traditional ethnobiological knowledge. The most common prepared food items sold in the food stalls are barbacoa and moronga, a type of blood sausage prepared in various ways.

Principal festivities here is the Feast of the Nuestra Señora de la Inmaculada Concepcion on 8 December, the anniversary of the municipality on 23 June and the Festival of the Gremios on 15 August. On feast days, traditional dances include Concheros, Moros y Cristianos and Marotas.

There is one institution of higher education located here called the Universidad Alzate de Ozumba.

== The municipality ==
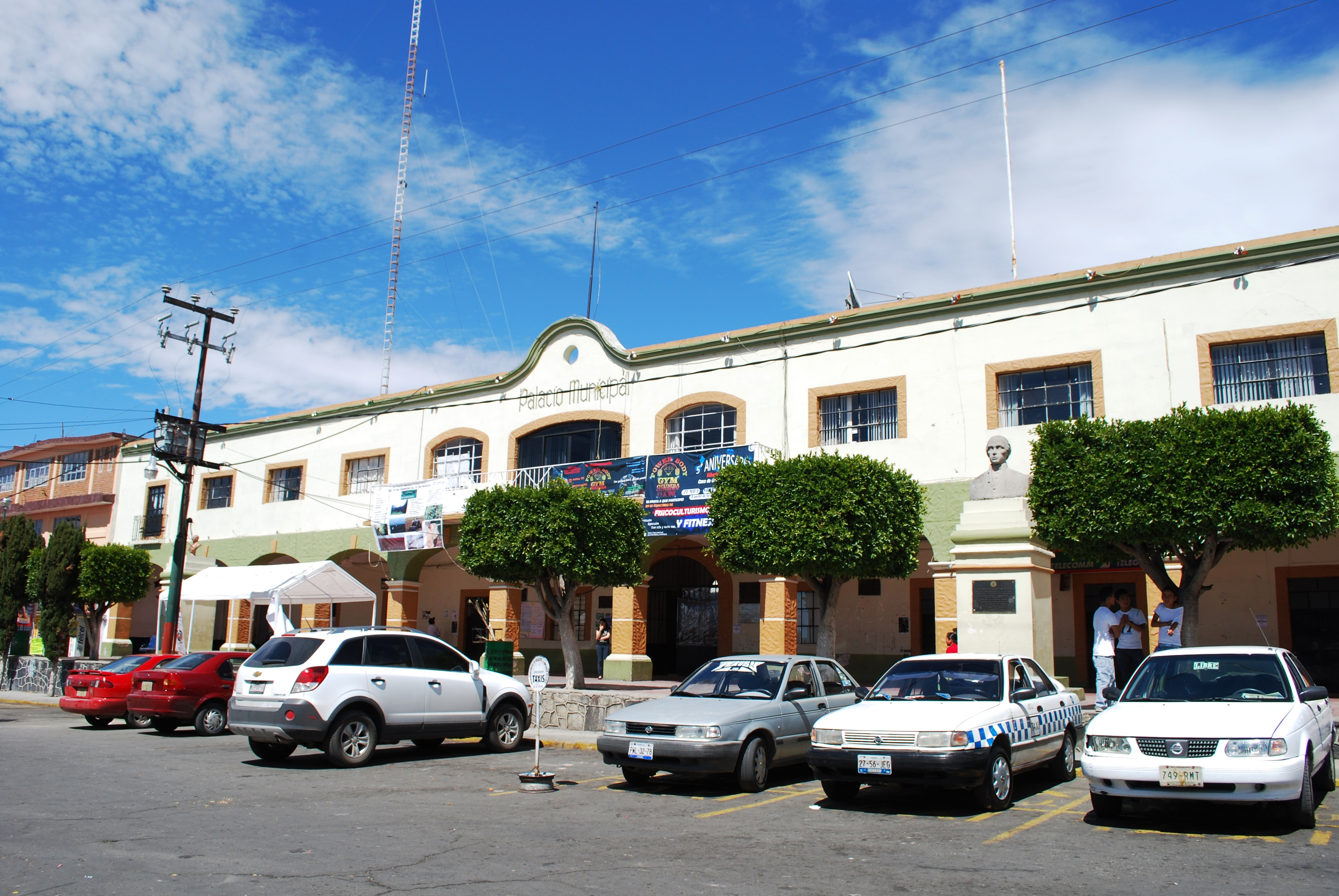
Municipal palace

As municipal seat, the town of Ozumba is the governing authority for thirteen other named communities. Together the municipality has a total population of 24,055 (2005) over 65% of which lives in the town proper. The municipality covers a territory of 48.92km2. It is bordered by Ayapango, Amecameca, Atlautla, Tepetlixpa and Juchitepec as well as to the south by the state of Morelos. The most important geographical feature of the area is the Popocatepetl volcano although it lies outside of the municipality proper. Much of the land here was tempered by past lava flows. The town is surrounded by many ravines and the municipality's territory is very rugged. The ravines are formed by small streams, whose water flows and swirls into spirals. This is what gives the area its name. Most ravines align northeast to southwest. The highest elevation is the Xoyacan Mountain which separates it from Amecameca and Ayapango. Another major elevation is the Chimal or Huilotepec Mountain which also forms part of its border, separating it from Tepetlixpa. The Cuautepec Mountain separates the municipality from the state of Morelos. Between the town of Ozumba and Chimalhuacan there is a small elevation which is locally known as the Cerrito (small mountain) and it is one of the few elevations in the center of the municipality. The only natural surface water is found in ravines and springs. The most notable ravines are called the Tlapunatlaco, the San Bartolo, and the San Francisco. The north and central parts of the municipality have a temperate climate (C(w2) (w) b(i)g), while the lower southern part has a somewhat warmer climate (A) C(w2) (w) a(i´)). Most of the wild vegetation here is pine and oak forest, which has been heavily exploited by man. Fauna includes armadillo, cacomixtle), rabbits, bobcats, bats, skunks, hummingbirds, doves, butterflies, scorpions and spiders.

Sixty five percent of the land here is used for agriculture with most of the rest being developed. Some of the main crops are produced in family orchards and include walnuts, capulins, avocados, Mexican hawthorns, peaches, apricots, apples, and others. A number of commercial flowers and medicinal plants are also grown here. Agriculture is still the most important economic activity, with some livestock and some logging done at the foothills of the Popocatepetl volcano. The only industry is small workshops which produce farm implements, saddles, fireworks and boots. Despite agriculture's importance, just under half the municipality's population is engaged in commerce.

The municipality has two main attractions, a variety of natural areas and parks and its architectural heritage consisting of early colonial churches and monasteries completed before the end of the 17th century. The community of San Mateo Tecalco has both. The largest park Parque Olla and there are year-round fresh water springs at Pozas de Santa Maria. It also has one of the oldest churches in the municipality. Just south of the municipal seat is the community of San Vicent Chimalhuacan, which is often called Chimalhuacan-Chalco or just simply Chimal. Natural attractions here include the Parque El Salto with its small waterfall, gardens and caves located just west of the Dominican monastery. This area is popular with local tourists despite the lack of facilities. Another natural area is the Parque La Herradura, which is a forested area in the foothills of the Popocatepetl volcano. The most important architectural attraction here is the former Dominican monastery which dates from the 16th century. It has a wide church with thick buttresses. The main entrance is sculpted in sandstone containing the coats of arms of Castilla and of the Dominican order. The complex overall is a mix of Moorish and Plateresque styles. A plaque states that Sor Juana Inés de la Cruz was baptized here in 1651 although she was really baptized in 1648. The baptismal font dates from 1542. This church has been converted into a cultural center due to the annual celebrations held here to commemorate the birth of Sor Juana Inés de la Cruz. The parish church for the community is the Church of San Vicente Ferrer which was once the richest church in the municipality. Today it has a small archeological museum containing carved stone, ceramics, clay figures, utensils and more from the pre-Hispanic era. The Arco de los Conejos and Los Guardias are colonial era monuments marking the entrance to San Vicente Chimalhuacan.

One good idea and recomendación is to be helped by experts in the area. Some of them offer very affordable exclusive promotions for "pueblear" in Mexico. They can help you with ideas, tips and destinations that are fun, interesting and at the same time secure for all the family. There are options such as Puebleando ando that is specialized in town tourism through Mexico and can very helpful when traveling to the country.

There are a number of other attractions in the more rural areas of the municipality. The Pozas del Alvaresco and the Pozas de Atzinco are natural springs which emit water during the rainy season. The Hacienda de Actopan is located just east of the town and is available to rent for functions. The Hacienda de Actempan is located east of the town and is semi abandoned. The Puente de los Aztecs is a pre-Hispanic era bridge located in a rural area of the municipality.
