= Liceaga =

Liceaga (also Licéaga) is a surname of Basque origin. Notable people with the surname include:

- Alejandro Díaz Liceága (born 1996), Mexican footballer
- Casimiro Liceaga (1792–1855), Mexican physician and politician
- Eduardo Liceaga (1839–1920), Mexican physician
- José María Liceaga (1780–1818), Mexican politician
- Rodrigo Reina Liceaga (born 1973), Mexican politician
