= Edgar Olvera Higuera =

Mexican politician

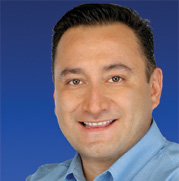
- Olvera in 2009
- Born: 20 April 1969 (age 57); Naucalpan, State of Mexico, Mexico
- Education: Instituto Tecnológico y de Estudios Superiores de Monterrey LAE: Licenciado en Administración de Empresas (1987-1992)
- Occupations: Presidente Municipal Constitucional de Naucalpan de Juárez, Estado de México. 2016-2018.
- Political party: PAN
- Spouse: Liliana Carbajal de Olvera
- Children: Four daughters

Edgar Armando Olvera Higuera (born 20 April 1969) is a Mexican politician affiliated with the National Action Party (PAN).

In the 2006 general election, he was elected to the Chamber of Deputies to represent the State of Mexico's 21st district during the 60th session of Congress.

In 2016, he was elected mayor of Naucalpan, a city and municipality located just northwest of Mexico City, for a three-year term (2016–2018). In March 2018, he was granted a permanent leave of absence from his position as mayor by local Congress in order to run in the 2018 election for the state's 29th local district.
