= Juchitepec =

- Municipality
- Coat of arms

- Location in Mexico
- Coordinates: 19°05′59″N 98°52′45″W
- Country: Mexico
- State: State of Mexico

Area
  - Municipality: 149.56 km^{2} (57.75 sq mi)
- Elevation at seat: 2,531 m (8,304 ft)

Population (2010)
  - Municipality: 23,497
  - Urban: 22,284
- Time zone: UTC-6 (Central Standard Time)

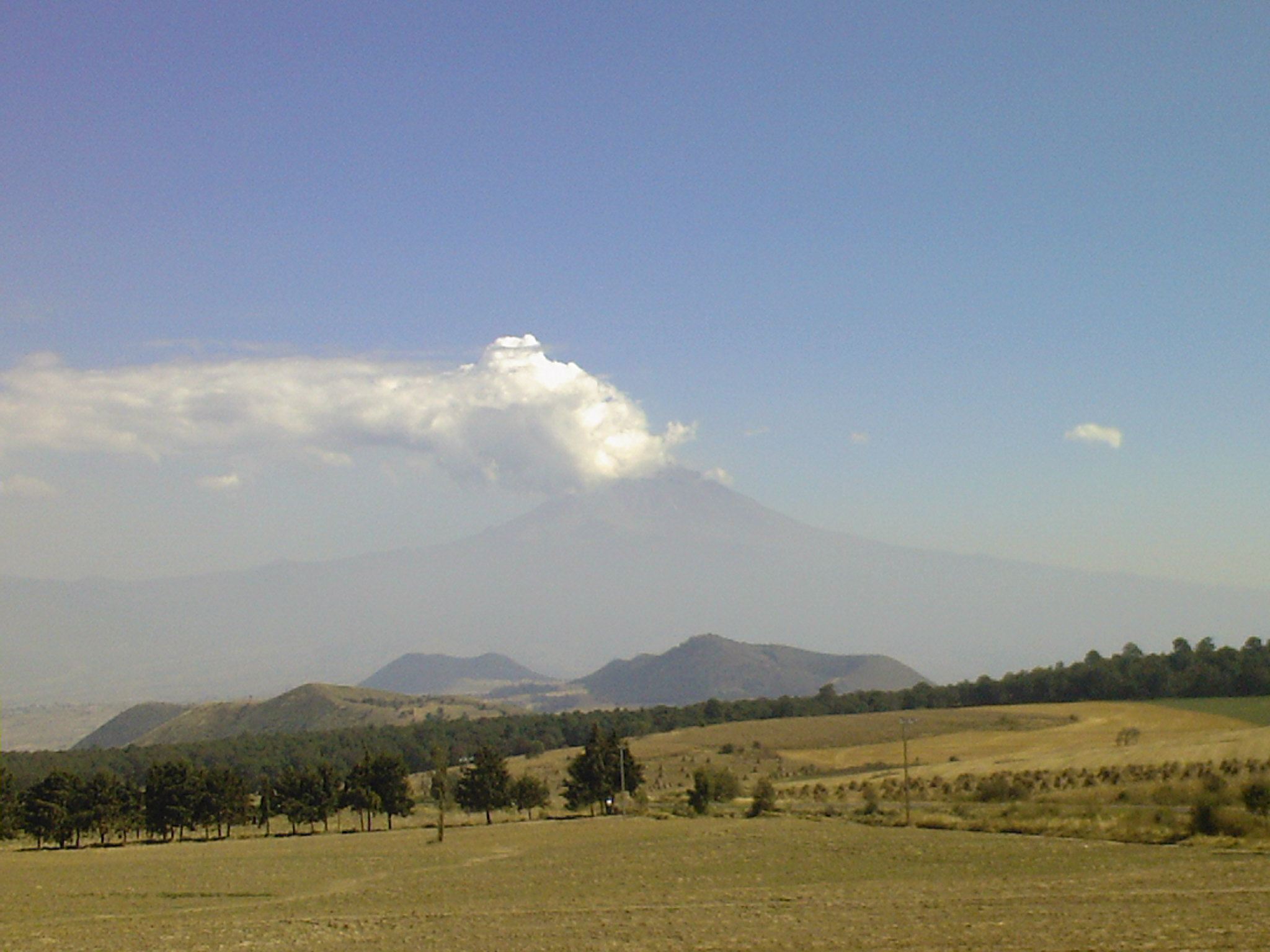
The nearby Popocatépetl volcano

Juchitepec is a municipality in State of Mexico in central Mexico. The municipal seat is the city of Juchitepec de Mariano Rivas. Juchitepec means “Hill of the Flowers” in Nahuatl. The municipality covers an area of 149.56 km^{2}. It has one major community outside the seat called San Matias Cuijingo. The municipality is located at the southwest of the state, and borders the municipalities of Tenango del Aire, Tepetlixpa, Ozumba and Ayapango in the State of Mexico, and with Totolapan and Tlalnepantla in the state of Morelos to the south, and the borough of Milpa Alta in Mexico City to the west. A large part of the population is employed in commerce. Other major economic activities include agriculture and livestock. As of the 2010 census, the municipality had a total population of 23,497 inhabitants.

== Towns and villages ==
The largest localities (cities, towns, and villages) are:

Name	2010 Census Population
Juchitepec de Mariano Rivapalacio	16,021
San Matías Cuijingo	6,263
Camino a la Mina	287
Colonia Techachal	157
Barrio Santa Rosa de Lima	122
La Loma	122
La Garita	114
Total Municipality	23,497

== History ==
Juchitepec (Xochiltepetl) was founded in 1381 by a ruler named Acamapixtli. In pre-Hispanic times, the Olmec lived in the zone. Juchitepec was one of the first places conquered by the Spanish because it was on the route Hernán Cortés took when he arrived. On July 3, 1531, a decree was written which defined Juchitepec's eight districts: Cuautzozongo, Calayuco, Zancalco, Oacalco, Tetlancheo, Tepepatlacher, Tlacotlapilco and Tlacaelcalpam. On May 2, 1880, Juchitepec was elevated to the rank of town. The Mexican Revolution impacted Juchitepec because in 1911 some of the first Zapatista groups entered and demanded money from the rich. Some years later Juchitepec attained infrastructure like plumbing and electricity. Today there is a library and a cultural center.

== Cultural and tourist attractions ==
Juchitepec is in an isolated location. However, thanks to the beauty of its streets and gardens, it has been the setting of several movies and commercials. In the center of town is the Church of Santo Domingo that was built in the Baroque style. Juchitepec does not have a native dance, but in its two biggest parties, the traditional dances are "The Dance of Moors and Christians" and chinelos, originating in Morelos. The typical food of Juchitepec is mole, barbecue, chicken or calf mixiote and carnitas prepared in a special way, popcorn, cheese tamales, rajas and corn and bean tlacoyos. The traditional drink is the tecui.
