= Tlalmanalco =

- Municipality
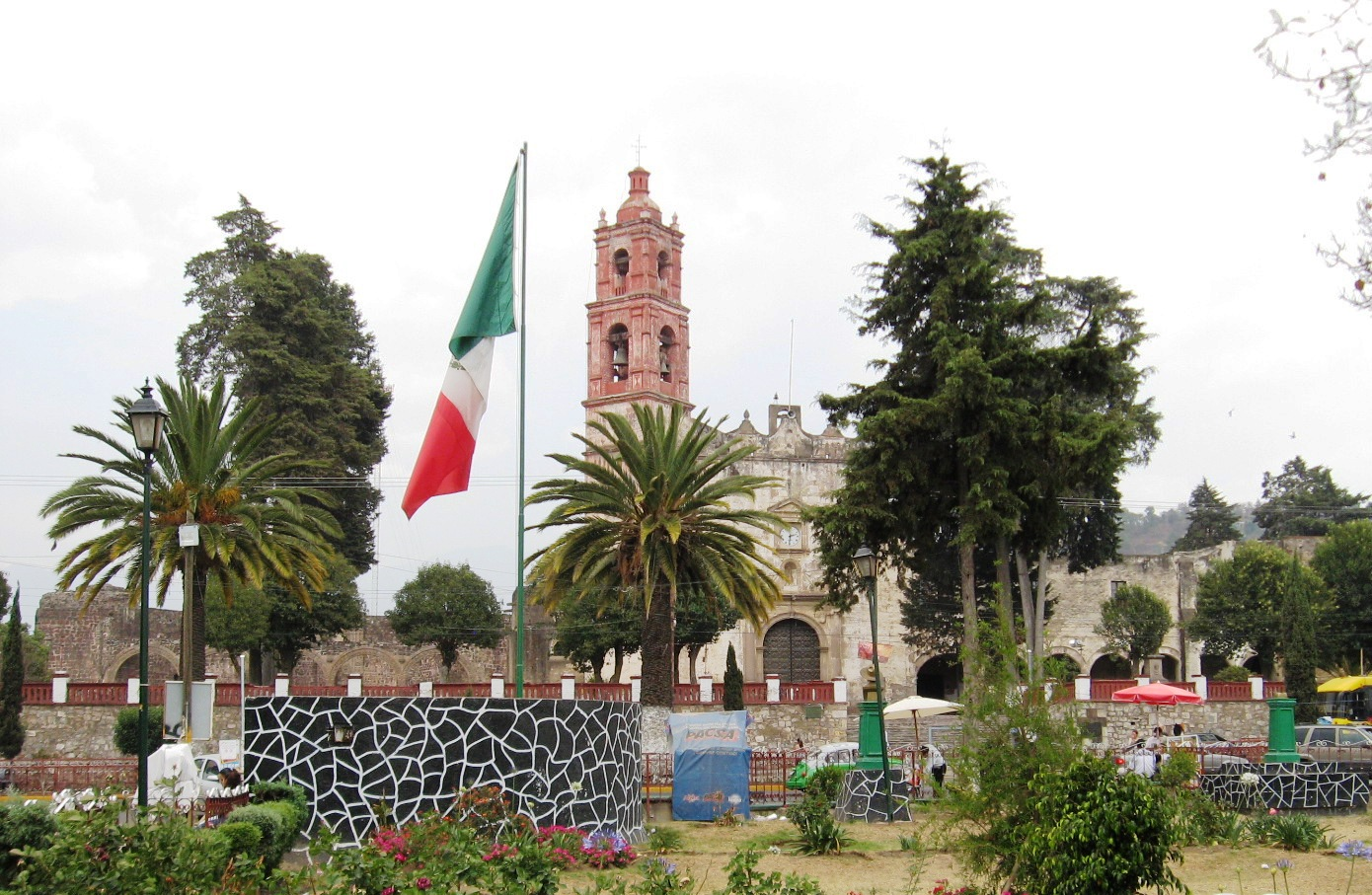

- Coat of arms

- Location within Mexico
- Coordinates: 19°12′16″N 98°48′09″W
- Country: Mexico
- State: State of Mexico
- Municipal Seat: Tlalmanalco de Velázquez
- Town Founded: 1336
- Municipality Created: 1821

Government
  - Municipal President: Rubén Reyes Cardoso 2013-2015
- Elevation (of seat): 2,400 m (7,900 ft)

Population (2010) Municipality
  - Municipality: 46,130
  - Seat: 14,664
- Time zone: UTC–06:00 (Zona Centro)
- Postal code (of seat): 56700
- Area code: 597
- Website: (in Spanish) / www.tlalmanalco.com/

Tlalmanalco is a municipality located in the far south-eastern part of the State of Mexico. The municipal seat and second largest town in the municipality is the town of Tlalmanalco de Velázquez The name is from the Nahuatl language, meaning “flat area.” The municipality's seal shows flat land, with a pyramid on it, representing its pre-Hispanic history, surrounded by small mountains, which is how the area was represented in Aztec codices. The municipality is bordered by the municipalities of Chalco, Ixtapaluca, Cocotitlan, Temamatla, Tenango del Aire, Ayapango and Amecameca. It also shares a border with the neighboring state of Puebla. Much of the municipality borders the Iztaccihuatl-Popocatepetl National Park. For this reason, Iztaccihuatl volcano dominates the landscape. The town has been designated as a “Pueblo con Encanto” (Town with Charm) by the government of the State of Mexico.

== History ==
According to archeological findings, there was a village stronghold in the area from about 3,100 to 600 B.C. The archeological zone is located just to the northwest of the main plaza of the town. Groups such as the Xochteca, Cocolca, Olmec-Xicallanca and Quiyahuizteca populated the area between the 10th and 13th centuries. However, these groups were later driven from here by the Toltecs and the Chichimecas. A subgroup of these two tribes, called the Nonohualcas, arrived to the area in the 13th century and formed a city-state in what is now Tlalmanalco in 1336. This city-state formed an alliance with ethnically-related populations such as those in Amaquemecan, Chimalhuacan and Tenango Tepopollan. This area was one of the last to be conquered by the Aztecs, but after 100 years of fighting, the alliance succumbed in 1465.

The founding of the Spanish town occurred in 1525 by Friar Juan de Rivas, the same year that evangelization of the native population was begun by Friar Martin de Valencia. The Annals of Chimalpain indicate that the indigenous shrine here was destroyed in 1525, and a church and open-air chapel were consecrated in 1532 even though the chapel was never completed. Tlalmanalco suffered the forced indentured servitude of the native population from 1550 to 1633, when this practice was abolished.

Attempts to industrialize the rural, farming economy began in 1858, when a copper smelting operation and various textile mills were introduced, as well as a railroad line. One of the more important factories by the turn of the century was the San Rafael y Anexas, S.A. paper mill, located in the nearby village of San Rafael. This mill elevated the area economically, and was considered one of the most important industries in Mexico from 1930 to 1970.

== Notable sites ==
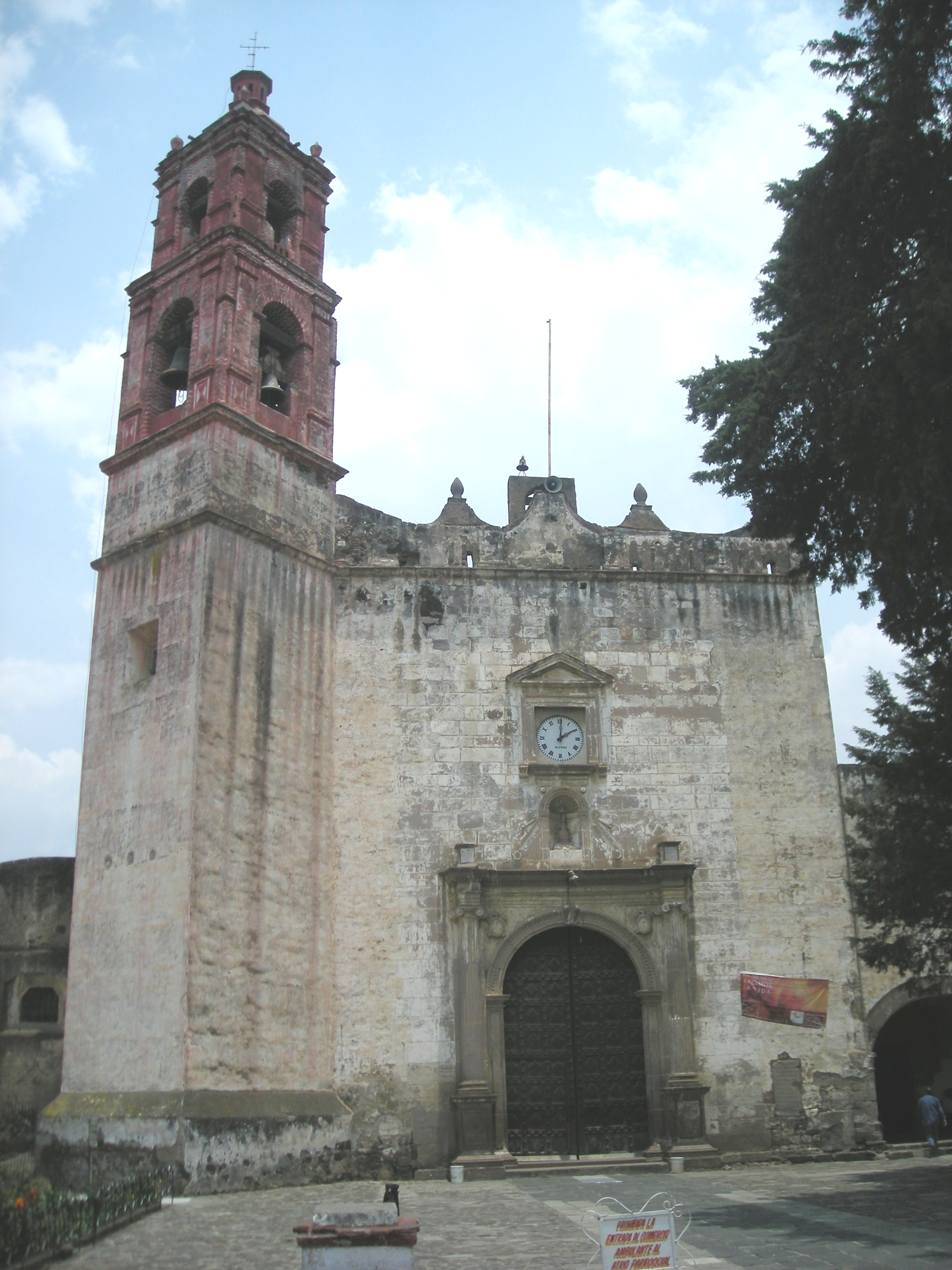
Facade of the church

The Temple of San Luis Obispo, with the adjoining Capilla Abierta (Open Chapel) were built in the 16th century by the Franciscans as part of the Monastery of San Luis. The first church was built by Friar Juan de Rivas which opened in 1532. The larger complex was constructed between 1585 and 1591. The church is relatively simply decorated with only roses on the jamb of the main doors. In the central nave, there is a large relief of Saint Francis with the stigmata. The church has only one nave with a polygonal space for the main altar. This is covered by a barrel vault with false ribs painted on the ceiling. The interior has a lavish Mexican Baroque altarpiece done in cedar representing the Visit of the Virgin. The paintings on this altar were done by Baltasar de Echave The cloister has frescos with scenes of flora and fauna and human figures, as well as portraits of Martin de Valencia and Saint Clare. Friar Martin de Valencia died in Ayotzingo and is interred in the Tlalmanalco church.

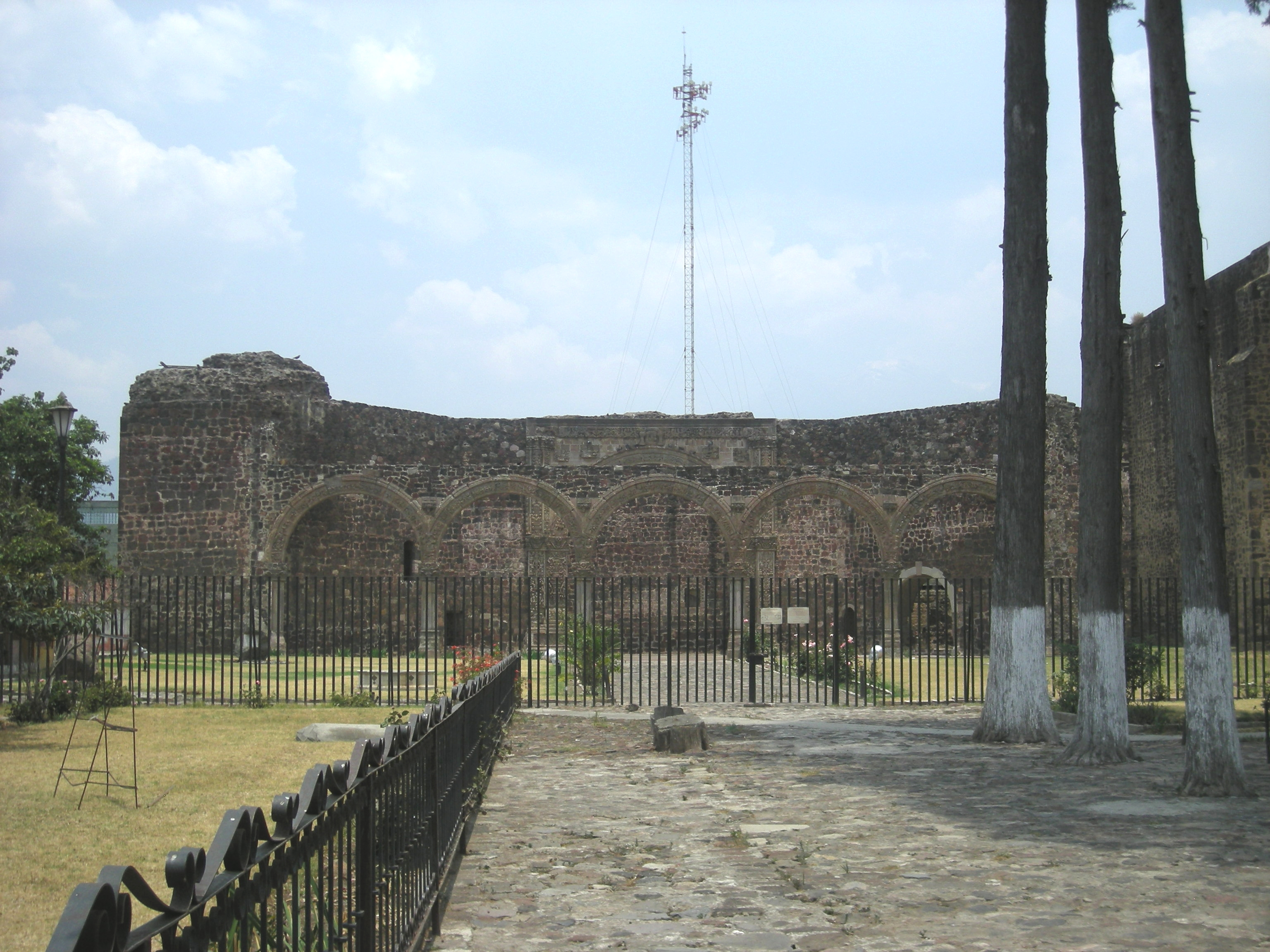
The Capilla Abierta

Tlalmanalco was one of the first sites to have an “open chapel,” and is one of the very few places where one can be found intact today. In the open chapel was where mass was offered to natives who would not enter the dark confines of the typical church. The Capilla Abierta is done in Mexican Baroque style and is considered an interesting example of “tequitqui” art. The word “tequitqui” is from Nahuatl, meaning “vassal.” This expression was used to refer to artistic works, especially sculpture, that had Christian themes but was done by indigenous craftsmen. The Capilla Abierta has a trapezoidal layout, left incomplete. Five arches with capitals finished with reliefs and a frieze that follows the outline of the arches filled with human figures. These arches were reserved for persons of high social rank. The arch behind these was most likely reserved for the altar. The interior is “proto- renaissance” and decorated with Italian-style motifs and figures that seem to represent indigenous bestiary. Images includes telamons, male goats (to represent lust) and a portrait of Friar Martin de Valencia, and Saint Claire. The mix of Christian and indigenous motifs has been studied by Gustavo Curiel and others. According to Curiel, the images seem to represent the clash between idolatry, associated with the devil and Christianity in competition for the soul.

Nonohualca Museum exhibits archeological pieces from the area around Tlalmanalco. Much of the work is stone sculpture, the best known of which is the Effigy of Xochipilli. This statue was found on the side of the volcano Popocatépetl near Tlalmanalco. however, this piece is in the Museum of Anthropology in Mexico City.

== Culture ==
=== Gastronomy ===
Dishes of the area include mixiote, tlacoyos with fava beans, pinto beans and requeson, cecina, green mole with chicken or pork, and pork in chile mulato but a very local specialty is tamales with capulins (a type of cherry) and corn.

=== Festivals ===
In October 2008, the town held its first International Festival of Antique Music, inviting vocalist Rita Guerrero, flutist Horacio Franco, the Alharaca Ensamble among others. The festival was a series of twelve concerts held in the most historically important sites of the town such as the Temple of San Luis Obispo the Old Belthemite Hospital and the main plaza.

The major annual celebrations revolve around the town's patron saints, especially Saint Louis, the Bishop and the Archangel Raphael. The feast of Saint Louis, the Bishop is on 20 August and the feast of the Archangel Raphael is 29 September. They are celebrated with processions, fireworks and local dances including “Los Doce Pares de Francia”, “Marotas” and “Chinelos.”

== The municipality ==
As municipal seat, the town of Tlalmanalco has governing jurisdiction for the following communities: San Antonio Tlaltecahuacán, San Lorenzo Tlalmimilolpan, San Rafael, Santo Tomás Atzingo, Ranchería San José Zavaleta, La Ladrillera, Rancho Santa Cruz, Rancho Cuautenampa (La Quebradora), La Escondida, Rancho la Mesa, Santa María, Restaurante el Arenal (Familia Carbajal), El Brasero, Gavillero (Rancho el Gavillero), Lomas del Pedregal, Santiago (Kilómetro Cincuenta y Ocho y Medio), Fraccionamiento Valle Plateado, Villa Rincón de las Montañas, La Presa, Ejido San Lorenzo (La Cañada), Rancho de la Huerta, El Durazno, Rancho Santa Rita, Terreno San Luis (La Nopalera), Rancho la Joya (La Rosa), Vista Hermosa, Fraccionamiento Vergel de la Sierra, El Trapiche (Xacalco), Rancho Alfa y Omega, Colonia Ejidal (San Juan Atzacoaloya), El Faro, El Capulín, Tiro de las Palomas, Colonia el Magueyal Dos, Rancho Carvajal, Rancho San Luis, Rancho Fernando de la Machorra, Rancho la Encumbre, Colonia la Esperanza, Tepopotal and Fraccionamiento las Palomas. Together, the municipality has a total area of 158.76 km^{2} (61.30 sq mi) and a population of 43,930.

Uncultivated areas are mostly pine forest, which cover about 65% of the municipality. Only 17.9% of the land is used for agriculture, mostly growing corn during the rainy season. The area also has some livestock raising. About 40% of the municipality's population is employed in industries such as paper and textile mills as well as small workshops. There is logging for wood as well, but this is heavily managed. Tlalmanalco has been designated as a “sustainability center” by the Foundation for Sustainable Development in Mexico in cooperation with the state government and UAM. This is in response to the deterioration of the environment in this area, as well as population growth, leading to demand for more public services.

The major river here is called La Compañía, which has nine arroyos, one lake and seven aqueducts associated with it in the municipality. Much of the water flowing from this system comes from the Ayolotepito glacier. However, potable water availability is an issue here. In January 2008, 400 ranchers in the upper mountains of the municipality, who lack access to potable water themselves, protested and shut down a project to transport water to the lowlands and especially to the municipal seat. The protesters are demanding access to the water to be carried by the new line.

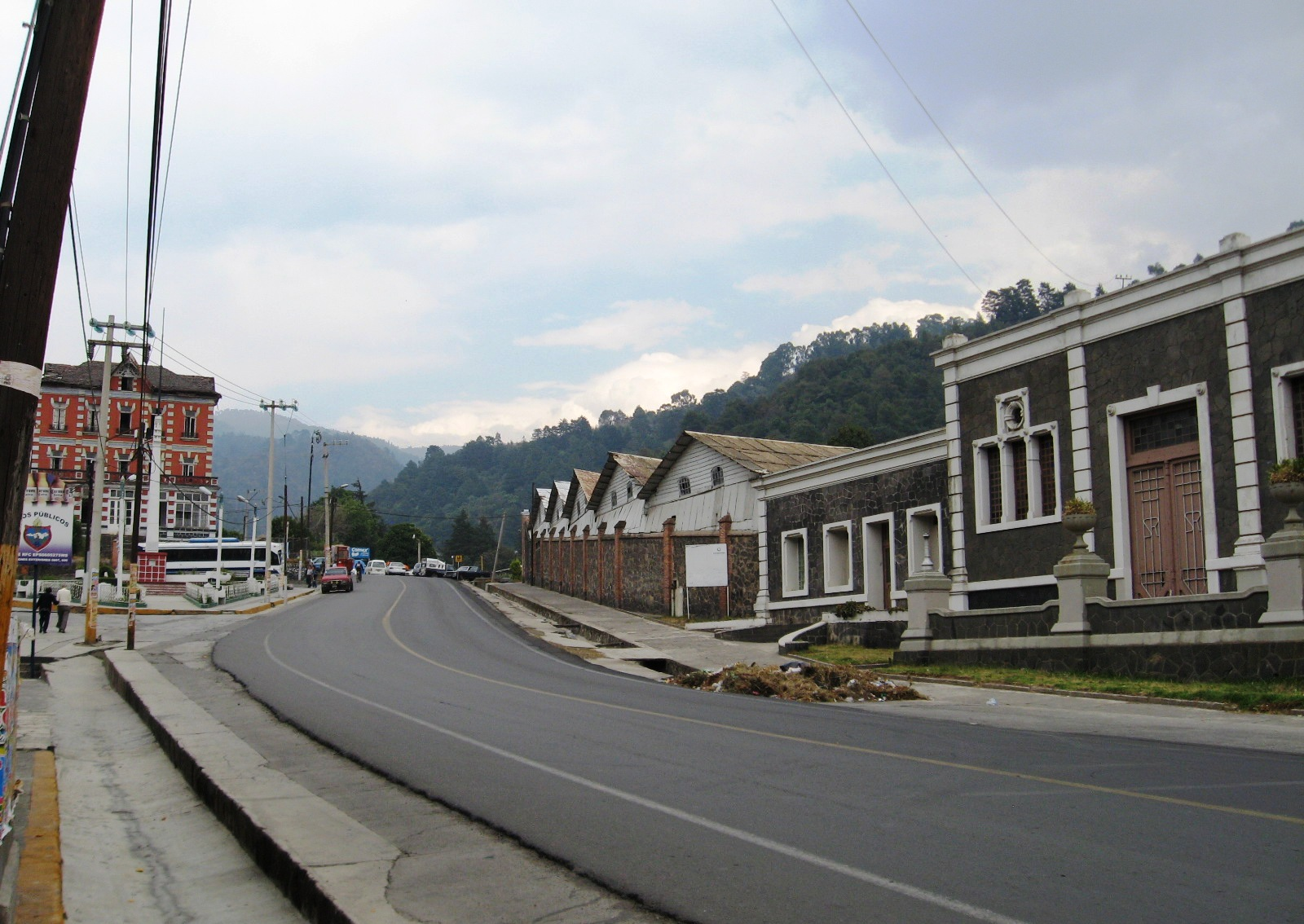
San Rafael

The most important community in the municipality outside of the seat is San Rafael, located about 5 km east of the town of Tlalmanalco at the foot of the Iztaccihuatl volcano The town essentially was created due to the placement of the San Rafael paper mill, which reached its height of production between 1930 and 1970. Its old cinema and casino are still standing but empty, and there are a number of older houses that show the French influence that was popular in Mexico between the 19th and 20th centuries. The town is nearly surrounded by pine forest and there are many unpaved roads leading into it, most of which were cut by the paper mill.

The municipality has a number of elevations, including Teyotl, a 4700 meters and Tlatlachelo at 3175 meters. The latter has some Toltec-era shrines at its peak.

== Notable residents ==
- Grisell Pérez (1982–2021), human rights activist.
