= Amecameca de Juárez =

- Municipal Seat
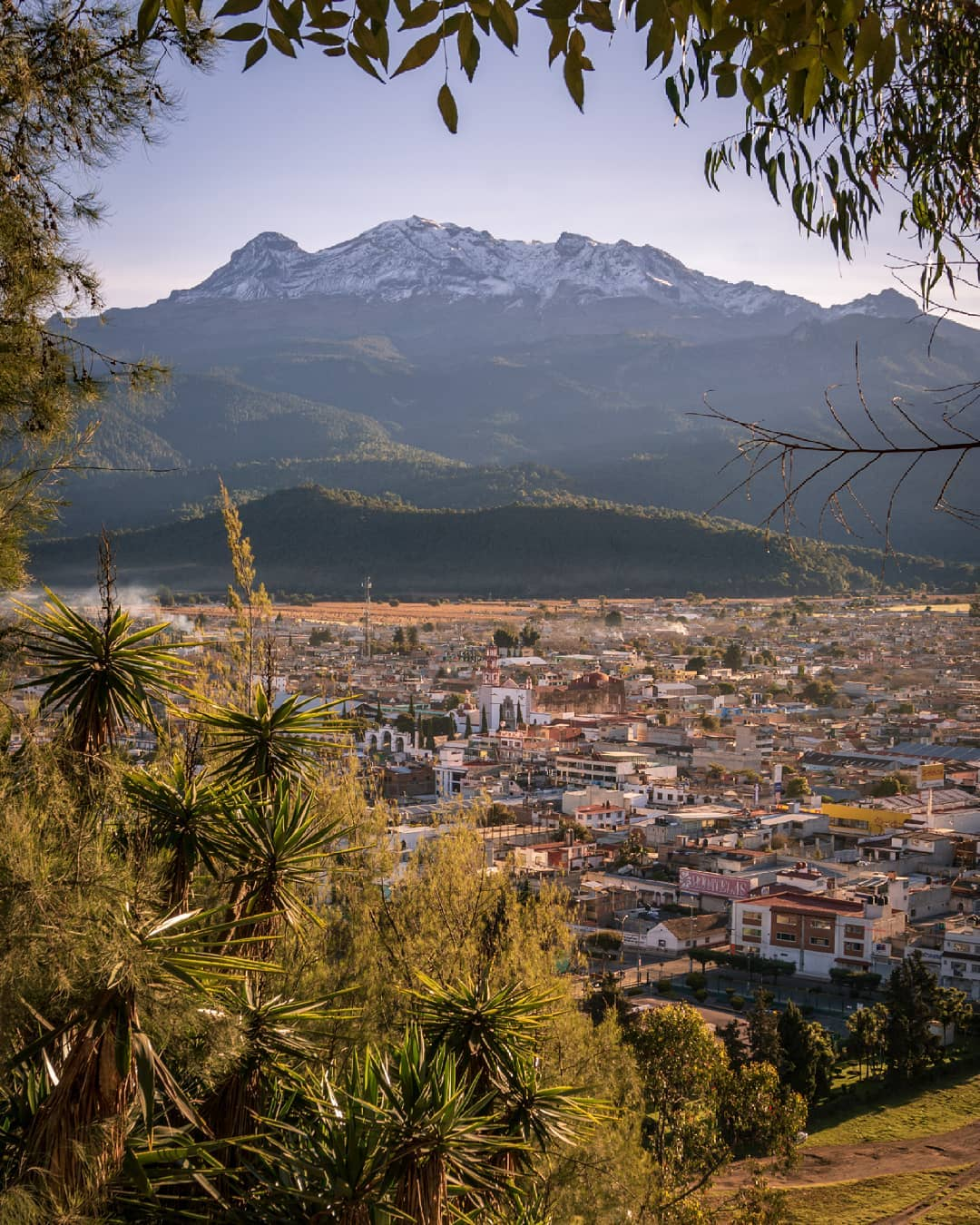

- Location in Mexico
- Coordinates: 19°45′0″N 99°10′16″W
- Country: Mexico
- State: Mexico (state)

Population (2020)
  - Total: 33,716
- Time zone: UTC-6 (Central Standard Time)

Amecameca de Juárez is a town and the municipal seat of the Amecameca municipality in Mexico State (Edomex) in Mexico.

== Etymology ==
The name Amecameca comes from Nahuatl. It has been interpreted to mean “place where the papers signal or mark,” or “paper used ceremoniously.” The paper is called amatl, which is a bark paper used to dress images of gods and is still made as a craft. “de Juárez” was added to the name in 1887 by the government of the state of Mexico in honor of Benito Juárez.

== Economy ==
=== Tourism ===
The area is a traditional weekend getaway for Mexico City, Puebla state and Morelos state residents. Tourists come here to enjoy the scenery, eat barbacoa, rabbit and other foods in a traditional tianguis or municipal market. It is also a local pilgrimage site to the sanctuary of the Señor del Sacromonte.

The traditional entrance to the historic center of the town is a colonial era arch, which was built in 1731 and located on the southeast corner of the main plaza next to the municipal palace. It contains a medallion with an image of Christ as the "Humilladero" (humbled), which colonial travelers worshipped. The arch is made of sandstone in Baroque style with geometric fretwork. At the very top is a small column on which used to sit a statue of San Sebastian de Aparcicio. In the 1970s, a bus hit the arch and toppled the statue, which was never replaced.

The main plaza has a 1950s era kiosk and contains two small stores in its base selling regional candies. The upper portion has a jukebox. The plaza also contains monuments to Miguel Hidalgo y Costilla and Benito Juárez as well as a ring from a Mesoamerican ball court of the 13th century. The pavement of the plaza was replaced in 1999 from paving stone to patterned concrete. In 2003, a hemicycle dedicated to Benito Juárez was added. While it is considered to be a park, the plaza is often filled with stands on market days and during festivals, but most cultural events take place at the esplanade of the municipal palace. The green areas of the plaza contain sculptures of lions made of iron, but unlike real lions, these are shown with nopal plants, with a boa constrictor and other poses and were donated by the former owners of the Hacienda of Chapingo. For this reason the plaza is also called the Jardin de Leones (Lion Garden).

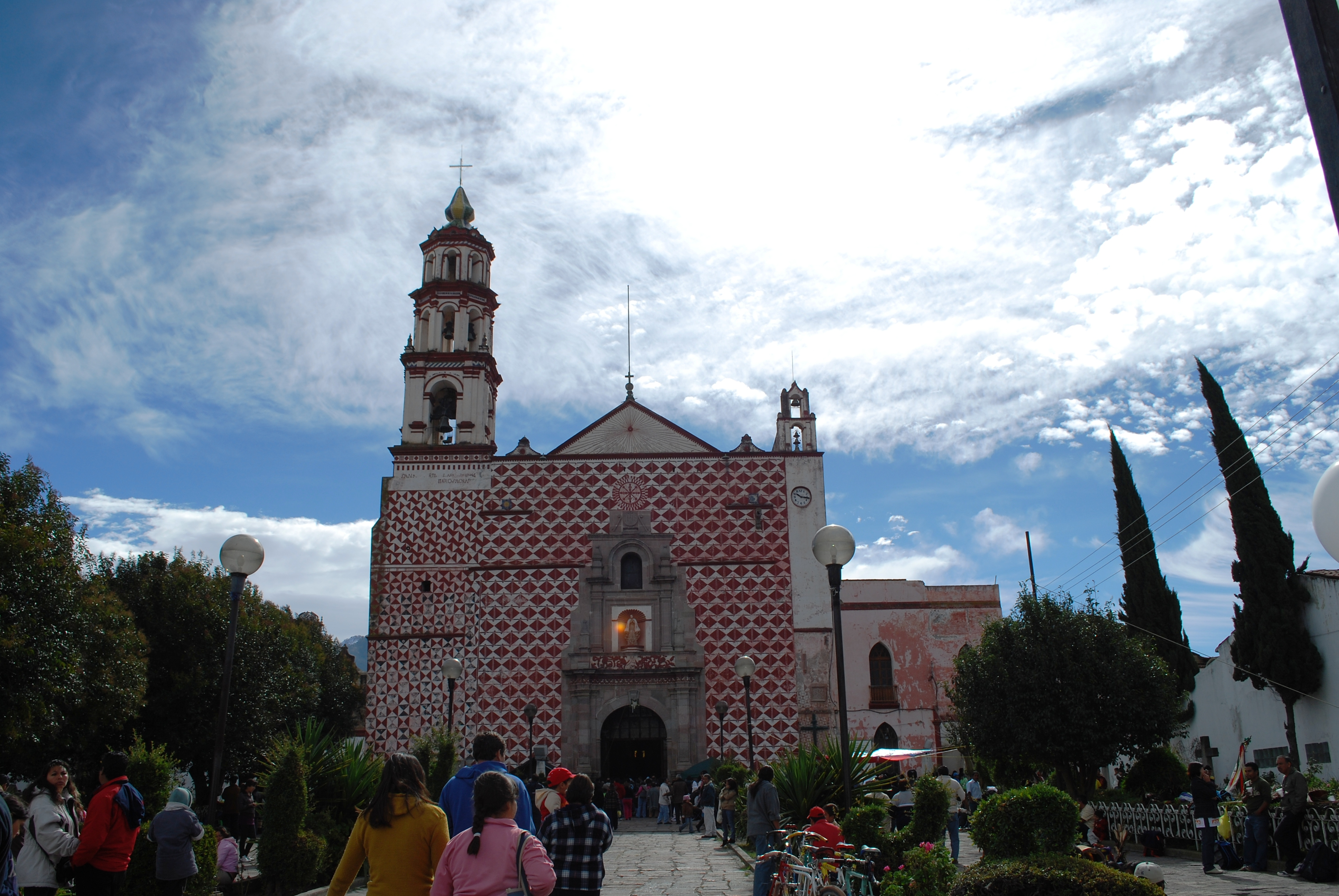
Parish of La Asunción

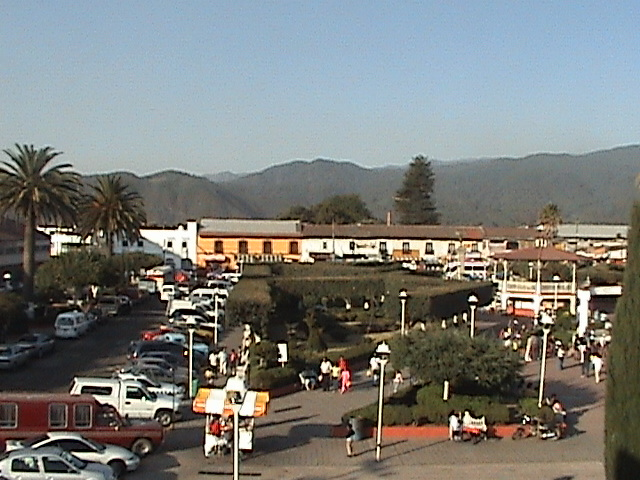
Main plaza

Facing the plaza on the east side is the Parish of the Asunción, which was originally a Dominican monastery, founded in 1553. The main portal is made of pink stone and still in good condition. This architectural style is very austere. On the facade of La Asuncion there is only sculpture of the Virgin Mary with the faces of angels at her feet and a window cornice, which has decorations in the form of raindrops. Inside, the main altar is Neoclassical. One of the side altars is Baroque with Biblical images surrounded by Solomonic columns. The sacristy has two altars, another Baroque one with Solomonic columns and one dedicated to the Señor del Sacromonte. The most noteworthy painting here is The Angel of the Annuniciation done by Echave Orio. The two story cloister is one of the most primitive in the Americas and has four segmental arches resting on octagonal columns on each side. There are two other important chapels in the town; the Chapel of San Juan and the Chapel of the Virgen del Rosario which have functioned as points of reference for travelers since they were built. They were built for the common people of adobe and wood.

Also near the main plaza is the municipal market, which is a traditional place to enjoy local culinary specialties. It contains central Mexican staples such carnitas and barbacoa, but the local signature dish is rabbit. Rabbit is a signature dish of the region. It is prepared as mixote, in moles, wrapped in corn husks and steamed, or simply covered in chili pepper and roasted. Like in other parts of Mexico, atole is popular here but there is a variation seasoned with chili pepper and epazote. The municipal market offers dishes and products made from local nuts such a walnuts such as chiles en nogada, chicken in a nut sauce, mixiotes with rabbit and nuts as well as a walnut liquor. In front of this market is a crafts market which sells clay items, photographs of the volcanos, local breads and turnovers filled with apple or pineapple. The market also sells a liquor from walnuts year round but it is especially during the annual Walnut Festival, which takes place in August. This permanent market is supplemented by the tianguis, or traditional outdoor market, held each Sunday. On this day, traders and craftsmen come from as far as Puebla to sell. The town has one pulqueria which serves the pulque straight or flavored. Common flavors such as strawberry, mango, guava and nut are available, but the owner also has original recipes for flavors such as tomato, celery, carrot and others which the owner says are "secret."

== Education ==
The state university of UAEM (Universidad Autónoma del Estado de Mexico) has a local campus here.

A major charity is the Cottolengo Mexicano, which is a project of the Obra Don Orione religious foundation. This group was founded in Italy in 1905 and has expanded to over thirty countries to offer charity, education and evangelization. The group established itself here and in Ciudad Nezahualcoyotl in the mid 1990s. The Cottolengo serves homeless children and those who are disabled.
