= Grisell Pérez =

Mexican human rights activist (1982–2021)

- Born: Grisell Pérez Rivera; 12 February 1983; Ciudad Nezahualcóyotl, State of Mexico, Mexico
- Disappeared: Early March 2021; Tlalmanalco, State of Mexico, Mexico
- Died: 17 March 2021 (aged 38); Mixquiahuala, Hidalgo, Mexico
- Cause of death: Stoning
- Body discovered: 17 March 2021 (discovered), August 2022 (identified)
- Occupation: Human rights activist
- Years active: 2014–2021
- Known for: Campaigning against femicide in Mexico

Grisell Pérez Rivera (12 February 1983 – March 2021) was a Mexican human rights activist. Known for her campaigning against violence against women and femicide, she founded a women's shelter, Cabaña de Sabiduría, in Tlalmanalco, State of Mexico, in 2014. Pérez disappeared in 2021, and she was subsequently determined to have been the victim of femicide following the identification of her body in 2022.

== Personal life ==
Pérez was born on 12 February 1983 in Ciudad Nezahualcóyotl, a city in the State of Mexico, to Concepción Rivera.

== Activism ==
In 2014, Pérez founded Cabaña de Sabiduría (lit. 'Cabin of Wisdom') a women's shelter in Tlalmanalco. The shelter provided support to female victims of gender-based and institutional violence.

Pérez went on to campaign for the Mexican government to address issues of femicide in Mexico. On 22 February 2019, she participated in the first forum concerning the victims of crimes against humanity at the Senate of the Republic; in April, she participated in a 50-day sit-in in front of the National Palace to protest increasing rates of femicide during the presidency of Andrés Manuel López Obrador. During the protest, she stood in front of López Obrador's car in an attempt to give him letter demanding he facilitate a meeting between protesters and the Secretary of the Interior, Olga Sánchez Cordero, to discuss violence against women. On 11 April, Pérez took part in a discussion at the Chamber of Deputies in which she called for femicide to be officially recognised as a public health, national security, and social justice state of emergency.

== Disappearance and death ==
Pérez was last seen in early March 2021 in the Los Volcanes area of Santa María, Tlalmanalco; she had informed her mother Concepción that she was going to work at Cabaña de la Sabiduría. Pérez's family reported her missing on 26 March; on 13 April, the State of Mexico Attorney General's Office issued an official missing person report. Pérez's disappearance was denounced by human rights groups such as Amnesty International, the Office of the United Nations High Commissioner for Human Rights in Mexico, the National Network of Women Human Rights Defenders in Mexico, and the Mesoamerican Initiative of Women Human Rights Defenders, which called on Mexican authorities to prioritise locating her. Human rights activists completed their own searches for Pérez in the State of Mexico and Mexico City.

Malú García, Pérez's family's representative, expressed concerns about irregularities in the official investigation into Pérez's disappearance, including lost evidence, the failure to collect witness testimonies, and a lack of identified motive by investigators. Pérez's mother Concepción Rivera reported that a month after Pérez's disappearance, her home in Tlalmanalco had been demolished by a construction crew, burying her belongings and potentially destroying evidence.

On 17 March 2021, Pérez's body was discovered in El Durazno, an area of Mixquiahuala in the state of Hidalgo. Her body remained unidentified due to Pérez's missing person report, including her description, not being published in Hidalgo. In August 2022, Pérez's body was formally identified by genetic testing and her family. News of the discovery of Pérez's body was announced on 25 November 2022.

In November or December 2022, Pérez's partner, Gerardo Esteban N., was arrested in Chimalhuacán on suspicion of her murder. Injuries to Pérez's body suggested she may have been stoned. In 2024, Gerardo Esteban N. was sentenced to 31 years and three months in prison for Pérez's femicide.
