= Tenango del Aire =

- Municipality
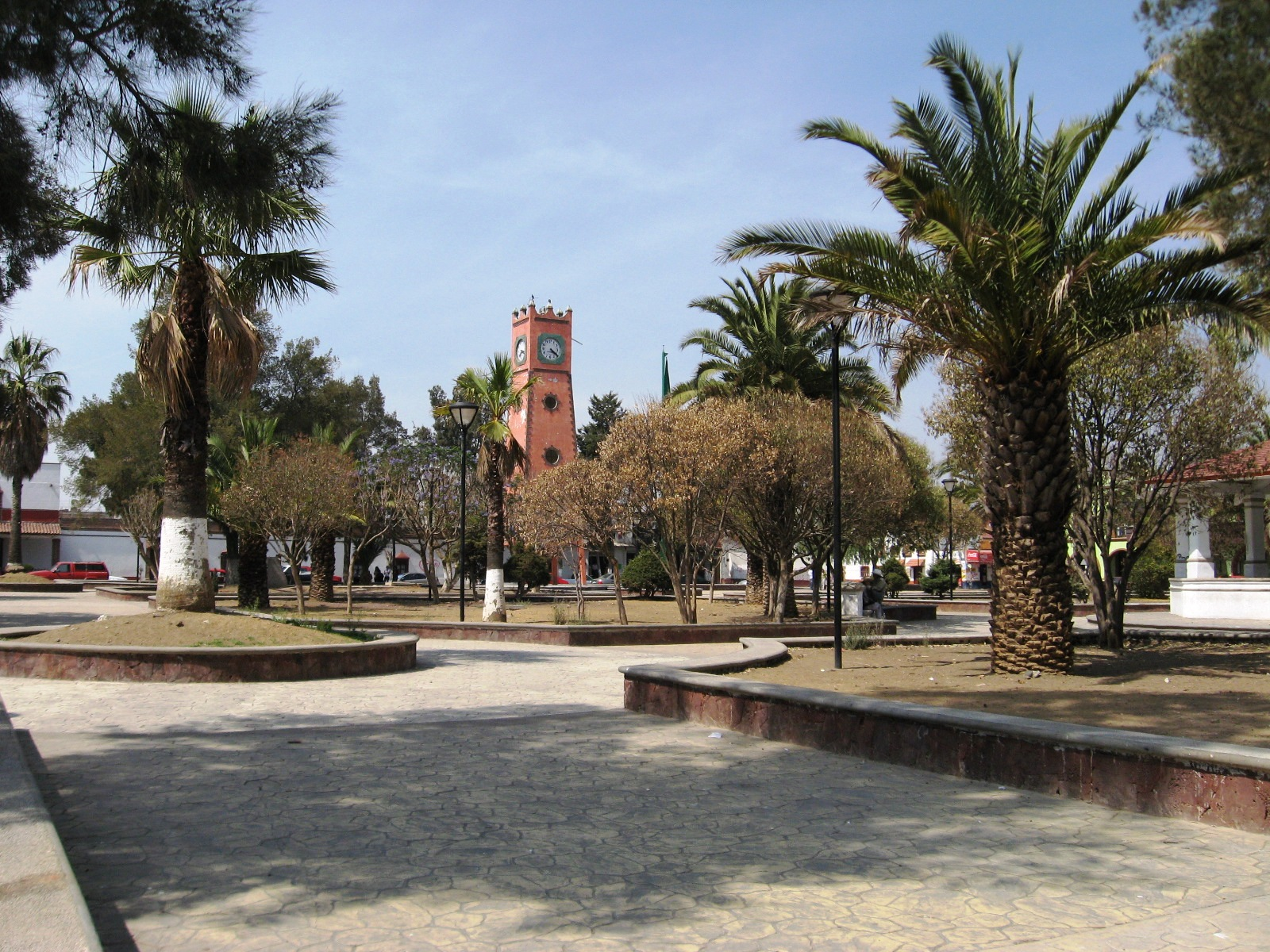

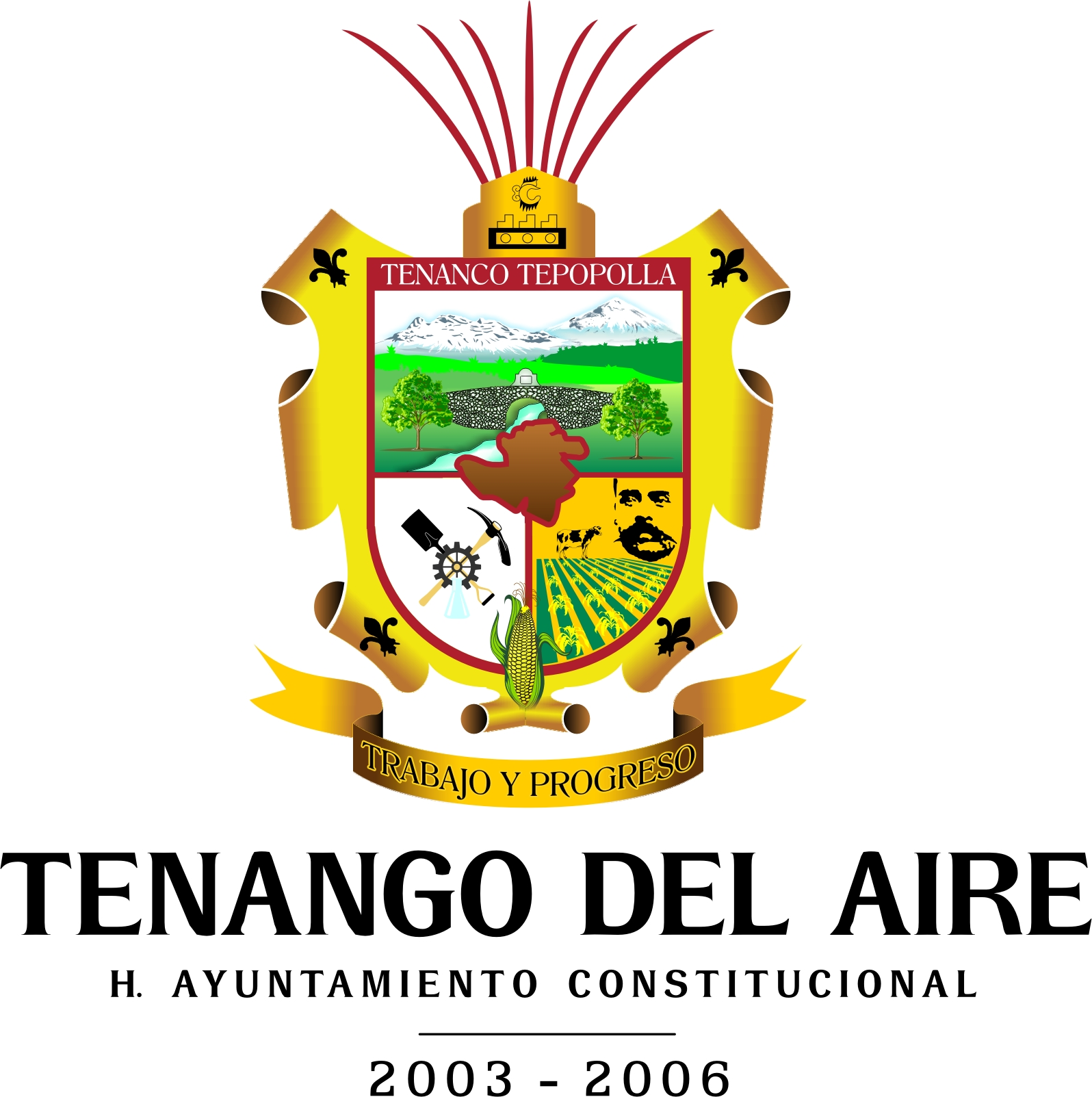
- Coat of arms

- Location within Mexico
- Coordinates: 19°09′27″N 98°51′29″W
- Country: Mexico
- State: State of Mexico
- Municipal Seat: Tenango del Aire

Government
  - Municipal President: Adiel Zermman Miguel 2013-2015
- Elevation (of seat): 2,372 m (7,782 ft)

Population (2010) Municipality
  - Municipality: 10,578
  - Seat: 5,915
- Time zone: UTC-6 (CST)
- Postal code (of seat): 56780
- Area code: 717
- Website: (in Spanish)

Tenango del Aire is a municipality located in the southeast portion of the State of Mexico and is about 42 km southeast of Mexico City. The municipal seat is the town of Tenango del Aire. The municipality is bordered by Temamatla, Tlalmanalco, Juchitepec, and Ayapango. Despite the fact that this municipality is distinctly rural, it falls within the Mexico City Metropolitan Area. The name “Tenango del Aire” came about in two parts. Originally and until 1890, the town was known as Tenango de Topopula. “Tenango” means “walled in” or “fenced by stones.” The second part is due to visits by President Porfirio Diaz, who commented on the winds that are prevalent here. “del Aire” means “of the air.”

== The town ==
=== History ===
In 1162, a subgroup of Chichimecas called the Teotenancas (Old Tenancas), entered the Valley of Chalco, conquering nearby Amecameca 100 years later. The first settlement in this part of the valley was in what is now San Mateo Tepopula, which is near the town. The Spaniards passed by here on their way to Tenochtitlan.

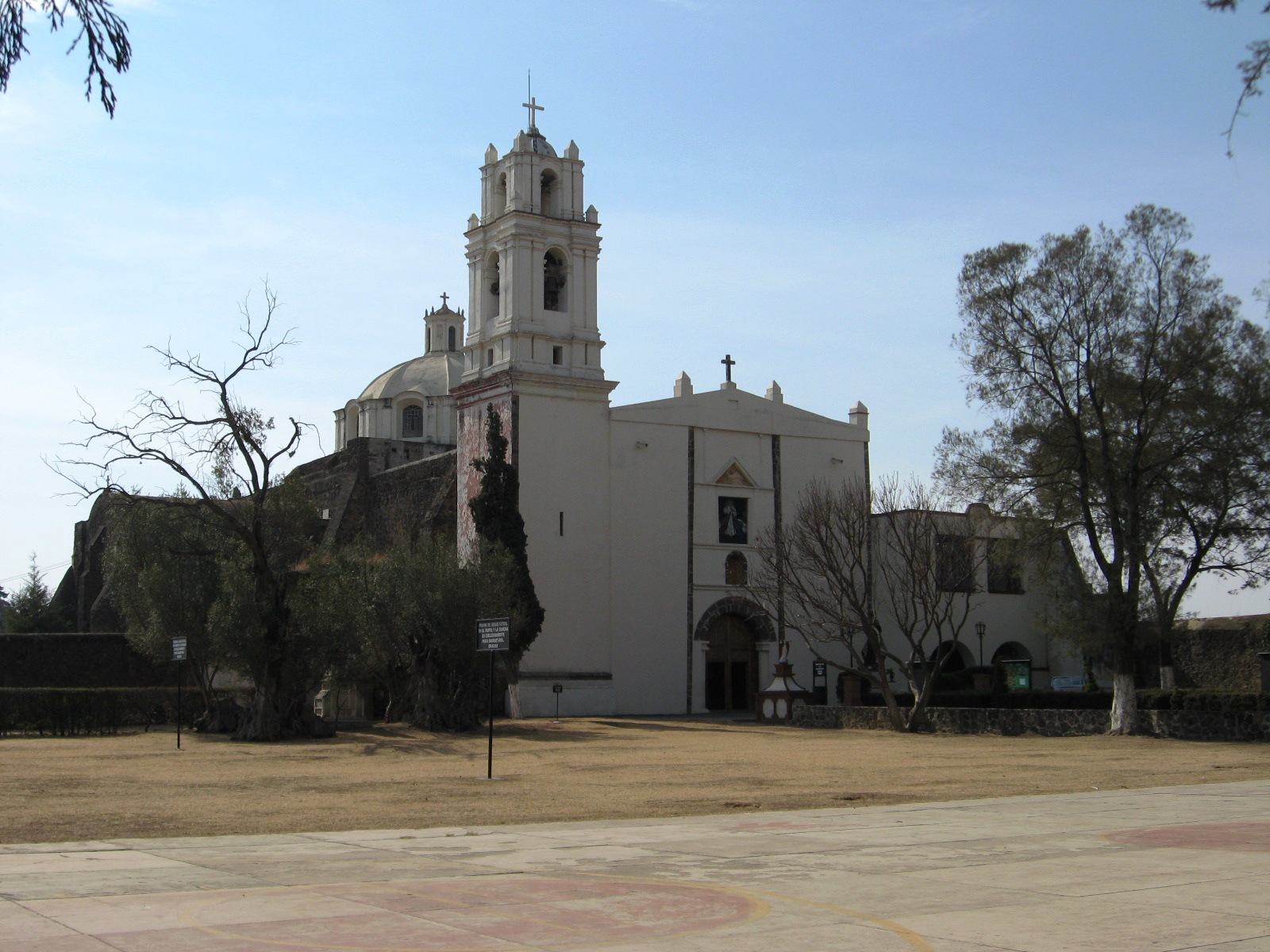
San Juan Bautista Church

Soon after, in 1521, a number of Tenancas (descendants of the Teotenacas) moved to where the town is now, calling it “Tenanco.” In 1532, Juan de Zumárraga, the first Archbishop of Mexico, ordered the construction of the parish church, called San Juan Bautista (John the Baptist), and called the village here San Juan Tepopula. This term today is used to designate one of the neighborhoods of the town. Eventually, the official name was Tenango de San Juan Bautista Tepopula, then Tenango Tepopula, until the official name changed to what it is now.

Tenango del Aire gained municipality status in 1820, and the current municipal palace was built in 1978. As of the 2010 census, the town had a population of 5,915 people.

=== Notable sites ===
The San Juan Bautista Parish and plaza was ordered in 1532 and completed in 1671, initially run by the Franciscans. The baptistery dates to the 18th century and has a baptismal with reliefs of the Archangel Michael and an inscription that dates it to the year 1710. It contains a sculpture of Our Lady of the Rosary and paintings that depicts souls burning in Hell, both of which date to the 17th century.

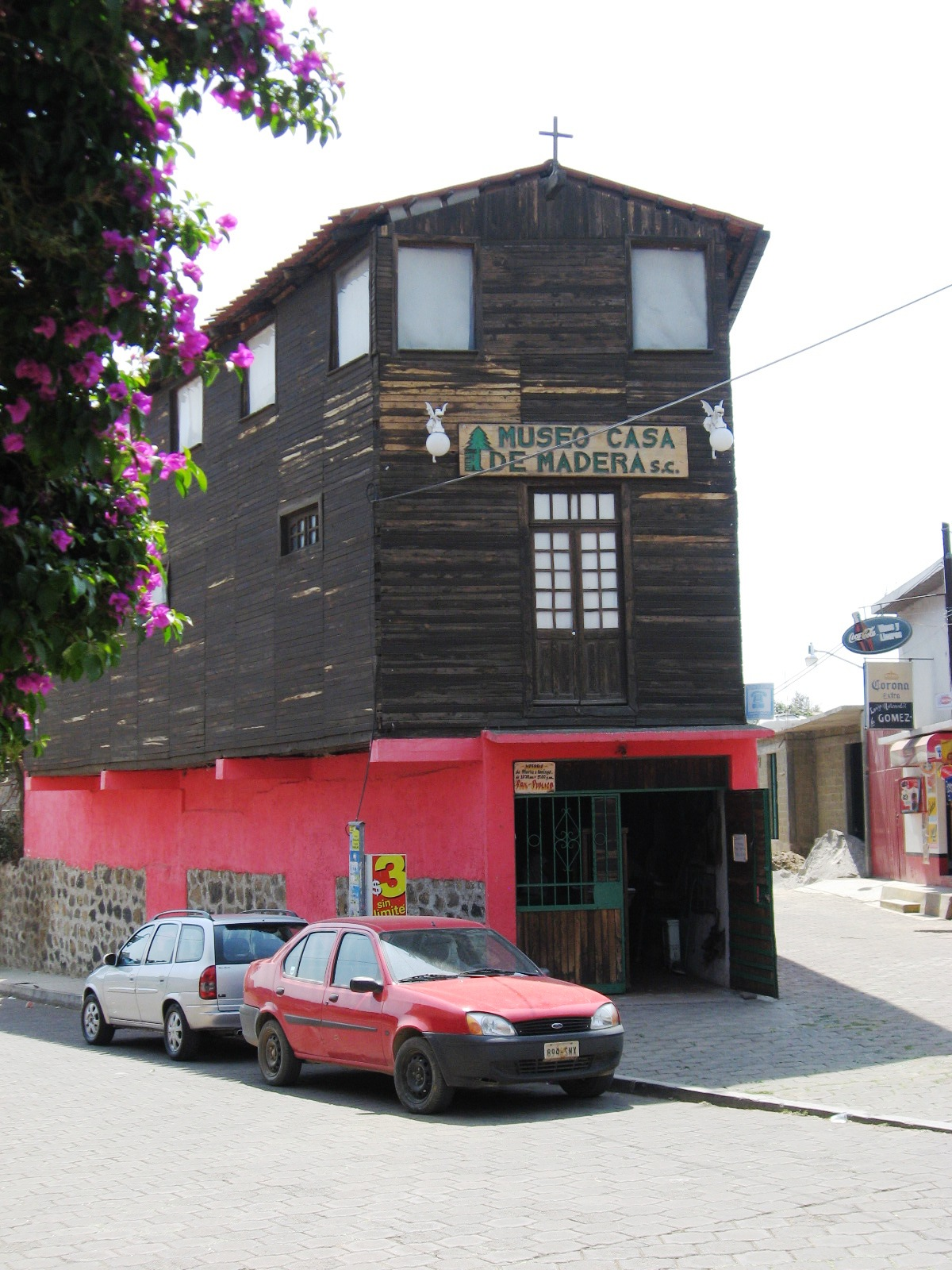
Casa de Madera Museum

The Casa de Madera Museum is a private museum which exhibits the second most important collection of applied arts in Mexico after the Franz Mayer Museum, according to CONACULTA. The museum's collection is spread out over four buildings with no apparent order and no other infrastructure other than the collection itself. The collection includes thousands of pieces from pre-Hispanic artifacts, religious art from the colonial period, and even modern art by known names, but the majority of the collection is everyday items from the last three centuries.

The Casa de Madera has been likened to visiting a grandparents’ attic. There are portraits from the 1920s, barbers’ implements, kitchens and living rooms packed with old furniture and decorations, old toys, watches, telephones, jars, farming implements, musical instruments and more. There is even a pen capable of shooting a 22 caliber bullet from World War II. The owners, Luis Pastor and Ricardo Flores, have been amassing the collection since the 1970s. The buildings in which the objects are stored are private houses, some areas of which the family still lives. Visitors to the museum are guided by the owners and their family who chat about the pieces as they stroll past. The tour takes about two hours. The museum has received grants from the Fondo Nacional para la Cultura y las Artes and has been open to the public since 1995.

A sports complex was opened here in 2006, with two multipurpose gyms, two jai alai courts, a soccer field, a playground for children and walking paths.

== The municipality ==
As municipal seat the town of Tenango del Aire is the governing authority for the following communities: San Juan Coxtocan, Santiago Tepopula, Rancho Aculco (El Paraíso), San Luis Aculco, Tecuatitla (Colonia Nueva Tecuatitla), Rancho el Paredón, Cerro de las Campanas, Rutilo Herrera, El Pedregal (Teotoxtipan), Rancho Chavarría (Paraje Puerta), Tecorral, Tlatelpa, Rancho San Isidro Labrador (El Piaje), Rancho Saturnino (Tepalcapa), Tres Platos, La Casa del Puente, Colonia el Mirador and Barrio San Miguel (Las Espinas). The municipality has a territory of 38.09 km^{2} (14.71 sq mi). and a total population of 10,578 inhabitants at the 2010 census. It is the second-least populous municipality that borders Mexico City (the Distrito Federal) directly (following Tlalnepantla Municipality in the State of Morelos).

Lying in a region of old lakebeds and ash from the nearby volcano of Popocatepetl, the land here is fertile. The highest elevation is the Tezoyuca Mountain with other notable elevations such as Cuajoma, Zoceyuca and Xaltepec Mountains. These and others cover about 40% of the municipality's territory. There is one river here called the Apotzonalco, but it only flows during the rainy season as do a number of arroyos. However, there are a number of underground water resources, which supply the municipality with potable water.

Most of the residents of the municipality earn a living through farming and/or livestock raising, producing corn, cattle and domestic fowl. Some fruit, principally capulins, tejocotes, and peaches are grown. About two-thirds of this is for local consumption. There is little industry and commerce here. What is here is limited to the needs of the farming community.

About six kilometers north of the municipal seat is the Chucoatl Ceremonial Center, which is located on an ejido. It is an archeological site with petroglyphs, a stone serpent's head and an etched hydraulic map. The serpent's head is placed such that, at the solstice, the sun rising over the “neck” of the Iztaccíhuatl volcano (which resembles a sleeping woman) shines its first rays of light on it. It is thought to have significance with the fertility of the land. Another pre-Hispanic complex is located by the Cuajoma Mountain. The sites have several layers. Some date from the fall of Teotihuacan in 1600 AD to the occupation of the area by Chichimeca tribes in the 13th and 14th centuries. Artifacts found at the surface date from 1400 to 1521 AD.

There is a research site dedicated to investigating atmospheric conditions, in particular the effects of air pollution in nearby Mexico City. It is the only center located to collect data from times when the wind blows south away from the city. In particular, nitric oxide levels are measured here.

=== Towns and villages ===
The largest localities (cities, towns, and villages) are:

Name	2010 Census Population
Tenango del Aire	5,915
Santiago Tepopula	2,418
San Juan Coxtocan	1,810
Tecuatitla (Colonia Nueva Tecuatitla)	135
Barrio San Miguel (Las Espinas)	70
Total Municipality	10,578
