= Rodrigo Reina Liceaga =

Mexican politician

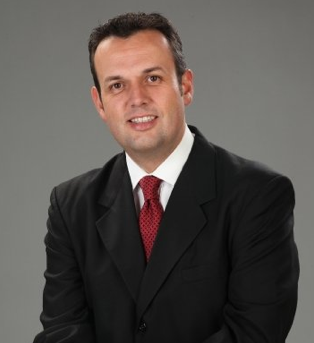
- Born: 14 January 1973 (age 53); Naucalpan, State of Mexico, Mexico
- Occupation: Politician
- Political party: PRI

Rodrigo Reina Liceaga (born 14 January 1973) is a Mexican politician from the Institutional Revolutionary Party (PRI). From 2009 to 2012 he served in the Chamber of Deputies representing the State of Mexico's 21st district during the 61st session of Congress.
