= Cocotitlán =

- Municipality and town
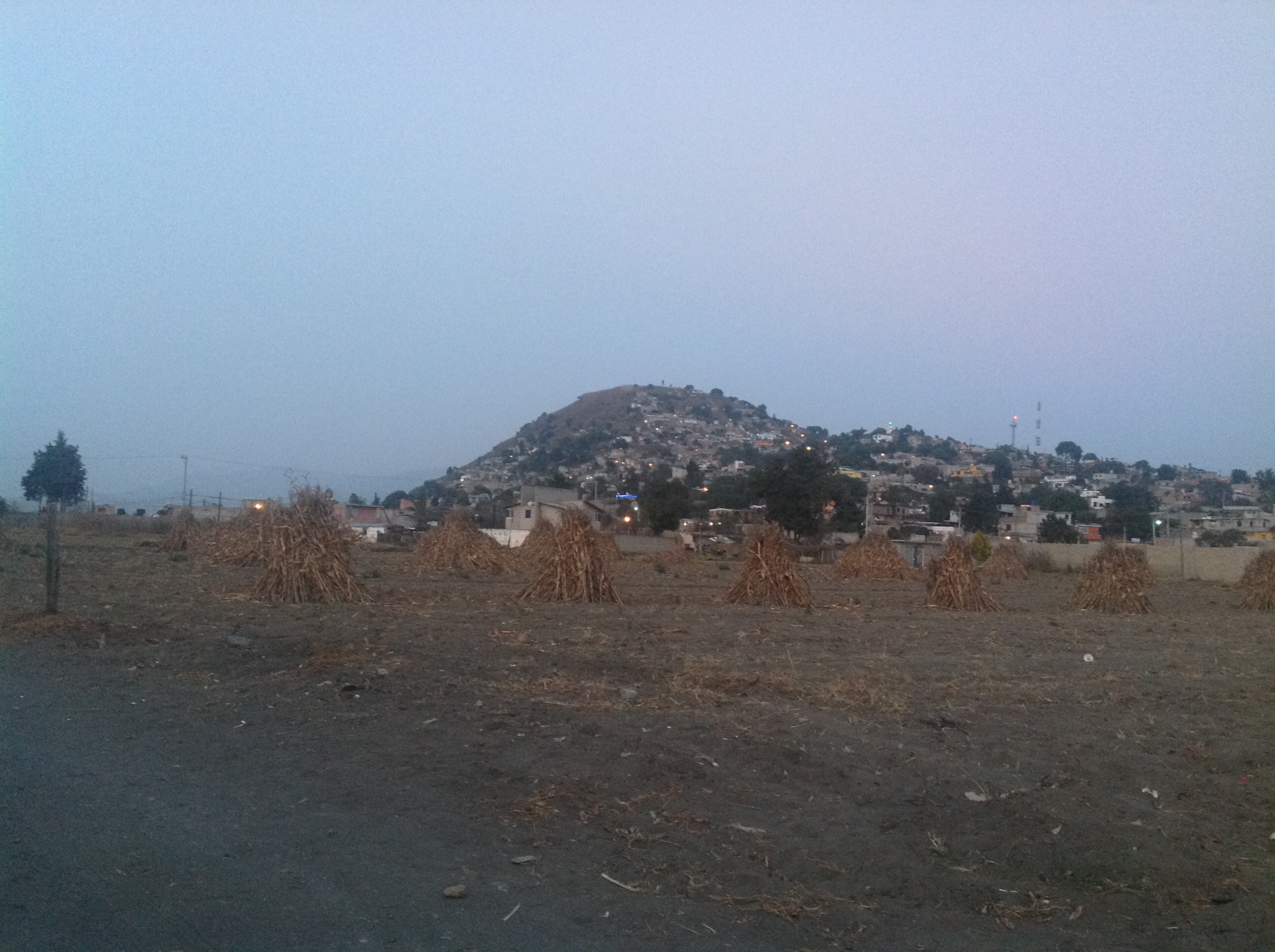

- Coat of arms

- Location in Mexico
- Coordinates: 19°13′N 98°51′W
- Country: Mexico
- State: Mexico (state)
- Established: May 13, 1868

Government
  - Municipal President: Miguel Florín González (2013-2015)

Area
  - Total: 10.45 km^{2} (4.03 sq mi)
- Elevation: 2,300 m (7,500 ft)

Population (2010)
  - Total: 12,142
- Time zone: UTC-6 (Central Standard Time)
- Website: Official site

Cocotitlán is a town and municipality, in the State of Mexico in Mexico. The municipality covers an area of 10.45 km^{2}.

As of 2010, the municipality had a total population of 12,142.
