= Ecatzingo =

- Municipality
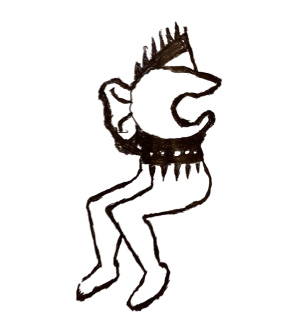
- Coat of arms

- Location in Mexico
- Coordinates: 18°57′N 98°45′W
- Country: Mexico
- State: Mexico (state)

Area
  - Total: 54.71 km^{2} (21.12 sq mi)

Population (2010)
  - Total: 9,369
- Time zone: UTC-6 (Central)

Ecatzingo is one of 125 municipalities, in the State of Mexico in Mexico. The municipal seat is the town of Ecatzingo de Hidalgo. The municipality covers an area of 54.71 km^{2}.

As of 2005, the municipality had a total population of 8247.
