= Mixiote =

Mexican barbecued meat dish

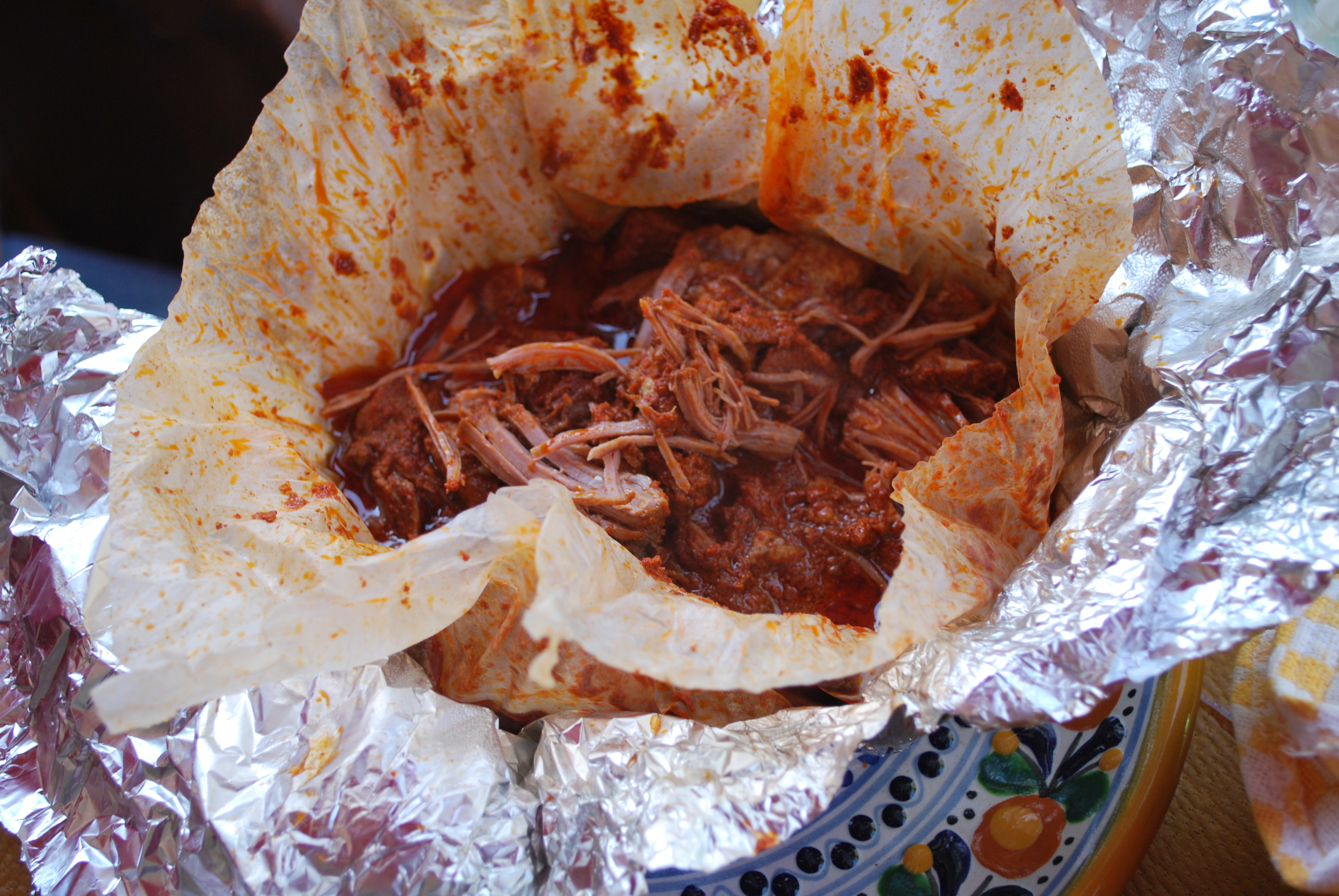
Mixed-meat mixiote

A mixiote (in Spanish:) is a traditional pit-barbecued meat dish in central Mexico; especially in the Basin of Mexico, in which the meat is cooked inside a wrapper, traditionally in the outer skin of an agave leaf.

== Ingredients ==
It is usually made with mutton or rabbit, but chicken, lamb, and pork are also used. The meat is cubed with the bone and seasoned with pasilla and guajillo chili peppers, cumin, thyme, marjoram, bay leaves, cloves and garlic. Diced nopales are often included with the meat before wrapping.

== Preparation ==
The ingredients are wrapped in small packages made of xiotl, the tough semi-transparent outer skin of the leaves of the maguey (century plant, agave) which gives it a unique flavor. The difference is that the use of xiotl gives the food a special flavor, which cannot be substituted. In order to protect agave plants from overharvesting and becoming endangered, many states in Mexico have outlawed the stripping of the epidermis.

In the cities, parchment paper or even aluminum foil was also used to wrap the mixiotes, which can be considered a reminiscence of the old French technique of baking "en papillote", or the Italian "al cartoccio" (in the cartridge). Incidentally, this technique is traditional in many culinary cultures: pepes in Indonesia; zongzi in China; dolmades in Eastern Europe and Central Asia, as well as in Central America, where tamales are usually cooked this way, or for the preparation of pamonha in Brazil.

It can also be prepared in an oven.

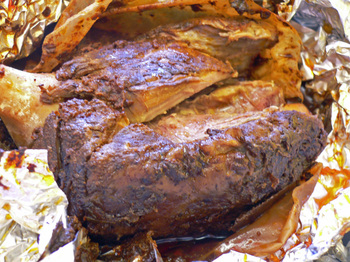
Mixiote meat, as being served in a restaurant

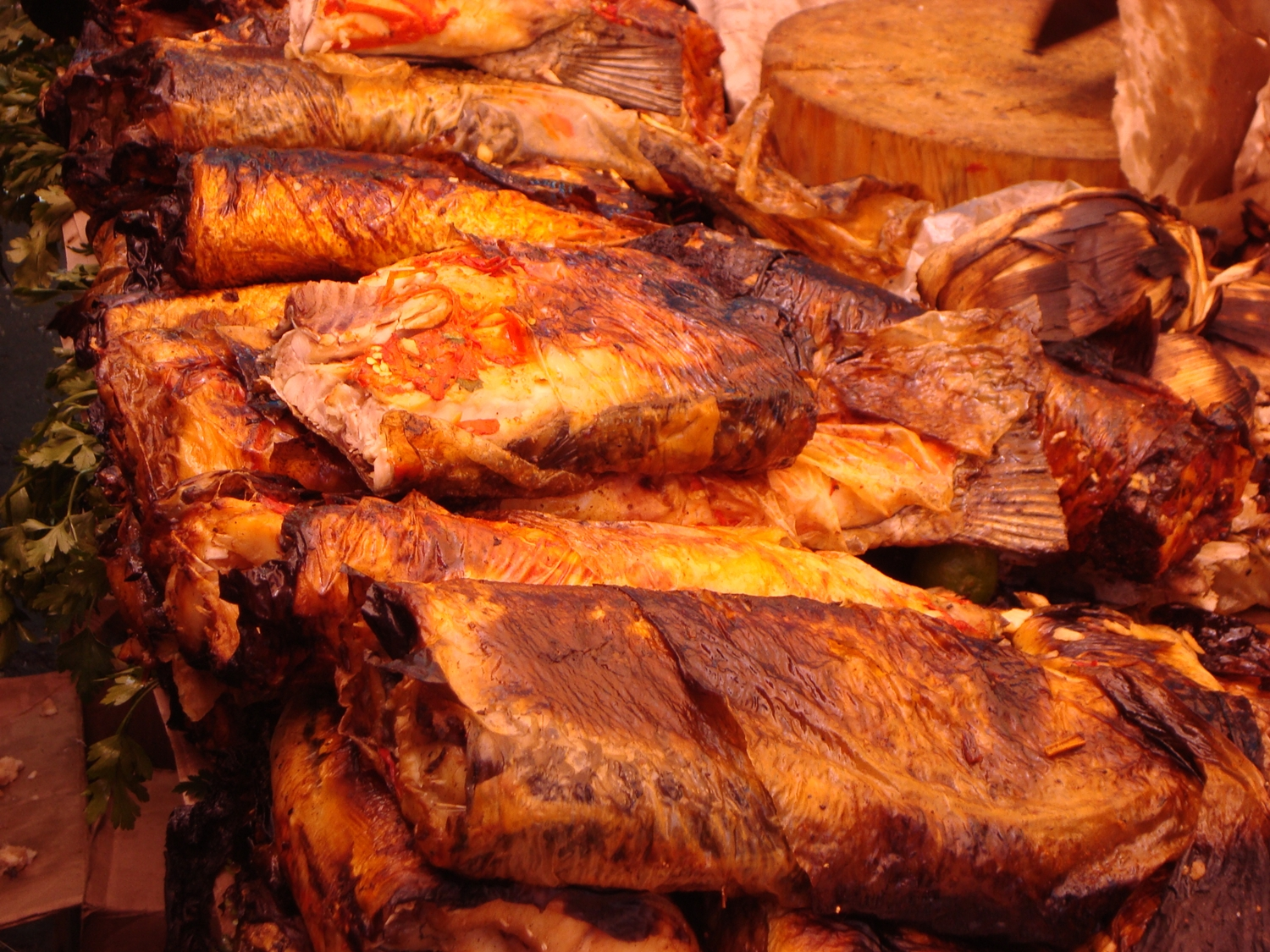
Fish mixiote

== See also ==
- List of barbecue dishes
- List of lamb dishes
- List of meat dishes
- List of Mexican dishes
