= Atlautla =

- Municipality
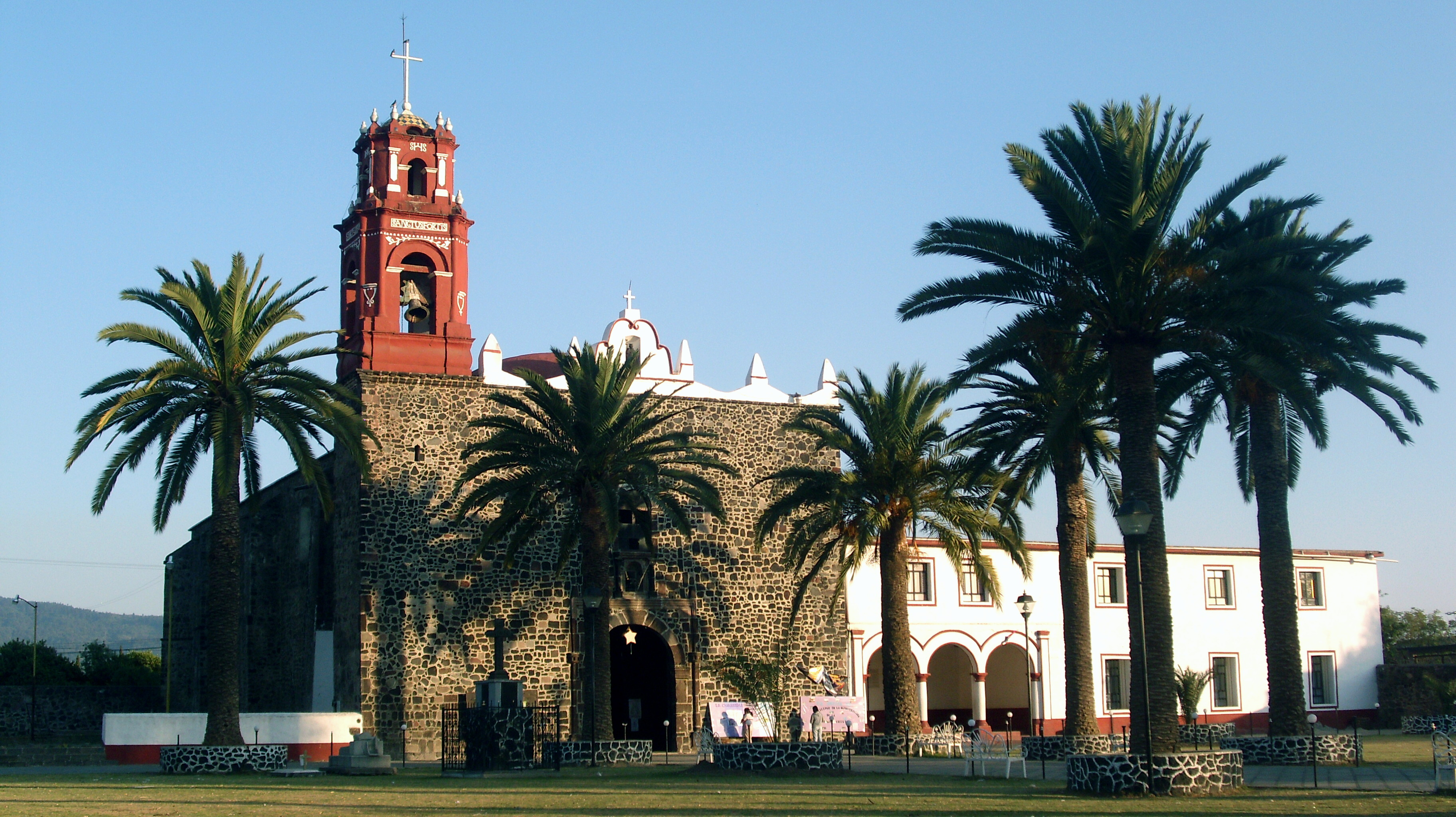
- Iglesia de San Miguel Arcángel

- Coat of arms

- Location in Mexico
- Coordinates: 19°01′40.6″N 98°46′53.2″W
- Country: Mexico
- State: Mexico (state)

Area
  - Total: 134.9 km^{2} (52.1 sq mi)

Population (2020)
  - Total: 31,900
- Time zone: UTC-6 (Central Standard Time)

Atlautla is one of 125 municipalities, in the State of Mexico in Mexico. The municipal seat is the city of Atlautla de Victoria. The municipality covers an area of 134.9 km^{2} (52.1 sq mi).

As of 2020, the municipality had a total population of 31,900.
