= Temamatla =

- Municipality
- Location in Mexico
- Coordinates: 19°12′10″N 98°52′12″W
- Country: Mexico
- State: State of Mexico
- Municipal Seat: Temamatla
- Founded: 1843

Government
  - Municipal President: José Rosalio Muñoz López (2013-2015)

Area
  - Total: 28.42 km^{2} (10.97 sq mi)

Population (2010)
  - Total: 11,206
- Time zone: UTC-6 (Central Standard Time)

Temamatla is a municipality in the State of Mexico in Mexico. The municipality covers an area of 28.42 km^{2} (10.97 sq mi).

As of 2005, the municipality had a total population of 10,135.
