= Tepetlixpa =

- Municipality
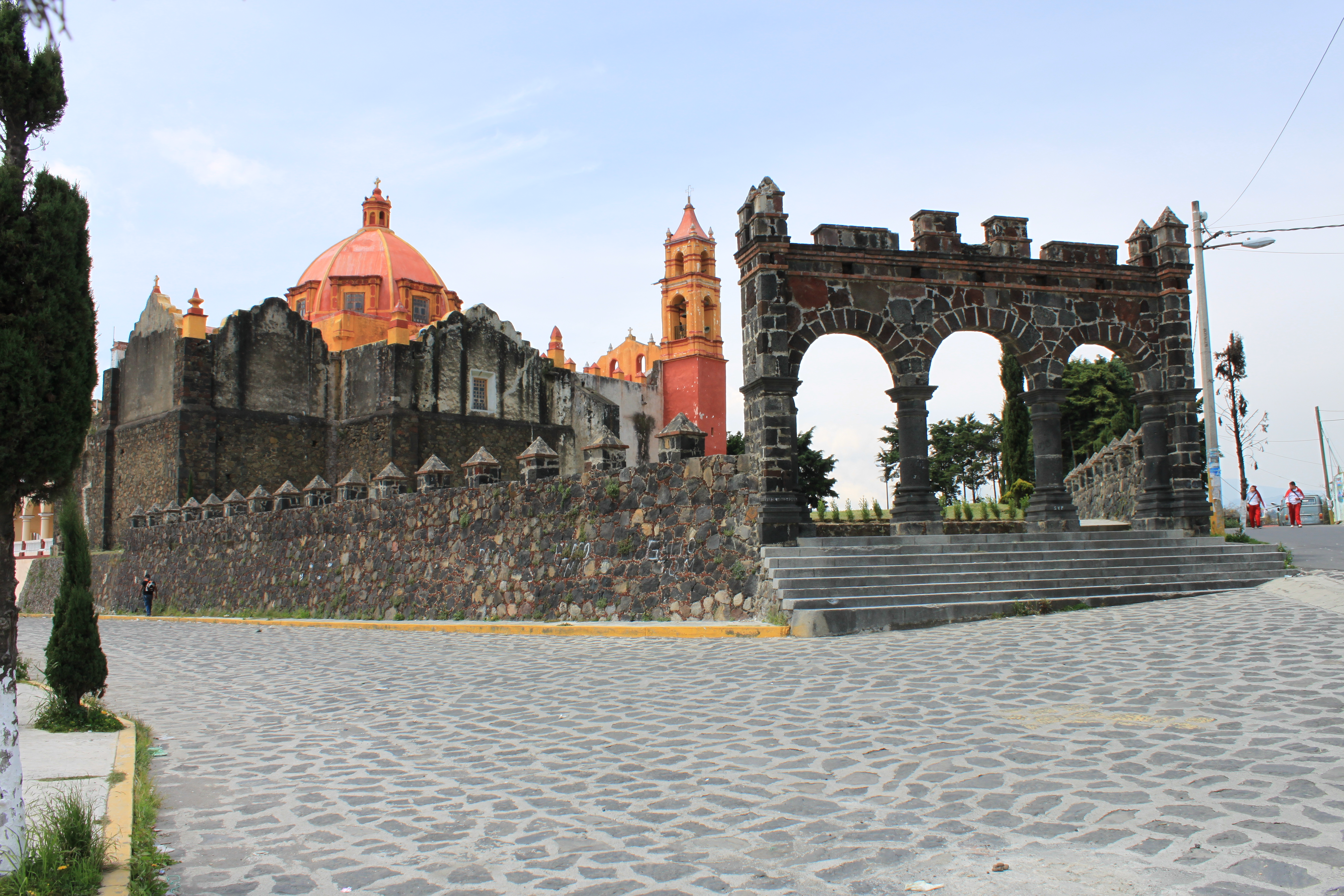
- Church of Saint Stephen in Tepetlixpa

- Location within State of Mexico Location within Mexico
- Coordinates: 19°0′2″N 98°49′04″W
- Country: Mexico
- State: Mexico (state)
- Municipal Seat: Village of Tepetlixpa

Area
  - Total: 46.68 km^{2} (18.02 sq mi)

Population (2020)
  - Total: 20,500
- Time zone: UTC-6 (Central)
- Postal code: 56880
- Website: tepetlixpa.gob.mx

Tepetlixpa is a municipality in the State of Mexico in Mexico. The municipality covers an area of 46.68 km^{2} (18.02 sq mi) and borders on the state of Morelos.

In 2000, the municipality had a total population of 16,871. By 2020, the figure had risen to 20,500.

== Nepantla de Sor Juana Inés de la Cruz ==
The municipality is home to Nepantla de Sor Juana Inés de la Cruz, formerly known as San Miguel Nepantla, the hometown of Sor Juana Inés de la Cruz.

At his request, the ashes of Argentine-Mexican poet Juan Gelman were scattered in Nepantla.
