= Area codes in Mexico by code (500–599) =

The 500–599 range of area codes in Mexico is reserved for the states of Mexico and Hidalgo. The country code of Mexico is 52.

For other areas, see Area codes in Mexico by code.

City	State	Code	Ref.
Chapa de Mota	Mexico State	588	
Dongú	Mexico State	588	
La Esperanza	Mexico State	588	
Loma Alta Taxhimay	Mexico State	588	
Loma Alta	Mexico State	588	
Los Arana	Mexico State	588	
Monte de Peña	Mexico State	588	
San Gabriel Docuan	Mexico State	588	
San Luis Anáhuac (Toriles)	Mexico State	588	
San Martín Cachihuapan	Mexico State	588	
Tenjay	Mexico State	588	
Villa del Carbón	Mexico State	588	
Nextlalpan	Mexico State	591	
San Bartolo Cuautlalpan	Mexico State	591	
San Juan Pueblo Nuevo	Mexico State	591	
Santa María Cuevas (Cuevas)	Mexico State	591	
Tequixquiac	Mexico State	591	
Zitlaltepec	Mexico State	591	
Zumpango	Mexico State	591	
Praderas del Potrero	Hidalgo	591	
Nopaltepec	Mexico State	592	
Otumba	Mexico State	592	
Oxtotipac	Mexico State	592	
San Miguel Jaltepec	Mexico State	592	
Santiago Tolman	Mexico State	592	
Xala	Mexico State	592	
Coyotepec	Mexico State	593	
El Tajuelo	Mexico State	593	
Huehuetoca	Mexico State	593	
Jorobas	Mexico State	593	
Barrio La Cañada	Mexico State	593	
San Miguel Jaguey	Mexico State	593	
Teoloyucan	Mexico State	593	
Ampliación los Angeles	Mexico State	594	
San Marcos Nepantla	Mexico State	594	
San Martín de las Pirámides	Mexico State	594	
Teotihuacán	Mexico State	594	
Tepexpan	Mexico State	594	
Tezoyuca	Mexico State	594	
Xometla	Mexico State	594	
Santiago Cuautlalpan	Mexico State	595	
Chiconcuac de Juárez	Mexico State	595	
San Bernardino	Mexico State	595	
San Bernardo Tlalmimilolpan	Mexico State	595	
San Jerónimo Amanalco	Mexico State	595	
San Miguel Tlaixpan	Mexico State	595	
San Salvador Atenco	Mexico State	595	
Santo Tomás Apipilhuasco	Mexico State	595	
Tepetitlán	Mexico State	595	
Tepetlaoxtoc	Mexico State	595	
Tequexquinahuac	Mexico State	595	
Texcoco de Mora	Mexico State	595	
Los Reyes Acozac	Mexico State	596	
San Luis Tecuahutitlán	Mexico State	596	
San Miguel Atlamajac	Mexico State	596	
Temascalapa	Mexico State	596	
Amecameca	Mexico State	597	
Juchitepec	Mexico State	597	
Nepantla de Sor Juana Inés de la Cruz	Mexico State	597	
Ozumba	Mexico State	597	
Pahuacan	Mexico State	597	
San Andrés Tlalamac	Mexico State	597	
San Rafael	Mexico State	597	
Tenango del Aire	Mexico State	597	
Tlalmanalco	Mexico State	597	
Apaxco	Mexico State	599	
Hueypoxtla	Mexico State	599	
Jilotzingo	Mexico State	599	
San Francisco Zacacalco	Mexico State	599	
Santa María Ajoloapan	Mexico State	599	
Tlapanaloya	Mexico State	599	
