= El Crucero, Tequixquiac =

El Crucero
- Town
- Location within State of Mexico
- Coordinates: 19°54′9″N 99°8′7″W
- Country: Mexico
- State: State of Mexico
- Region: Zumpango Region
- Municipality: Tequixquiac
- Founded: 1954

Area
  - Total: 10.83 km^{2} (4.18 sq mi)
- Elevation (of seat): 2,230 m (7,320 ft)

Population (2010)
  - Town: 134
- Time zone: UTC-6 (CST)
- Postal code (of seat): 55654
- Website: http://www.tequixquiac.gob.mx/

El Crucero is a village in the Tequixquiac municipality, Mexico State in Mexico. The town is bordered on the north La Heredad Ranch, south to the town of Santiago Tequixquiac, east town of Tlapanaloya and west by the Apaxco municipality.
