= Santiago Apóstol Parish (Tequixquiac) =

- Santiago Apóstol Parish
- 19°54′37″N 99°08′51″W
- Location: Santiago Tequixquiac
- Country: Mexico
- Denomination: Roman Catholic

History
- Status: Parish
- Consecrated: 1590

Santiago Apóstol parish is the Catholic church and parish house of the people of downtown Santiago Tequixquiac, in the Diocese of Cuautitlán in Mexico It is dedicated to Saint James Apostle and includes a sanctuary where the image of Lord of the Chapel is venerated. It is located in the center of town, near Plaza Cuautémoc, by Juárez Avenue. The colonial building in the municipality of Tequixquiac is a monument of great architectural importance, remaining intact to this day.

== History ==
The viceregal government directed this construction in Teotlalpan. It had the Franciscans build chapels in the encomiendas around which the Chichimeca Indians were settled. The church of Santiago Tequixquiac had authority over the new villages of San Mateo Hueycalco, San Sebastián Tlalachco, San Francisco Apazco and others, by order of the archbishop of Mexico City. The first Christian church was constructed in 1569 but destroyed by a rebellion of the indigenousr people. It became a formal parish in 1590, the first priest being a Spanish Franciscan, Juan Arias de León.

In 1650, the commissioner of the Inquisition of New Spain founded Tequixquiac town with the priest Nicolás de Arellano in charge, to address all issues of importance on the behavior of people around the parish and other towns. Here judgments were dictated principally against Spaniards and Mestizos. No executions were carried out here. It acted rather to mediate between the races, to oversee behavior, and to settle disputes over land and boundaries, as well as irregularities in jobs and tax revenue at mines. The problems considered serious were referred to the Palace of Holy Office or Inquisitor in Mexico City. Serious issues included bigamy, theft, murder, taxes evasion, sodomy, antagonism to the Roman Catholic Church, Sephardi or Jewish practices, or witchcraft.

This region contained lime mines and stone mines for construction. One of the most common complaints was the exploitation of indigenous people, who were forced into labor, with mistreatment end in clashes and deaths. The priest Felix de Peñafiel redacted the Suma de Visitas in this parish for the Archbishop. It covers the number of inhabitants, the matters of Christian doctrine taught in Spanish, Nahuatl, and Otomi, complaints about lands, and the records of baptisms and of attendance at religious services.

During a drought, a sculpture of the "Señor de la Capilla" (Our Lord of the Chapel) was brought over to Tequixquiac from Apaxco. When the drought broke, the image was not returned, presumably because it was made of fiber and had grown too heavy to carry. It has remained in this town, and has many miracles attributed to it.

=== 19th century and 20th century ===
In 1804, the German explorer Alexander von Humboldt visited the town of Tequixquiac to study the topography and geography for drain waters of Mexico City via Zumpango. He observed how In the parish of Saint James Apostle a parish priest was beating the Indian people.

After the independence of Mexico, public events were conducted inside the church: popular celebrations, election of the first mayor of Tequixquiac municipality in 1826, and a vote in 1851 to create the guard that protected the inhabitants, because the army could not protect the people from armed conflicts that were to emerge in the country.

At the outbreak of the revolutionary movement of 1910, the church building was abandoned, the interior used as stables by the military, leading to looting and deterioration. In 1917 the Zapatista army recovered control of the town of Tequixquiac, under Otilio Montaño, and the inhabitants requested the opening of the church. This did not happen during the government of Plutarco Elias Calles, but in 1927 the Mexico State government and the bishopric acceded to the requests of the inhabitants and reopened the Santiago Apóstol Parish church.

In 1990, the 400th anniversary of the founding of Santiago Apóstol parish was celebrated with a party full of folklore and many baptisms, weddings, first communions and confirmations. The government of the State of Mexico and the municipal government helped support cultural events such as classical music, folk dance, theater, marches, and processions, as well as sporting events and traditional cuisine, with people invited from other Mexican states as well as from Spain, Italy and the United States.

=== 21st century and present ===
December 16, 2006, parishioners made an official request for the removal of the pastor for officiating at religious services while intoxicated and for making sexual insinuations to women, at least 20 of whom gave written testimonies.

== Arts ==
=== Architecture ===
This church was constructed in various phases, with an indigenous workforce and the design under religious supervision. The architecture style is named tlaquitqui, because in some elements there are indigenous symbols and concepts.

The facade contains two doorways elaborately decorated in stonework, which includes indigenous symbolism. Both church and town are dedicated to the Apostle James.

This church has great counterforts to support the vault and dome in the form of a Latin cross; the walls are thick to serve as a fortification in case of indigenous rebellions. There is a strong Moorish influence both in the structure and tower, which has a similarity to forms of minarets of Islamic tower art.

The atrium was a large space encased in stone with a cross on top of it, and with Christian and indigenous symbols mixed on its walls. In each of its four corners there are wells and in the center there is an open space with Solomonic columns.

=== Picture ===
The church contains Baroque masterpieces, pictures from the 16th and 17th centuries, with principal themes of St. Michael the Archangel, the Sacred Heart of Jesus, and of purgatory..

There are murals in the domes. In the sacristy dome is a depiction of La crucificción de Jesucristo (Jesus Christ's crucifixion); the dome symbolizes heaven, whence angels, cherubs and saints look on; the central image is Christ being taken down from the cross.

=== Dance ===
The Contradanza de las Varas is a traditional creole dance performed by male parishioners in town celebrations. It is based not on indigenous dances but from northern Spain, between Asturias and Galicia (Spain), on 25 July in honor of the apostle James. In 1652 it was introduced by settlers, as tribute to God, and years later in honor of the Lord of Chapel. The name of contradanza comes from the use of two rose sticks (rosa gallica) that have colored ribbons with figures that become the rhythm of the dance steps.

Another dance is La Trenza, danced only Mondays in Lord of the Chapel fair, using a colored pole with braided ribbons along with marching band music.

=== Literature ===
Among the first documents written in this parish with an artistic character were Las Loas, poetry inspired by the Lord of the Chapel and later by the Lord of the Agony during Holy Week, a rhetoric of oratory and religious songs that men, since the period viceregal, they sang and prayed to Jesus Christ on the eve of the Resurrection. The Loas are poetic verses that managed to survive to this day, in the popular domain of the inhabitants. Thus successively, the Roman Catholic temple has been a faithful witness to writings such as the formation of the first municipal council in 1814.

Manuel Rodríguez Villegas wrote, in 2023, the novel The Fruits of Holy Land, This Mexican novel was presented at the Book fair of Madrid on May 27, 2023. The events that he narrates take place in the parish of Santiago Apóstol during the Viceroyalty of New Spain and have as their protagonist was Ester Silva, a Sephardi Jewish converted to a Christian Roman Catholic who emigrated from Seville with her husband and settled in the town of Tequixquiac. In the parish, several happy and tragic events occur in the life of that family, touching on religious as well as historical themes in a time of intolerance, resulting in the emergence of new New Spain Catholicism.

== People ==
- Alexander von Humboldt visited the town of Tequixquiac to study the topography and geography for drain waters of Mexico City via Zumpango. He observed how In the parish of Saint James Apostle a parish priest was beating the Indian people.
- Fortino Hipólito Vera y Talonia, born and baptized at Santiago Tequixquiac, was one of the first bishops of Cuernavaca. His remains are inside this church, returned from Cuernavaca to Santiago Tequixquiac in 1938.

== Priest's chronology ==
Priest	Period	Priest	Period
(Mexico) Narciso Prestegui	1948–1949	(Mexico) Fernando H. Recobos	1981–1982
(Mexico) José Durán	1949	(Mexico) Fernando Arenas	1982–1993
(Italy) Nazario Gavotto	1949	(Mexico) Samuel Montoya	1993–1995
(Mexico) Carlos Vidal	1949	(Mexico) Víctor Ramírez	1995–2003
(Mexico) Eduardo Aguilar	1949–1950	(Mexico) Cástulo Teheran	2007–2008
(Mexico) Santiago Domínguez	1950–1951	(Mexico) José Dolores Hernández	2008–2009
(Mexico) Hilarión Landa	1951–1955	(Mexico) Jesús de Guadalupe Olmos	2009–2012
(Mexico) Antonio Arreola	1955	(Mexico) Agustín Marcelino Gómez	2012–2016
(Mexico) Pedro González	1955–1956	(Romania) Isidor Tălmăcel Paicu	2016–2020
(Spain) Saturnino Sanabria	1956–1959	(Mexico) Martín González Soria	2020–2021
(Mexico) Jesús Meza	1959–1961	(Mexico) Emiliano Rafael Morlan Linares	2021
(Mexico) Federíco Ávalos	1961–1981		

== See also ==
- Teotlalpan
- Spanish missions in Mexico

== Bibliography ==
- La conquista espiritual en Tequixquiac, Miguel Ángel Olvera Vázquez, No.1 (El señor de la capilla) Enero-Marzo de 2007.
- Monografía Municipal de Tequixquiac, Rodríguez Peláez María Elena, 1999.
