= Hueypoxtla Municipality =

Coordinates: 19°55′N 99°03′W

Hueypoxtla
- Municipality
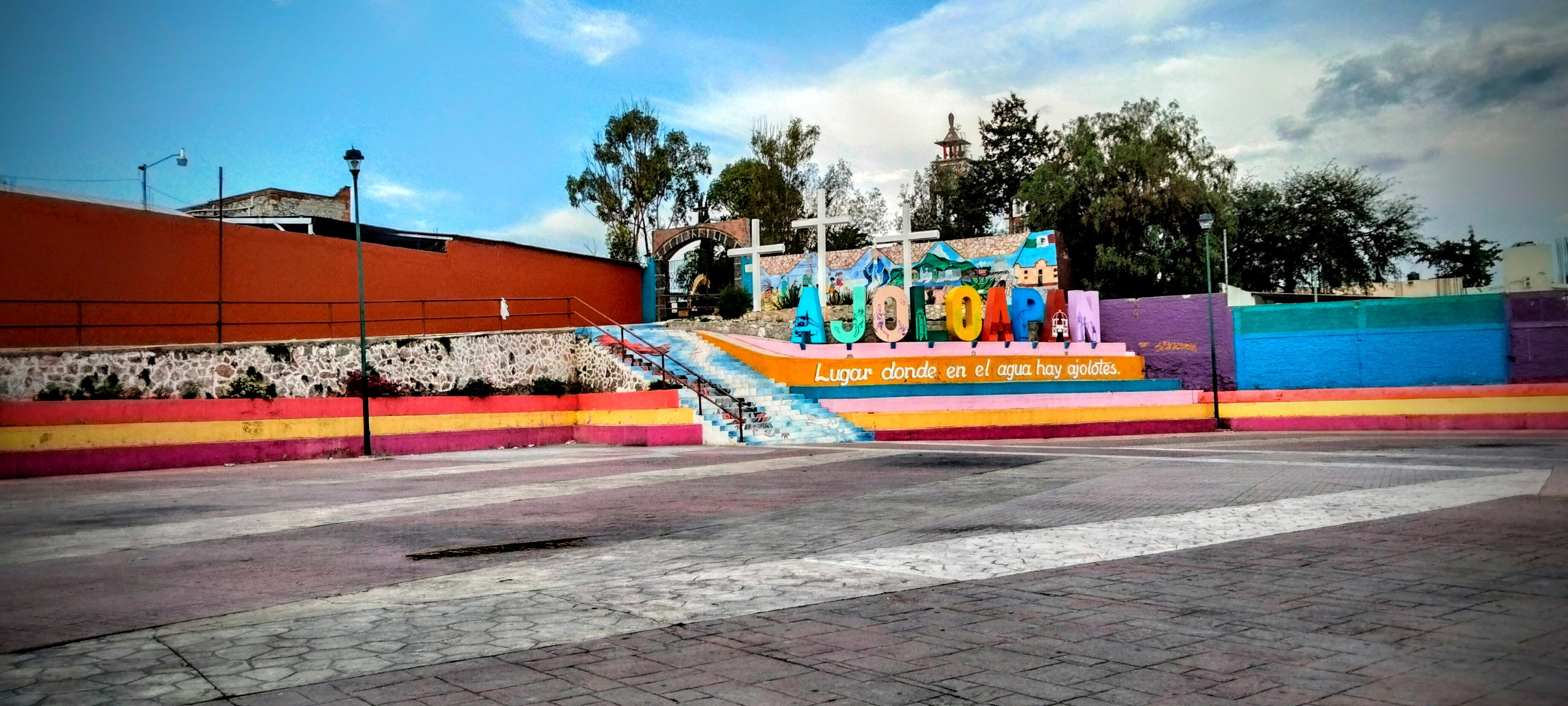
- Town of Santa Maria Ajoloapan

- Country: Mexico
- State: Mexico State
- Municipal seat: Hueypoxtla

Population
  - Total: 39,864
- Time zone: UTC-6 (CST)

Hueypoxtla is a municipality situated in the Zumpango Region, which is located in the northeastern part of the state of Mexico in Mexico. The municipality is positioned at a northern pass that serves as an exit from the Valley of Mexico and Mezquital Valley. The name "Hueypoxtla" originates from Nahuatl and translates to "place of great merchants".

== Geography ==

It is located between the parallels 99° 27’ 51” and 99° 37’ 32” west longitude, and 18° 41’ 35” and 18° 55’ 22” north latitude. Hueypoxtla borders Zumpango. It covers a total surface area of 201.54 km^{2} at an altitude of 6,634 ft. In the 2005 census by INEGI, it reported a population of 39,864.

The municipal seat of Hueypoxtla governs the following communities or towns: Santa María Ajolopan, San Francisco Zacacalco, Tinguistongo, Guadalupe Nopala, Emiliano Zapata, and Casa Blanca. The municipality borders the municipalities of Apaxco, Tequixquiac, Zumpango, as well as the state of Hidalgo (Tizayuca, Tolcayuca, San Agustín Tlaxiaca, and Ajacuba).

The Río Salado of Hueypoxtla river is connected to the Gran Canal.

While the municipal seat is located in a small, elongated valley, most of the municipality transitions from the Valley of Mexico to the Mezquital Valley. The highest mountain in the area is Picacho in the Sierra Tezontlalpa, rising 2,800 metres (9,200 ft) above sea level. It is situated on the border with the Apaxcomunicipality.

=== Flora and fauna ===
Hueypoxtla is a large municipality that encompasses various geographical features. It includes a portion of the Sierra de Tetzontlalpan , a mountainous region characterized by the presence of oak, yucca, huizache, mesquite and pirul trees. The municipality also has semi-desert plains known as Lomas de España (Spain plains), which are shared with the Zumpango municipality.

The flora in the area consists of fruit trees such as capulin, white zapote, avocado, tejocote, as well as various types of cacti including prickly pears and chollas. During the colonial period, settlers introduced olive trees, pomegranates, figs, and vineyards to the region, taking into account the soil acidity.

As for the fauna, Hueypoxtla is home to a diverse range of animals. Some of the notable species include the cacomistle, skunk, opossum, bobcat, coyote, rabbit, hare, tand a variety of bird species such as the turkey vulture, falcon, eagle, quail, owl, roadrunner and crow. Additionally, the area is inhabited by various types of insects and reptiles.

== History ==
Hueypoxtla has a rich geological and archaeological history. Fossils of plants and animal species from the Cretaceous period have been discovered in the area, indicating its ancient past. While there is no direct evidence of human presence in the municipality, the proximity to Tequixquiac, where significant archaeological findings such as the sacrum bone of Tequixquiac have been made, suggests that humans may have inhabited the region.

Around 1219 the altepetl (city-state) of Hueypoxtla was established by Chichimecas a group of indigenous people. The settlement was founded in a location called Iztatzacuala by a Chichimeca man named Huitzitl. Subsequently, the Nahuas and Otomis, two other indigenous groups, founded Teotlalpan in the same region. It is believed that the name Teotlalpan may have been derived from the lime-rich areas found there, which were used for constructing teocallis, structures used for religious activities in ancient Mesoamerican cultures.

== Communication and transport ==
The Arco Norte is a major highway that runs near Hueypoxtla and connects Atlacomulco to San Martín Texmelucan. Santa María Ajoloapan provides toll access to the highway.

== Politics ==
Mayor	Time
Diego Vargas Colin	2009–2012
Francisco Santillán Santillán	2012–2015
Adrián Reyes Oropeza	2016–

== Economy ==
The economy of Hueypoxtla is primarily based on farming, cattle rearing, and small businesses, with a focus on the production of corn, beans, and fruit. The municipality attracts tourists with its favorable climate, notable churches, and ecotourism attractions. Additionally, there is an unexplored archaeological zone in the area.

== Demography ==
=== Populated places in Hueypoxtla ===
Town	Population
Total	39,864
Santa María Ajoloapan	9,185
San Marcos Jilotzingo	8,523
San Francisco Zacacalco	7,420
Hueypoxtla	3,989
Guadalupe Nopala	
San José Bata (Emiliano Zapata)	
Tianguistongo	
Tezontlalpa de Zapata	

== Culture ==
=== Monuments ===
- Assumption of Mary Parish in Santa María Ajoloapan town.
- Saint Bartholomew Parish in Hueypoxtla town.
- Saint Mark Evangelist Parish is in San Marcos Jilotzingo town.
- Saint Francis of Assisi Church is in San Francisco Zacacalco.
- Presa Luis Espinoza de Hueypoxtla is a dam built in the 19th century.
- Casa Blanca hacienda is a Spanish building connecting with other haciendas and old towns.

== People ==
- Javier Ramirez Flores, a respected man at the age of 94 (2018), has contributed greatly to the education platform in Hueypoxtla. Many educational facilities have been enforced through his effort. He was close to a superintendent of schools throughout this region. A primary school in Hueypoxtla was named in his name. Not to miss, Javier Ramirez was also once Municipal President of Hueypoxtla.
- Narciso García Flores, teacher, poet and writer, was an intellectual of Mexican Revolution.

== See also ==
- Teotlalpan
