= Lord of the Chapel =

The Lord of the Chapel, (in Spanish as Señor de la Capilla and Otomi as Zidada Nikjä), is a statue of the crucifixion of Jesus from Saint James Apostle parish in Santiago Tequixquiac, Mexico. The image is popularly believed to have placated any further disaster caused by illness and epidemics with Indigenous people. It became the patron saint of Santiago Tequixquiac, and is one of the most well-known images in Mexico State. It was probably created in Actopan ex-monastery by native artists around 1570, and is made of mixed materials, including sticks, plaques of agave fiber, and plaster. The author is unknown and belongs to the Spanish colonial period.

The Christ image dates from the first half of the seventeenth century and measures 1.73 meters high. There is a strong relationship with Cryptojudaism because in this town its first Iberian inhabitants were Sephardic converts to Christianity arrived with Hernán Cortés; in the face of the image are very obvious a rabbinical signs, one of them are payots or curls in the side hair.

== History ==
During the Spanish colonial period, several Christs, carved with cane paste, were sculpted; it was an indigenous sculptural tradition that prevailed in New Spain when constructing lighter religious images; These Christs were in various parishes of the region, one in El Arenal, Actopan (Lord of the Wonders), anothers in the village of Visitación (Lord of Tlapala), in Amecameca (Lord of the Sacromonte) and other in Chalma (Lord of Chalma). This image was inside a chapel in Saint Francis parish, in the town of Apaxco that later the image was moved to the people from Tequixquiac until our days.

== Description ==
The image has a cross made of walnut and details of ivory called tablets that were brought from the Philippines.
