= Symbols of Tequixquiac =

The symbols of Tequixquiac, Mexico, were adopted as oficial symbols of the municipality in 2003.

== Coat of arms ==
Seal of Tequixquiac.

The image of a water channel is represented on the Tequixquiac shield, with tequesquite and two volutes of water. Officially, the toponym glyph of the town of Tequixquiac was authorized as a municipal shield, it is the first symbol that the municipality acquires, it was stylized and formalized under the guidelines of the state government (without pigments and with more defined lines) for use on official letterhead and seal of every document sent within the municipality, this glyph is also called the municipal shield, chapter 3 of the Bando Municipal describes the characteristics of said emblem.

The name comes from Nahuatl and means "place of tequesquite waters". The origin of the word Tequixquiac dates back to the pre-Hispanic period, its translation derives from Nahuatl language, it means from Nahua words; tequixquitl = tequesquite (saltpeter), atl = water and -co = place.

=== History ===
Historically, the municipality lacked its own official symbols; During a state program, in 1986, Tequixquiac adopted an official glyph or letterhead, alluding to the Nahuatl name of the municipality, for official use; The glyph is represented by a cut of a channel in the shape of a tequexquite without pigments, a symbol taken from the tribute codex.

== Flag ==
Tequixquiac
- Adopted: 30 January 2017
- Design: A vertical tricolor of green lime, white, and blue with the Coat of arms of Tequixquiac in the center

The flag of Tequixquiac, the respective flag of the Tequixquiac Municipality, and flag of certain seat departments. The flag is a vertical tricolor in lime green, white, and blue and charged in the center bar with the coat of arms of Tequixquiac in black. The tricolor design is derived from the flag of the Flag of Mexico in 2017.
