= Cerro Mesa Ahumada =

- Location within State of Mexico Location within Mexico

Highest point
- Elevation: 2,600 m (8,500 ft)
- Coordinates: 19°54′4″N 99°11′11″W

Naming
- English translation: Mesa Ahumada Hill
- Language of name: Spanish

Geography
- Location: Tequixquiac, Apaxco, Huehuetoca; State of Mexico

Cerro Mesa Ahumada (Mesa Ahumada Hill), also known as Cerro Colorado, is a hill located in the northern region of the State of Mexico (Estado de Mexico or Edomex). It is located between the municipalities of Tequixquiac and Apaxco.

This hill has a maximum elevation of 2,600 metres (8,500 ft) above sea level and is located at a southern pass leading out of the Mezquital Valley.

== Geology ==
This hill once had natural springs running down but has since then dried up. The land is mainly composed of volcanic rock, and the soil is classified as durisol, phaeozem, and vertisol.

== Archaeological Site ==
On the high mesa, there is an archaeological site named Los Mogotes. It was occupied by Otomian-Nahua tribes. A few simple pre-Hispanic basements still exists on the northwest side of the mesa, along with some petroglyphs on the rocks.

Los Mogotes was discovered in 1984 by the locals. When archaeologists from INAH visited this area, it was located on the hillside of Cerro Mesa Ahumada at approximately 2,250 metres (7,380 ft) above sea level.

Los Mogotes has 8 basements and a small platform, corresponding to the so-called Coyotlatelco and Mazapa of the late classic or epiclassical period (800-1000 a.C).

This site was possibly built for military activities for lookouts by the Chichimeca people with astronomical observations, funeral activities, and housing. The location has suffered from looting, but archaeologists found valuable items such as obsidian, stone utensils, human bones, and mud bow.

The eastern hillsides have petroglyphs, anthropomorphic figures of men and women, the engraving of Tōnatiuh or Tonalli, a Nahui Ollin, and concentric cross symbols that probably represent stars or locations.

The surroundings of the mesa were probably used by many nomadic groups, soldiers, and merchants, to observe the valleys. So it was an important location to defend and keep watch.

In Tequixquiac (altepetl) many clashes occurred with Otomis, Aztecs, Tlaxcaltecs, Texcoco, and Otumba people. This site on the mesa was necessary for watching out for people and warriors.

== Flora & Fauna ==
Cerro Mesa Ahumada is in the Central Mexican Plateau, where there is a diversity in plants and animals due to the region's temperate and semi-arid climate.

The native plants and trees in this area include:

Native Plants: Century Plant, Cholla, Prickly Pear, Golden Barrel Cactus, Fencepost Cactus, Bilberry Cactus, Mexican Creeping Zinnia, Creosote Bush, Pipicha, Creeping False Holly, Tule, Reed, Barrel Cactus, and Fern.

Trees: Kidneywood Tree, Mesquite, Netleaf oak (also known as Quercus Rugosa), Tepozán, Needle Bush

Fruit Trees: Tejocote, Capulin, and White Sapote.

Foreign Trees: Pirul and Eucalypt.

The fauna in Mesa Ahumada include:

Mammals: Cacomistle, Skunk, Gopher, Virginia Opossum, Rabbit, Mexican Gray Squirrel, Bat, and Mexican Hare.

Native birds: Turkey, Colibri, Turkey Vulture, Northern mockingbird, The Red Warbler, Rufous-crowned Sparrow, Lesser Roadrunner, Great Horned Owl, and Savannah Sparrow.

Reptiles: Rattlesnake, Pine Snake, Xincoyote, and Chirrionera Snake.

Amphibians: Axolotl, Frog, and Toad.

Insects: Red Ant, Bee, Firefly, etc.

A few animals have gone extinct and existed in the past. These include Coyote, Bobcat and Gray Fox.

== Hillside Sports ==
The landscape around this hill is often used by international sports competitions such as Vuelta Sacra, a mountain bike competition.

== Environmental Damage ==
The landscape has degraded to a great extent, mainly due to an attempt at urban development in several parts of Ahumada hill.

A construction company, Wilk SA, planned to construct housing units in several parts of Ahumada hill by invading the natural landscape. And this was possible due to negligence and corruption of the PAN and PRI, Tequixquiac, and Apaxco mayors.

Such development has deteriorated the natural environment over the years.

== See also ==
- Tula (Mesoamerican site)
- Cerro Ponzha
- Xaltocan
