= Area code 664 (Mexico) =

Mexican area code

664 is an area code in the national telephone numbering plan of Mexico (Plan Nacional de Numeracion) for the municipality of Tijuana. It overlays area code 663.
