= Francisco Plancarte y Navarrete =

The Most Reverend Francisco Plancarte y Navarrete
- Archbishop of Linares-Monterrey
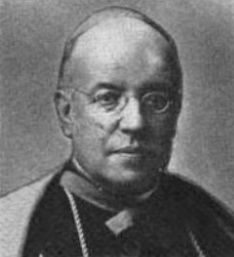
- See: Linares-Monterrey
- Installed: November 30, 1911
- Term ended: June 2, 1920
- Predecessor: Santiago de los Santos Garza Zambrano
- Successor: José Juan de Jesús Herrera y Piña
- Previous posts: Bishop of Cuernavaca (1898-1911); Bishop of Campeche (1896-1898)

Orders
- Ordination: 1880
- Consecration: September 17, 1895 by Cardinal Vannutelli

Personal details
- Born: October 21, 1856 Zamora, Michoacán, Mexico
- Died: June 2, 1920 (aged 63) Monterrey, Nuevo Leon, Mexico
- Denomination: Roman Catholic Church
- Parents: Jesus Plancarte Labastida and Maria de los Angeles Navarrete
- Education: Pontifical Latin American College

Francisco Plancarte y Navarrete (October 21, 1856 – June 2, 1920) was born in Zamora, Michoacán, Mexico, the son of Jesus Plancarte Labastida and Maria de los Angeles Navarrete. He had two younger sisters, Maria Gertrudis and Maria Benita Virginia. According to his baptismal certificate, dated October 27, 1856, he was called José Francisco Hilarión. He grew up in a very religious family, and at the age of thirteen, support by his uncle, Antonio Plancarte y Labastida, he entered the Pontifical Latin American College in Rome. During the thirteen years that he lived in Europe doing his ecclesiastical studies, he visited museums, ruins and ancient monuments, and he observed archeological digs.

== Education and priesthood ==
On his return to Mexico, he immediately began directing the College of San Luis in Jacona, Michoacan, a school that Plancarte y Labastida had founded, and later he became a professor at the seminary in Mexico City. He made excavations in Michoacán, in the Federal District, in Morelos and elsewhere; He collected objects that were classified and formed a collection of 2,800 pieces, exhibited today in the National Museum of Anthropology as the Plancarte Collection. Along with Vicente Riva Palacio and Francisco del Paso y Troncoso, he took the collection to Madrid and exhibited it at the Columbian Exposition held in 1892.

== First bishop of Campeche ==
On September 17, 1895, he was appointed by Pope Leo XIII first Bishop of Campeche. He was consecrated in Rome by the Cardinal Vannutelli. According to historian Aarón Enrique Pérez Durán, in Plancarte's first pastoral letter as Bishop of Campeche, signed on Easter Sunday, April 5, 1896, in Rome, he confesses how he had his first approaches with Campeche, with its Mayan heritage, with the courage of those generations that fought against the conquerors or fought heroically against the pirates. He mentions how he learned about Pedro Sainz de Baranda y Borreiro, who defeated a Spanish convoy when it sieged Fort San Juan de Ulúa in Veracruz in 1825. Plancarte writes about the prosperous maritime trade, and about the men of science who were trained in the Campechan schools, which made him fall in love with Campeche even before the Pope appointed him bishop. Plancarte assumed his duties as head of the diocese on November 26, 1896.

While in Campeche, Plancarte continued his archaeological studies. He formed a second collection of ancient Mexican objects, similar to those of the first, among them a large, beautiful jade glass; he visited and studied Yucatan ruins and descended to the depths of a cenote. While in Madrid he was named a knight of the Order of Isabella the Catholic.

== Second Bishop of Cuernavaca ==
Two years later in November 1898, Plancarte was recommended as the second Bishop of Cuernavaca, Morelos. Upon his transfer to Cuernavaca, he founded the College of Santa Inés and Santa Cecilia, the Official Gazette and the "Ecclesiastical Magazine". He was an active participant in the Latin American Plenary Council where he served as official rapporteur.

In Morelos, Plancarte continued his archaeological studies. He writes about how he found archaeological pieces "on the Hacienda of Zacatepec and in my own backyard [the cathedral garden, which is now Revolution Park]... in Cuernavaca, in Teposltlan (sic)... all over the state of Morelos. In 1909 he published Apuntes para la geografía del Estado de Morelos (Notes about the geography of the State of Morelos), and in 1911 he published Tamoanchán: el estado de Morelos y el principio de la civilización en México (Tamoanchán: the state of Morelos and the beginning of civilization in Mexico). The latter drew upon both Plancarte's studies and upon the chronicles of Fray Bernardino de Sahagún; in it, he concludes that Tamoanchan, the mythological cradle of civilization in Mexico, is located in the modern state of Morelos in south-central Mexico.

With the 1911 publication of Tamoanchan, Plancarte developed a rich ethnography; he also established a museum with valuable archaeological samples, much of which was lost during the Mexican Revolution. In addition, he built an astronomical observatory in La Casa de la Torre, which is the Robert Brady Museum today.

== Fourth Archbishop of Linares-Monterrey ==
On November 30, 1911, Pope Pius X promoted Plancarte to the Archdiocese of Monterrey, and he moved there on May 5, 1912. Despite setbacks such as the destruction of the San Francisco church and the Convent of San Andrés in Monterrey and a typhoid epidemic, he developed great pastoral action, created new parishes and cared for the formation of seminarians, sending some to study in Rome. Because of the conflicts of the Carrancista revolution, he left Monterrey and lived in Chicago for four years. He took advantage of the exile to write his books on prehistory and protohistory of Mexico. When he returned to Monterrey in 1919 he became a founding member of the Mexican Academy of History. Due to diabetes, his health declined and he died in Monterrey on June 2, 1920.

== Works published ==
- Apuntes para la geografía del Estado de Morelos, (1909).
- Tamoanchán: el estado de Morelos y el principio de la civilización en México, (1911).
- Colección de documentos inéditos y raros para la historia eclesiástica mexicana.
- Antonio Plancarte y Labastida, abad de Santa María de Guadalupe: su vida, sacada principalmente de sus escritos, (1914).
- Prehistoria de México, (posthumous, 1923).

== Legacy ==
Although archaeologists today reject most of Plancarte's ideas about the ulmecas (Olmecs) and Tamoanchan, Lucía Martínez Moctezuma and Carlos Capistrán, writing in inventio: La genesis de la cultura universitario de Morelos (March, 2009), note, "The ideas of Plancarte and Navarrete left their mark on the imaginary of the first generations of Morelos. In different works written during the twentieth century you can see its use." They point out that Salvador Rojas (Elementos de geografía e historia del estado de Morelos, (1931)) [Elements of geography and history of the state of Morelos] references Plancarte, as do a Morelos state monograph from 1961, a 1985 state monograph published for sixth grade teachers, Somos Morelenses (We are Morelenses), and the official 1991 textbook for elementary school students, Morelos: nieve en la cima, fuego en el cañaveral (Morelos: Snow at the summit, Fire in the cane fields). Martinez and Capistran conclude that, "Although almost one hundred years have elapsed since the publication of [Plancarte's] studies in his textbooks and in his Tamoánchan, and despite the postrevolutionary attempts to break with the legacy of the Porfirian cultural elite, his ideas remain valid at least in the Morelense cultural imaginary."

A virtual library called "Mons. Francisco Plancarte y Navarrete" was opened on July 2, 2020 in the Museo Arquidiocesano del Arte Sacro (Archdiocese Museum of Sacred Art) (MAAS) at the Roman Catholic Archdiocese of Monterrey. The library consists of 6,001 books over 100 years old, covering theology, literature, history, law, canon law, language teaching, engineering, and other areas. In addition to Latin and Spanish, there are books in other languages, such as Nahuatl.

== See also ==
- Roman Catholic Archdiocese of Monterrey
- Roman Catholic Diocese of Campeche
- Roman Catholic Diocese of Cuernavaca
- List of people from Morelos

Catholic Church titles
New office	Bishop of Campeche; 1896 – 1898	Succeeded by Rómulo Betancourt y Torres
Preceded by Fortino Hipólito Vera y Talonia	Bishop of Cuernavaca; 1898 – 1911	Succeeded by Manuel Fulcheri y Pietrasanta
Preceded by Santiago de los Santos Garza Zambrano	Archbishop of Monterrey; 1912-1920	Succeeded by José Juan de Jesús Herrera y Piña
