= José de Jesús García Ayala =

- Bishop of Campeche (Emeritus)
- Church: Roman Catholic Church
- See: Campeche
- In office: 1967 - 1982
- Predecessor: Alberto Mendoza y Bedolla
- Successor: Héctor González Martínez
- Previous post(s): Auxiliary Bishop of Campeche; Bishop

Orders
- Ordination: May 9, 1937

Personal details
- Born: May 30, 1910; Yurécuaro, Michoacán, Mexico
- Died: January 16, 2014 (aged 103)

José de Jesús García Ayala (May 30, 1910 – January 15, 2014) was a Mexican bishop of the Roman Catholic Church.

== Biography ==
García Ayala was born in Yurécuaro, Michoacán, and was ordained a priest of Zamora, Michoacán on May 9, 1937. He was appointed Auxiliary Bishop of Campeche and titular bishop of Lacedaemon on May 21, 1963, and he received his episcopal consecration on August 2, 1963. García Ayala was installed as Bishop of Campeche on May 10, 1967, and resigned from that position on February 9, 1982
