= Diocese of Campeche =

Latin Catholic diocese in Mexico

Coordinates: 19.8461°N 90.5362°W

Diocese of Campeche Dioecesis Campecorensis Diócesis de Campeche
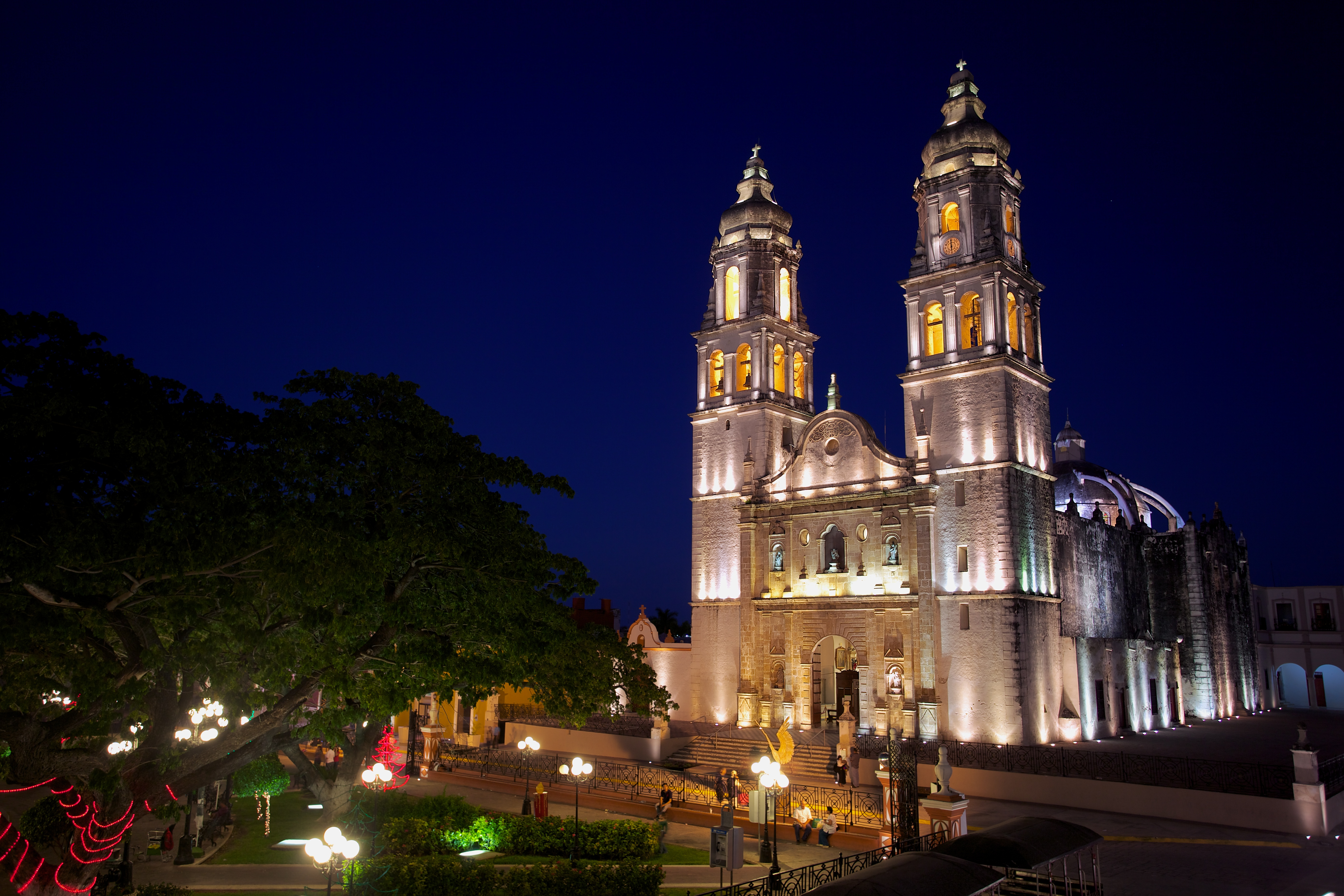
- Catedral de Nuestra Señora de la Purísima Concepción

Location
- Country: Mexico
- Ecclesiastical province: Province of Yucatán
- Metropolitan: Campeche, Campeche

Statistics
- Area: 21,575 sq mi (55,880 km^{2})
- Population: Total; Catholics: (as of 2006); 760,000; 608,000 (80%)
- Parishes: 35

Information
- Denomination: Catholic Church
- Sui iuris church: Latin Church
- Rite: Roman Rite
- Established: 24 March 1895 (131 years ago)
- Cathedral: Cathedral of Our Lady of the Immaculate Conception

Current leadership
- Pope: Leo XIV
- Bishop: José Alberto González Juárez
- Metropolitan Archbishop: Gustavo Rodríguez Vega

The Diocese of Campeche (Latin: Dioecesis Campecorensis) (erected 24 March 1895) is a Latin Church diocese of the Catholic Church in Mexico. It is a suffragan diocese of the Archdiocese of Yucatán.

== Bishops ==
=== Ordinaries ===
- Francisco Plancarte y Navarrete (1895 – 1898), appointed Bishop of Cuernavaca, Morelos
- Rómulo Betancourt y Torres (1900 – 1901)
- Francisco de Paula Mendoza y Herrera (1904 – 1909), appointed Archbishop of Durango
- Jaime de Anasagasti y Llamas (1909 – 1910)
- Vicente Castellanos y Núñez (1912 – 1921), appointed Bishop of Tulancingo, Hidalgo
- Francisco María González y Arias (1922 – 1931), appointed Bishop of Cuernavaca, Morelos
- Luis Guízar y Barragán (1931 – 1938), appointed Coadjutor Bishop of Saltillo, Coahuila
- Alberto Mendoza y Bedolla (1939 – 1967)
- José de Jesús Garcia Ayala (1967 – 1982), resigned
- Héctor González Martínez (1982 – 1988), appointed Coadjutor Archbishop of Antequera, Oaxaca
- Carlos Suárez Cázares (1988 – 1994), appointed Bishop of Zamora, Michoacán
- José Luis Amezcua Melgoza (1995 – 2005), appointed Bishop of Colima
- Ramón Castro Castro (2006 – 2013), appointed Bishop of Cuernavaca, Morelos
- José Francisco González González (2013 – 2025), appointed Archbishop of Tuxtla Gutiérrez, Chiapas
- José Alberto González Juárez (2026 – Present)

=== Auxiliary bishop ===
- José de Jesús Garcia Ayala (1963-1967), appointed Bishop here

== Episcopal See ==
- Campeche, Campeche
