= San Francisco de Asís Parish (Apaxco) =

- Location: Apaxco
- Country: Mexico
- Denomination: Roman Catholic

History
- Status: Monastery
- Consecrated: 1609

San Francisco de Asís Parish is the Catholic church and parish house of the people of Apaxco de Ocampo. Has always belonged to the Diocese of Cuautitlán in Mexico. This church is located in the center of city. This colonial building is a monument of great architectural importance dedicated to Francis of Assisi.
