= Santa María Ajoloapan =

- Town
- Location within State of Mexico
- Coordinates: 19°58′9″N 99°2′7″W
- Country: Mexico
- State: State of Mexico
- Municipality: Hueypoxtla

Area
  - Total: 10.83 km^{2} (4.18 sq mi)
- Elevation (of seat): 2,100 m (6,900 ft)

Population (2010)
  - Town: 9,185
- Time zone: UTC-6 (CST)
- Website: http://www.hueypoxtla.gob.mx/

Santa María Ajoloapan is a town inside municipality of Hueypoxtla in Mexico State in Mexico. The town is bordered on the north Tianguistongo Town, south to Casa Blanca hacienda, east village San José Bata and west by the town of Coyotillos in Apaxco.
