= Los Bybys =

Mexican musical group

Los Bybys are a Mexican musical group playing in the genres of Cumbia and Tropical. Originating in the town of Tequixquiac they began playing in 1991, and became locally successful, eventually touring also outside of Mexico. Among their hits are “En Tus Manos", "Llorar Llorar Llorar”, “Corazón barato” and “Esa Mujer”. Among the band members are Sergio Ramírez Prado, the lead singer. In 2015 the band's percussionist Édgar Octavio Ramírez Prado disappeared in December 2015 and was found dead in a sewage pool several months later.
