= Sacrum bone of Tequixquiac =

Paleo-Indian sculpture

- Material: Bone
- Created: 16,000 to 9,000 years
- Discovered: 1870; Tequixquiac, State of Mexico, Mexico
- Discovered by: Mariano Barcena
- Present location: Mexico City, Mexico

The Sacrum bone of Tequixquiac is an ancient paleo-Indian sculpture carved in a pleistocene-era bone of a prehistoric camelid. It was discovered by Mexican geologist and botanist Mariano de la Bárcena in 1870 in Tequixquiac, Mexico. The carving, dated around 14,000 BCE to 7,000 B.C.E., is considered among the earliest pieces of art from the North American continent. Although the original purpose of the sculpture is unknown, some scholars have said that the carving held some religious value due to the sacredness of the sacrum bone in later Mesoamerican cultures.

== History ==
This sacrum bone was found in Tequixquiac. The carver was likely nomadic and hunted large animals such as mammoths and gathered fruits as evidenced by archaeological evidence found at the site. According to Bárcena, the carver likely used a sharp instrument to cut the holes.

The artifact was owned privately from 1895 to 1956, and is currently located in the National Museum of Anthropology in Mexico City.
