= Tlapanaloya =

- Town
- Nickname: Tlapa
- Location within State of Mexico
- Coordinates: 19°56′9″N 99°6′7″W
- Country: Mexico
- State: State of Mexico
- Region: Zumpango Region
- Municipality: Tequixquiac
- Founded: 1168
- Municipal Status: 1820

Area
  - Total: 10.83 km^{2} (4.18 sq mi)
- Elevation (of seat): 2,100 m (6,900 ft)

Population (2010)
  - Town: 6,466
- Time zone: UTC-6 (CST)
- Postal code (of seat): 55653
- Website: http://www.tequixquiac.gob.mx/

Tlapanaloya is a town in the municipality of Tequixquiac in Mexico State in Mexico. The town is bordered on the north La Heredad Ranch ranching The Homestead, south to the Tajo de Tequixquiac, east village Hueypoxtla and west by the town of Santiago Tequixquiac. The name Tlapanaloya is a Nahuatl toponymy, means Place where is broken stones, te- is stone, tlapana is to brake, loyan is place.

== Geography ==
The town of Tlapanaloya, is an urban area in the municipality of Tequixquiac. The town is divided in four barrios (neighborhood.) and two colonias ejidales (Agricultural colony).

In Tlapanaloya cross a river Salado de Hueypoxtla, the water most important by irrigation; over hills there are many arroyos and jagueyes.

The orography is formed by hills and plains; the biggest hill is Monte Alto, the Tlapanaloya territory is dry plains of limestone.

== History ==
Tetlapanaloyan was an eleven places of Hueypoxtla province that made a tax payment for the Aztec empire. This site was an Aztec altepetl (village) inhabited by otomi and nahua people.

=== Spanish period ===
In 1542, Tlapanaloya was given in encomienda to Spanish Juan Díaz de Lo Real, he built haciendas over Indian's agricultural lands and pay taxes to Hueypoxtla for Mexico City bishop.

== Government and administrative divisions ==
Tlapanaloya is a town inside Tequixquiac municipality, the government known as Delegación, this town has got regidores (councils) governing with municipal president.

=== Neighborhoods ===
Neighborhood
Tlapanaloya Downtown
La Plazuela
La Rinconada
Monte Alto
La Arenilla

=== Agricultural colonies ===
Agricultural colony
Colonia Francisco I. Madero
Colonia Pajaritos

== Culture ==
=== Historical monuments ===
- La Asunción parish is a most important monument in Tlapanaloya town, is located at main square. It is a Baroque church subject to Cuautitlan Diocese.
- Salado River bridge is a colonial construction by camino real way to Santiago Tequixquiac.
- La Esperanza hacienda is a Spanish building connecting with other haciendas and old towns.
