= Apaxco de Ocampo (town) =

- Municipal Seat
- Location within State of Mexico
- Coordinates: 19°58′24″N 99°10′12″W
- Country: Mexico
- State: State of Mexico
- Region: Zumpango Region
- Municipality: Apaxco
- Founded: 1168
- Elevation: 2,195 m (7,201 ft)

Population (2010)
  - Total: 13,836
- Time zone: UTC-6 (Central Standard Time)
- Postal code (of seat): 55660
- Website: http://www.apaxco.gob.mx/

Apaxco de Ocampo is a town and the municipal seat of the Apaxco municipality, Mexico State in Mexico. The town sits at an elevation of 2,195m. Its population was 13,836 in 2010, and 15,171 as of 2025.
