= Mariano de la Bárcena =

Mexican engineer, botanist and politician

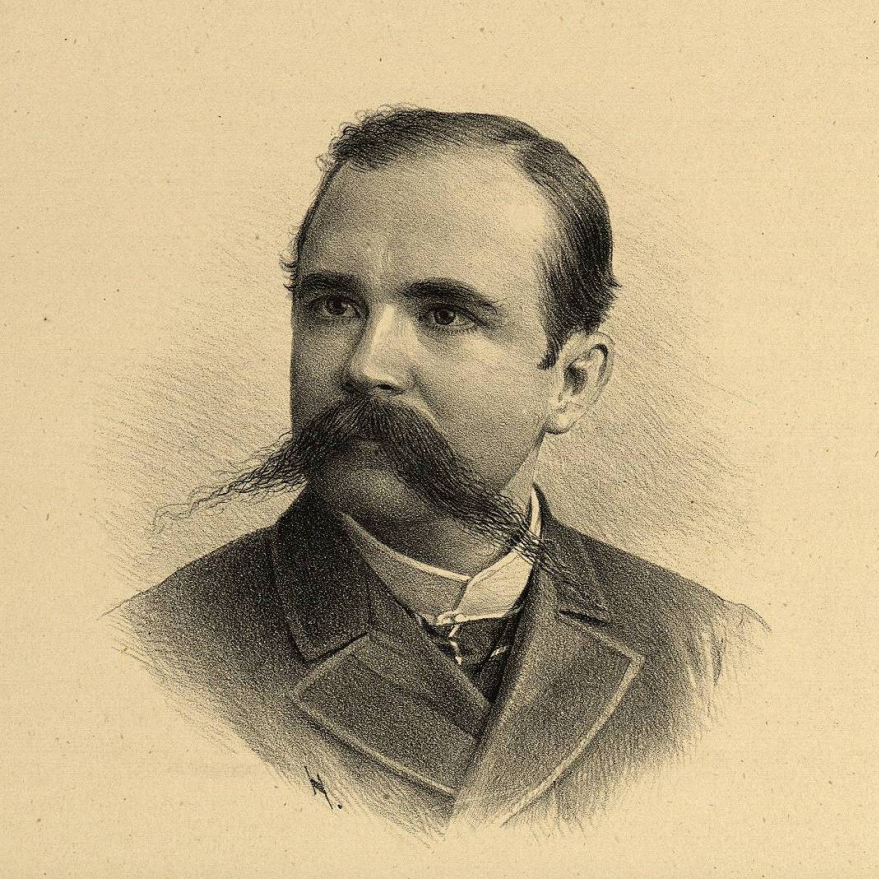
- Born: Mariano Santiago de Jesús de la Bárcena y Ramos; July 22, 1842; Ameca, Jalisco, Mexico
- Died: April 10, 1899 (aged 56); Mexico City, Mexico
- Spouse: Soledad de los Ríos y Arias
- Children: Ana María de la Bárcena; Rosa de la Bárcena; Cristina de la Bárcena

Mariano de la Bárcena (July 22, 1842 – April 10, 1899) was a Mexican engineer, botanist, politician, and interim Governor of Jalisco. He was from Ameca, Jalisco.

== Biography ==
Mariano Santiago de Jesús de la Bárcena y Ramos was born to Don José María de la Bárcena y Villaseñor of Ameca and his third wife Doña María Candelaria Ramos y Célis of Zacoalco. From early youth he devoted himself to study and research in natural sciences. Many of his works were translated into German and French. Bárcena is a member of several European and American scientific associations, and was director of the meteorological observatory of Mexico. He discovered and classified many Mexican plants, and published a book on the natural products of the state of Jalisco, and a treatise on geology. Bárcena represented his nation at the New Orleans exhibition in 1885.

He was elected as a member to the American Philosophical Society in 1877.
