= Tequexquinahuac =

Coordinates: 19°28′N 98°49′W

Tequexquinahuac (commonly Tequex) belongs to the municipality of Tlalnepantla de Baz in the State of Mexico. Tequexquinahuac is a neighborhood of approximately 2,000 inhabitants that is situated in the metropolitan zone of Mexico City, to the north of the borough of Azcapotzalco. Tequexquinahuac has changed from a common town to being an important region between Cuautitlan Izcalli (one of the most important industrialized municipalities in the state of Mexico) and Mexico City.
