= San Bernardo Tlamimilolpan =

Town in Tepetlaoxtoc municipality, State of Mexico, Mexico

Coordinates: 19°33′45″N 98°47′15″W

San Bernardo Tlamimilolpan is a village in located in the municipality of Tepetlaoxtoc in the state of Mexico, Mexico.
