= Los Reyes Acozac =

Coordinates: 19°46′N 98°59′W

Los Reyes Acozac is a community that belongs to the municipality of Tecámac in the State of Mexico in Mexico. It has a population of 20,478 inhabitants and is located at an altitude of 2,250 meters above sea level. The area is known for significant deposits of mammoth bones.
