= Santiago Tequixquiac =

Santiago Tequixquiac Nthehe (in Otomi)
- Municipal Seat
- Interactive map of Santiago Tequixquiac
- Coordinates: 19°54′35″N 99°8′30″W
- Country: Mexico
- State: State of Mexico
- Region: Zumpango Region
- Municipality: Tequixquiac
- Chichimec town: 1168
- Spanish town: 1552
- Municipal town: 1820

Area
  - Total: 10.83 km^{2} (4.18 sq mi)
- Elevation (of seat): 2,100 m (6,900 ft)

Population (2010)
  - Seat: 22,676
- Time zone: UTC-6 (Central (US Central))
- Postal code (of seat): 55650
- Website: http://www.tequixquiac.gob.mx/

Santiago Tequixquiac (or Tequixquiac in Nahuatl and Nthehe in Otomi), is a town and municipal seat from municipality of Tequixquiac in the State of Mexico, in Mexico. As of 2010, the village had a total population of 22,676.

== History ==
The area has been populated for at least the past 12,000 years B.C., according to archeological artifacts found in this area. Humans were most likely drawn here due to the location's abundance of streams and springs; they raised animals and grew fruits and vegetables.

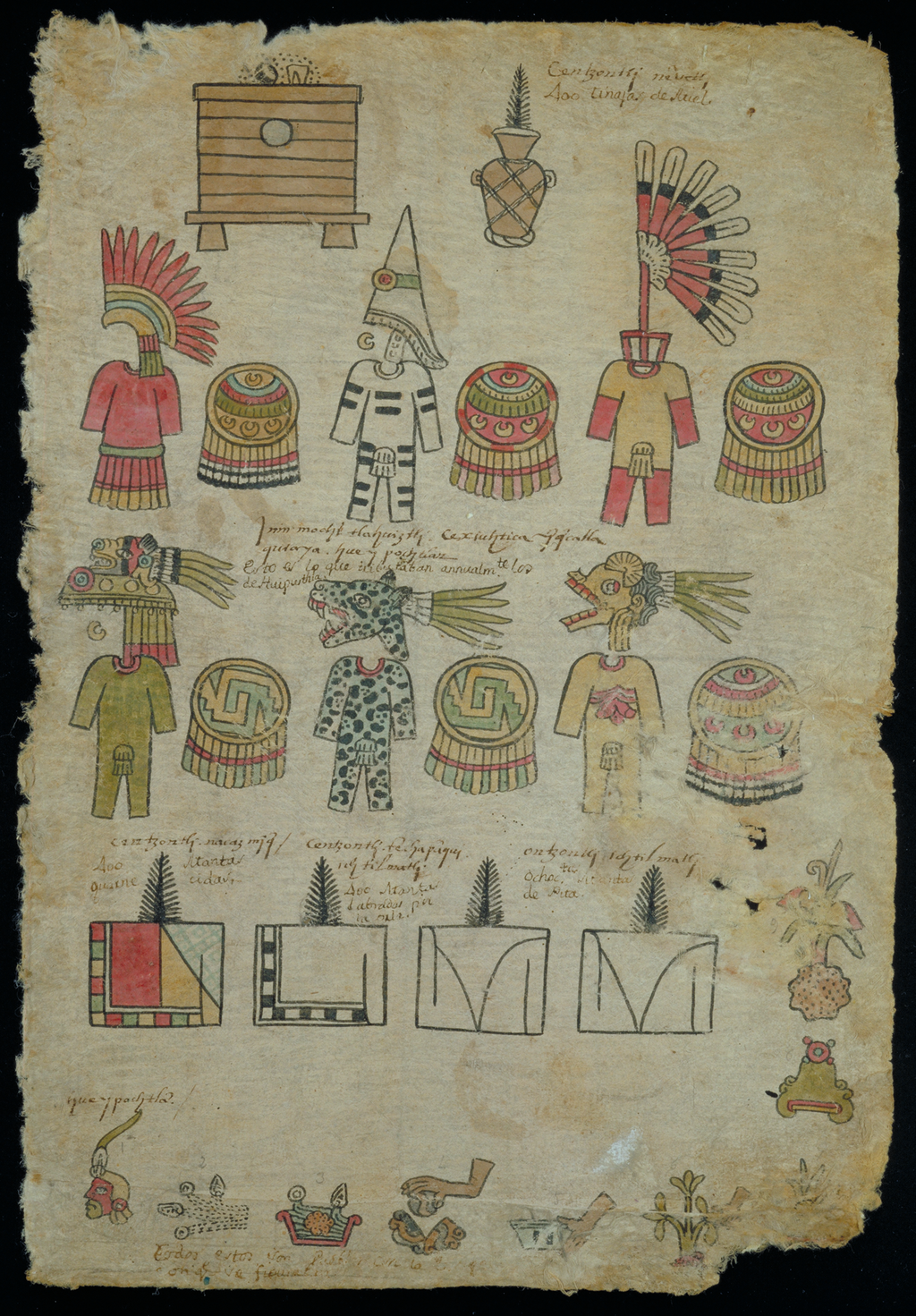
Paying Tribute Codex from Hueypoxtla province.

The foundation of the town is attributed to the Chichimecas, in 1168 A.D. Historical records show that the town was dominated by the Toltecs and the Tepanecas as well as the Aztecs. The Aztecs were the last to take control. This region was named Teotlalpan, after Chimalpopoca conquered the area in 1415. Tequixquiac remained in the Tepaneca district of the Aztec Empire under the authority of the lord of Tacuba, paying tribute to him at Hueypoxtla. The town kept its chiefs, now loyal to the Aztecs, one of the last of which was Acalmiztli, who supposedly was very respected among his subjects. The inhabitants of pre-Conquest Tequixquiac were known for their strict honor code and being advanced in medicine, education, architecture, and civil engineering.

After the fall of the Aztec empire to the Spanish, Hernán Cortés awarded the town and the area around it as an encomiendas to two conquistadors: Martín López, who constructed the brigantines that helped destroy Tenochtitlan and Andrés Núñez. In this town along with Apaxco and Hueypoxtla, lime began to be extracted using Indian forced labor. Indian families were displaced off their lands in 1552 by Francisco López de Tlaltzintlale to make way for more Spanish settlers and new Christians from Spain and Portugal (Crypto-Jews). The viceregal government justified this via religious means. They had the Franciscans build new chapels built on the various encomiendas and settled the Indians around these. One of these chapels was the Temple of Santiago Tequixquiac, which had authority over the new villages of San Mateo Hueycalco, San Sebastián Tlalachco, and others. This temple was constructed in 1569, and became a formal parish in 1590.

=== 19th century and 20th century ===
During a drought, a sculpture of the "Señor de la Capilla" (Our Lord of the Chapel) was brought over to Tequixquiac from Apaxco. When the drought broke, the image was not returned, presumably because it was made of fiber and had grown too heavy to carry. From then on, it has stayed in this town and many miracles have been attributed to it. The parish's vault was constructed in 1856.

The first school in the town was built in 1856 in the San Miguelito neighborhood by Narciso Vargas.

In the 20th century, the production of pulque was economically important here, with the Hacienda of San Sebastián being the major producer. A railway to connect Mexico City with the rest of the country was built through here in 1917 on what is now Alfredo del Mazo street, but was dismantled for political reason in 1945.

=== 21st century and present ===
The town of Santiago Tequixquiac became urbanized as part of the Mexico City Metropolitan Area starting in the 1950s. This urban sector's named agricultural colonies and new colonies at neighborhoods is the answer by Mexican Revolution for the redistribution of agricultural land. These new colonies have been criticized for complicated land propriety and lack of urban planning, security, and municipal services such as water, lighting, cleaning services, and street quality.

Santiago Tequixquiac hasn't united with other towns, has many farms and growing land between other urban areas, but has arrived here more people come from other places. The native people has got vulnerability with an organized crime and narcotrafic cartels with impunity in the municipal government and policy.

== Geography ==
The town of Santiago Tequixquiac, a municipal seat and urban place most populated in the municipality. The town is divided in four barrios (neighborhood.) and one colonia ejidal (Agricultural colony).

The Gran Canal de Desagüe de Ciudad de México is an artificial channel that crossing by Santiago Tequixquiac and connect with natural rivers, at gun port channel (lumbrera La Cinco) is open without tunnel. Other small river is Río Salado de Hueypoxtla this same cross the urban place, is using for irrigation growing lands.

The municipal seat is on a small hill named El Vije (Mbixe), Taxdho hill and Gumisha hill (B'omitsa) to an elongated north valley, the old village was named by Otomi people as (Nthehe) and Aztec people named this site as Tequixquiac (Place on Tequesquite waters).

== Government and administrative divisions ==
As a municipal capital or municipal seat of Tequixquiac, Santiago Tequixquiac is the seat of the municipal government, known as the Ayuntamiento municipal.

=== Neighborhoods ===
Since 1999, the town has been divided into 5 administrative barrios (in Spanish), each neighborhood has got colonies or seccions:

Neighborhood	Colonies
Santiago	Santiago Tequixquiac Downtown
San José	San José Downtown, San Francisco Pueblo Nuevo, Taxdho, El Crucero
San Mateo	San Mateo Downtown, Gumisha, El Vije, Deportiva, El Sol, El Cenicero
San Miguel	San Miguel Downtown, Prados, El Jagüey, La Tres, La Nopalera, La Media Luna
El Refugio	El Refugio Downtown, El Tajo, Palo Grande

The neighborhoods (barrios) are based mostly on historical divisions, and several are former villages annexed by the town seat of Santiago Tequixquiac since Spanish colonial period in New Spain by religious administrative government. Each neighborhood has its own council led by a councilor (presidente del concejo in Spanish), also named COPACI concejo de participación ciudadana or Civil Participative Council. The composition of each neighborhood council depends on the number of votes each political civil parties (planillas in Spanish).

=== Agricultural colonies ===
Since 1999, the city has been divided into 2 administrative Agricultural colonies (colonias ejidales in Spanish), is urban sectors consolidated in the 20th century on communal land by farmer's son homes :

Agricultural colony
Colonia Adolfo López Mateos
Colonia Wenceslao Labra

The Agricultural colonies (colonias ejidales) are based mostly on communal land divisions over neighborhood pad or way, and several are former urban sectors annexed by the town seat of Santiago Tequixquiac since 1960. Each Agricultural colony has its own communal sheriff (comisariado ejidal in Spanish), also the colony people use the COPACI concejo de participación ciudadana or Civil Participative Council. The composition of each colony council depends on the number of votes each political civil parties (planillas in Spanish).

== Demography ==
The people in this village, mainly is Mestizo, mixed between Indigenous people with Iberic people; the first group to occupy this land was Otomis, the second group who stayed here was the Aztecs or Mexicas until the conquest of Mexico Tenochtitlan. The first European people who established this town were Hernán Cortés's soldiers from Spain and Portugal, man who given the encomiendas in Coyoacán, some were Marranos or New Christians (Sephardic settlement converted to Roman Catholic religion).

After Mexico's independence; English miners arrived here from Cornwall, from Pachuca, Necaxa and Real del Monte to build the Grand Channel of Mexico City Waters. Also many people from other states of Mexico arrived as Oaxaca, Veracruz, Puebla and Hidalgo for working. This engineering work was important for Mexico City. In this period many mixed families, grew up the population until the Mexican Revolution when many people died by the war. All through the 20th century the people suffered poverty, hunger and lack of employment, many people emigrated to the north of Mexico and other people to the United States, others settled in Mexico City. In the decade of the 80s, towards the end of 20th century, the population grew up and the quality of life of the inhabitants improved.

In the village of Santiago Tequixquiac there were 22,676 inhabitants in 2010.

== Culture ==
=== Historical monuments ===
- Saint James Apostle Parish is a most important monument in Santiago Tequixquiac town is located at Cuauhtémoc Main Plaza. This temple was constructed in various phases. The atrium was a large space encased in stone with a cross on top of it but with Christian and indigenous symbols mixed on its walls. In each of its four corners there are wells and in the center there is an open space with Solomonic columns. The facade contains two doorways that are elaborately decorated in stonework which contains indigenous symbolism as well. The temple and the town are dedicated to the Apostle James.
- El Calvario Chapel is catholic chapel built by religious activities for indigenous people in 1796.
- Great Channel of Tequixquiac was a construction built in 1937 for to continue the working Water system of Mexico City.
- Municipal House of Tequixquiac, is government house of the Ayuntamiento municipal seat, is located at Cuauhtémoc Main Plaza, into was painted murals that to describe a municipal history, since prehistoric to the 20th century.
- El Mesias Methodist church of Tequixquiac was the first Protestant temple built in Tequixquiac for English mine workers precedents from Real del Monte and Pachuca city, who built the second phase of the desagüe channel of Gran Canal with a British company in 1872. In old Acatlan Hacienda was the first temple inside the working campament, after was built in Tequixquiac Downtown in 1901.
- Casa de los Padres a residence firstly inhabited by a catholic priest, was built in 1930 with a New Spain style. Other owners were a Salinas family and Pérez family.
- Old cemetery Is a monument built in 1920, many death was changed from Saint James Apostle Parish to cemetery, after was made an agricultural defenders commemoration in the army movement into lands of Santiago Tequixquiac ejido (communal lands).
- Great Channel of El Tajo was a construction built in various phases, was inaugurated in 1900 by president Porfirio Díaz as the working Water system of Mexico City.
- Calcium oxide horns and chimney was constructions built for start the caves of Great Channel of Mexico City.

== Notable people ==
- Fortino Hipólito Vera y Talonia (1812-1889), philosopher and writer, bishop of Cuernavaca.
- Jorge Sánchez García (1943), leader, activist and politician, leader of Luz y Fuerza del Centro.

== Bibliography ==
- Bando Municipal de Policía y Buen Gobierno, 2008.
- Monografía Municipal de Tequixquiac, Rodríguez Peláez María Elena, 1999.
- El Refugio un lugar con historia, Rodríguez Reyes, María Jazmín, 2003.
- Santiago Tequixquiac, pueblo metropolitano, Rodríguez Villegas, Manuel, 2014.
