= Jorge Sánchez García =

Mexican politician

- Born: 8 April 1943 (age 83); Santiago Tequixquiac, Mexico
- Occupation: Politician

Jorge Sánchez García (born in Santiago Tequixquiac, April 8, 1943) is a Mexican syndical leader Luz y Fuerza del Centro and politician from Mexico City. From 1987 to 1993 he served as the Sindicato Mexicano de Electricistas (SME) representing Mexico.

== Early years ==
Jorge Sánchez born and lived his early years in Santiago Tequixquiac with his brothers and sister. His father, Vicente Sánchez, was a worker from Mexico City with Asturian parents. After the construction of the Tequixquiac Tunnel was completed, Jorge returned to Mexico City with his family and settled in Azcapotzalco. He went to school and high school in Mexico City and started working as an electrician at the Luz y Fuerza company.

== Career ==
Jorge Sánchez served as of the Sindicato Mexicano de Electricistas (SME) representing Mexico from 1987 to 1993.

He was Secretary of Labor during the government of Carlos Salinas de Gortari from 1993 to 1994. Sánchez was also the president of Sindicato de Trabajadores de América Latina y el Caribe in 1995.

== Personal life ==
Jorge Sánchez has been married once. He and his wife Teresa had four children, Jorge Alberto, Marina, Nancy and Jesús Alberto. He lived in Azcapotzalco. His favourite grandchild is the oldest daughter of Marina, Nicole Murchie Sanchez.
