= Area codes in Mexico by code =

- Country code: 52
- International call prefix: 00
- Trunk Prefix: none

The telecommunication services of Mexico are provided by a telephone numbering plan that specifies groups of area codes for the following regions:

Codes	Area
0–99	Metropolitan areas of Mexico: Guadalajara, Monterrey and Mexico City
200–299	Puebla, Tlaxcala, Oaxaca and Veracruz
300–399	Colima, Jalisco, Michoacán, Nayarit and Zacatecas
400–499	Aguascalientes, Guanajuato, Hidalgo, Jalisco, México, Michoacán, Nuevo León, Querétaro, San Luis Potosí, Tamaulipas, Veracruz and Zacatecas
500–599	México and Hidalgo
600–699	Baja California, Baja California Sur, Chihuahua, Durango, Sinaloa and Sonora
700–799	Guerrero, México, Michoacán, Hidalgo, Morelos, Oaxaca, Puebla, Tlaxcala and Veracruz
800–899	Coahuila, Durango, Nuevo León, San Luis Potosí, Tamaulipas and Veracruz 800 are used for toll free numbers. 801 numbers used to be for premium-rate telephone numbers (such as 1-900 numbers in the United States). Nowadays 900 numbers are premium-rate telephone numbers.
900–999	Campeche, Chiapas, Oaxaca, Puebla, Quintana Roo, Tabasco, Veracruz and Yucatán

== Area codes by federal entity ==
Federal Entity	Area codes
Aguascalientes	449, 458, 465, 495, 496
Baja California	616, 646, 653, 658, 661, 663, 664, 665, 686
Baja California Sur	612, 613, 615, 624
Campeche	913, 938, 981, 982, 983, 996
Chiapas	916, 917, 918, 919, 932, 934, 961, 962, 963, 964, 965, 966, 967, 968, 992, 994
Chihuahua	614, 621, 625, 626, 627, 628, 629, 635, 636, 639, 648, 649, 652, 656, 657, 659
Coahuila	671, 842, 844, 861, 862, 864, 866, 867, 869, 871, 872, 873, 877, 878
Colima	312, 313, 314
Mexico City	55, 56
Durango	618, 629, 649, 671, 674, 675, 676, 677, 871, 872
Guanajuato	352, 411, 412, 413, 415, 417, 418, 419, 421, 428, 429, 432, 438, 442, 445, 456, 461, 462, 464, 466, 468, 469, 472, 473, 476, 477, 479
Guerrero	721, 727, 732, 733, 736, 741, 742, 744, 745, 747, 753, 754, 755, 756, 757, 758, 762, 767, 781
Hidalgo	441, 483, 591, 738, 743, 746, 748, 759, 761, 763, 771, 772, 773, 774, 775, 776, 778, 779, 789, 791
Jalisco	33, 312, 315, 316, 317, 321, 322, 326, 341, 342, 343, 344, 345, 346, 347, 348, 349, 354, 357, 358, 371, 372, 373, 374, 375, 376, 377, 378, 382, 384, 385, 386, 387, 388, 391, 392, 393, 395, 424, 431, 437, 457, 474, 475, 495, 496, 499
México	55, 56, 427, 588, 591, 592, 593, 594, 595, 596, 597, 599, 711, 712, 713, 714, 716, 717, 718, 719, 721, 722, 723, 724, 725, 726, 728, 729, 743, 751, 761, 767
Michoacán	313, 328, 351, 352, 353, 354, 355, 356, 359, 381, 383, 393, 394, 421, 422, 423, 424, 425, 426, 434, 435, 436, 438, 443, 447, 451, 452, 453, 454, 455, 459, 471, 711, 715, 753, 767, 786
Morelos	731, 734, 735, 737, 739, 751, 769, 777
Nayarit	311, 319, 322, 323, 324, 325, 327, 329, 389, 437
Nuevo León	81, 488, 821, 823, 824, 825, 826, 828, 829, 867, 873, 892
Oaxaca	236, 274, 281, 283, 287, 741, 757, 924, 951, 953, 954, 958, 971, 972, 994, 995
Puebla	220, 221, 222, 223, 224, 226, 227, 231, 232, 233, 236, 237, 238, 243, 244, 245, 248, 249, 273, 275, 276, 278, 282, 746, 764, 776, 797, 953
Querétaro	414, 419, 427, 441, 442, 446, 448, 487
Quintana Roo	983, 984, 987, 997, 998
San Luis Potosí	440, 444, 458, 481, 482, 483, 485, 486, 487, 488, 489, 496, 845
Sinaloa	667, 668, 669, 672, 673, 687, 694, 695, 696, 697, 698
Sonora	622, 623, 631, 632, 633, 634, 637, 638, 641, 642, 643, 644, 645, 647, 651, 653, 662
Tabasco	913, 914, 917, 923, 932, 933, 934, 936, 937, 993
Tamaulipas	482, 831, 832, 833, 834, 835, 836, 841, 867, 868, 891, 894, 897, 899
Tlaxcala	222, 223, 241, 246, 247, 248, 276, 748, 749
Veracruz	225, 226, 228, 229, 232, 235, 271, 272, 273, 274, 278, 279, 282, 283, 284, 285, 287, 288, 294, 296, 297, 489, 746, 765, 766, 768, 774, 782, 783, 784, 785, 789, 833, 846, 921, 922, 923, 924
Yucatán	969, 985, 986, 988, 990, 991, 997, 999
Zacatecas	346, 433, 437, 457, 458, 463, 467, 478, 492, 493, 494, 496, 498, 499, 842

== See also ==
- Telephone numbers in Mexico
