= Tequesquite =

Natural mineral salt

Tequesquite or tequexquite (from Nahuatl tequixquitl) is a natural mineral salt containing compounds of sodium chloride, sodium carbonate, and sodium sulphate, used in Mexico since pre-Hispanic times mainly as a food seasoning. It is found naturally in central Mexico particularly in previously lacustrine environments where the mineral salt forms a sedimentary crust.

Sometimes it is confused with potassium nitrate, but its chemical composition is completely different.

== History ==
At the time of the Mexicas, was obtained from Lake Texcoco, especially in the dry season. This lake is salt water, and when the water level of the lake fell or retreated, the water evaporated remained as sediment in some wells tequesquite salt. It is also found as efflorescent natural formation, leaving the soil by capillarity. Another place where salt was abundant was Iztapalapa, which also traded salt. For the Mexicas, salt was a luxury, so the lower classes could not afford it easily.

As of 2020, it can be bought in the markets of some towns in Mexico; It is still an ingredient used in many dishes. However, baking soda and table salt may be used as a substitute, but tradition dictates that the taste of tequesquite cannot be replaced.

== In cooking ==
It is used as a leavening agent by boiling with a solid tequestuite stone and the shells of ten tomatillos in a cup of water and strained.

In the novel Como agua para chocolate (Like Water for Chocolate) by Mexican author Laura Esquivel, tequesquite is used in the dish frijoles gordos con chile a la tezcucano (fat beans with chili Tezcucano style).
