= Fortino Hipólito Vera y Talonia =

Mexican Catholic bishop

Right Reverend Fortino Hipólito Vera
- Bishop of Cuernavaca
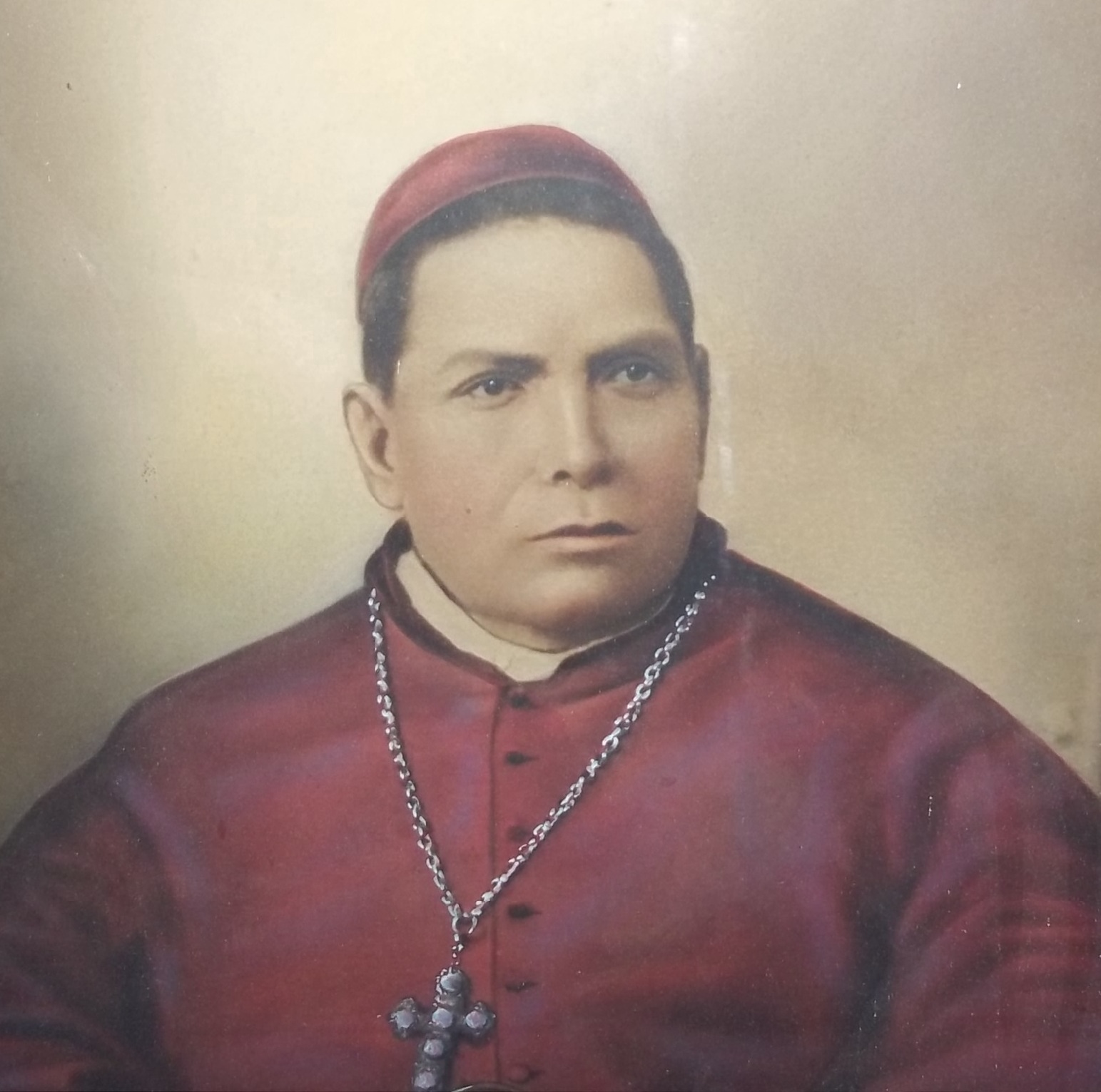
- Church: Catholic Church
- Diocese: Roman Catholic Bishop of Cuernavaca
- See: Roman Catholic Diocese of Cuernavaca
- Elected: July 3, 1894
- Successor: Francisco Plancarte y Navarrete

Orders
- Ordination: December 1857
- Consecration: July 29, 1894 by Archbishop Eulogio Gregorio Clemente Gillow y Zavalza

Personal details
- Born: 1834 Santiago Tequixquiac
- Died: 1898 (aged 63–64) Cuernavaca

Fortino Hipólito Vera (1834–1898) was a Mexican Catholic bishop, born in Santiago Tequixquiac, Mexico. He was the first bishop of Cuernavaca, Mexico. He was a writer and defender of the apparitions of the Virgin of Guadalupe. His collection of related documents is an important source for scholars studying the Guadalupe tradition.

== Publications ==
- Apuntamientos históricos de los concilios provinciales mexicanos y privilegios de América. Estudios previous al Primer Concilio Provincial de Antequera.
- Biografía del Ilmo
- Señor Alcaldo
- Historia del primer concilio de Antequera
- Contestación histórico crítica en defensa de la maravillosa aparición de la Santísima Virgen de Guadalupe, al anónimo intitulado Exquisitio Historica y a otro anónimo también que se dice Libro de Sensación
- Tesoro Guadalupano, Noticia de los Libros, Documentos, Inscripciones, que tratan, mencionan o aluden a la Aparición y Devoción de Nuestra Señora de Guadalupe
- Catecismo geográfico-histórico-estadístico de la iglesia mexicana
- Colección de documentos eclesiásticos de México : o sea Antigua y moderna legislación de la Iglesia mexicana
- Escritores eclesiásticos de México, o bibliografía histórica eclesiástica mexicana
- Informaciones sobre la milagrosa aparición de la Santísima Virgen de Guadalupe, recibidas en 1666 y 1723
- Itinerario parroquial del Arzobispado de México y reseña histórica, geográfica y estadística de las Parroquias del mismo Arzobispado
