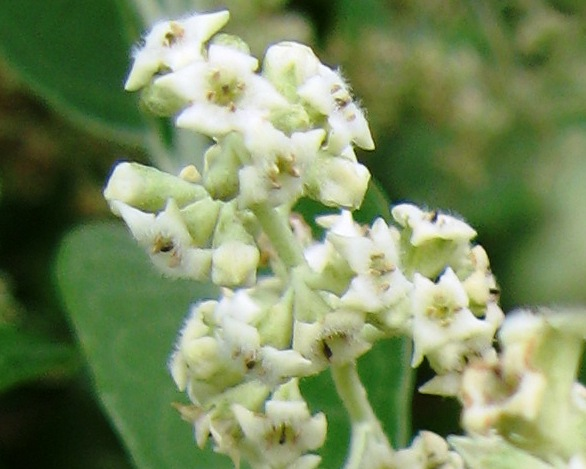
- Buddleja cordata flowers

Scientific classification
- Kingdom: Plantae
- Clade: Embryophytes
- Clade: Tracheophytes
- Clade: Spermatophytes
- Clade: Angiosperms
- Clade: Eudicots
- Clade: Asterids
- Order: Lamiales
- Family: Scrophulariaceae
- Genus: Buddleja
- Species: B. cordata

Binomial name
- Buddleja cordata Kunth

Synonyms
- Buddleja acuminata Kunth; Buddleja astralis Standl. & Steyerm.; Buddleja cordata Kunth var. teposan Loes.; Buddleja decurrens Schltdl. & Cham.; Buddleja floccosa Kunth; Buddleja floccosa Kunth var. crassifolia Loes.; Buddleja humboldtiana Willd. ex Schultes & Schultes; Buddleja macrophylla Kunth; Buddleja ovalifolia Kunth; Buddleja propinqua Kunth; Buddleja spectabilis Kunth & Bouché

= Buddleja cordata =

Species of flowering plant

Buddleja cordata is endemic to Mexico, growing along forest edges and water courses at elevations of 1500–3000 m; it has also naturalized in parts of Ethiopia. The species was first described and named by Kunth in 1818.

== Description ==
Buddleja cordata is a large deciduous dioecious shrub or tree < 20 m tall in the wild. The trunk, which can reach 45 cm in diameter, has a furrowed bark, brownish or blackish in colour. The ovate to narrowly elliptical leaves are opposite and paired, 4–23 cm long by 3–14 cm wide, on petioles 1–4 cm long. The terminal inflorescences are paniculate, 6–30 cm long with at least two orders of branches, the lowermost subtended by leaves, the uppermost by small bracts. The small fragrant flowers are grouped into shortly pedunculate cymules, the corollas white, cream, or yellow, with a flush of orange at the throat, 1.5–2.5 long. Ploidy: 2n = 76 (tetraploid).

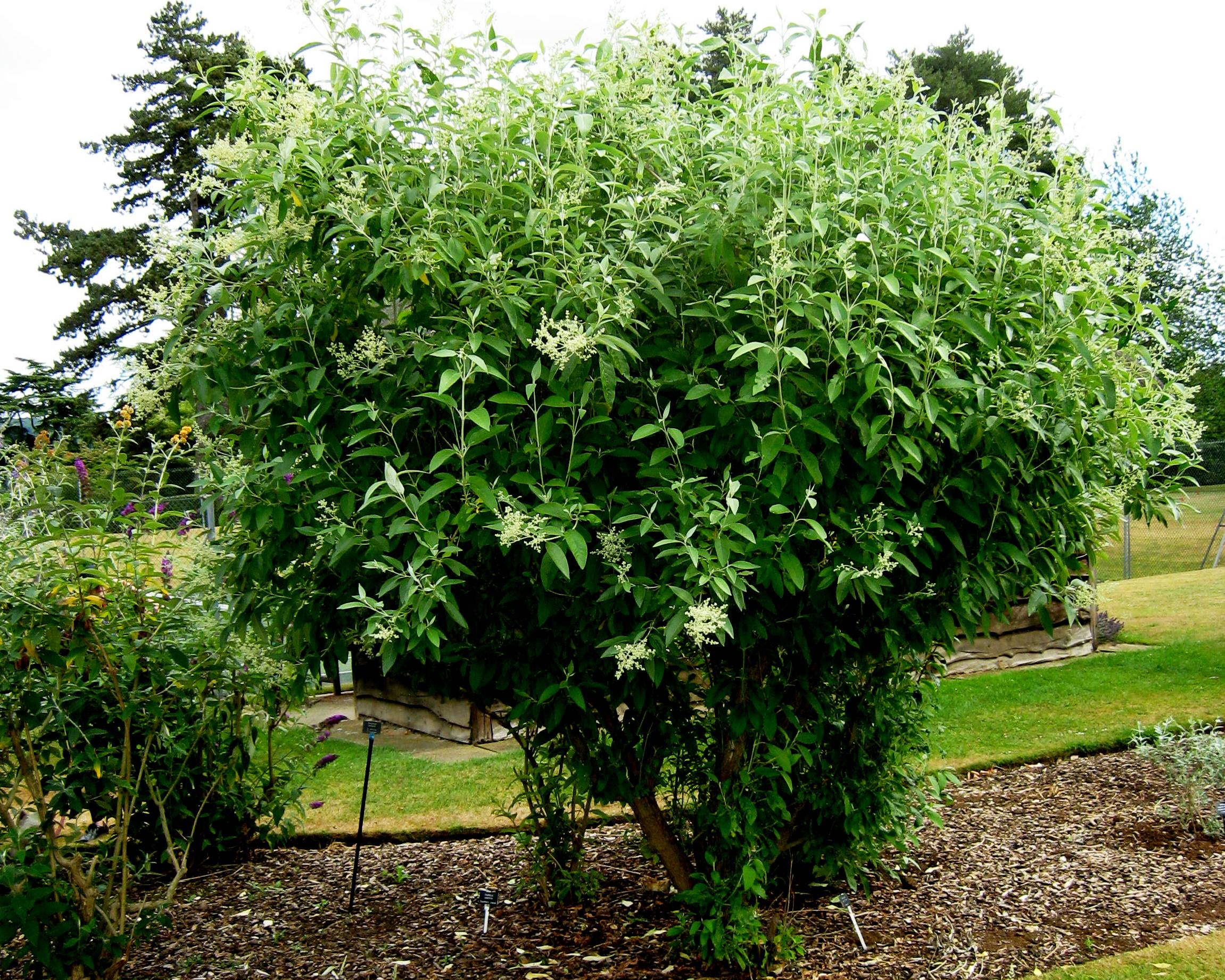
10-year-old B. Cordata

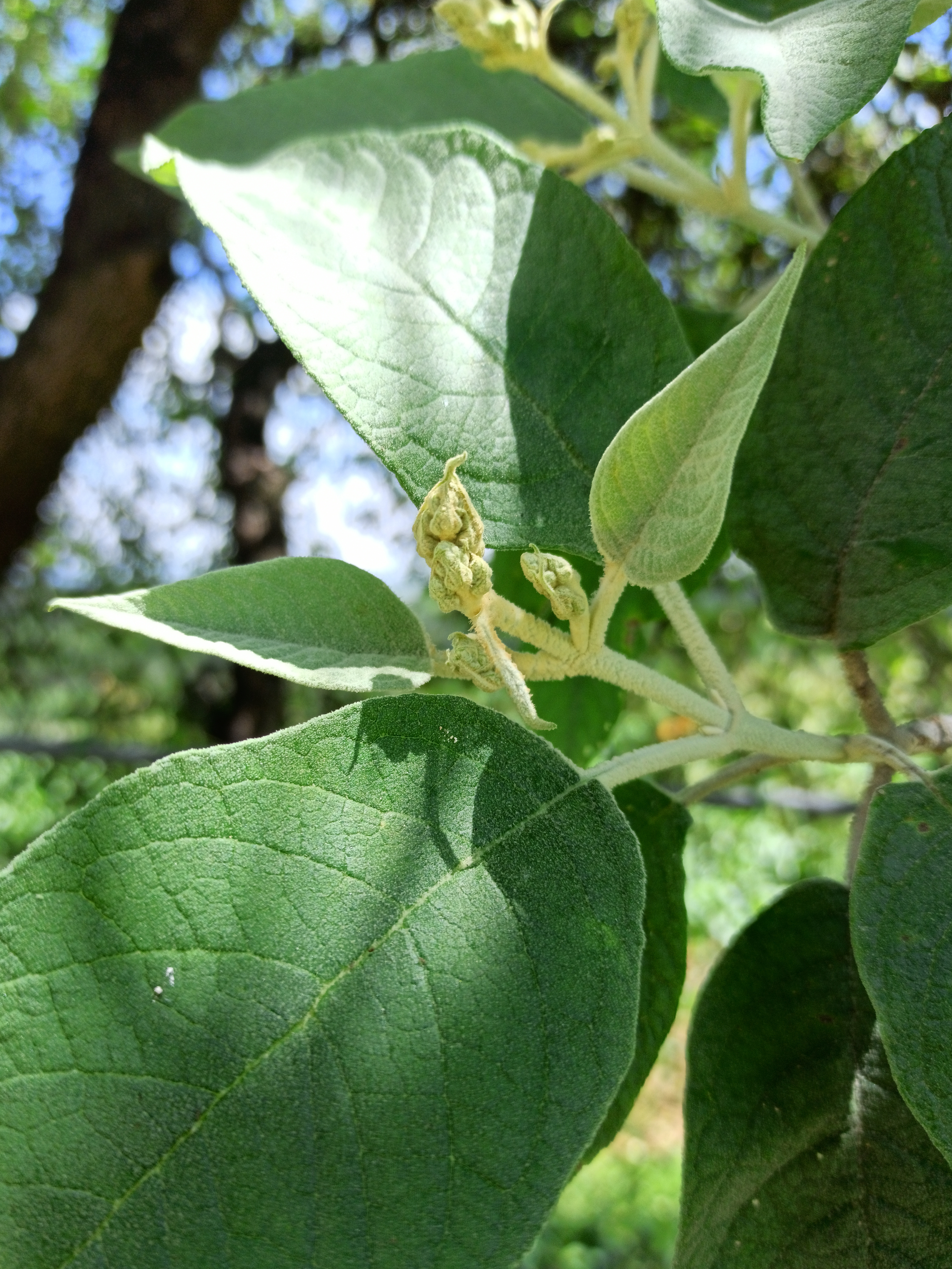
B. cordata leaves

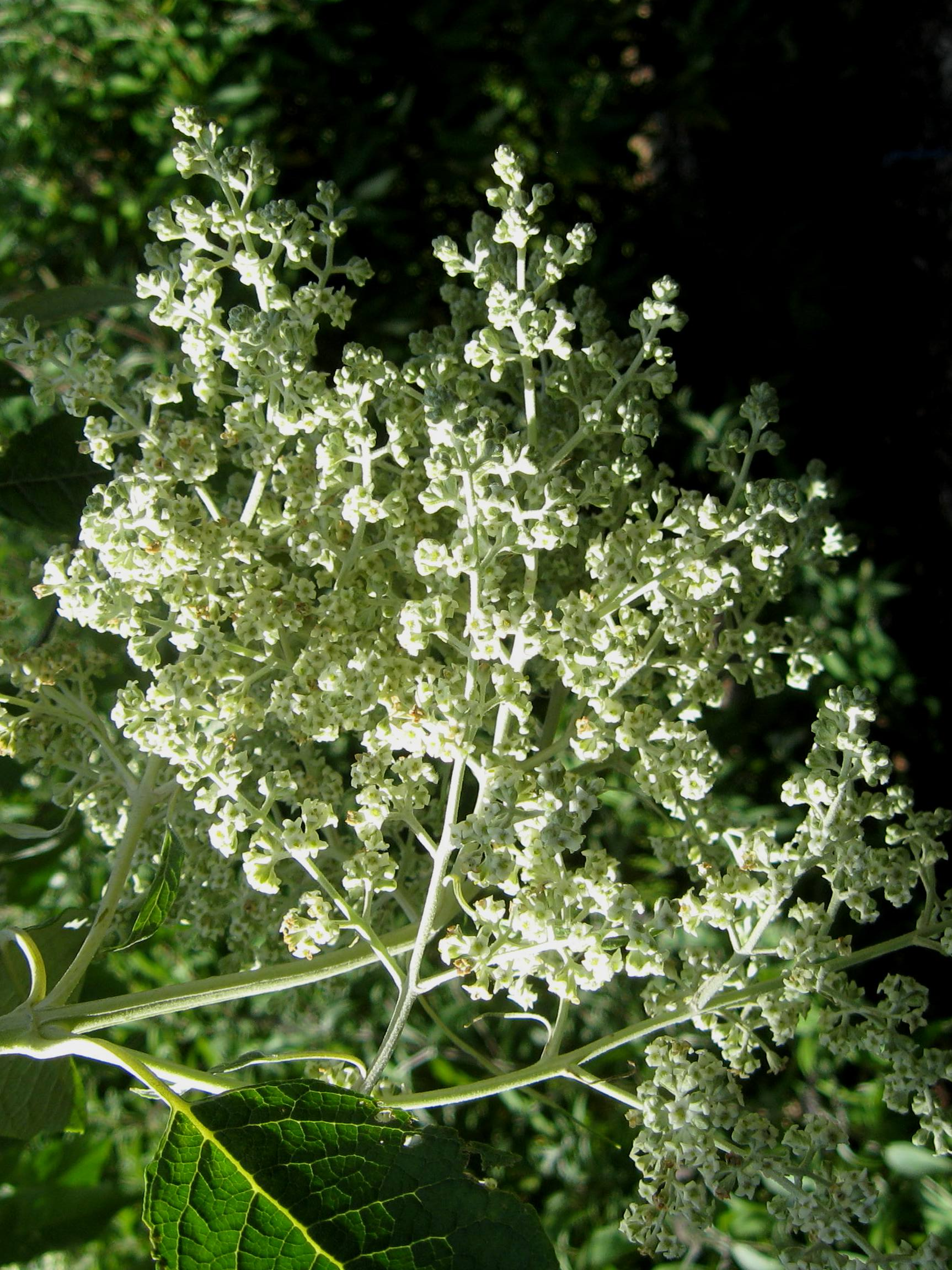
B. cordata panicle

== Cultivation ==
The species is cold hardy in the UK. A large specimen grows in the Centenary Border of the Sir Harold Hillier Gardens in Hampshire, another as part of the NCCPG national collection at Longstock Park Nursery, also in Hampshire. Hardiness: USDA zone 8.

== Uses ==
The species (and the genus as a whole) contain secondary metabolites such as flavonoids and iridoid glycosides which have shown much promise in the treatment of cancers and a wide range of other disorders.
