= Apaxco =

- Municipality and town
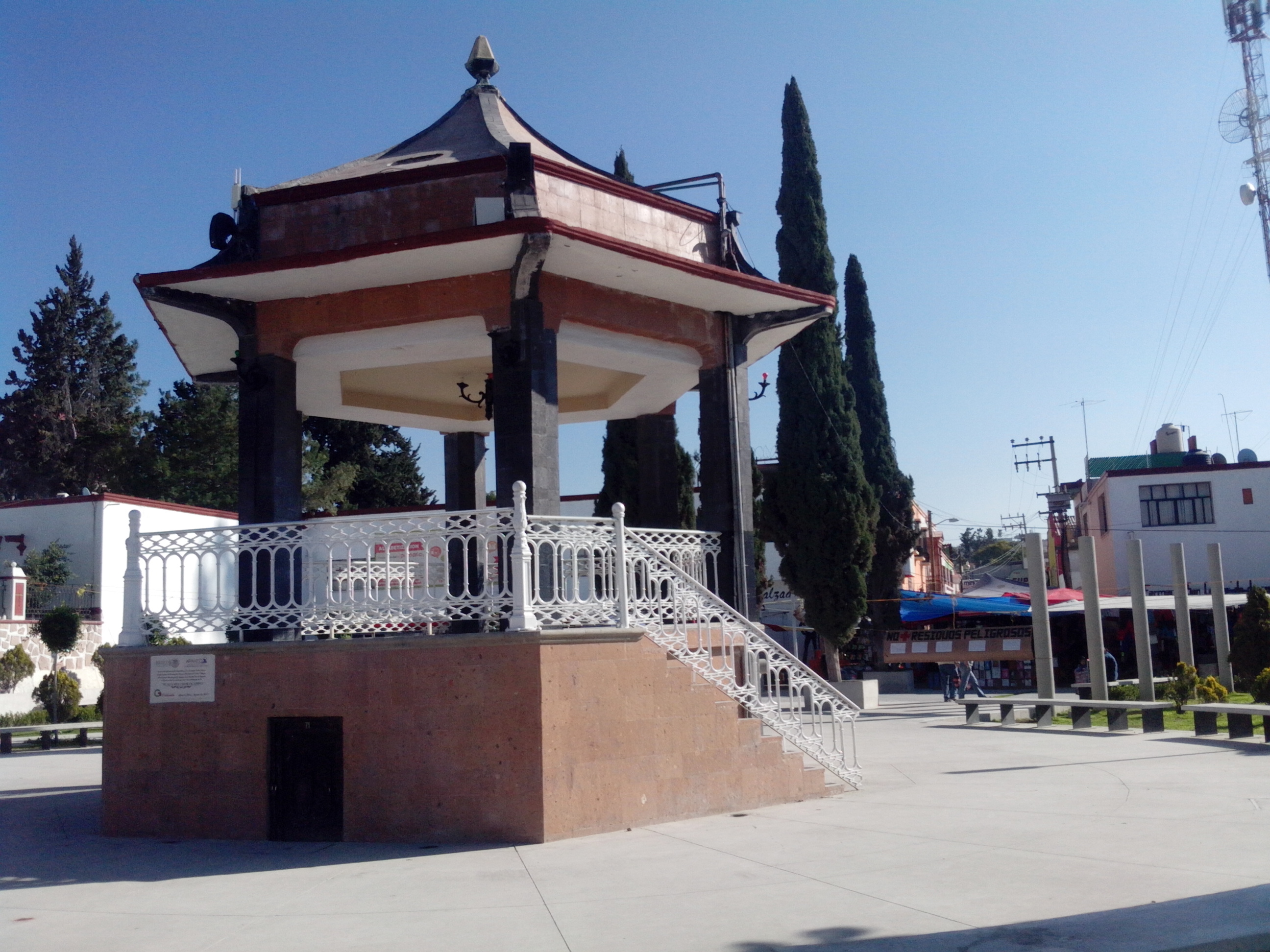

- Coordinates: 19°59′N 99°09′W
- Country: Mexico
- State: Mexico (state)
- Founded: October 16, 1870

Area
  - Total: 80.34 km^{2} (31.02 sq mi)
- Elevation: 2,213 m (7,260 ft)

Population (2010)
  - Total: 27,521
  - Density: 342.6/km^{2} (887.2/sq mi)
- Time zone: UTC-6 (Central Standard Time)
- Website: www.apaxco.gob.mx

Apaxco (Otomi: Pixkuai) is a municipality located in the Zumpango Region of Mexico. The municipal territory is located at a southern pass leading out of the Mezquital Valley about 288 km (179 mi) northeast of the state capital of Toluca. The name Apaxco comes from Nahuatl (meaning "place of the waterfall").

The municipality, founded on October 16, 1870, covers an area of 80.34 square kilometres (31.02 sq mi). Apaxco de Ocampo is the municipal seat, and a border city with Vito and El Refugio (between the State of Mexico and the State of Hidalgo; inside of Cuenca cementera). It is an important area for the building industry, although it has ecological problems.

== Geography ==
The town of Apaxco de Ocampo the seat of the municipality, with jurisdiction over the following communities: Coyotillos, Santa María, Loma Bonita, Pérez de Galeana and Colonia Juárez. The total municipality extends 84.37 km^{2} and borders with the municipalities of Tequixquiac and Hueypoxtla, and with Atotonilco de Tula and Ajacuba (in the State of Hidalgo).

The Gran Canal de Desagüe is an artificial channel that crosses Apaxco, and was named Xothé river in the Otomi language. This channel connects with the Tula River and the Endhó dam. Other small rivers are Treviño, Zarco, El Codo and Teña, which connect with the Gran Canal. Apaxco has thermal waters, and subterranean rivers with hot springs, called Los Bañitos.

The municipal seat is in a small, elongated valley, but most of the municipality is on a high mesa which transitions from the Valley of Mexico to the Mezquital Valley. The highest mountains in Apaxco are the Cerro El Estudiante, Cerro Teña, Cerro Coyotillos, Cerro Blanco and Cerro Pelón in Tezontlalpan Sierra. Other mountains are Cerro Mesa Ahumada (or Cerro Colorado) in the border between the municipalities of Huehuetoca and Tequixquiac. In the center of Apaxco de Ocampo is a low relief known as El Hoyo (the hole), which according to popular belief is the crater of a meteorite; the Aztec people called the depression apatztli in the Nahuatl language.

Apaxco municipality is a rural territory of the Central Mexican Plateau, in the south of the Mezquital Valley, and has a semi-desert climate.

=== Flora and fauna ===
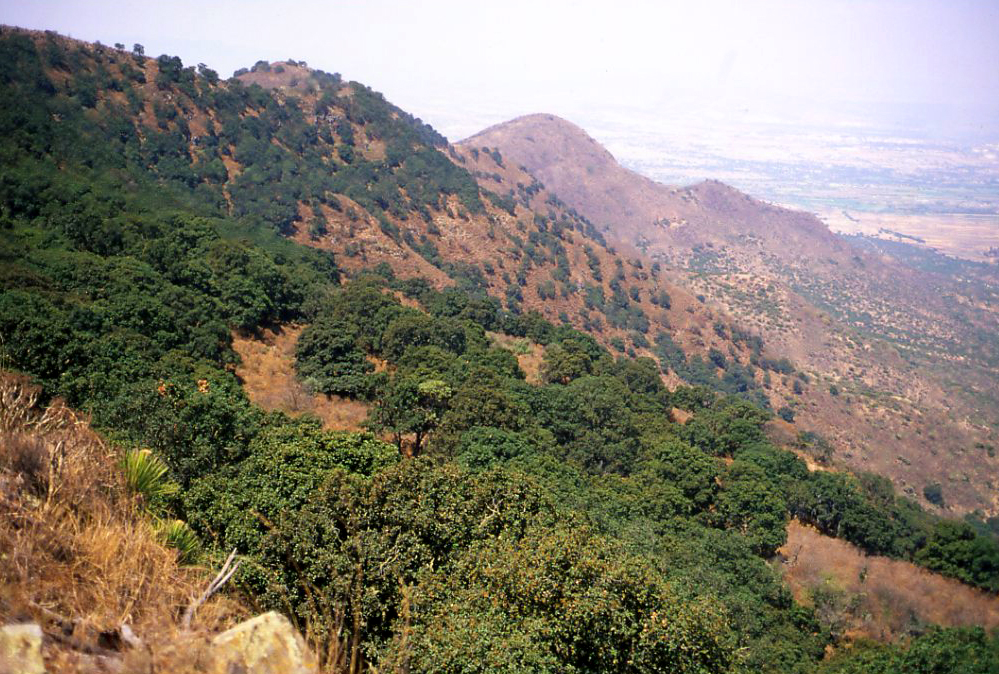
The Sierra de Tezontlalpan form a natural border between State of Mexico and State of Hidalgo.

Since the area is mainly semi-desert land with calcium stones, the plants consist of cacti and trees with low water needs. Apaxco has chollas, prickly pears, mesquites, huizaches, golden barrels, creosote bush, and century plants. In the high Sierra de Tetzontlalpan, there are oaks, piñon pines and cedars. In Cerro Mesa Ahumada there are other species such as ferns, tejocote trees, white zapote trees, kidneywood trees, tepozans, and visnagas.

Apaxco has many native animals. Birds include the owl, eagle, falcon, turkey, colibri, turkey vulture, northern mockingbird, rufous-crowned sparrow, lesser roadrunner, and roadrunner. The reptiles and amphibians include rattlesnakes, pine snakes, xincoyotes, axolotls, frogs, and toads. The insects include red ants and bees. Apaxco has two mountain ranges, where there is a diversity in mammals. To the south is Cerro Mesa Ahumada with cacomistle, skunk, gopher, Virginia opossum, rabbit, and Mexican gray squirrel and to the north the Sierra de Tetzontlalpan is home to bobcat, coyote, and hare.

This region was once inhabited by megafauna such as Cuvieronius, mammoth, glyptodonts and others.

== History ==
The first settlers in the region date to 5000 BC, evidenced by stone carvings around the mountains. These were Otomian group ancestors. The civilizations that followed had a direct relationship with the Teotihuacan civilization, until they declined between 650 and 900 AD. They were afterwards dominated by the Toltecs.

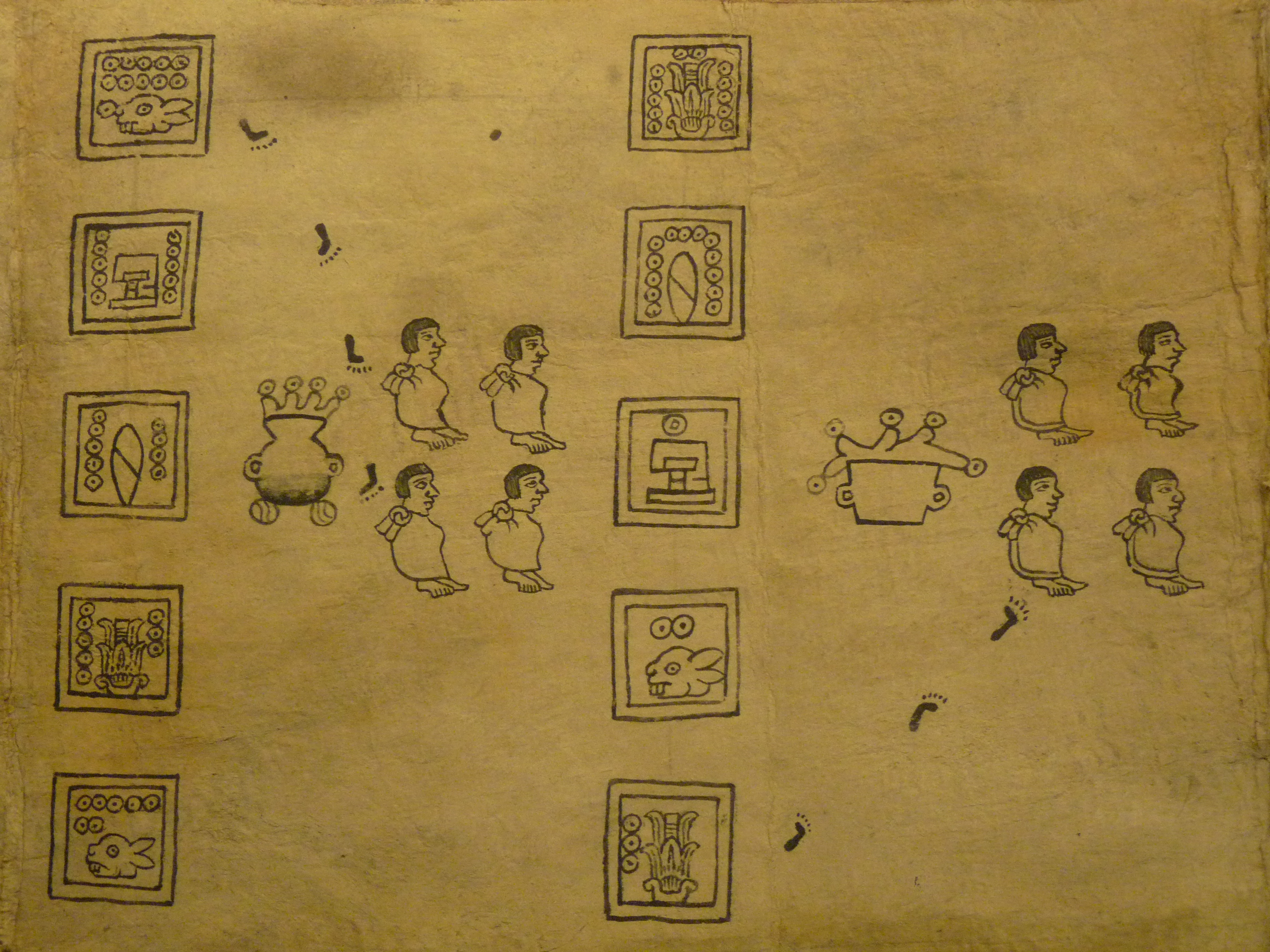
Page XI, Codex Boturini

The most important source about Apaxco in pre-Columbian history is the Codex Boturini, which shows on page XI Atotonilco and Apaxco during the pilgrimage to the mythical promised city of the Aztecs. Apaxco was the place where they celebrated the second new fire before continuing their way south, towards Ecatepec, ending their long pilgrimage on the banks of the hill of Chapultepec.

With the rise of the Aztec Empire, Apaxco and the neighboring region came under the government of Tlacopan, one of the members of the Triple Alliance. Tenochcas subjugated the Otomi people and founded the Teotlalpan, a desert region with abundant mountains. Apaxco, Tula and Ajoloapan were places rich in lime which was a very coveted mineral for building, and was used as a tax payment to the Aztec empire.

Apaxco remained in this position until the fall of Tenochtitlan before the army of Hernán Cortés. In colonial times, Apaxco entered the system of encomienda imposed by the Spanish conquerors, and came under the command of Cristóbal Hernandez Mosquera in 1530.

Apaxco was erected as a township in 1870, after the end of the French intervention. The first school was founded in 1880. During the Porfirio Díaz government, the municipality entered into an economic depression and the township could not maintain its economic administration; from 1899 until 1923, Apaxco was a part of Texquiquiac municipality.

Apaxco became one of the first industrial municipalities in the State of Mexico. In 1900, engineer Luis Espinosa built a calcium oxide factory in Apaxco. This factory was named in 1911 as Calera de Apasco Company (Apaxco lime company). A cement factory was built in 1934, but production difficulties led to exploitation of the workers. In 1964, this cement factory was sold to Swiss company Holderbank (now Holcim).

From 1923, the inhabitants of Apaxco initiated a legal movement to restore control of lands taken from them. In 1927, the legal suit succeeded in returning several hectares benefiting eight hundred people, also granting them water rights for agricultural needs.

== Communication and transport ==
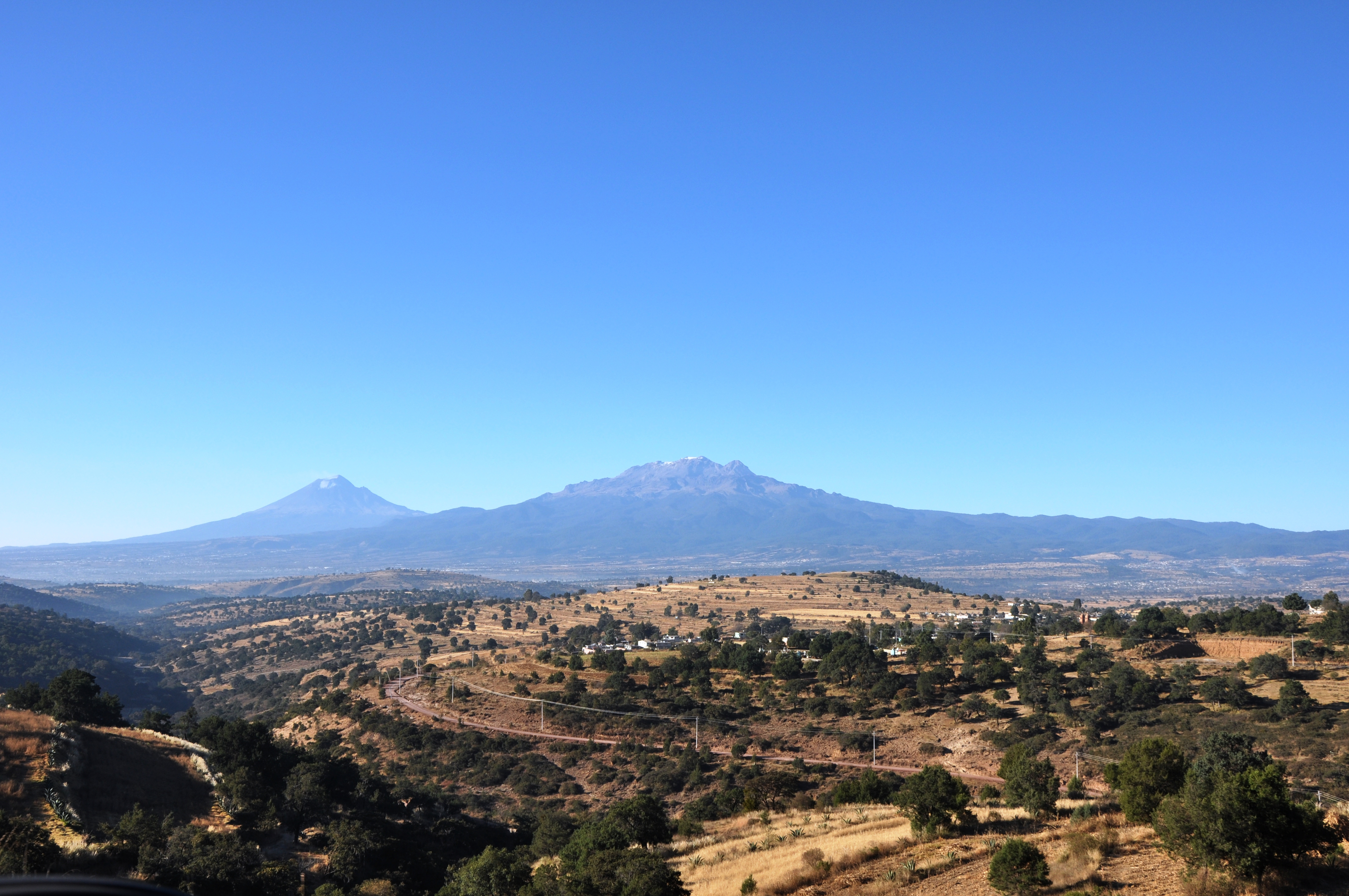
View from the Arco Norte highway

The Arco Norte (Northern Arc) is a principal highway that crosses the northeast part of Apaxco. This municipality has three state roads: Zumpango–Apaxco number 9 which connects Mexico City to Atitalaquia, State of Hidalgo. The west road, Huehuetoca–Apaxco number 6 cross Santa María, junctions to Conejos in Atotonilco de Tula, with connection to the Tula–Jorobas highway. The other municipal road connects with Pérez de Galeana and Coyotillos.

The railroad is on the Mexico City–Nuevo Laredo line, connecting to the US border.

== Demography ==
Town	Population
Apaxco de Ocampo	13,836
Santa María Apaxco	3,747
Coyotillos	3,084
Pérez de Galeana	1,844
Total	27,521

At the census of 2010, there were 27,521 people, The population density was 343/km^{2} (890/sq mi). The median age was twenty-four years.

=== Religion ===
Catholicism represents 98% of the total population of the municipality, 15,796 persons in 1990. The parish main church is the San Francisco de Asís Parish and it belongs to the Diocese of Cuautitlán.

Religion	Population (1990)
Roman Catholic	15,796
Protestantism	287
Atheism	114
Others	208
No specific	47
Total	16,099

=== Health ===
There is a regional IMSS ('Mexican Social Security Institute') hospital. This municipality has three public health clinics: Instituto de Salud del Estado de México (ISEM) in Apaxco de Ocampo, Santa María Apaxco, and Coyotillos town. The principal causes of death are respiratory problems caused by cancer and pneumonia.

== Politics ==
Mayor	Time
Guadalupe Hernández Méndez	2003–2006
Daniel Parra Ángeles	2006–2009
Ignacio Cruz García	2009–2012
Daniel Parra Ángeles	2012–2015
Jesús Cruz Parra	2016–

== Culture ==
The Archeological Museum of Apaxco is an important site at the main plaza where there are many archeological pieces from Toltec, Aztec and Teotihuacan cultures.

Saint Francis parish is a monument within Apaxco de Ocampo. This temple was constructed in various phases, begun by Franciscan priests. The atrium is a large space encased in stone, topped by a cross with Christian and indigenous symbols. Inside is a boveda (arched ceiling) with a chorus to the baroque altar. The facade contains two doorways that are elaborately decorated in stonework containing indigenous symbolism. The temple is dedicated to the Saint Francis of Assisi. During the first week of October, las Fiestas Franciscanas is held, with a procession through the main streets, music, games, and pyrotechnics.

La Misión chapel is a monument in Apaxco de Ocampo. This chapel, constructed in the Spanish period, is a small Catholic church occupied by religious priests for the purpose of evangelizing the indigenous people.

Railroad station Apaxco is a building that was constructed in the 19th century to connect Tula railway to Querétaro City.

On September 16 and November 20, the schoolchildren parade through the streets in school and sport uniforms, along with various public servants.

The Franciscan Cultural Festival is an annual artists exhibition taking place on October 4.

== Sports and Entertainment ==
The first modern sport practiced in Apaxco was football. When cement factory workers arrived, racquetball began to be practiced. Racquetball can be played at the Deportivo Apaxco complex in Loma Bonita, south of town.

The hills of Apaxco were used to pasture cows and sheep; the Spanish had very large haciendas and employed indigenous people as vaqueros or herdsman, who became excellent horsemen. This heritage is recognized in practicing the charrería, a nine-event competition.

== See also ==
- Teotlalpan
- Cerro Mesa Ahumada
