= Hueypoxtla =

- town
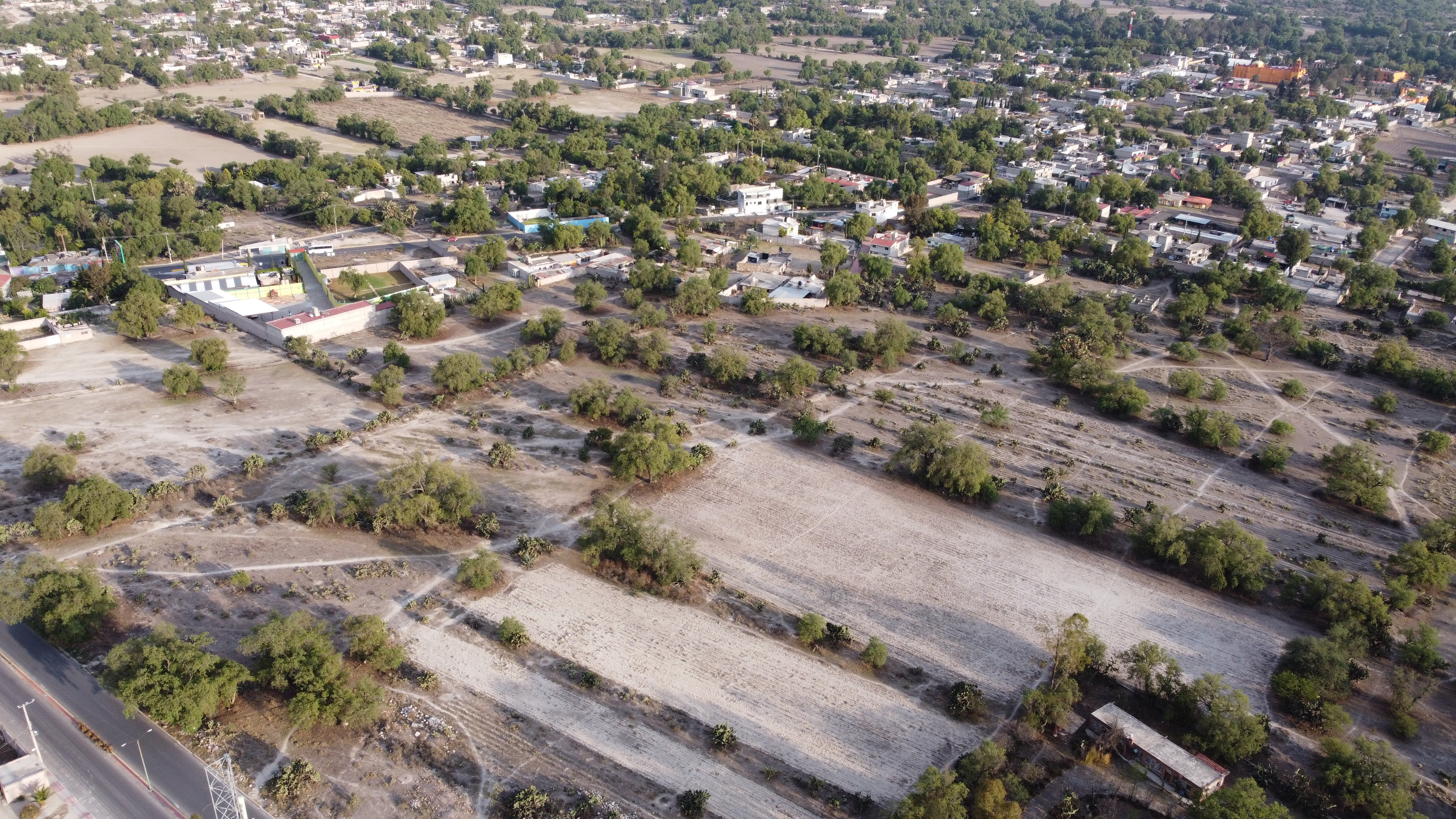
- Aerial view of a baseball field

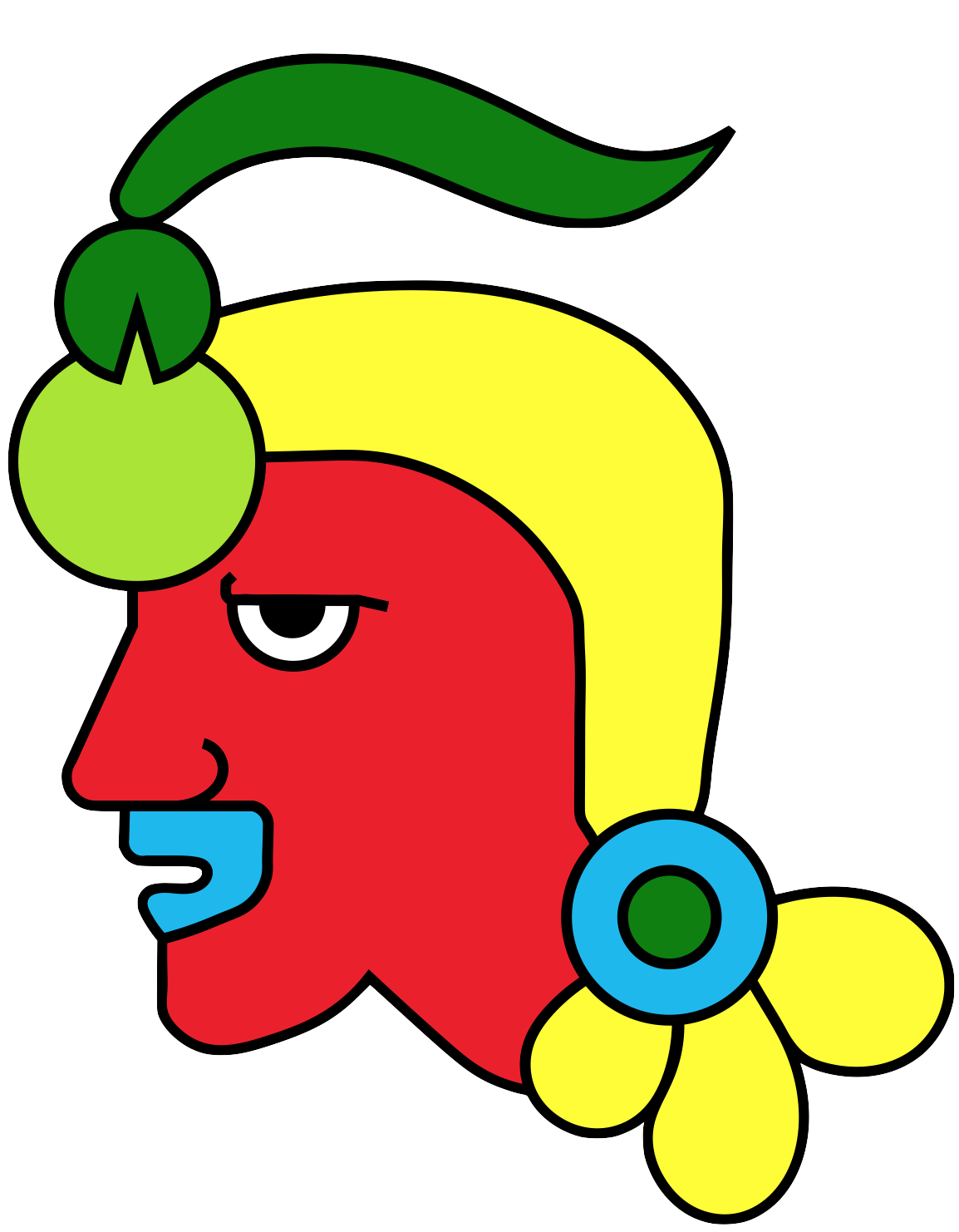
- Coat of arms

- Location within State of Mexico Location within Mexico
- Coordinates: 19°54′N 99°05′W
- Country: Mexico
- State: State of Mexico

Area
  - Total: 80.34 km^{2} (31.02 sq mi)

Population (2010)
  - Total: 3,989
- Time zone: UTC-6 (Central Standard Time)
- Website: https://www.hueypoxtla.gob.mx/

Hueypoxtla or Villa de San Bartolomé Hueypoxtla is a town in the State of Mexico, in Mexico. It serves as the municipal seat of the surrounding municipality of the same name. In 2010, the town had a total population of 3,989. The name comes from the Nahuatl language and means "place of great merchants" (see pochteca).

== Hueypoxtla radiological incident ==
On December 4, 2013, a cobalt-60 radioactive source stolen from a truck two days earlier in Tizayuca, Hidalgo, was recovered there, as well as the heavy truck itself; the decommissioned cobalt therapy machine had been en route from Tijuana, Baja California, to proper disposal at a radioactive waste storage centre in the nearby municipality of Temascalapa. Federal police and military units established an armed cordon approximately 500 metres (1,600 ft) around the exposed radiation source in the empty lot where it had been removed from its protective shielding and abandoned. Classes were suspended for two days at a neighbourhood kindergarten named for Marie Curie. Six people showing signs of possible radiation exposure from the orphan source were later detained. The source's level of radioactivity was reported as 3000 curies (111 terabequerels). It is not known whether the thieves wanted the truck (which included a crane), the cobalt-60, or both.
