= Teotlalpan =

Teotlalpan (Nahuatl: teōtlālpan or teuhtlālpan) was the pre-Columbian name of a region in the north of Valley of Mexico comprising what is today the Mezquital Valley in the state of Hidalgo and adjacent areas in the State of Mexico. The region was one of two regions settled by Otomí people, the other being the region around Jilotepec and Tula, Hidalgo. In the 18th century the name of the main part of the region came to be known as Mezquital.

== History ==
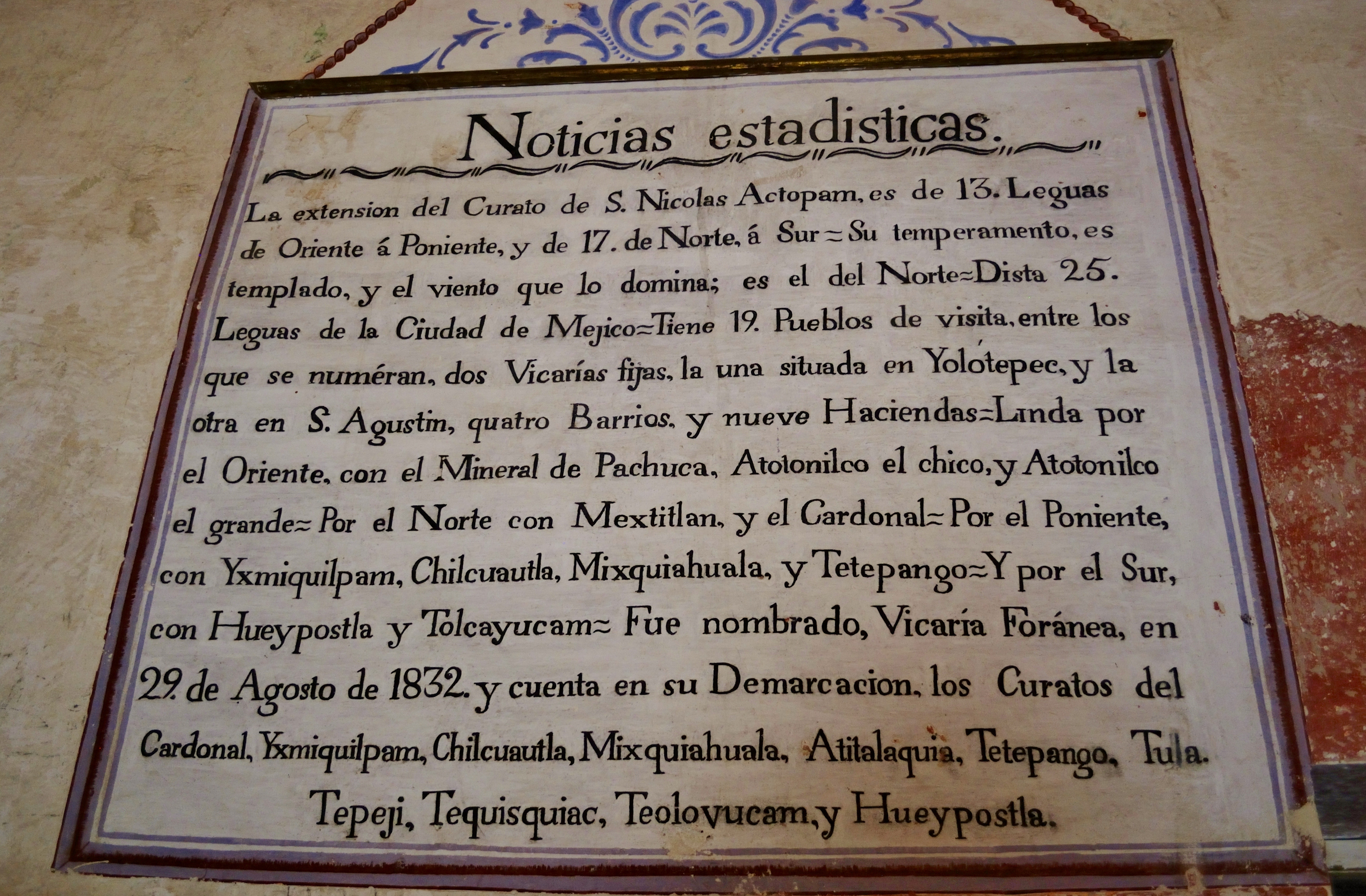
Inscription inside of San Nicolás Tolentino monastery, about the curatos (parishes).

After the fall of Tula Xicocotitlan, a large desert region was populated by the Otomi people and Nahua people, in this way making a new kingdom (1220-1395) from Tecpanecapan. They were later defeated by the tepanecs from Azcapotzalco. With the collapse of Xaltocan (old city-state inside Lake of Texcoco), the Otomies in 1395, escaped to the north by the attacks. Otomi people from Xaltocan occupied other lands as Teotlalpan, a land after the Lake Zumpango.

The annals actually show that the Mexicas had little interest in the area, in times of tepaneca dominion when Chimalpopoca ruled, was conquered Tequixquiac (1413) and its surroundings, later during the expansion of tenochca dominion, Moteuczoma Ilhuicamina submits Axocopan, Atotonilco and Xilotepec, however the consolidation of northern occurred until 1488 in the days of Ahuitzotl by the need for greater supply of materials for the great metropolis of Tenochtitlan.

The viceregal government justified this by religious orders means in Teotlalpan region, Franciscans and Augustinians was a evangelizers of indigenous people of The Teotlalpan; this land was very necessary the easy evangelization for the religious conquest from Huaxtec Region. This lands was scorned by tenochcas, with the delivery of encomiendas, the region was destined to be populated by Spaniards and to maintain a cattle activities.

== Geography ==
This territory was known by Chichimeca-Nahuas as strange land, dangerous and arid planes or deserts, was administrated by Kingdom of Acolhuacan. The fields are irrigated along the Tula River, the edges of the rivers were used for irrigation and husbandry, the region is characterized by green river valleys and very dry hills.

Mountains partially bracket the area with Sierra de Tepotzotlán, Cerro Mesa Ahumada and Sierra de Tetzontlalpan to the south which have small oak forests, in the middle are the Cerro del Xicohco, to the east lies the Pachuca Range, at the northern end are the Sierra Juárez in Ixmiquilpan, and to the west lie the Sierra de Tecozautla.

It was never well defined the northern region of Valley of Mexico, but included the provinces of Hueypoxtla and Axacopan. It is said to begin at the end of Otompan, the altepeme as Huehuetoca, Coyotepec, Zitlaltepec, Itzcuincuitlapillan, Hueypoxtla, Tzompanco, Xilotzinco, Tequixquiac, Tetlapanaloya, Apazco, Ajoloapan, Zacacalco, Tetzontlalpan, Tolcayohcan, Tizayohcan, Tetzontepec, Cempoalan, Pachuca, Coscotitlan, Nopalapa, Nopancalco, Epazoyohcan and spread across arid valley now known as Mezquital Valley to places as Tepexi, Chantepec, Atotonilco, Tlachcoapan, Atitalaquia, Tetepanco, Tolnacuxtla, Tecama, Chilcuautla, Tepatepec, Mizquiahuala, Ixmiquilpan, Zimapan, Nopala, Tecozautla, Actopan, Chapantongo and all region bordering the mythical city of Tula.

== Subsequent Uses ==
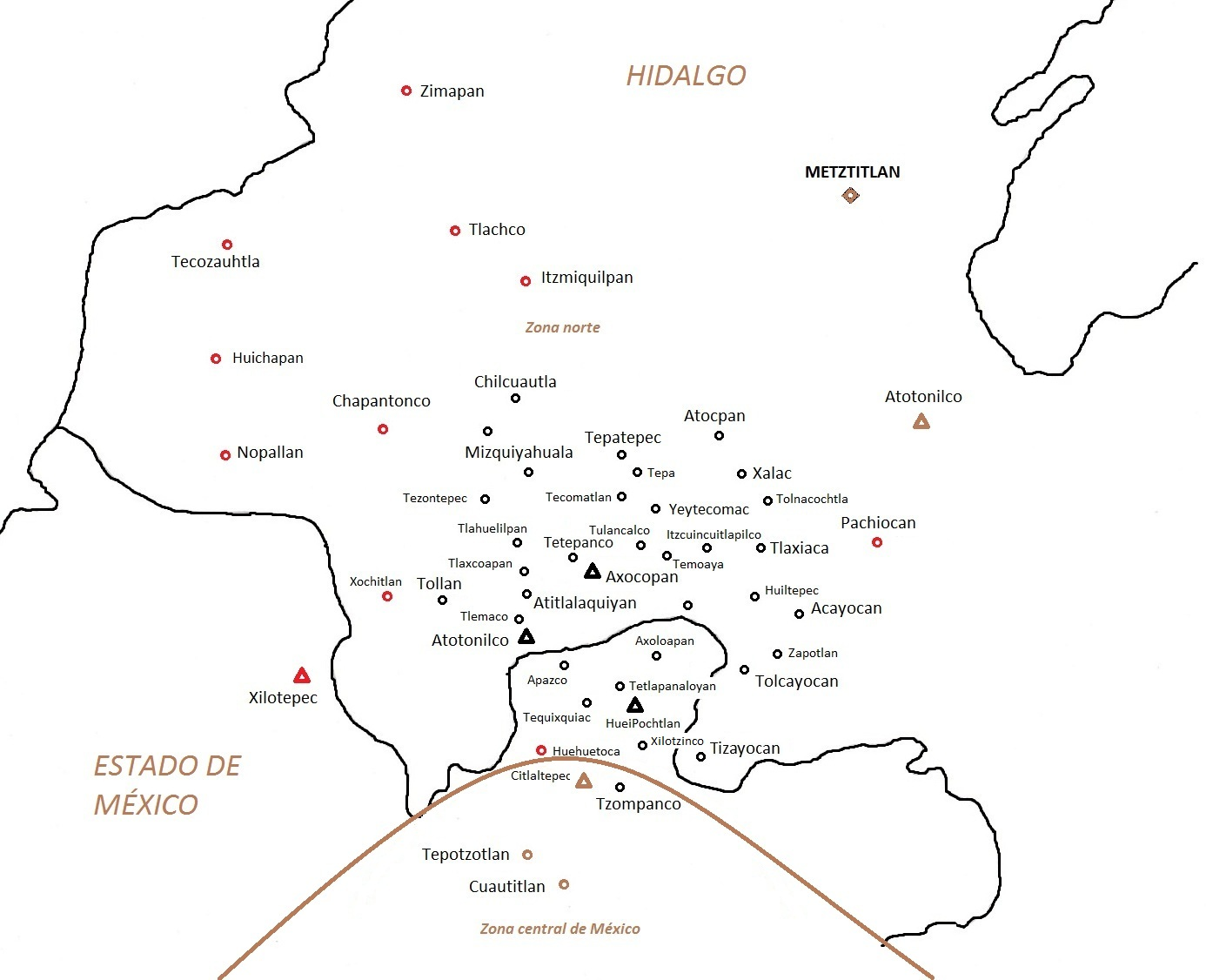
Main towns in the north of the Valley of Mexico in pre-Hispanic times. With triangles, the headers of the tributary provinces are represented, with circles the dependents; Metztitlán (with rhombus) was an independent state (tlahtohcayotl) of the Excan Tlahtoloyan.

When the viceregal authorities within its changing and varied choice to name the Mexican territory (encomienda, mayorazgo, alcaldía mayor, corregimiento, capitanía, Etc.) are commissioned by the Spanish crown to develop a description of the territory, first from the clerical order with Archbishop Alonso de Montufar in 1570, who compiled from his friars the "Descripción del Arzobizpado de México" (see references below), then under the ordinance of King Philip II to develop the "Geographic relations" (Relaciones Geográficas) 1579 (some written in 1580 and 1582, the last until 1583), in both documents resorted to create the notion of "comarcas" (Term of use not clear during the 16th century) to designate small jurisdictions that showed some relationship (no historical support, rather was a criterion of neighborhood or proximity). Thus, in the absence of a better term, they used by simple logic the word Teotlalpan to demarcate indigenous towns inside north of the Valley of Mexico that showed more insulation populations and a drier environment.

After these two works it is rare that we find authors using the word Teotlalpan which were completely fell into disuse before the mid-seventeenth century. In the early twentieth century Francisco del Paso y Troncoso republished the "Relaciones geográficas" he guess in his personal point of view (and actually without any analysis) that Teotlalpan existed as a well-constituted province. This approach is taken up in 1949 by Sherburne F. Cook who without being totally accurate considers that the Mezquital Valley is the "Teotlalpan". That ambiguity lasts and again in our days, for example, some authors insist on using the term without delving into its basis and development, being actually only a geographical framework for describing the archaeological development in the area of Teotihuacan, Tula Xicocotitlan, Chupicuaro and Xajay cultures unrelated to the term Teotlalpan and Mezquital Valley.; mostly because the remains seem to have cultural relationship with the Otomi, dominant population in the region since time immemorial and it don't have relationship with nahuas. Then so talk about a "Province Teotlalpan" in ancient times it is a fiction. The real tributary provinces formed during the Mexica expansion in the north were Hueypochtlan, Axocopan, Xilotepec, Atotonilco. During the colonial period was named minor province to Teotlalpan until middle XVIII century, a big part of this land is known until now by the name of Valle del Mezquital.

This demarcation was diluted in three decades after the Conquest of Mexico and it turned in the Colonial divisions. No one Indigenous document draw the demarcation of a region or province called Teotlalpan, just as there is no record of armed uprisings of the peoples from north of the central lakes, its population either by trade agreement or quick submission, they produced huge amounts of quicklime and textile fibers since Teotihuacan times.

We should understand that the north was not important or priority for the Mexica state, hence the late consolidation; it wasn't also a threat because the people in the region did not form a unit or were part of some sort of confederation, another important factor is that the otomi people had maintained its independence through trade agreements and being allies of central power as well.

== See also ==
- Mezquital Valley
- Zumpango Region
- Chichimeca
- Tlacopan
- Tepanec
- Tula (Mesoamerican site)
- Cerro Mesa Ahumada
- Tlaxcala

== Bibliography ==
- Molina, Alonso de. (2004) Vocabulario en lengua mexicana y castellana y castellana y mexicana. Editorial Porrúa, México.
- Paso y Troncoso, Francisco del. (1905-1906) Papeles de Nueva España. 2.a Serie. 7 vols. Madrid, España.
- Siméon, Rémi (1988) Diccionario de la lengua náhuatl o mexicana Ed. Siglo XXI.
- CEHINHAC (1978). Teotlalpan. Pachuca: CEHINHAC.
- Palma Linares, Vladimira (2010). "La Teotlalpan, Tierra de los dioses: la etnicidad entre los otomíes" (8). Primer Circulo: 1–327. JSTOR 9786079148010.
- Karttunen, Frances (1983). An Analytical Dictionary of Nahuatl. Austin: University of Texas Press. ISBN 0-8061-2421-0.
- Palma Linares, Vladimira (2008). "Huipochtla, Tequixquiac, Xilotzingo y Tetlapanaloya cuatro altepeme de la Teotlalpan bajo el dominio Tenochca". Expresión Antropológica. Mexico City. ISSN 1405-745X.
- Vladimira, Palma Linares; Miguel Guevara Chumacero; Patricia Castillo Peña (2004). "Arqueología de género en el sur de la Teotlalpan: el caso de comunidades tributarias a la Triple Alianza". Boletín de Antropología Americana (in Spanish) (43 enero-diciembre). Pan American Institute of Geography and History: 163–190. ISSN 0252-841X. JSTOR 40978268.
- López Aguilar, Fernando (1997). "Las distinciones y las diferencias en la historia colonial del Valle del Mezquital" (PDF). Dimensión Antropológica (in Spanish). 9–10 (enero–agosto). México: INAH: 27–70.
- Cook, Sherburne F. (1949). The historical demography and ecology of the Teotlalpan. Ibero-Americana: 33. Berkeley University of California Press.
- Solar Valverde, Laura. (2003) Dinámica Cultural del Valle del Mezquital durante el Epiclásico. Publicado en el portal de FAMSI.
- Wright Carr, David Charles (1997). "El papel de los otomíes en las culturas del Altiplano Central, 5000 a.C 1650 a d.C" (PDF). Relaciones (in Spanish). 73. México: Colegio de Michoacán. Archived from the original (PDF) on 2016-02-16.
