= Zumpango Region =

Coordinates: 19.8142°N 99.0837°W

Zumpango is a region, located in the north of the State of Mexico in the country of the same name. It is also known as the Region XVI Zumpango and has seen major population growth. It has a surface area of 8.305 km^{2} and occupies 12.8% of the state's territory. The seat of the Zumpango Region is Zumpango de Ocampo city.

The region is dominated by dry and moderate sub-humid climates and the reliefs fence with lomerios that part with the Eje Neovolcánico located at a northern pass leading out of the Valley of Mexico and Mezquital Valley, this territory was located inside the old Aztec region named the Teotlalpan.

Agricultural production is very important to the region, and ranching and craftwork are also part of its development. This region is named by the people of Zumpangolandia.

== History ==
=== Archaeology ===
In May 2020, discovery of remains of at least sixty mammoths (included male, female, young mammoths) and 15 people were uncovered by the National Institute of Anthropology and History headed by archaeologist Sánchez Nava under the Mexico City Santa-Lucia airport, in the former Lake Xaltocan. According to the INAH, mammoth skeletons revealed in what used to be the shallow part of the lake were better anatomically preserved than those found in the deeper parts of the former lake. Mammoths probably got stuck in the lake and died.

== Geography ==
The location of the region is in the north of the state of Mexico, and is located in the low extreme geographical coordinates of Greenwich, north latitude 19º50'23" minimum, 19º58'28" maximum, west longitude 99°04'30" minimum, 99°13'35" maximum.

The town of Zumpango de Ocampo, a municipal seat, has governing jurisdiction over the following municipalities: Apaxco, Hueypoxtla, Jaltenco, Nextlalpan, Tequixquiac, Tonanitla and Zumpango. The total region extends 96.37 and borders the regions of Ecatepec Region, Hueypoxtla, Tultitlán Region and the state of Hidalgo.

=== Hydrography ===
The Gran Canal de Desagüe is an artificial channel that crossing Tequixquiac, was named Xothé river in Otomi language, this channel connect with Tula river and Enthó dam. Other small rivers are Río Salado of Hueypoxtla, Treviño river and La Pila river, which connect with Gran Canal.

The municipal seat is in a small, elongated valley but most of the municipality is on a high mesa which transitions from the Valley of Mexico to the Mezquital Valley. The highest mountain in Tequixquiac is the Cerro Mesa Ahumada, it rises 2,600 metres (8,500 ft) above sea level, on the border between the municipalities of Huehuetoca and Apaxco.

Municipality	Area (km^{2}) 2010	Population 2005 Census	Population 2010 Census	Population density (/km^{2} 2010)
Apaxco	80.34	25,738	27,521	42.1
Hueypoxtla	246.95	36,512	39,864	39.6
Jaltenco	3.30	26,359	26,328	113.7
Nextlalpan	42.49	22,507	34,374	41.3
Tequixquiac	96.37	28,039	33,907	82.04
Tonanitla	17.10	8,081	10,216	41.3
Zumpango	244.08	127,988	159,647	41.3
Region XVI Zumpango	2795.1	275,224	331,857	56.5

== Region municipalities ==
- Hueypoxtla
- Tequixquiac

== Government ==
=== Deputation ===
Local mayor	Time
Raúl Domínguez Rex	2006–2009
Daniel Parra Ángeles	2009–2012
Enrique Mazutti Delgado	2013–2015
Abel Domínguez Azuz	2015–2018

=== Subdivition of Zumpango Region ===
  - Santa María Apaxco
  - Apaxco de Ocampo
  - Pérez de Galeana
  - Coyotillos
  - Casa Blanca
  - Hueypoxtla
  - Guadalupe Nopala
  - San José Bata (Emiliano Zapata)
  - San Francisco Zacacalco
  - San Pedro la Gloria
  - San Marcos Jilotzingo
  - Santa María Ajoloapan
  - Tezontlalpan de Zapata
  - Tianguistongo
  - Rancho el Carmen
  - Alborada Jaltenco
  - San Andrés Jaltenco
  - Santa Ana Nextlalpan
  - San Miguel Xaltocán
  - San Juan Zitlaltepec
  - Santa Inés
  - Santa María Tonanitla
  - Santiago Tequixquiac
  - Tlapanaloya
  - Colonia Wenceslao Labra
  - Zumpango de Ocampo
