= Teoloyucan =

- Municipality
- Coat of arms
- Interactive map of Teoloyucan
- Coordinates: 19°44′39″N 99°10′52″W
- Country: Mexico
- State: State of Mexico
- Municipal Seat: City of Teoloyucan
- City Founded: 1436
- Municipality Founded: 1825

Area
  - Municipality: 31.52 km^{2} (12.17 sq mi)
- Elevation (of seat): 2,250 m (7,380 ft)

Population (2010) Municipality
  - Municipality: 63,115
  - Seat: 54,202
- Time zone: UTC-6 (Central)
- Postal code (of seat): 54770

Teoloyucan is a municipality located in the State of Mexico, Mexico. Its municipal seat and second largest city is the city of Teoloyucan. It lies 45 km (28 mi) north of the Federal District (Distrito Federal) in the northeastern part of the state of México, and is part of the Greater Mexico City urban area. During the colonial period the area's name had a number of variations, including Teohuilloyocan, Teohuilloyucan, Theoloyucan, Teoloyucan Coaquileque and Tehuilloyocan. The name comes from Nahuatl meaning place of glass or place of crystal rock.

== The city ==
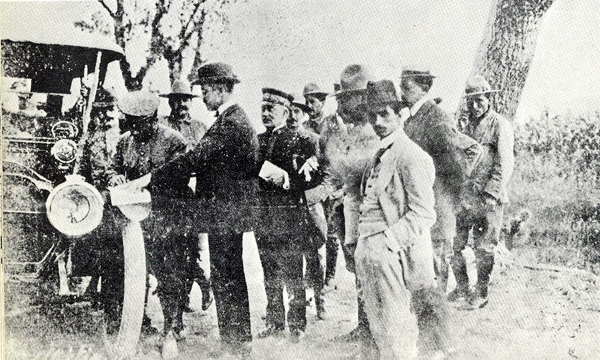
Treaty of Teoloyucan

According to the Codex Mendoza, the settlement is mentioned as Itzcoatl conquered this area, meaning it existed prior to 1436, probably owing its importance to its proximity to Cuautitlán. After the Spanish Conquest, in 1565, the area and its people were entrusted to Alonso de Ávila Alvarado. The Franciscans came a year later to evangelize. In 1570, the town was described as having four principal districts divided into 8 neighborhoods each, indicating the area was already well-organized with a population of over 1,000 people, half of whom were Mexica and the other half Otomi. The population of the city as of 2010 was 63,115.

The city has two notable churches from the 17th century, the Church of Santa Cruz and the Church of San Juan. There are also plans to establish the Museo Comunitario de Teoloyucan (Community Museum of Teoloyucan). The city's patron saint is San Antonio de Padua.

The Magnetic Observatory of Teoloyucan was originally established in the School of Mining in Mexico City in the 18th century by Antonio Alzate and Alexander von Humboldt. In 1903, it was moved to Cuajimalpa then again to its current location in 1911 due to the development of the Mexico City metropolitan area. It was originally located in the town's municipal palace but when this building was remodeled in 1978, the observatory again moved to its current location next to the municipal cemetery at the town's edge.

== The municipality ==
As municipal seat, the city of Teoloyucan has governing jurisdiction over the following communities: Acolco, Analco, Atzacoalco, Axalpa, Cuaxoxoca, Colonia Agricola de Santo Tomas, Hacienda de San José Puente Grande, La Era, San Bartolo, San Sebastian, Santa Cruz, Santa Cruz del Monte, Santa María Caliacac, Santiago, San Juan, Santo Tomas, Tepanquiahuac, Tlatenco, Tlatilco and Zimapan. The total population of the municipality in 2010 was 63,115.

The municipality was created shortly after the end of the Mexican War of Independence in 1821 and in the same year as the creation of the State of Mexico in 1825. The Teoloyucan Treaties were signed n this municipality during the Mexican revolution. The municipality borders with the municipalities of Coyotepec, Zumpango, Cuautitlán Izcalli, Cuautitlán, Melchor Ocampo, Jaltenco, Nextlalpan, and Tepotzotlán. It has a territory of 31.52 km^{2} (12.17 sq mi).

While agriculture and raising livestock are still important economic activities, industrialization has begun in this area. Among the products manufactured are: packaged food, textiles, paper products, petroleum and plastic products, as well as machinery and metal parts.
