= Lake Zumpango =

Lake in Mexico

Coordinates: 19.267°N 98.983°W

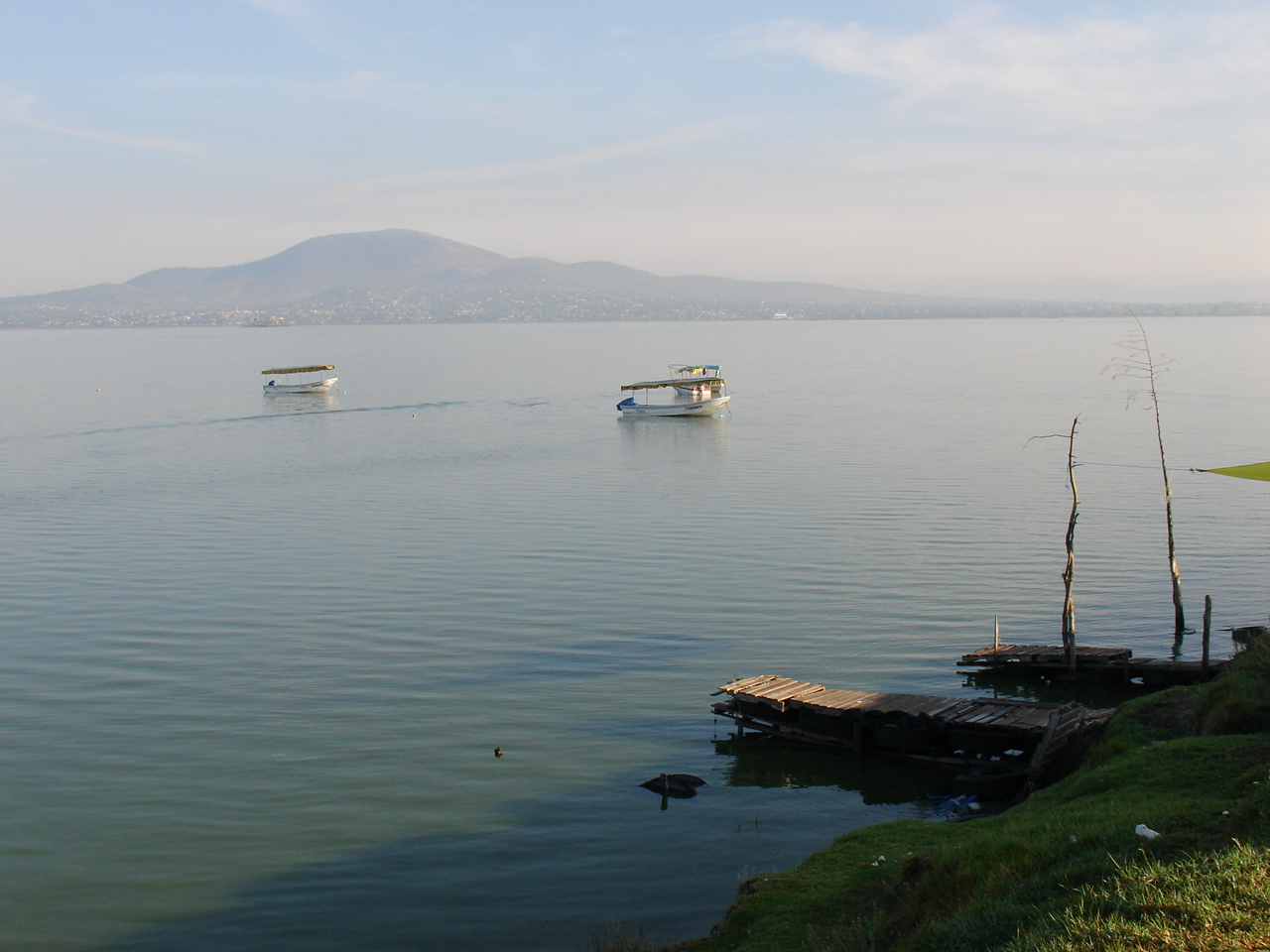
Lake Zumpango, 2007

The Valley of Mexico, at the time of the Spanish Conquest in 1519.

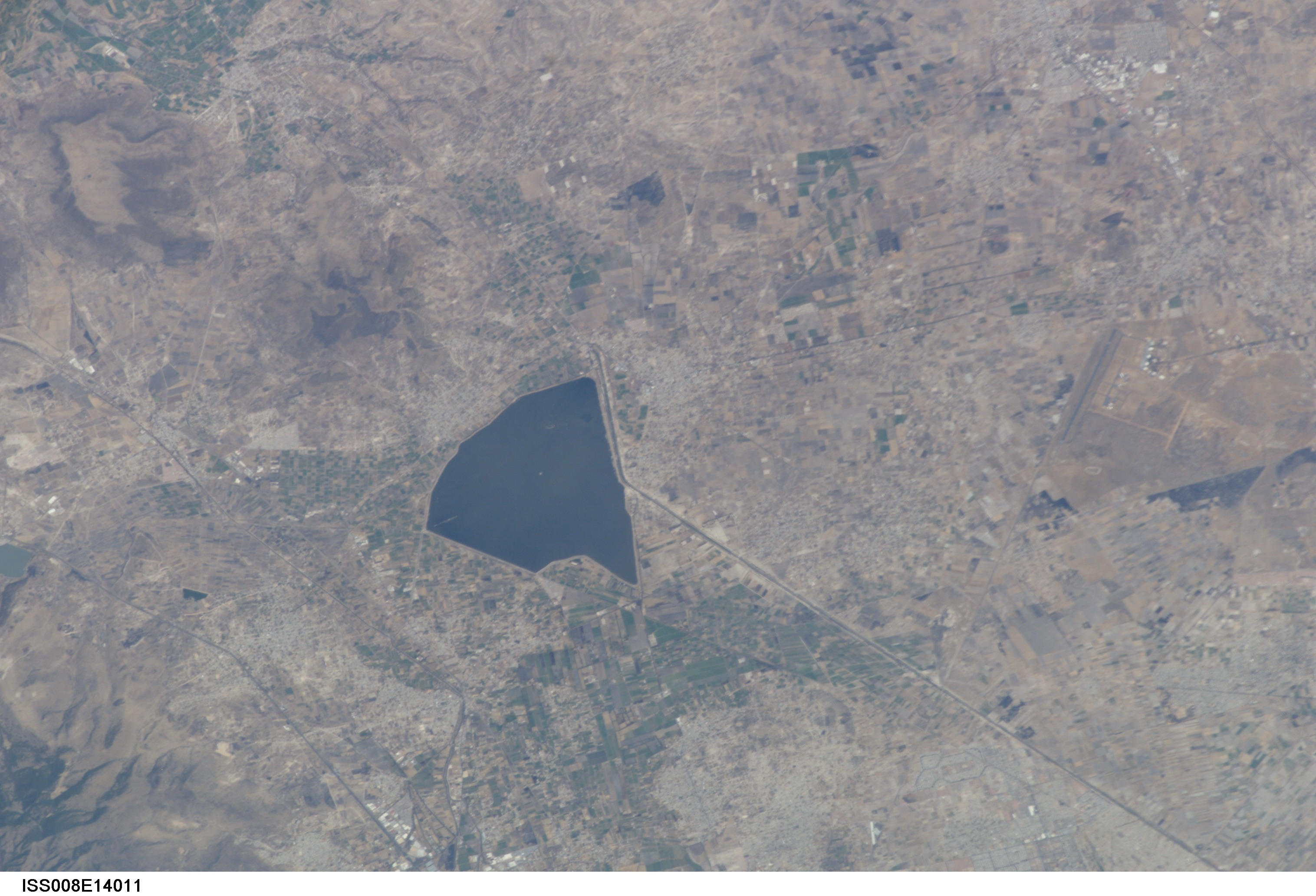
Aerial view of Zumpango, 2004

Lake Zumpango (Spanish: Laguna de Zumpango; Nahuatl languages: Tzompanco, lit. 'string of scalps') is an endorheic basin located in the Valley of Mexico in the municipality of Zumpango and adjacent to the municipality of Teoloyucan. Tzompanco was formerly the northernmost of five interconnected lakes, covering about 1,500 square kilometers (580 sq mi) (the other lakes being Lake Xaltocan, (Note: Nahuatl languages: xāltocān) Lake Xochimilco, Lake Chalco and Lake Texcoco (Note: Nahuatl languages: Tetzco(h)co)). The Valley of Mexico was a centre for several pre-Columbian civilizations including Teotihuacan, the Toltec, and the Aztec Empire. After the conquest of the Aztec Empire, the Spaniards began to drain the lakes' waters to control flooding. Over the centuries Lake Zumpango lost its inflows and outflows and became polluted by sewage and garbage dumps. However, in recent years, the lagoon is becoming cleaner again.

== History ==
=== Pre-Columbian history ===
Settlements were recorded on the shores of Lake Zumpango dating back to the period of 200 BC to 100 AD.

=== Spanish colonial rule and the Mexico City metropolitan area ===
The idea of opening drainage canals first came about after a flood of the colonial Mexico City in 1555. The first canal was begun in 1605 to drain the waters of Lake Zumpango north through Huehuetoca which would also divert waters from the Cuautitlán River away from the lakes and toward the Tula River. This project was undertaken by Enrico Martínez and he devoted 25 years of his life to it. He did succeed in building a canal in this area, calling it Nochistongo, leading waters to the Tula Valley, but the drainage was not sufficient to avoid the Great Flood of 1629 in the city. Another canal, which would be dubbed the "Grand Canal" was built parallel to the Nochistongo one ending in Tequixquiac.

== Biology ==
Lake Zumpango was part of the original habitat of the axolotl, an amphibian which is now critically endangered due to its destruction.
