= Zumpango =

- Municipality
- Zumpango
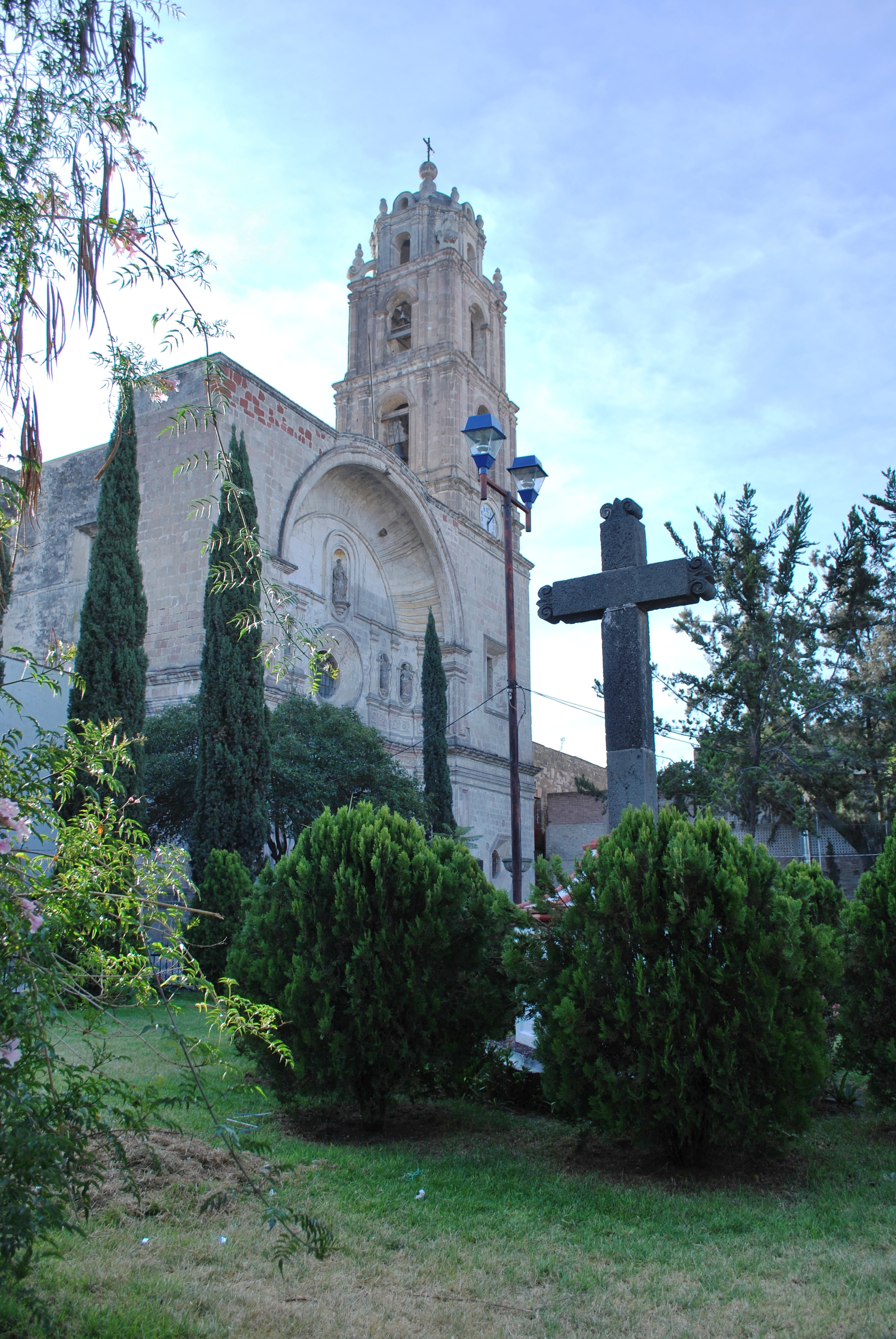
- Parish of Purísima Concepción

- Location in Mexico
- Coordinates: 19°47′49″N 99°05′57″W
- Country: Mexico
- State: State of Mexico
- Region: Zumpango Region
- Municipal Status: 1820
- Seat: Zumpango de Ocampo

Government
  - Municipal President: Enrique Mazutti Delgado (2016-2018)

Area
  - Municipality: 244.08 km^{2} (94.24 sq mi)
- Elevation of seat: 2,261 m (7,418 ft)

Population (2020)
  - Municipality: 280,455
- Time zone: UTC-6 (Central)
- Postal code (of seat): 55600
- Area code: 588
- Website: (in Spanish) Official site

Zumpango is a municipality located in the northeastern part of the state of Mexico in Zumpango Region. It lies directly north of Mexico City within the Greater Mexico City urban area. The municipal seat, Zumpango de Ocampo, lies near Lake Zumpango, the last of the five interconnected lakes which covered much of the Valley of Mexico in the pre Hispanic period. The name Zumpango is derived from the Nahuatl word "Tzompanco" which means string of scalps.

The municipality is located in the northeast part of the State of Mexico, part of the state’s panhandle that extends over the north and down on the east side of the Federal District of Mexico City. The municipality has a territory of 244.08km2 and borders the municipalities of Tequixquiac, Hueypoxtla, Teoloyucan, Cuautitán, Nextlapan, Jaltenco, Tecámac, Coyotepec and Huehuetoca as well as Tizayuca in the state of Hidalgo. Zumpango is considered to be part of the metropolitan area of Mexico City as part of the Cuautitlán-Texcoco zone north of the city proper. Zumpango is the location of the Felipe Ángeles International Airport, which was opened in 2022 to be the second commercial airport serving Greater Mexico City.

== Geography ==
Lake Zumpango at north of Lake of Texcoco.

About half of the territory is flat, mostly in the south with hills and small mountains in the north. The highest elevation is the Cerro del Zitlaltepec at 1650 meters above sea level. The main surface water is Lake Zumpango, which extends over 2,000 hectares. There are also some seasonal streams, the Gran Canal and other tunnels dug to drain the Valley of Mexico.

Lake Zumpango is the last of the five interconnected lakes that covered much of the Valley of Mexico in the pre Hispanic period. Since the 17th century, efforts to control flooding in Mexico City have worked to drain the lake system. The first effort was in 1607–1608, when a canal was dug to drain Lake Zumpango into the Tula River. It lowered lake levels but did not eliminate flooding. At the end of the 19th century a canal and tunnel brought water from the other lakes in the Valley, now disconnected, into Lake Zumpango. Further drainage efforts and over pumping of groundwater continued to dry Lake Zumpango until it disappeared in 1975. It was then decided to bring the lake back as a regulator, filling it with water from a new drainage canal called the Canal del Desague. This use of the lake was opposed by local people in 1983 and 1986 because of the dumping of wastewater, which led to compromises and infrastructure for irrigation. Today, the lake extends into neighboring Teoloyucan, Huehuetoca, Melchor Ocampo, Hueypoxtla and Tequixquiac municipalities, but there is significant environmental issues because there is no agreement or declaration to protect the lake.

The lake is semi artificial as it is created and used as a water regulator, with much of its volume entering through several canals and other drainage, mostly from Mexico City. In the dry, season, the lake’s volume drops by half. About fifty migratory species of birds come to the lake in the winter, with the most commonly found being pelicans, ducks, storks and sea gulls, with an estimated 5,000 birds per year. The lake contains various species of carp, frogs, turtles, snails and freshwater shrimp. Over 600 families, mostly dedicated to farming, fishing and other related activities, depend on the lake. The lake attracts weekend visitors despite the poor water quality because of the good climate and abundant local vegetation. The lake receives wastewater from various municipalities, much of it untreated, as well as tons of trash from Mexico City via the Santo Tomas Canal. Non-native water lilies were a major problem, but they were eradicated by the state in 2003. State authorities have said that it would take at least 20 million pesos to clean the lake sufficiently for ecotourism as well as build facilities for visitors and reforestation efforts. There are currently boating excursions available; however, most of the boats are old and lacking safety equipment. This has led to accidents on the lake including some deaths.

The climate is temperate with an average annual temperature of 14C. The coldest months are from November to March when temperatures can reach -2.3C. The warmest months are from April to June when temperatures can reach 31C. The average annual rainfall is between 600 and 800 mm with most rain falling in June. Freezes are not uncommon in the winter and hail can fall in May and June during thunderstorms. Prevailing winds are from the north and are strongest in February.

=== Flora & fauna ===
Typical plants for the area include nopal cactus, maguey, other types of cactus, palms, cypress, willows and eucalyptus. Wildlife includes rodents, opossums, coyotes, lizards, around the community of Zitlaltepec, there are wooded hills. Various birds inside this place, including herons, hummingbirds and falcons as well as water fowl such as storks and ducks; in winter, the Lake Zumpango has got migratory birds as pelicans.

== History ==
This is derived from the practice of displaying the skulls of defeated warriors on a shrine called a tzompantli. The municipality uses the Aztec glyph for a tzompantli for its seal.

The area has small settlements as early as 200 BCE along the old shoreline of Lake Zumpango. The quantity and size of settlements grew significantly between 100 and 700 CE, with evidence of ceramic production. The population decreased between 700 and 900 CE, with some recovery between 900 and 1100 CE. Between 1150 and 1520 the area becomes dominated by Nahuatl speaking peoples, eventually dominated by Tenochtitlan and the Aztecs as they took over the Valley of Mexico. The first known noble to rule the area was Tochpanehecatl in 1216.

After their conquest of the Aztec Empire, the Spanish arrived to settle the area in 1525. Most of Zumpango came under the administration of Cuautitlán with about a fourth under the jurisdiction of Zitlaltepec. In 1596, Zumpango became independent as an Alcaldía Mayor, which gave it jurisdiction over Zitlaltepec. In the early colonial era, Zumpango was part of an encomienda under Alonso de Avila. In 1604, many of the indigenous were moved to the main town of Zumpango, depopulating villages. The Spanish took over the lands, creating haciendas such as the Hacienda de Santa Lucía, Hacienda Santa Inés and the Hacienda de Xalpan.

Zumpango became a municipality in 1820 as part of the acceptance of the Cadiz Constitution, before the end of the Mexican War of Independence. In 1861, the villages of Cuautlalpan, Xoloc, Reyes Acosac, and the Haciendas of San Juan de la Labor and of Santa Lucia were added to the municipality. In the same year, the community of Zumpango was officially declared a town with the name of Villa de Zumpango de Victoria. In 1877, it was declared a city and the name changed to the current one, Zumpango de Ocampo, with the appendage honoring Melchor Ocampo.

In the 19th century, a drainage tunnel for the Mexico City area was dug, reaching the municipality. This tunnel emptied water into the Colorado River, a tributary of the Tula River. Further drainage projects were undertaken in the 20th century along with a rail line, which worked to develop the area’s economy through construction and maintenance. This rail line would expand in the 1920s and operate until mid century.

During the Mexican Revolution, Pedro Campa was Zumpango’s local revolutionary with a band of about three hundred men allied with the Liberation Army of the South. After the war, local leader Wenceslao Labra García worked to establish commonly owned lands called ejidos in the area.

The Spanish Republican community arrived at Zumpango in the 20th century. They were farmers and peasants, Spaniards founded 1 de Mayo colony in San Sebastian, worked in ranches and haciendas and others in Zumpango municipality commerce, they opened furnitures, bakeries, restaurants, stationeries and shoe shops.

In 1948, former railroad workshops were converted in a textile factory called La Hortensia, which prompted highway construction to replace the rail line and another drainage canal was built.

A new international airport was proposed for the municipality in the 1970s. Land was expropriated in 1974 by the federal government in this and neighboring municipalities. However, the project was opposed by locals which set off a decades-long political struggled. This struggled ended in favor of the opponents and the expropriated was revoked in 2001.

Zumpango’s proximity and lake has spurred residential development, to make it one of the fastest growing municipalities in the metropolitan area. The municipality is expected to have 500,000 residents by 2015 as there is demand for about 113,000 new housing units per year in the area north of Mexico City. The main developers in the area are Geo, Homex, Sadasi-Sare and Urbi, with most of the developments located along the major highways and roads of the municipality. While the area is still relatively rural, the rush for construction has limited the amount of developable land and there are now requests to allow for apartment buildings of four floors and higher.

The building boom has resulted in tens of thousands of small homes built for working-class families. However, many of the homes are uninhabited or the breadwinners are not there most of the week because local employment and convenient transportation has not kept up with the growth. The homes are popular because of the addition of community gardens, security and private streets. Most of the homes are very small, between 32 and fifty meters2. Although Zumpango is close to a number of employment centers, most transportation, public and private, is on crowded roads which lead to long and expensive commutes. The commute between Zumpago from Indios Verdes, the main commuter station in the north of Mexico City, takes about two hours.

== Politics ==
The municipal government consists of a municipal government, one official called a síndico and ten official called regidores.

Mayor	Time
Rogelio Muñoz Serna	2003–2005
Luis Decaro Delgado	2005–2007
Enrique Mazutti Delgado	2008–2010
Alejandro C. Flores Jimenez	2010–2012
Abel Neftalí Dominguez Azuz	2012–2015
Enrique Mazutti Delgado	2016–

== Economy ==
As of 2005, the municipality had 23,427 residences, almost all of which were privately owned, up from 17,437 in 1995. Almost all have running water and electricity, and just under 90% have sewerage but only 35% have street lighting and 55% have garbage service.

Just over seventy percent of the land in the municipality is used for agriculture with the rest divided among residential areas, industrial zones and other uses. About 25% is irrigated and the rest is farmed only during the rainy season. These fields primarily produce alfalfa, corn and barley. Most livestock is domestic fowl. The raising of pigs and cattle has diminished in the area. Agriculture and livestock production employs 13% of the population. Finca Santo Domingo is an exotic and miniature animal farm which extends over 20,000 m2. Species include llamas, kangaroos, camels, deer, parrots, peacocks and other animals native to China, Arabia, Belgium, Argentina and South Africa with most miniature species such as horses and cattle imported from the United States. It is a breeding facility for many of these animals, with buyers being mostly circuses and collectors.

Mining, manufacturing and construction employ 45% of the population. There are deposits of sand, black and red tezontle and another building stone called tepetate. Industry is limited to small workshops and other concerns producing textiles and food products such as tortillas.

Commerce and services employs 42% of the population. There are about 2,800 stationary businesses with 1700 located in the municipal seat. The municipal market contains 350 locales, supplemented by about ten tianguis markets in various parts of the municipality during the week. The largest tianguis market occurs on Fridays in the town of Zumpango. There is one hotel, four family owned inns, a motel, various restaurants and a few bars. Developed by GIM, Town Center Zumpango opened in 2010 and includes a Walmart, Sam's Club and Cinépolis movie theater. Other businesses include Vips, Coppel, Banamex, Steren, USA shoes, Nutrisa, Telcel, Flexi and various eateries.

== Transportation ==
Various highways cross through the municipality, linking it with Mexico City, Pachuca, Cuautitlán and smaller communities such as Ojo de Agua, Apaxco, San Miguel Xaltocán, Nextlalpan, San Lucas Xoloc and Tecámac. Three rail lines pass through: one linking Mexico City, Pachuca and Veracruz, another linking Mexico City and Guadalajara and the third linking Mexico City to points north such as Nuevo Laredo. There is no main bus station. Most public transportation terminates at the main municipal market.

The municipality is host to the Felipe Ángeles International Airport.

== Demography ==
Town	Population
Total	
Zumpango de Ocampo	
San Juan Zitlaltepec	
San Bartolo Cuautlalpan	
Santa María Cuevas	

The population has grown from 71,413 in 1990 to 114, 257 in 2000 to 127,988 in 2005 with growth rates varying between under three percent to just under six percent per year. About 97% of the population is Catholic. There are no cohesive indigenous communities and fewer than 700 speak an indigenous languages such as Nahuatl or Otomi .

=== Zumpango de Ocampo ===
The city of Zumpango is 120 km from the state capital of Toluca, located 55 km north of Mexico City as part of this city’s metropolitan area. The Parish of Purísima Concepción was founded in the first half of the 16th century and expanded in 1711. It was part of a monastery complex, with the cloister portion now offices for the church. The primary school in the center of town was the headquarters for the construction of drainage projects for the Valley of Mexico. Other important structures include the municipal palace, the Bonfil-Rivera House and the Guadalupe Meléndez House. The most traditional dish in the municipality is called “taco placero” most often sold on Fridays at the tianguis market. These consist of various ingredients such as barbacoa, nopal cactus, tomatoes, cheese, cilantro, pork rinds, beans and more.

Zumpango had its first Festival Aerostático or Balloon Festival in 2011, which took place over the lake with eight hot air balloons participating.

== Education ==
The municipality has a total of 107 schools from preschool to vocational technical high schools, adult schools, a teachers’ college and a satellite of the Universidad Autónoma del Estado de México called the Centro Universitario UAEM Zumpango. The illiteracy rate is just under eight percent.

== Culture ==
Other important communities include San Juan Zitlaltepec and San Bartolo Cuautlalpan, which are mostly farming traditional communities and San Pedro de la Laguna, known for its production of fireworks. There are over thirty traditional festivals each year in various parts of the municipality, most with a religious basis. The most important is 8 December in honor of the patron saint of Zumpango, the Virgin of the Most Pure Conception. Other important festivals include the feast day of the patron of San Bartolo Cuautlalpan which is noted for their version of the Moors and Christians dance, Corpus Christi and Day of the Dead.

== Sports and entertainment ==
The first sport practiced in Zumpango has been the charrería, when the Spanish first settled in this town, they were under orders to raise horses, but not to allow indigenous to ride. In Zumpango makes state competitions in charreadas. The bullfighting are other entertainment, in this municipality has got bullring or plaza is named El Andaluz and its Spanish heritage of the Zumpango people.

== Notable people ==
- Huitzilihuitl, born in Zumpango, tlahtoani of Mexico Tenochtitlan.
- Wenceslao Labra Garcia, born in Zumpango, was a State of Mexico governor.

== See also ==
- Lake Zumpango
