= Lake Xochimilco =

Body of water in Mexico City

- Location within Mexico
- Location: Xochimilco, Mexico City, Mexico
- Coordinates: 19.285°N 99.102°W
- Type: endorheic lake

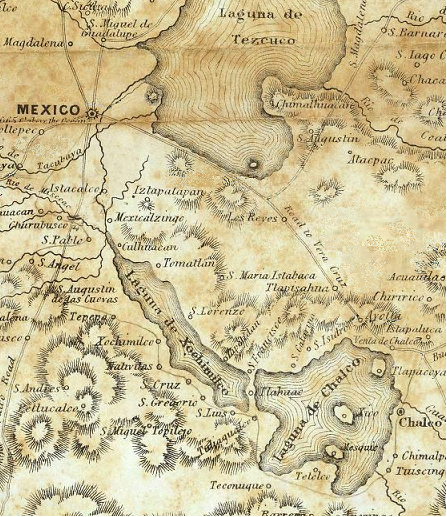
Lake Xochimilco, in a detail from the 1847 Bruff/Disturnell map

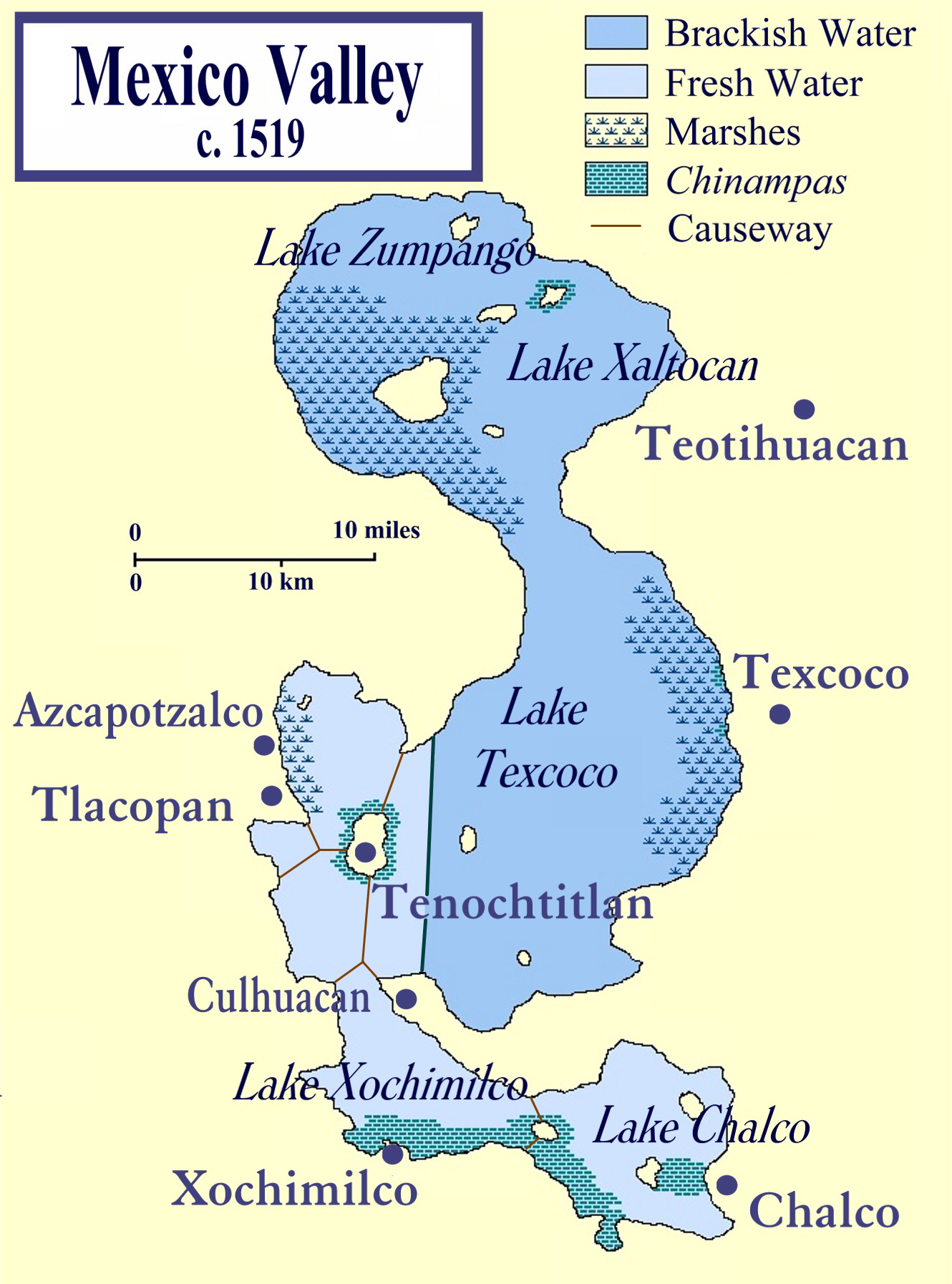
The Valley of Mexico at the time of the Spanish conquest, c. 1519

Lake Xochimilco (Spanish pronunciation: [sotʃiˈmilko]; Nahuatl languages: Xōchimīlco, pronounced [ʃoːtʃiˈmiːlko]) is an ancient endorheic lake, located in the present-day Borough of Xochimilco in southern Mexico City. It is the last remaining habitat of the axolotl.

The lake is within the Valley of Mexico hydrological basin, in central Mexico.

== History ==
=== Geological ===
Lake Xochimilco is part of a series of historical lakes, which included:

1. Lake Texcoco — brackish
2. Lake Zumpango
3. Lake Xaltocan
4. Lake Chalco — fresh water

Lake Xochimilco was originally a part of an even larger lake, Lake Texcoco, during the last glacial period. Between 12,000 and 6,000 years ago, the climate in central Mexico warmed and the snowmelt that once fed Lake Texcoco virtually disappeared. This caused the lake surface to drop hundreds of feet over the next several thousand years. By 2,000 years ago, Xochimilco became a bay in the southern portion of Texcoco. Then around the 13th or 14th century the Aztecs built large causeways effectively creating a new lake.

=== Mesoamerican ===
These lakes were the home of many Mesoamerican cultures, including the Teotihuacanos, the Toltecs, and the Aztecs.

Due to its shallow waters and the freshwater springs that lined the south shore of the lake, Lake Xochimilco was the center of chinampa agriculture in the centuries of the pre-Columbian era. This made the region a prime target for the expansionist Aztecs, who obtained control over the lake in a series of campaigns, from c. 1432 until 1440, during the reign of the Aztec Hueyi Tlatoani, Itzcóatl.

=== Spanish colonial ===
After the Spanish conquered the Aztec Empire in 1521, they destroyed the dams and sluice gates. This, along with the sharp decline in the native population, led to the near-abandonment of the chinampa gardens.

== Description ==
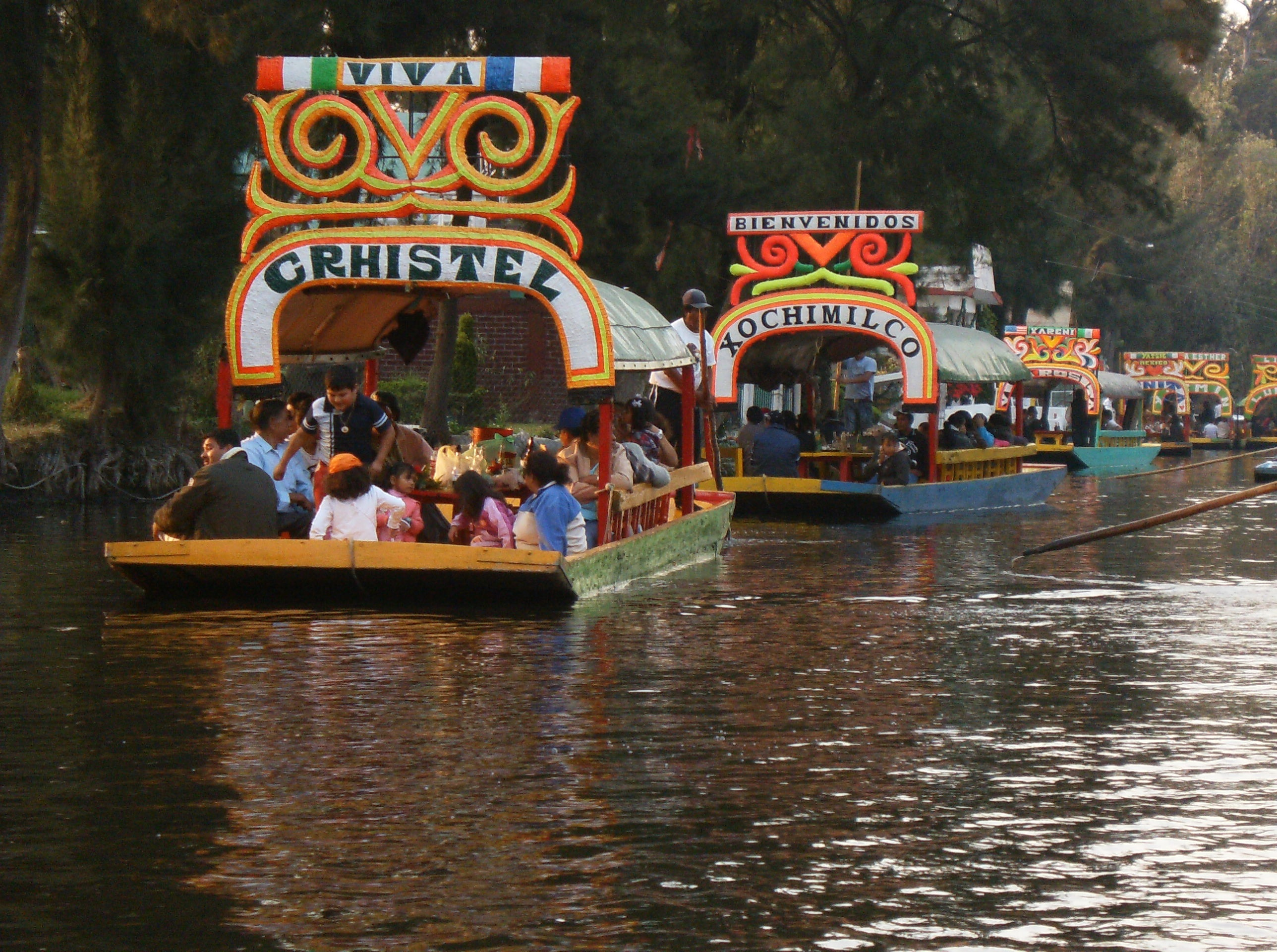
Colourful trajineras (rafts) on Lake Xochimilco

The five lakes within the Valley of Mexico have now largely disappeared, drained to reduce flooding. Only the Xochimilco canals remain from the original Lake Xochimilco. Chinamperos work their chinampa gardens between the canals.

Xochimilco Lake remnants are part of large urban parks in Mexico City, with water-based and land recreation. Colourful trajineras (rafts) take groups of people on the remaining canals for pleasure.

Xochimilco Ecological Park and Plant Market was established as a nature reserve and park, and is the largest park in Mexico City after Chapultepec. There is also the 13-hectare (32-acre) Xochimilco/Cuemanco Plant Market, the largest in Latin America. The market is on chinampa land.

=== Conservation ===
The area was declared a biological reserve by the Mexican government in 1984. It became part of a UNESCO World Heritage Site in 1987.

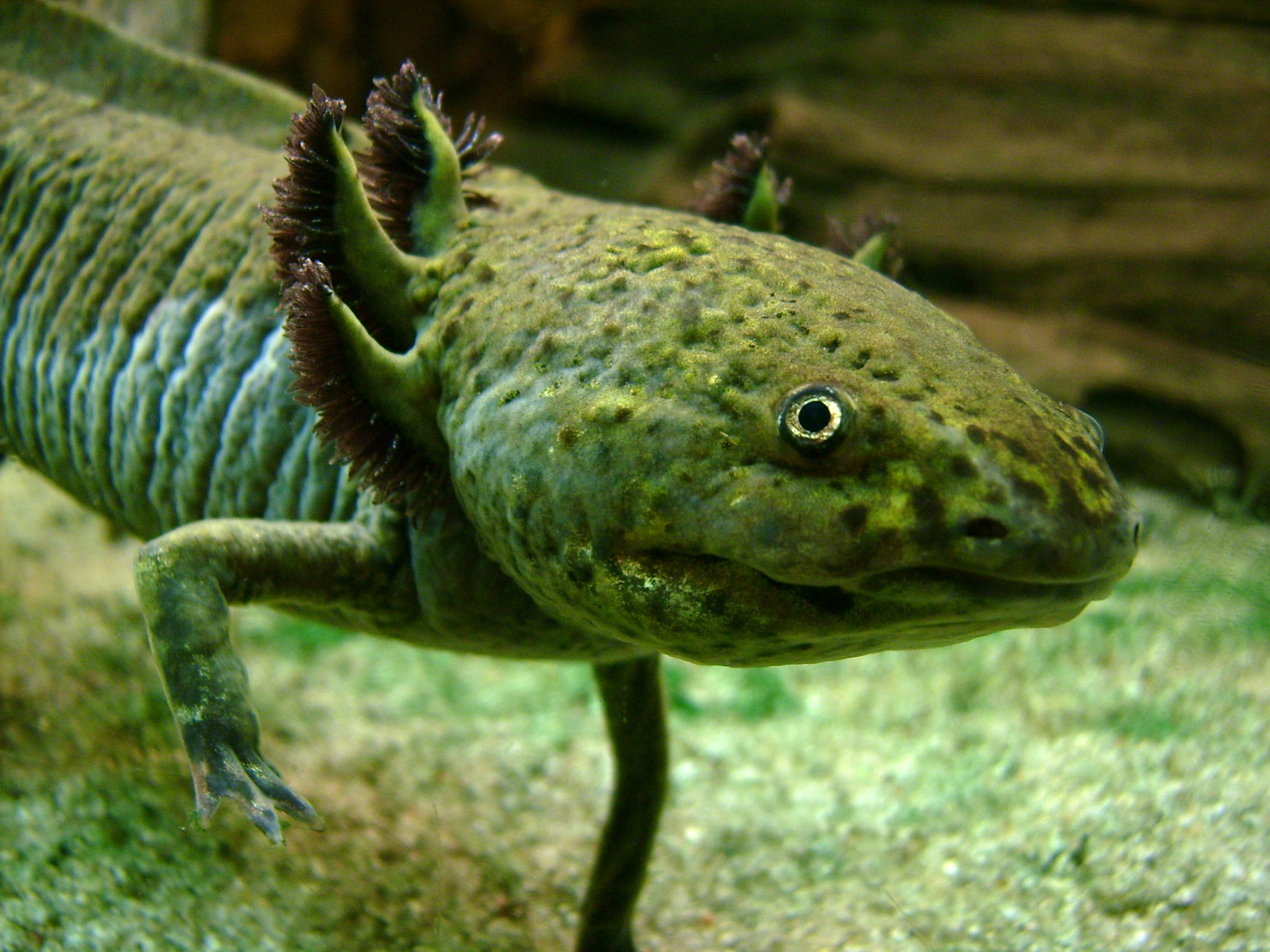
Ambystoma mexicanum, Axolotl

Lake Xochimilco is the last remaining native habitat for the axolotl, a species of mole salamander endemic to Mexico. Until Lake Chalco was drained, the species had also been present there. Given Lake Xochimilco's present extensively compromised and reduced state, and the accelerating impact of Mexico City's urban growth, as of 2008 axolotl in the wild are listed as a critically endangered species by the IUCN.

=== Google Doodle ===
On Saturday, May 20, 2023, Google honored Lake Xochimilco with a Google Doodle. The doodle invited players to look for axolotls in the lake and take pictures by clicking on them. The goal of the doodle was to photograph five types of axolotls within the duration of the game.

== See also ==
- Bosque de Nativitas Park, Xochimilco
