= Jaltenco =

- Municipality and town
- Location of the municipality in Mexico State

- Location in Mexico
- Coordinates: 19°45′04″N 99°05′35″W
- Country: Mexico
- State: Mexico (state)

Area
  - Total: 47 km^{2} (18 sq mi)

Population (2005)
  - Total: 26,359
- Time zone: UTC-6 (Central Standard Time)
- Website: Official website

Jaltenco is the municipality located in Zumpango Region, a small municipality in this region, covers an area of 4.7 km^{2}, this territory is in the northeastern part of the state of Mexico in Mexico. The municipal seat is San Andrés Jaltenco, although both are commonly called only San Andrés. The municipality is located at a northern pass leading out of the Valley of Mexico to 60 kilometers north of Mexico City and about 200 km northeast of the state capital of Toluca.

As of 2005, the municipality had a total population of 26,359. The municipality has an exclave, Alborada.

== Geography ==
The location of the municipality is north of Mexico City, and is located in the low extreme geographical coordinates of Greenwich, north latitude 19º45'23" minimum, 19º46'28" maximum, west longitude 99°05'30" minimum, 99°06'35" maximum.

The town of San Andrés Jaltenco, a municipal seat, has governing jurisdiction over the following to Alborada Jaltenco. The total municipality extends 4,7 km^{2} and borders with the municipalities of Zumpango and Nextlalpan. The area of this municipality is 15 km^{2} (59.85 sq mi).

=== Flora and fauna ===
90% of Jaltenco municipality is urbanized; all territory is plane lands, live here small mammals as mouse, rabbit, bat and gopher, birds as sparrow. The flora is century plants, prickly pears, chollas and others.
