= San Juan Zitlaltepec =

- Town
- Location in Mexico
- Coordinates: 19°43′N 99°3′W
- Country: Mexico
- State: Mexico State
- Municipality: Zumpango

Population (2010)
  - Total: 19 600

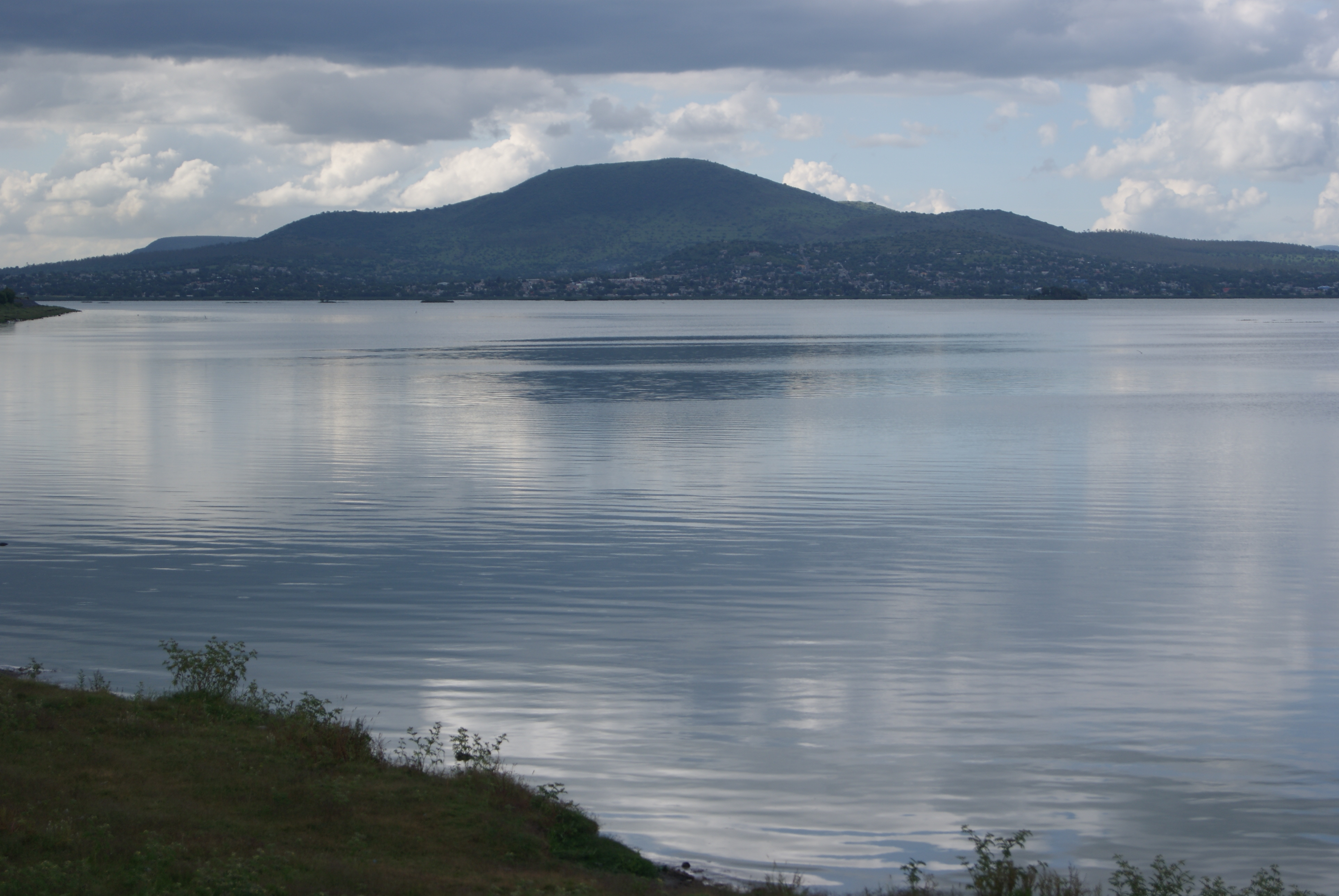
A view of San Juan Zitlaltepec from Zumpango lagoon

San Juan Zitlaltepec is a town of Zumpango, in the state of Mexico State, north of Mexico Valley. The name Zitlaltepec comes from Náhuatl meaning mountain of the star.
