= Enrico Martínez =

Spanish cosmographer

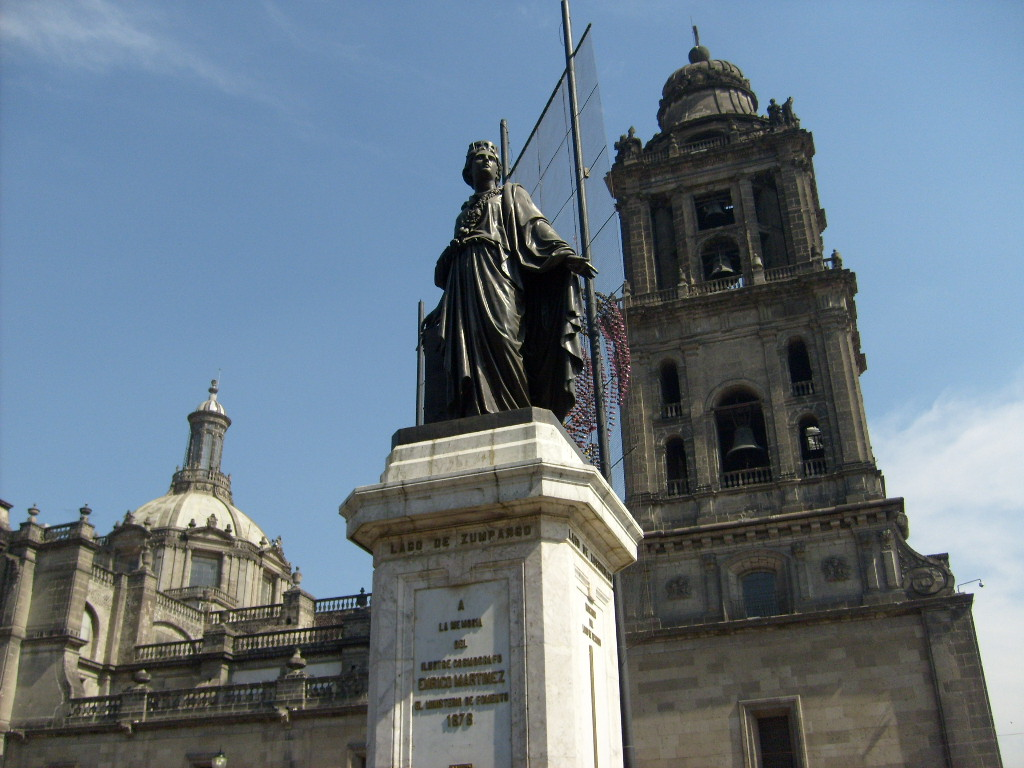
Monument to Enrico Martínez in Mexico City

Enrico Martínez, also known as Henri Martín or Enrico Martín (died 1632) was cosmographer to the King of Spain, interpreter for the Spanish Inquisition, publisher, and hydraulic engineer.

== Biography ==
He was born Heinrich Martin in Hamburg on an unknown date. According to some he was of Spanish descent; Alexander von Humboldt says that he was either a German or Dutchman, and according to others a Mexican educated in Spain, but in all probability he was a Frenchman, Henri Martín Hispanicized under the form of Enrico Martín or Martínez. In 1607 the Viceroy Don Luis de Velasco entrusted to him the difficult task of draining the valley surrounding Mexico City. The valley formed a closed basin, and when the rains were heavy the Lakes of Zumpango and San Cristóbal rose higher than that of Texcoco and overflowed into the basin, inundating the city and threatening it with destruction. Martínez' plan was to open a canal as outlet to the Lake of Zumpango to prevent its overflow. The work began on 28 November 1607, and was terminated by 13 May 1609. Corrosion and the constant action of the water caused caving-in in the interior of the tunnel, and obstructed the passage to such an extent that, during the viceregency of Archbishop Fray García Guerra (1611–12), in reply to the inquiry made by Philip III for information concerning the utility of the work, the amount so far expended, and what would still be required to complete it, the archbishop and the municipal government replied that the work done by Martínez was not sufficient to place the city beyond the danger of inundations and that $413,325 had been expended and 1,126,650 workmen engaged in the work. Martínez wrote to the king contradicting this information.

The viceroy, Don Diego Fernández de Córdoba, Marques de Guadalcázar (1612–21), the successor of Fray García Guerra, was sent from Spain with special instructions concerning the work of the draining of the valley. At the same time Philip III commissioned the Spanish ambassador to the Court of France, Don Íñigo Contreras, to find a competent engineer for the work and the Dutchman Adrian Boot, who arrived in Mexico in 1614, was selected. At the suggestion of the viceroy, Boot with Martínez and the auditor Otalora visited the works and each made a report. Boot reported that Martínez' canal called Huehuetoca or Nochistongo was inadequate and presented plans for a new work which would cost $185,900; Martínez offered with 300 men and $100,000 to finish the work, and to moreover divert into the course of the canal the waters of the River Cuauhtitlan, which, when it rose, overflowed into the valley of Mexico. Boot's plan was rejected, and that presented by Martínez was accepted with the king's approval. The royal approbation was obtained 3 April 1616, and Martínez received his instructions to begin the work at once.

In 1623 when the work was still in an unfinished state the Viceroy the Marquis de Gelvez (1621–24) to test the utility of the canal directed the work to be suspended and the waters, including that of the River Cuauhtitlan, which was then discharging through the tunnel, to be once more diverted into the lakes of the valley. This caused a flood in 1627 and the municipal government petitioned the Viceroy Cerralvo (1624–35) to rectify the trouble and avert a disaster. The viceroy entrusted the matter to Boot, Martínez, and several others who had studied the situation, and all submitted reports. Between disputes and meetings the time up to 1629 was lost and the mouth of Martínez tunnel having become practically obstructed, the waters of the Cuauhtitlan overflowed into the Lake of Zumpango and Mexico City was placed in great peril.

The viceroy had Martínez arrested and imprisoned on the charge of having purposely closed the mouth of the tunnel, to which he replied that the lack of funds had prevented the repairs being made in the roof of the tunnel, and that the portions that had caved in had impeded the flow of the water. A few days later (21 September 1629) he was released and the work of repairing the tunnel put into his hands. It was, however, too late, as the following day a great flood occurred, water rising in the city proper to the height of two metres. The ravages of the water were terrible, the greater portion of the houses were rendered uninhabitable, and according to some historians 30,000 persons lost their lives. Some years later the auditor, Don Juan de Villabona Cubiaurre, was appointed chief superintendent of the work and submitted an unfavourable report on the work of Martínez. In 1789 the tunnel was converted into an open canal. At the turn of the twentieth Century an entirely new project was carried out by which the waters of the valley discharge through the Tequixquiac tunnel.

He died in New Spain in 1632.

== Published works ==
- Lunario y Regimiento de Salud (Mexico, 1604);
- Repertorio de tiempo e historia natural de Nueva Espana (Mexico, 1606);
- Agricultura de Nueva Espana sobre la cria de ganados, labores, huertas, jardines, etc.;
- De fisionomia de rostros;
- Discurso sobre la magna conjuncion de los planetas Jupiter y Saturno acaecida el 24 de Diciembre de 1603;
- Treinta y dos mapas de la costa del sur de Nueva Espana, de sus puertos, ensenadas, cabos, etc.;
- Tratado de Trigonometría (A lost publication.)
