= Melchor Ocampo, State of Mexico =

Melchor Ocampo
- Municipality and town
- Coat of arms

- Location in Mexico
- Coordinates: 19°42′30″N 99°8′40″W
- Country: Mexico
- State: Mexico (state)

Area
  - Total: 32.48 km^{2} (12.54 sq mi)

Population (2005)
  - Total: 37,706
- Time zone: UTC-6 (Central Standard Time)

Melchor Ocampo is a town and municipality in the State of Mexico, Mexico. The municipality covers an area of 32.48 km^{2}.

As of 2005, the municipality had a total population of 37,706.

== Name ==
From its founding until 1894, the municipality was known as Tlacomulco and then San Miguel Tlaxomulco; the latter portion comes from the Nahuatl words tlalli (earth); xomolli (corner or small place) and co of coztic (in), that is to say, "In some corner of the earth" or "a little corner of ground".

In 1894, the legislature of the State of Mexico decreed that the place would be called "Ocampo". Currently it is known as Melchor Ocampo in honor of the deceased reformist politician and philosopher of that name.

| Year | Event |
|---|---|
| 1435 | Return of the Xaltomecas and possible establishment of Tlacomulco. |
| 1821 | Establishment of the municipality of Tultepec, May 3. Included San Miguel, Visitación and Tenopalco, among others. |
| 1854 | Establishment of the municipality of San Miguel Tlaxomulco, October 24. Included Visitación and Tenopalco. |
| 1894 | Change name to Ocampo, October 12. |
| 1899 | Combined with Tultepec again. |
| 1917 | Melchor Ocampo established by act of the State Legislature of Mexico State, November 27. |

The symbol on the town flag (an "L" with the top ending in a fluer-de-lis, with a rectangle leaning against its inside) is intended to represent the Náhuatl form of the town's old name.

== History ==
While the general area between Cuautitlán, Zumpango and Tepotzotlán was probably under human influence from the Toltec period at the latest, and perhaps as early as 2500 B.C., there is no record of a settlement at the exact site of the current municipality until after the Spanish conquest. In 1519 the area was under the tlatoani of Cuautitlán ("Guautitlan" in contemporary records). In 1521 it came under Spanish rule, when Cortez's forces "occupied it without resistance".

After the conquest, the town of Cuautitlán and everything that pertained to it, including Tlaxomulco, was given as an encomienda to Alonso de Ávila, one of Cortez's captains.

== Culture ==
The most notable monument in the municipality is the principal church, dedicated to the Archangel Michael (San Miguel). It is built of black volcanic rock (tezontle) and has a façade in baroque style. It was built in the seventeenth century.

== Demography ==
=== Population history ===
| Year | Total | Indigenous | Births in Period | Deaths in Period | Comments |
|---|---|---|---|---|---|
| 2005 | 37706 | 290 | - | - | "II Conteo de Población y Vivienda" |
| 2000 | 37724 | - | - | - | General Census; 49% male |
| 1995 | 33456 | | | | |
| 1991–1995 | - | - | 750/year | 130/year | - |
| 1990 | 26154 | 372 | - | - | Of which: 154 otomí, 75 náhuatl, 36 mazateco. |
| 1980-1990 | - | - | 570/year | - | |
| 1980 | 17990 | | | | |
| 1930 | 4124 | - | - | - | Of which: 2254 in the Melchor Ocampo pueblo, 1016 in Visitación, 844 in Tenopalco |
