= Zumpango de Ocampo =

- Municipal Seat
- Location within State of Mexico
- Coordinates: 19°47′49″N 99°5′57″W
- Country: Mexico
- Municipality: Zumpango
- Elevation: 2,259 m (7,411 ft)

Population (2010)
  - Total: 50,742
- Time zone: UTC-6 (Central Standard Time)

Zumpango de Ocampo is a city and the municipal seat of municipality of Zumpango, State of Mexico. It is also the regional seat of the Zumpango Region, an administrative sub-division. It is currently an important urban center of the state and had a population of 50,742, according to the 2010 census.
