= Huehuetoca =

Town and municipality in State of Mexico, Mexico

- Town & Municipality
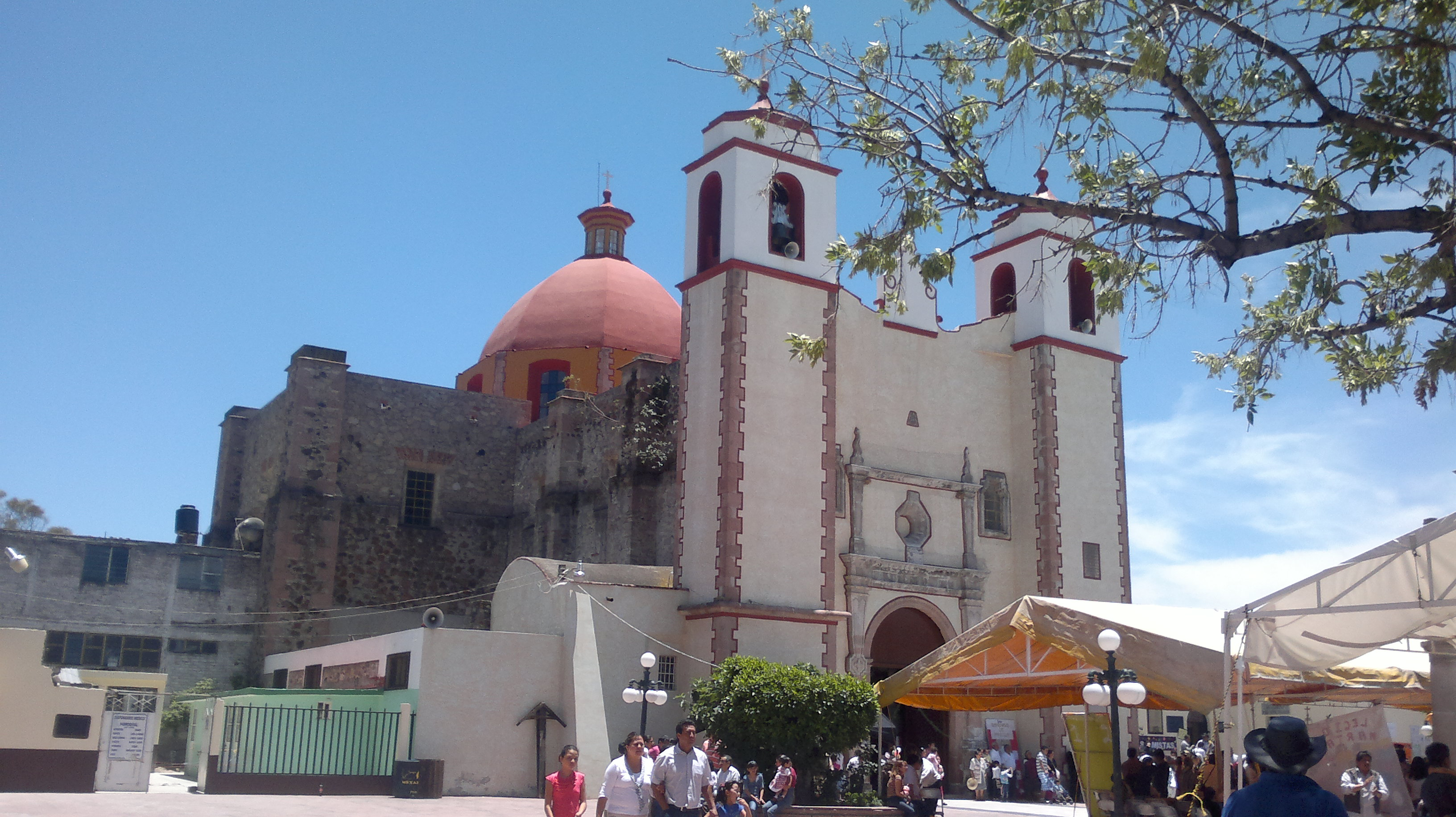
- Parish of San Pablo church in Huehuetoca.

- Coat of arms

- Location within State of Mexico Location within Mexico
- Coordinates: 19°50′03″N 99°12′12″W
- Country: Mexico
- State: State of Mexico

Government
  - Municipal President: Salvador Quezada Ortega (2006–2009)

Area
  - Municipality: 161.98 km^{2} (62.54 sq mi)
- Elevation (of seat): 2,250 m (7,380 ft)

Population (2005) Municipality
  - Municipality: 59,721
  - Seat: 11,427
- Time zone: UTC-6 (Central)
- Postal code (of seat): 54680
- Website: http://www.huehuetoca.gob.mx/

Huehuetoca (Otomi: Nbida) is a municipio (municipality) in State of Mexico, central Mexico, and also the name of its largest town and municipal seat.

== Name origins ==
The name "Huehuetoca" is derived from the Nahuatl huehuetocan, which has several interpretations. The reduplicated stem huēhue- carries the meaning "old" or "ancient", but the etymology of the remainder is debated. Some sources interpret tocan as “followed” or “language.”

== History ==
The town originated with the migration of a Chichimeca group led by Mixcóatl into the area around 528 CE. The settlement was conquered by a number of people. The original village of Huehuetocan was destroyed by the Otomi from Xaltocan. These Otomi were then vanquished by the Huexotzincas, the Tlaxcaltecas, the Totomihuacas from Totimehuacán (now near Puebla), and the Cuauhtinchantlaca from Cuautinchán. With each wave of conquest, the village became part of a larger political system. The last native people to control the village were the Tepanecas.

After the Conquest of México by the Spanish, Huehuetoca, along with Cuautitlán, Zumpango and Xaltocan were given to the conquistador Alonso de Avila as an encomienda, or as a sort of feudal territory. The area was evangelized by the Franciscans based in Cuautitlán, and it is thought that the first church was founded by Friar Pedro de Gante. By the mid-1500s, Huehuetoca and thirteen other nearby villages were managed by a secular authority, against the wishes of the local Indians.

At the beginning of the 1600s, Huehuetoca was chosen as the site of one of the first drainage projects for the Valley of Mexico. Beginning in 1607, engineer Enrico Martínez, persuaded the Spanish vice-regal authorities of the need to build a canal to drain and divert the waters of the Valley. The project initially attracted the attention of notable engineers, artists and political figures including the viceroy, Luis de Velasco II, himself. The complete project took around 200 years to complete.

In 1816, during the Mexican War of Independence, resident Pedro Saldirna was accused of heading a rebel group by the local priest. However, Saldirna was not prosecuted. Haciendas near the town were sacked during the Mexican Revolution by Zapatistas.

The Cuautitlán River crosses just north of the town and flows into the canal built for drainage of the Valley of Mexico. This river/canal is also called the Nochistongo, named after an old village that was located in what is now the State of Hidalgo.

The town was also a stop on the Mexico City - Nuevo Laredo rail line that was inaugurated in 1888 by the National Mexican Construction Company (Compañía Constructora Nacional Mexicana) and later run by the Mexican National Railroad Company (Compañía del Camino de Fierro Nacional Mexicana). This rail line was widened here between 1901 and 1903 to also serve as a link north for Toluca and other central-Mexico localities.

The town contains a number of historical sites including the Parish of San Pablo, dating from the 16th and 17th centuries, The Viceroy Luis de Velasco House, also known as the House of the Viceroys, from the 18th century. This house served as a residence for the viceroys when they came to visit and monitor the Nochistongo drainage project. Other sites include the Chapel of El Calvario, from the 19th and 20th centuries, the Bridge of El Calvario, from the 19th century, the Bridge of los Arcos del Acueducto, from the 19th century and Temple of San Miguel Jagüeyes, from the 18th century.

== Municipality ==
The municipality borders the municipalities of Tepotzotlán, Zumpango, Tequixquiac and Coyotepec of the State of Mexico. The State of Hidalgo borders to the northwest. It occupies a territory of 161.98 km^{2}. The territory contains a number of eroding volcanic cones, most of which belong to the Sierra de Guadalupe and the Sierra de Tepotzotlán. Significant elevations include Mount Cincoque, also known as Mount Huautecomaque (2,630 meters), the Cerro Grande Guaytepeque, also known as Cerro de la Estrella (2,700 meters), the Cerro de Ahumada, also known as the Mesa Grande, (2,580 meters) and the Cerro de Guaytepeque (2,250 meters). The area's main river is the Cuautitlán River. Because of the drainage project of the 17th century, this river now leads to the Tula River in Hidalgo, instead of the Valley of Mexico. The municipality contains two large dams to store wáter for agricultural use, 16 streams, most of which contain wáter only in the rainy season, and 15 ponds or small lakes. The two largest are called the San Miguel de los Jagüeyes and the Jagüey Prieto. The area has a rainy season during the months of June to October and a dry season from November to May. During the year, temperaturas range from 6.9 °C in the Winter and 23.8 °C in the summer, with an average of 15.4 °C.

The municipality is primarily agricultural, with fields dedicated to corn, alfalfa and vegetables. Sheep and goats are also raised here, with zebu being recently introduced.

The municipality is growing rapidly, mostly because it is located in the Mexico City Metropolitan Area. The operators of the Tren Suburbano, the commuter rail that connects the northern suburbs with Mexico City has expressed interest in building a branch that will lead to Huehuetoca. In late 2008, the housing developer ARA, announced plans to build 26,000 homes in the municipality over the next several years.

== Demography ==
=== Populated places in Huehuetoca ===
Town	Population
Total	
Huehuetoca	
San Miguel Jagüeyes	
San Bartolo	
Xalpa	
