= Coyotepec, State of Mexico =

Coyotepec
- Municipality
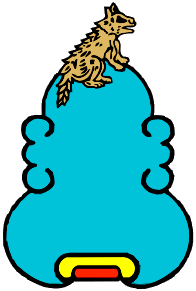
- Coat of arms

- Location within State of Mexico Location within Mexico
- Coordinates: 19°45′0″N 99°10′16″W
- Country: Mexico
- State: State of Mexico

Area
  - Total: 12.30 km^{2} (4.75 sq mi)

Population (2005)
  - Total: 39,341
- Time zone: UTC-6 (Central Standard Time)

Coyotepec is a municipality in the State of Mexico, Mexico. The municipality covers an area of 12.30 km^{2} and, in 2005, had a total population of 39,341.

The name comes from the Nahuatl coyotl (coyote) and tepetl (hill), with the locative suffix c: thus, "hill of the coyote" or "place of coyotes".
