= Valley of Mexico =

Highland plateau in central Mexico

Coordinates: 19°40′N 98°52′W

The Valley of Mexico at the time of the Spanish conquest in 1519

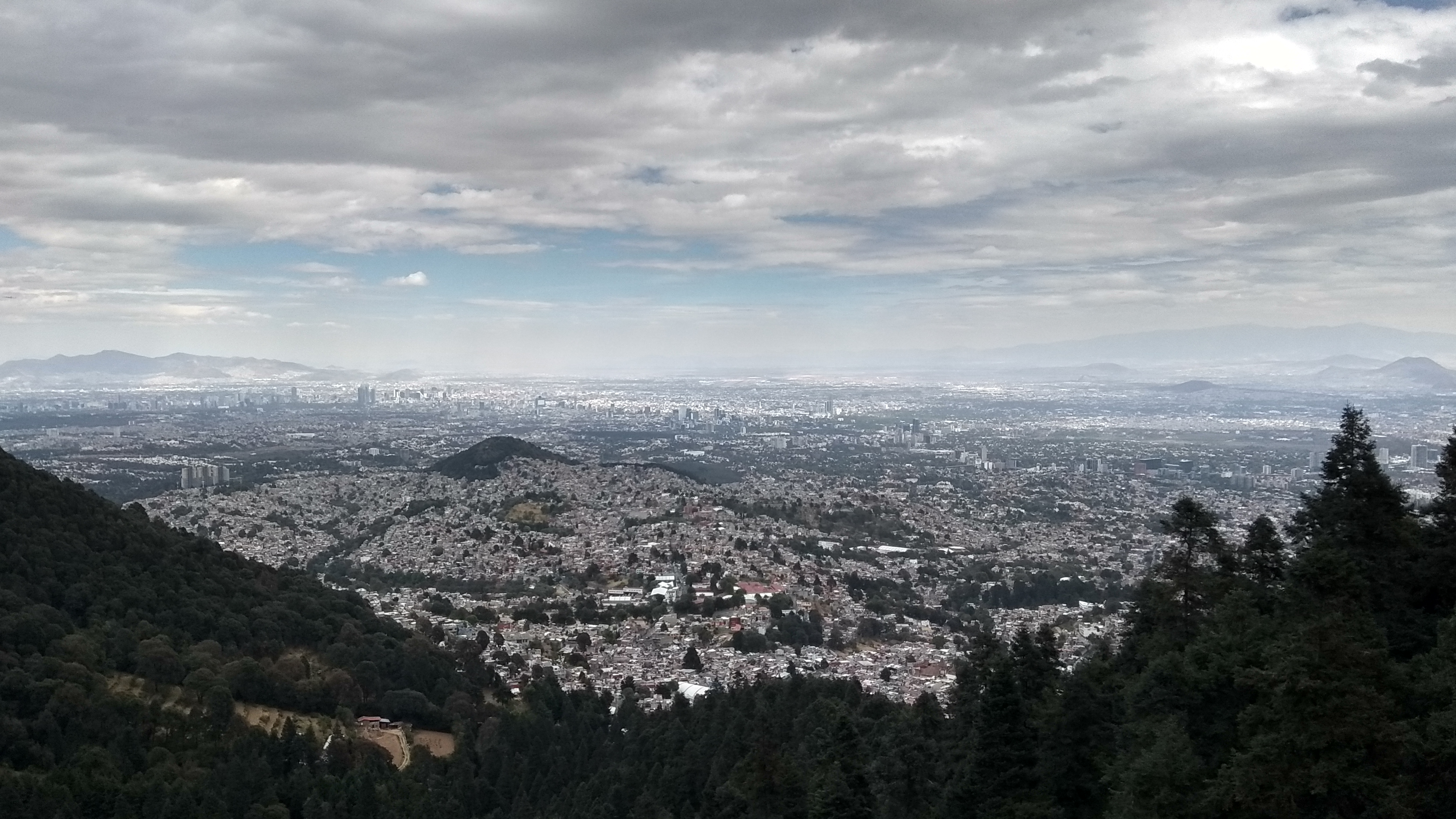
View of the Valley of Mexico from the neighborhood of San Bernabé Ocotepec, 2022

The Valley of Mexico (Spanish: Valle de México; Nahuatl languages: Anahuac, lit. 'Land Between the Waters'), sometimes also called the Basin of Mexico, is a large natural basin on the highland plateau of central Mexico. Surrounded by mountains and volcanoes, the valley was the historical center of several pre-Columbian civilizations including Teotihuacan, the Toltec, and the Aztec Empire, and today is almost entirely occupied by Mexico City, the capital of the modern nation of Mexico.

A natural endorheic basin, the Valley of Mexico historically contained five shallow, interconnected lakes called Lake Zumpango, Lake Xaltocan (Nahuatl languages: Xāltocān), Lake Xochimilco, Lake Chalco, and the largest, Lake Texcoco, which at their greatest extent together covered about 1,500 square kilometers (580 sq mi) of the valley floor. When Spanish explorers first arrived in the Valley of Mexico in 1519, it had one of the highest population concentrations in the world with about one million people. After the conquest of the Aztec Empire, the Spaniards rebuilt the largest and most dominant city, Mēxihco Tenōchtitlan, renaming it Ciudad de México (Mexico City) and over time began to drain the lakes' waters to control flooding. By the 20th century the lakes had almost entirely disappeared and the municipalities of Mexico City eventually grew to occupy the reclaimed land of the former lakebed.

The Valley of Mexico is located in the Trans-Mexican Volcanic Belt. The valley contains most of the Mexico City metropolitan area, as well as parts of the State of Mexico, Hidalgo, Tlaxcala, and Puebla. It is approximately 125 km (78 miles) long and 75 km (47 miles) wide with a NNE-SSW orientation, covering a total surface area of approximately 9,600 km^{2} (3,700 sq mi). The Valley of Mexico can be subdivided into four basins, but the largest and most studied is the area that contains Mexico City. This subsection of the larger valley in particular is often colloquially referred to as the "Valley of Mexico". The valley has a minimum elevation of 2,200 meters (7,200 ft) above sea level and is surrounded by mountains and volcanoes that reach elevations of over 5,000 meters (16,000 ft). It is an enclosed valley with no natural outlet for water to flow to the sea, although there is a gap to the north where there is a high mesa but no high mountain peaks. Within this vulnerable watershed all the native fishes were extinct by the end of the 20th century. Hydrologically, the valley has three features. The first feature is the lakebeds of five now-extinct lakes, which are located in the southernmost and largest of the four sub-basins. The other two features are the piedmont and the mountainsides that collect the precipitation that eventually flows to the lake area. These last two are found in all four of the sub-basins of the valley. Today, the Valley drains through a series of artificial canals to the Tula River, and eventually the Páruco River and the Gulf of Mexico. Seismic activity is frequent here, and the valley is an earthquake-prone zone.

The valley has been inhabited for at least 12,000 years, attracting humans with its mild climate (average temperatures between 12 and 15 °C, or 54 and 59 °F), abundant game, and ability to support large-scale agriculture. Civilizations that have arisen in this area include the Teotihuacan (800 BC to 800 AD), the Toltec Empire (10th to 13th century), and the Aztec Empire (1325 to 1521). Although violence and disease significantly lowered the population of the valley after the Spanish conquest, by 1900 it had again grown to over one million people. The 20th and 21st centuries have seen an explosion of population in the valley along with the growth of industry. Since 1900, the population has doubled every fifteen years. Today, around 21 million people live in the Mexico City metropolitan area, which extends throughout almost all of the valley into the states of Mexico and Hidalgo and is one of the most populous urban areas in the world.

The growth of a major urban industrial centre in an enclosed basin has created significant air and water quality issues for the valley. Wind patterns and thermal inversions trap airborne pollutants in the valley. Overextraction of groundwater has also caused new flooding problems for the city as it sinks below the historic lake floor. This causes stress on the valley's drainage system, requiring new tunnels and canals to be built.

== History of human habitation ==
=== First human habitation ===
The Valley of Mexico attracted prehistoric humans because the region was rich in biodiversity and had the capacity of growing substantial crops. Generally speaking, humans in Mesoamerica, including central Mexico, began to leave a hunter-gatherer existence in favor of agriculture sometime between the end of the Pleistocene epoch and the beginning of the Holocene. The oldest known human settlement in the Valley of Mexico is located in Tlapacoya, located on what was the edge of Lake Chalco in the southeast corner of the valley in contemporary Mexico State. There is reliable archeological evidence to suggest that the site dates as far back as 12,000 BC. After 10,000 BC, the number of artifacts found increases significantly. There are also other early sites such as those in Tepexpan, Los Reyes Acozac, San Bartolo Atepehuacan, Chimalhuacán and Los Reyes La Paz but they remain undated. Human remains and artifacts such as obsidian blades have been found at the Tlapacoya site that have been dated as far back as 20,000 BC, when the valley was semi-arid and contained species like camels, bison and horses that could be hunted by man. However, the precise dating of these artifacts has been disputed.

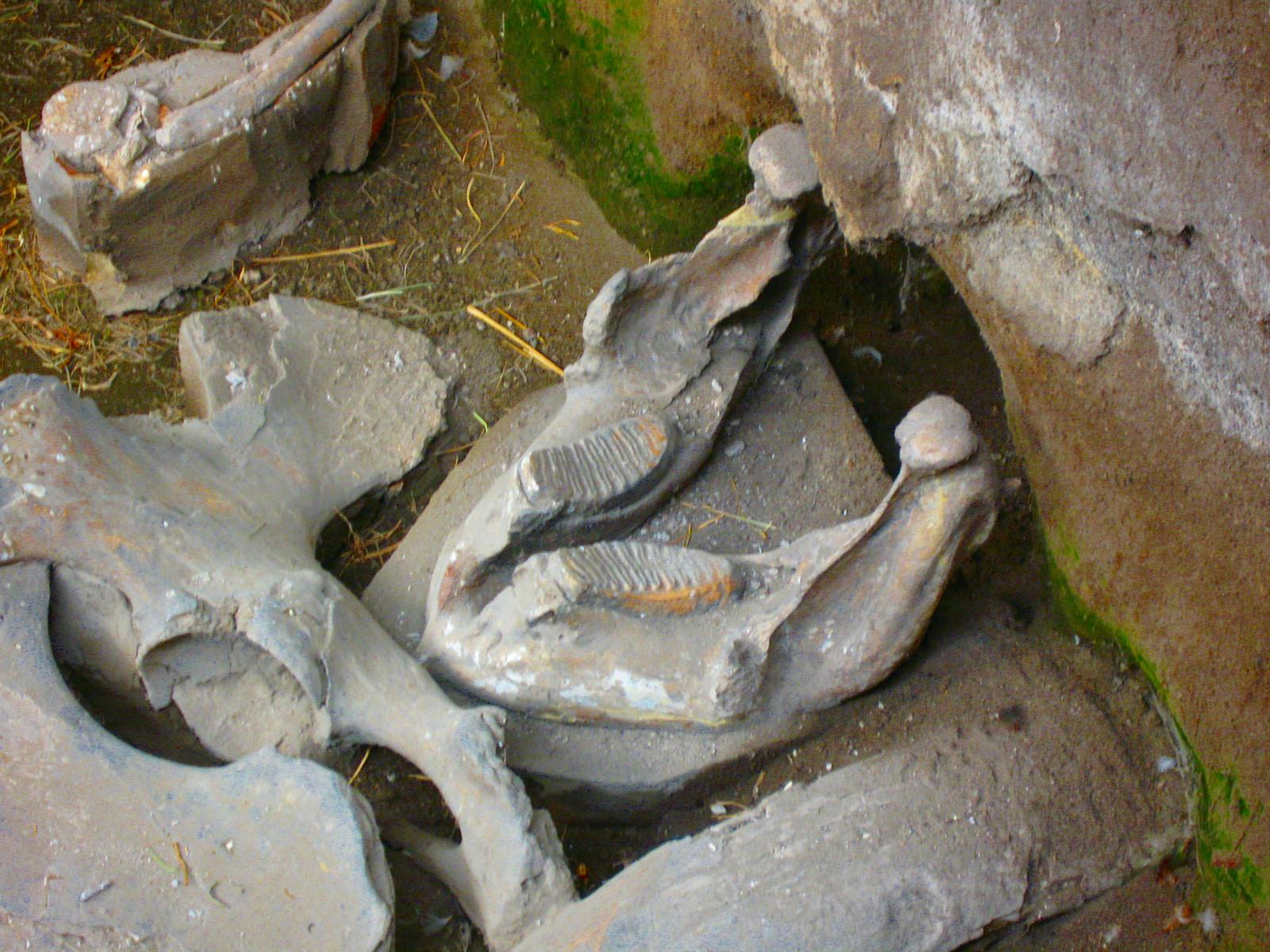
A Columbian mammoth jaw excavated at Tocuila

Giant Columbian mammoths once populated the area, and the valley contains the most extensive mammoth kill sites in Mexico. Most of the sites are located on what were the shores of Lake Texcoco in the north of the Federal District and the adjacent municipalities of Mexico State such as in Santa Isabel Ixtapan, Los Reyes Acozac, Tepexpan and Tlalnepantla. Mammoth bones are still occasionally found in farmland here. They have been discovered in many parts of the Federal District itself, particularly during the construction of the city's Metro lines and in the neighborhoods of Del Valle in the center, Lindavista to the center-north and Coyoacán in the south of the city. The symbol for Line 4's Talisman station of the Mexico City Metro is a mammoth, due to the fact that so many bones were uncovered during its construction. However, the richest site for mammoth remains in the valley is at the Paleontological Museum in Tocuila, a 45-hectare (110-acre) site located near the town of Texcoco in Mexico State. Although there is some evidence around the old lakeshores that the first populations here survived by hunting, gathering, and possibly by scavenging, evidence from this time period is scarce.

=== Pre-Teotihuacan ===
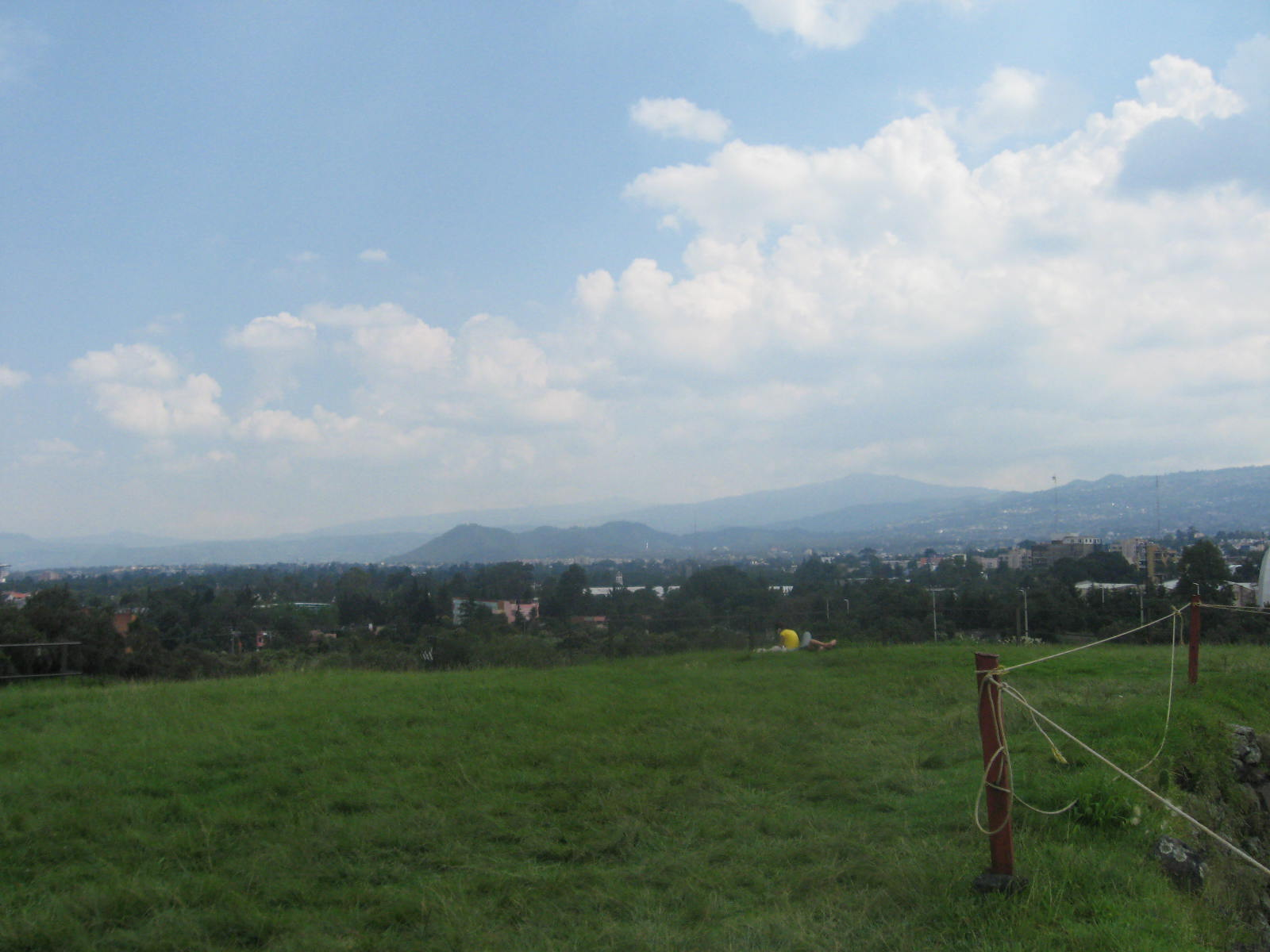
Modern-day Cuicuilco

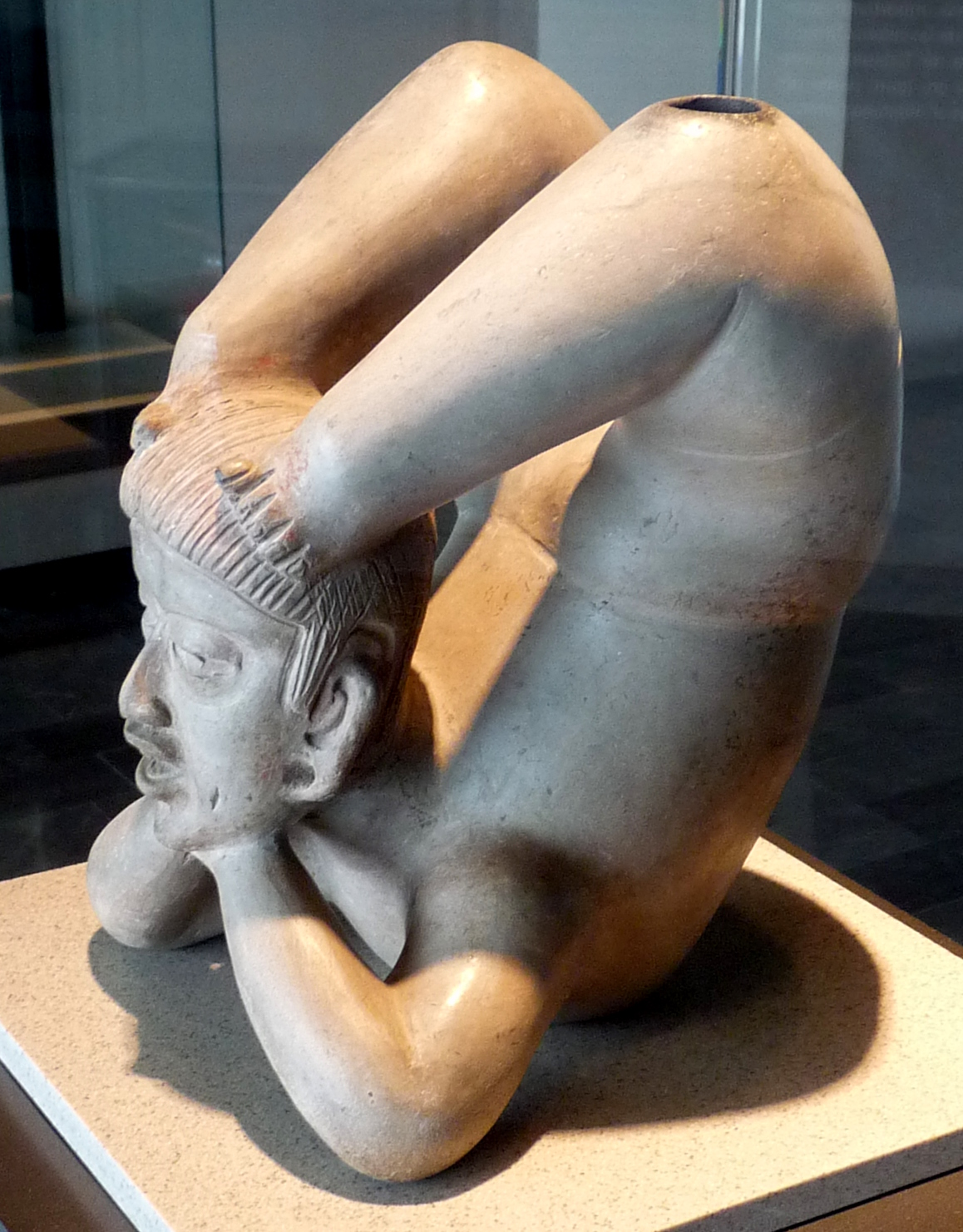
Ceramic art recovered from Tlatilco, c. 1300–800 BC

Tlatilco was a large pre-Columbian village and culture in the Valley of Mexico situated near the modern-day town of the same name in the Mexican Federal District. It was one of the first significant population centers to arise in the valley, flourishing on the western shore of Lake Texcoco during the Middle Pre-Classic period, between 1200 BC and 200 BC. It was originally classified as a necropolis when it was first excavated, but it was determined that the many burials there were under houses of which nothing remains. It was then classified as a major chiefdom center. The Tlatilcans were an agricultural people growing beans, amaranth, squash and chili peppers, reaching their peak from 1000 to 700 BC.

The next-oldest confirmed civilization is in the far south of the valley and is called Cuicuilco. This archaeological site is located where Avenida Insurgentes Sur crosses the Anillo Periférico in the Tlalpan borough of the city. The old settlement once extended far beyond the boundaries of the current site, but it is buried under lava from one of the volcanic eruptions that led to its demise, and much of the modern city is built over this lava. The settlement was located where an old river delta used to form in the valley with waters from Mount Zacatépetl located in what is now the Tlalpan Forest. Cuicuilco was believed to have reached city status by 1200 BC and began to decline around 100 BC - AD 150. However, even though the ceremonial pyramid was abandoned, the site remained a location to leave offerings up to AD 400, although lava from the nearby Xitle volcano completely covered it.

=== Teotihuacan and the Toltecs ===
Around 2,000 years ago, the Valley of Mexico became one of the world's most densely populated areas and has remained so since. After the decline of Cuicuilco, the population concentration shifted north, to the city of Teotihuacan and later to Tula, both outside the lake's region of the valley. Teotihuacan became an organized village around 800 BC but it was around 200 BC that it began to reach its height. When it did, the city had approximately 125,000 inhabitants and covered 20 square kilometers (8 sq mi) of territory. It was dedicated primarily to the obsidian trade and at its peak was an important religious center and pilgrimage for the valley. In the early 8th century, with the rise of the Toltec empire, Teotihuacan ceased to be a major urban centre and the population shifted to Tollan or Tula on the northern front of the Valley of Mexico.

=== Aztec Empire ===
After the end of the Toltec empire in the 13th century and the decline of the city of Tula, the population shifted once again, this time to the lakes region of the valley. With this migration came the concept of a city-state based on the Toltec model. By the end of the 13th century, some fifty small urban units, semi-autonomous and with their own religious centers, had sprung up around the lakeshores of the valley. These remained intact with a population of about 10,000 each under Aztec rule and survived into the colonial period. All of these city-states, including the largest and most powerful, Tenochtitlan, with more than 150,000 inhabitants, claimed descent from the Toltecs. None of these cities was completely autonomous or self-sufficient, resulting in a conflictive political situation, and a complex system of agriculture in the valley. These city-states had similar governmental structures based on the need to control flooding and store water for irrigating crops. Many of the institutions created by these hydraulic societies, such as the building and maintenance of chinampas, aqueducts and dikes, were later co-opted by the Spanish during the colonial period.

The largest and most dominant city at the time of the Spanish conquest was Tenochtitlan. It was founded by the Mexica (Aztecs) on a small island in the western part of Lake Texcoco in 1325, and was extended with the use of chinampas, human-made extensions of agricultural land into the southern lake system, to increase productive agricultural land, covering about 9,000 hectares (35 sq mi). The inhabitants controlled the lake with a sophisticated system of dikes, canals and sluices. Much of the surrounding land in the valley was terraced and farmed as well, with a network of aqueducts channeling fresh water from springs in the mountainsides into the city itself. Despite being the dominant power, the need to rely on resources from other parts of the valley led to the Aztec Triple Alliance between Tenochtitlan, Texcoco and Tlacopan at the beginning of the empire. However, by the time the Spanish arrived in 1519, Tenochtitlan had become the dominant power of the three, causing grievances that the Spaniards were able to exploit. However, despite Tenochtitlan's power outside the valley, it never completely controlled all of the valley itself, with the altepetl of Tlaxcala the most prominent example.

By 1520, the estimated population of the valley was over 1,000,000 people.

A clickable map of the Metropolitan Area of the Valley of Mexico detailing the locations of various pre-Columbian archaeological sites.

=== Spanish colonial rule and the Mexico City metropolitan area ===
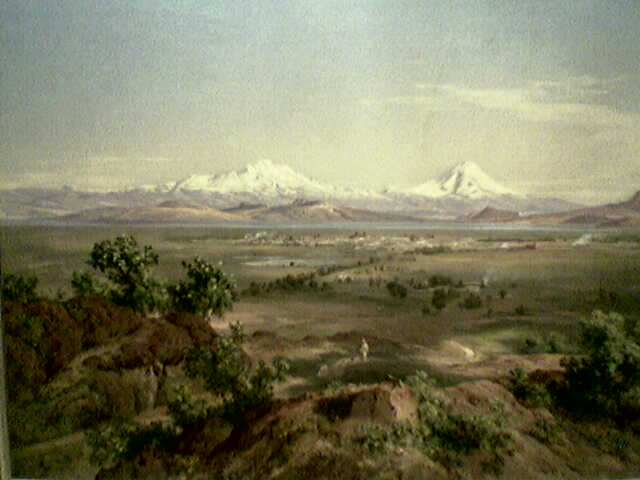
The Valley of Mexico, a 19th-century painting of the Valley of Mexico by José María Velasco Gómez.

After the Spanish conquest of the Aztec Empire in 1521, the Spanish rebuilt and renamed Tenochtitlan as Mexico City. They started with essentially the same size and layout as the Aztec city but as the centuries progressed, the city grew as the lakes shrank. Just after the conquest, disease and violence had decreased the population in the valley, especially of the native peoples, but after that, the population grew all through the colonial period and in the century after independence.

By the early 20th century, the population of Mexico City alone had risen to over one million people. A population explosion began early in the 20th century, with the population of the city itself doubling approximately every 15 years since 1900, partly attributed to the fact that the federal government has favored development of the metropolitan area over other areas of the country. This has spurred investment in infrastructure for the city, such as electricity, other power sources, water supply and drainage. These have attracted businesses which in turn have attracted more population. Since the 1950s, urbanization has spread out from beyond the bounds of the Federal District to the surrounding jurisdictions, especially to the north into the State of Mexico making for the Mexico City Metropolitan area, which fills most of the valley. Today, this metropolitan area accounts for 45 per cent of the country's industrial activity, 38 percent of GNP, and 25 percent of the population. Much of its industry is concentrated in the northern part of the Federal District and the adjoining cities in the state of Mexico. While population growth has slowed and even declined in the city proper, the outer limits of the metropolitan area keep growing. Much of this growth has occurred on the mountainsides of the valley, in the form of illegal settlements in ecologically sensitive areas. Overall urban settlement in the valley has expanded from about 90 km^{2} (35 sq mi) in 1940 to 1,160 km^{2} (450 sq mi) in 1990. The metropolitan area has about 21 million residents and about 6 million cars.

=== Air pollution ===
Mexico City is vulnerable to severe air pollution problems due to its altitude, its being surrounded by mountains and the winds patterns of the area. The altitude, with its low oxygen levels, makes for poor combustion of fossil fuels leading to unsafe levels of nitrogen oxides, hydrocarbons, and carbon monoxide. The valley is surrounded by mountain ranges with one small opening to the north. The surrounding mountains and climate patterns here make it difficult to clear out the smog produced. The valley has internal wind patterns which circulate around the valley without a prevailing wind to push contaminants in a single direction. The most significant climatic phenomena here is "thermal inversion," which is prevalent in the winter months when the cooler air of the valley is trapped by relatively warmer air above. Adding to this is that prevailing winds outside the valley move from north to south, in through the Valley's one opening, where incidentally most of the region's industry is located. These factors diminish in the summer and the situation is helped by the arrival of the rainy season, but the valley's southern latitude and the abundance of sunlight allows for dangerous levels of ozone and other dangerous compounds.

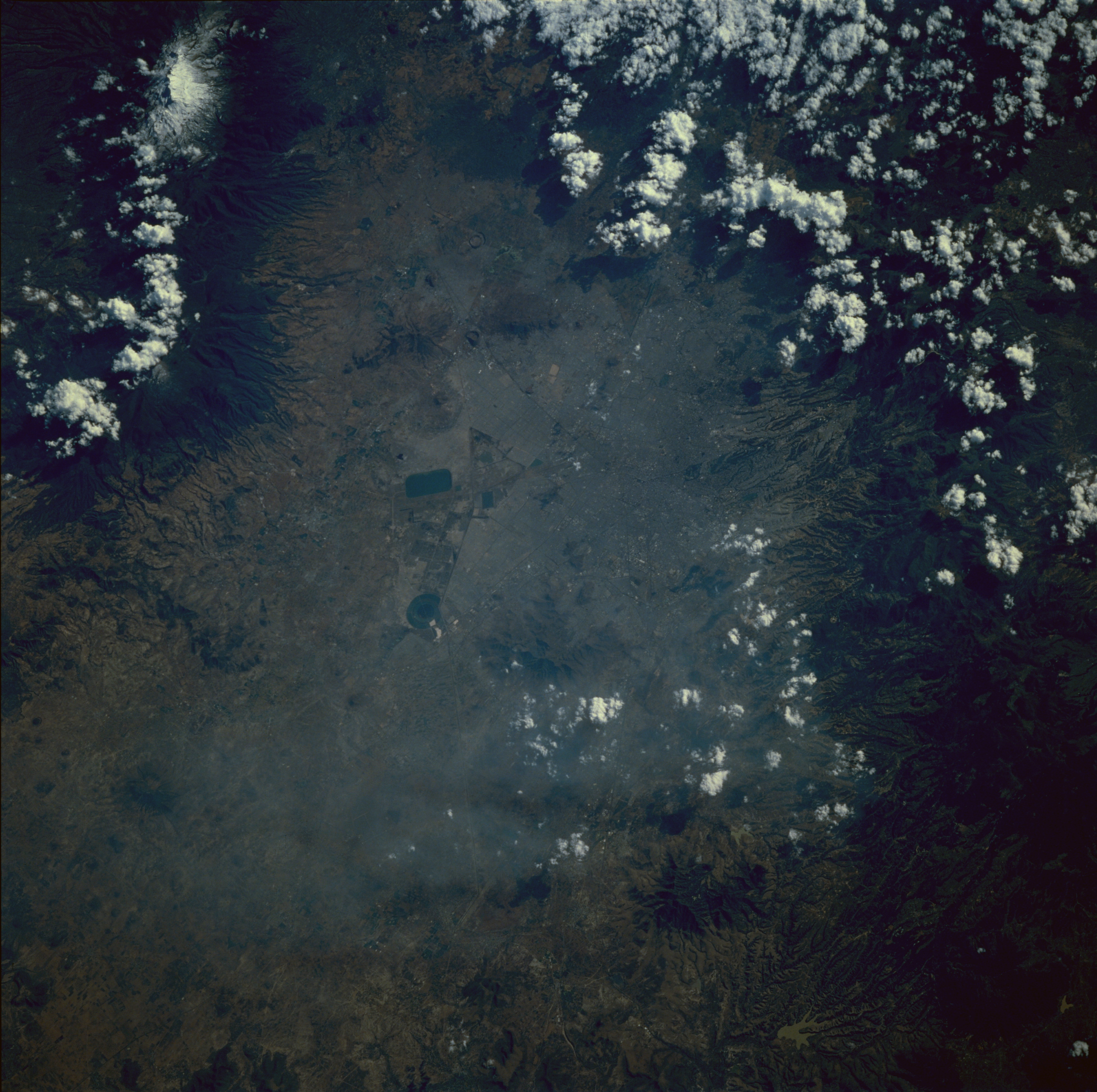
A NASA satellite image of smog in the Valley of Mexico in November 1985

While still considered one of the most polluted places on the planet, the valley's air pollution problems are not as bad as they were several decades ago. One major problem that was brought under control was the lead contamination in the air with the introduction of unleaded gasoline. Two other contaminants that have been brought under control are carbon monoxide and sulfur dioxide. The contamination problems that remain are primarily with ozone and fine particles (soot) (between 2.5 micrometers and 10 micrometers). Thirty to fifty percent of the time, Mexico City's levels of fine particles of ten micrometers, the most dangerous, exceed levels recommended by the World Health Organization. In the 1940s, before large-scale burning of fossil fuels in the area, the visibility of the valley was about 100 km (60 mi), allowing for daily viewing of the mountain ranges that surround the valley, including the snow-capped volcanoes of Popocatepetl and Iztaccihuatl. Since that time, the average visibility has come down to about 1.5 km (5,000 ft). Mountain peaks are now rarely visible from the city itself. While reduced visibility in the valley was due to sulfur emissions in the past, it is now due to fine particles in the air.

The effects on humans living in an enclosed, contaminated environment have been documented, especially by Nobel Prize winner Dr Mario J. Molina. He claims fine particle pollution is the greatest concern because of lung damage. According to him, the city's residents lose about 2.5 million working days every year due to health problems associated with fine particles.

== Hydrology ==
The Valley of Mexico is a closed or endorheic basin which geologically divides into three hydrologic zones, the low plain, which is essentially the bed of now-extinct lakes, the piedmont area and the surrounding mountains. The old lakebeds correspond to the lowest elevations of the valley in the south are mostly clay with a high water content and are almost entirely covered by urban development. In the piedmont area, these clays become mixed with silts and sands, and in some areas close to the mountains, the piedmont is largely composed of basalt from old lava flows. The valley is enclosed completely by mountain ranges, from which flow rain and melting snow into the valley's hydraulic system. This groundwater flow produces a number of springs in the foothills and upwellings in the valley floor. This underground flow is the source of the five aquifers that provide much of the drinking water to Mexico City located in Soltepec, Apan, Texcoco, Chalco-Amecameca and underneath Mexico City itself.

=== Old lake system ===
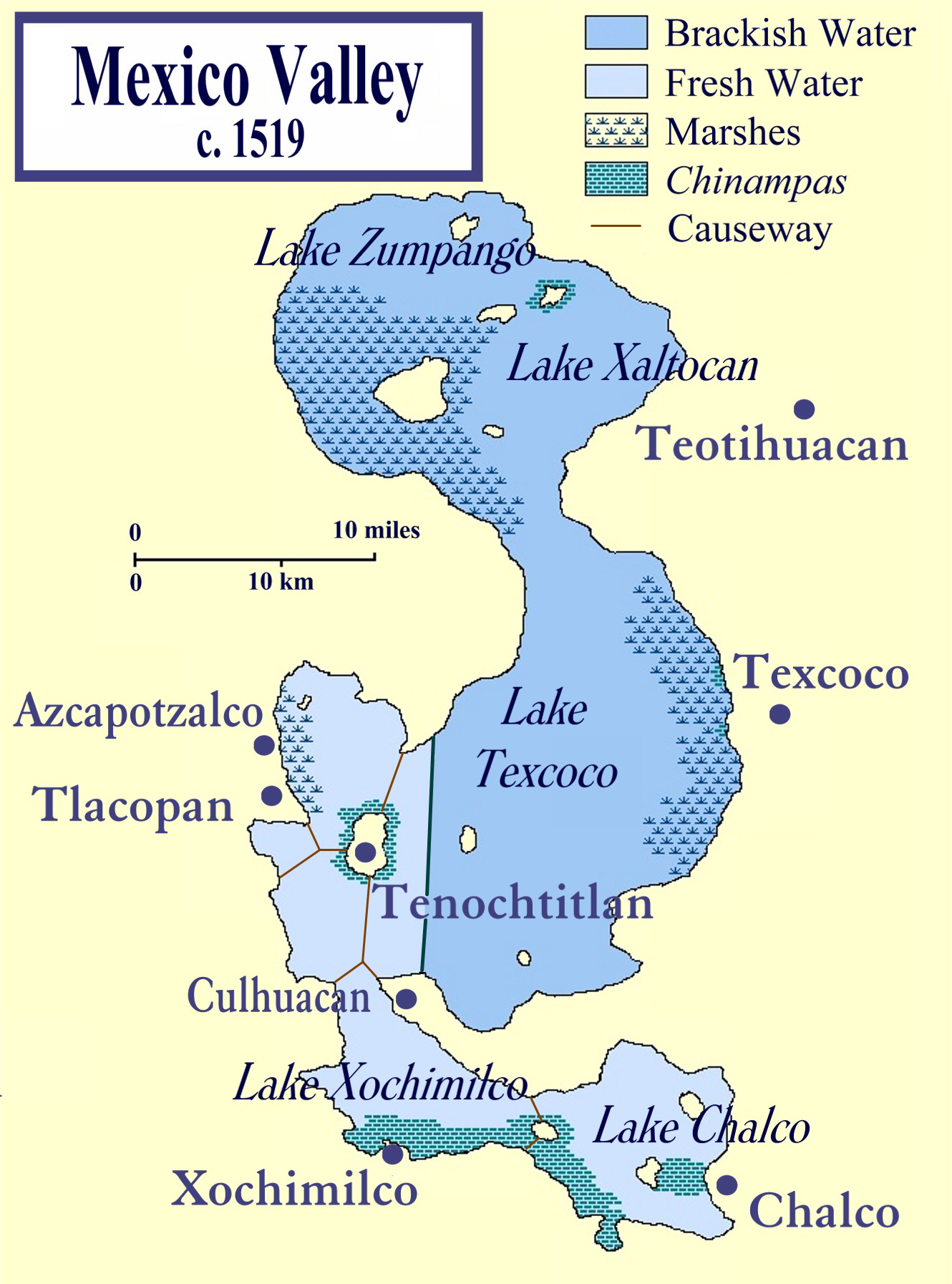
The lake system within the Valley of Mexico at the time of the Spanish Conquest in around 1519.

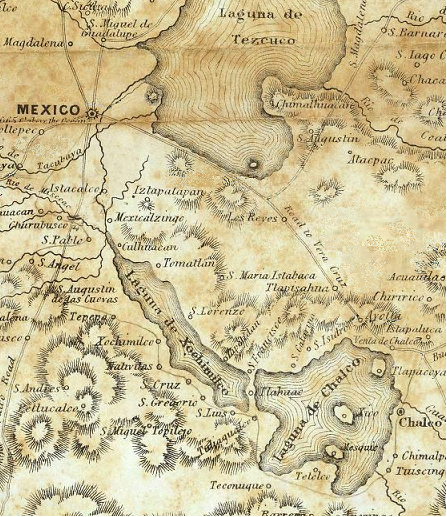
An 1847 map of Lake Xochimilco and Lake Chalco

Before the 20th century, the Mexico City portion of the valley contained a series of lakes, with saline lakes to the north near the town of Texcoco and freshwater ones to the south. The five lakes, Zumpango, Xaltoca, Xochimilco, Chalco, and the largest, Texcoco used to cover about 1,500 km^{2} (580 sq mi) of the basin floor. Small mountains such as the Sierra de Guadalupe and Mount Chiconaultla partially separated the lakes from each other. All the other lakes flowed toward the lower Lake Texcoco, which was saline due to evaporation. The lakes were fed by a number of rivers such as the San Joaquin, San Antonio Abad, Tacubaya, Becerra, Mixcoac and Magdalena Contreras, carrying runoff and snowmelt from the mountains.

Long before the arrival of the Spanish, the lake system had been shrinking due to climate change. Warmer temperatures had increased evaporation and reduced rainfall in the area so that the lakes’ waters were shallow at about five meters (16 feet) deep as early as the Tlapacoya culture, around 10,000 BC. During the Aztec Empire, the northern lakes were inaccessible by canoe during the dry season from October to May.

=== History of water control in the valley ===
For 2000 years, humans have been interfering with and altering the hydraulic conditions of the valley, especially in the lakes region. The Aztecs built dikes for flood control and to separate the saline water of the northern lakes from the fresh water of the southern ones. After the destruction of Tenochtitlan in 1521, the Spaniards rebuilt the Aztec dikes but found they did not offer enough flood protection.

The arrival of the Spanish and subsequent efforts to drain the area for flood control was a major infrastructure project, called the desagüe, which was pursued throughout the entire colonial period.

The idea of opening drainage canals first came about after a flood of the colonial city in 1555. The first canal was begun in 1605 to drain the waters of Lake Zumpango north through Huehuetoca which would also divert waters from the Cuautitlán River away from the lakes and toward the Tula River. This project was undertaken by Enrico Martínez and he devoted 25 years of his life to it. He did succeed in building a canal in this area, calling it Nochistongo, leading waters to the Tula Valley, but the drainage was not sufficient to avoid the Great Flood of 1629 in the city. Another canal, which would be dubbed the "Grand Canal" was built parallel to the Nochistongo one ending in Tequixquiac. The Grand Canal consists of one main canal, which measures 6.5 meters (21 ft) in diameter and 50 km (30 mi) long. The drainage project was continued after independence, with three secondary canals, built between 1856 and 1867. During the presidency of Porfirio Díaz (r. 1876–1911) drainage again became a priority. Díaz completed it officially in 1894, although work continued thereafter. Despite the Grand Canal's drainage capacity, it did not solve the problem of flooding in the city.

From the beginning of the 20th century, Mexico City began to sink rapidly and pumps needed to be installed in the Grand Canal, which before had drained the valley purely with gravity. Along with the pumps, the Grand Canal was expanded with a new tunnel through the low mountains called the Xalpa to take the canal past Tequisquiac. Even so, the city still suffered floods in 1950 and 1951. Despite its age, the Grand Canal can still carry 2,400,000 US gallons per minute (150 m^{3}/s) out of the valley, but this is significantly less than what it could carry as late as 1975 because continued sinking of the city (as much as 7 metres or 23 feet) weakens the system of water collectors and pumps.

As a result, another tunnel, called the Emisor Central, was built to carry wastewater. Although it is considered the most important pipe in the country, it has been damaged by overuse and wall corrosion of the 20 ft (6 m) diameter pipe. Because of lack of maintenance and gradual decrease in this tunnel's ability to carry water, there is concern that this tunnel will soon fail. It is continuously filled with water, making it impossible to inspect it for problems. If it fails, it would most likely be during the rainy season when it carries the most water, which would cause extensive flooding in the historic center, the airport and the boroughs on the east side.

Because of this, another new drainage project is planned that will cost US$1.3 billion. The project includes new pumping stations, a new 30-mile (50 km) drainage tunnel and repairs to the current 7,400-mile (11,900 km) system of pipes and tunnels to clear blockages and patch leaks.

Over-pumping of groundwater in the 20th century has hastened the disappearance of the lakes. The old lake beds are almost all paved except for some canals preserved in Xochimilco, mostly for the benefit of visitors who tour them on brightly painted trajineras, boats similar to gondolas.

Desiccation has had a major environmental impact on the Valley of Mexico.

=== Drinking water and sinking lands ===
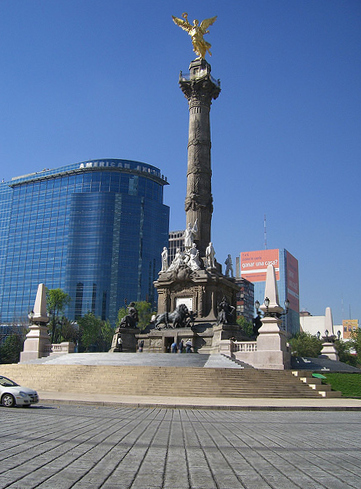
The Independence Angel statue: street level has sunk below the bottom of the statue.

Historically, Mexico City's potable water supply came via aqueduct from the mountain springs on the valley sides like that in Chapultepec as most of the water in Lake Texcoco was saline. These were originally built by the Aztecs and were rebuilt by the Spaniards. In the mid-1850s, potable groundwater was found underneath the city itself, which motivated the large-scale drilling of wells. Today, 70% of Mexico City's water still comes from five principal aquifers in the valley. These aquifers are fed by water from natural springs and runoff from precipitation.

It was only when the population reached about six million that Mexico City started to need to appropriate water from outside the valley. Today, Mexico City faces a serious water deficit. Because of increased demand from a growing population, increasing industry, and ecosystem degradation in the form of deforestation of the surrounding mountains, more water is leaving the system than is entering. It is estimated that 63 cubic meters per second (1,000,000 US gal/min) of water is needed to support the potable and agricultural irrigation needs of Mexico City's population. The main aquifer is being pumped at a rate of 55.5 m^{3}/s (880,000 US gal/min), but is only being replaced at 28 m^{3}/s (440,000 US gal/min), or about half of the extraction rate, leaving a shortfall of 27.5 m^{3}/s (436,000 US gal/min). This over-extraction of groundwater from the old clay lake bed has been causing the land upon which the city rests to collapse and sink. This problem began in the early 20th century as a consequence of the drainage of the valley for flood control. Since the beginning of the 20th century, some areas of Mexico City have sunk nine meters (30 feet). In 1900, the bottom of the lake was three meters (9.8 feet) lower than the median level of the city center. By 1974, the lake bottom was two meters (6.6 feet) higher than the city. The first signs of dropping ground water levels was the drying up of natural springs in the 1930s, which coincides with the beginning of intensive exploitation of the aquifer system through wells between 100 and 200 meters (330 and 660 ft) deep. Today, Mexico City is sinking between five and forty centimeters (0.2 and 1.3 ft) per year, and its effects are visible. El Ángel de la Independencia ("The Angel of Independence") statue, located on Paseo de la Reforma was built in 1910, anchored by a foundation deep beneath what was the surface of the street at that time. However, because the street has sunk around it, steps have been added to allow access to the statue's base.

Subsidence of the valley floor beneath has caused flooding problems as now much of the city has sunk below the natural lake floor. Currently, pumps need to work 24 hours a day all year round to keep control of runoff and wastewater. Despite this, flooding is still common, especially in the summer rainy season, in lower-lying neighborhoods such as Iztapalapa, forcing residents to build miniature dikes in front of their houses to prevent heavily polluted rainwater from entering their homes. Subsidence also causes damage to water and sewer lines, leaving the water distribution system vulnerable to contamination which carries risks to public health. Measures other than drainage have been implemented to contain flooding in the city. In 1950, dikes were built to confine storm runoff. Rivers that run through the city were encapsulated in 1950 and 1951. Rivers such as the Consulado River, Churubusco River and the Remedio River are encased in concrete tunnels which take their waters directly to the drainage system to leave the Valley. Two other rivers, the San Javier and the Tlalnepantla, which used to feed the old lake system, are diverted before they reach the city and their waters now flow directly into the Grand Canal. No water from these rivers is allowed to sink into the ground to recharge the aquifer. While the rivers and streams that flow down from the mountain peaks still begin the way they always have, their passage through the shantytowns lacking city sanitation schemes that surround Mexico City turns them into open combined sewers. Therefore, their final stages are frequently culverted or added to the existing major culverted rivers to keep this water from contaminating the aquifer.

== See also ==
- Mexican Plateau
- Trans-Mexican Volcanic Belt
- Valleys of Mexico
