= Gymnolaena =

Scientific classification
- Kingdom: Plantae
- Clade: Embryophytes
- Clade: Tracheophytes
- Clade: Angiosperms
- Clade: Eudicots
- Clade: Asterids
- Order: Asterales
- Family: Asteraceae
- Subfamily: Asteroideae
- Tribe: Tageteae
- Subtribe: Pectidinae
- Genus: Gymnolaena (DC.) Rydb.

Type species
- Dyssodia serratifolia DC.

Synonyms
- Dyssodia sect. Gymnolaena DC.

Genus of flowering plants

Gymnolaena is a genus of Mexican flowering plants in the family Asteraceae.

Species

- Gymnolaena chiapasana Strother - Chiapas
- Gymnolaena oaxacana (Greenm.) Rydb. - Oaxaca, Puebla
- Gymnolaena serratifolia (DC.) Rydb. - Oaxaca

formerly included

- Gymnolaena integrifolia (A.Gray) Rydb., Synonym of Comaclinium montanum (Benth.) Strother
- Gymnolaena seleri (B.L.Rob. & Greenm.) Rydb., Synonym of Boeberoides grandiflora (DC.) Strother
