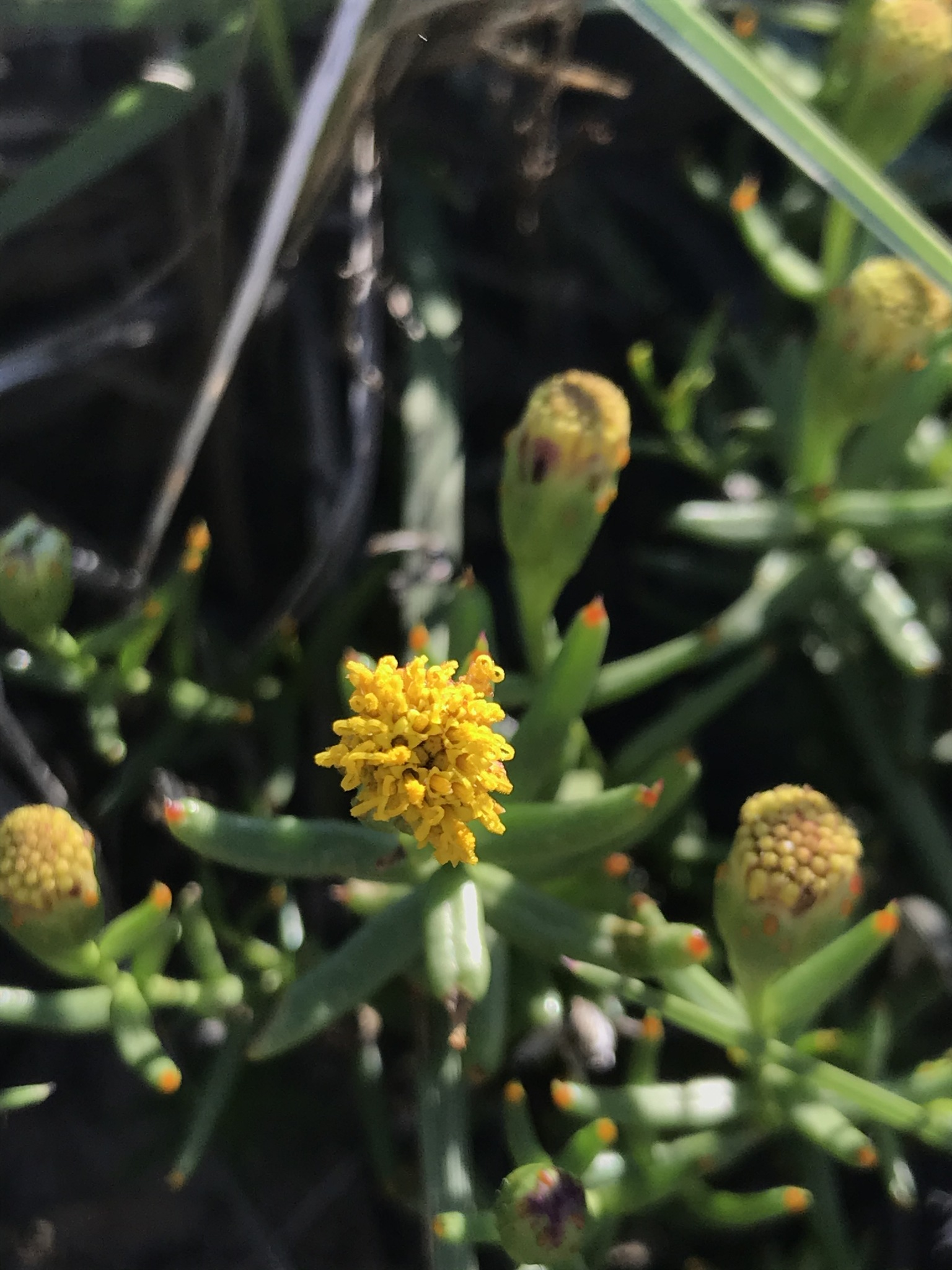
- B. californica

Scientific classification
- Kingdom: Plantae
- Clade: Tracheophytes
- Clade: Angiosperms
- Clade: Eudicots
- Clade: Asterids
- Order: Asterales
- Family: Asteraceae
- Subfamily: Asteroideae
- Tribe: Tageteae
- Subtribe: Pectidinae
- Genus: Bajacalia; Loockerman, et al.

Species
- 3, see text
- Bajacalia range

= Bajacalia =

Genus of flowering plants

Bajacalia is a genus of three flowering plants in the family Asteraceae. The genus was erected in 2003 to house two species moved from genus Porophyllum, now named Bajacalia tridentata and B. crassifolia. The third was newly described at the time and named Bajacalia moranii. These plants are near-endemic to the Baja California peninsula in Mexico (States of Baja California and Baja California Sur); one species (B. crassifolia) also has been found on Tiburón Island, part of Sonora. They have succulent leaves and yellow flowers.
