= Leucactinia =

Scientific classification
- Kingdom: Plantae
- Clade: Tracheophytes
- Clade: Angiosperms
- Clade: Eudicots
- Clade: Asterids
- Order: Asterales
- Family: Asteraceae
- Subfamily: Asteroideae
- Tribe: Tageteae
- Subtribe: Pectidinae
- Genus: Leucactinia; Rydb.
- Species: L. bracteata

Binomial name
- Leucactinia bracteata (S.Wats.) Rydb.

Synonyms
- Pectis bracteata S.Wats.; Dyssodia bracteata (S.Wats.) S.F.Blake

Genus of flowering plants

Leucactinia is a genus of flowering plants in the tribe Tageteae within the family Asteraceae.

Species

There is only one known species, Leucactinia bracteata, native to the State of Coahuila in northern Mexico.
