= Boeberastrum =

Scientific classification
- Kingdom: Plantae
- Clade: Embryophytes
- Clade: Tracheophytes
- Clade: Angiosperms
- Clade: Eudicots
- Clade: Asterids
- Order: Asterales
- Family: Asteraceae
- Subfamily: Asteroideae
- Tribe: Tageteae
- Subtribe: Pectidinae
- Genus: Boeberastrum (A.Gray) Rydb.

Synonyms
- Dyssodia sect. Boeberastrum A.Gray

Genus of flowering plants

Boeberastrum is a genus of flowering plants in the family Asteraceae.

Species

There are two accepted species, both endemic to the State of Baja California Sur in Mexico.

- Boeberastrum anthemidifolium (Benth.) Rydb.
- Boeberastrum litorale (Brandegee) Rydb. (often misspelled Boeberastrum littoralis)

formerly included

Boeberastrum concinnum (A.Gray) Rydb., Synonym of Thymophylla concinna (A.Gray) Strother
