= Rubus philyrophyllus =

Scientific classification
- Kingdom: Plantae
- Clade: Tracheophytes
- Clade: Angiosperms
- Clade: Eudicots
- Clade: Rosids
- Order: Rosales
- Family: Rosaceae
- Genus: Rubus
- Species: R. philyrophyllus

Binomial name
- Rubus philyrophyllus Rydb. 1913

Synonyms
- Rubus tiliaceus Liebm. 1853 not Sm. 1819; Rubus tiliaefolius Focke 1874 not Weihe ex Spreng. 1825 nor J.Harmand 1890; Rubus tiliifolius Focke 1874 not Weihe ex Spreng. 1825 nor J.Harmand 1890

Species of fruit and plant

Rubus philyrophyllus is an uncommon Mexican species of brambles in the rose family. It has been found only in the States of Puebla and Oaxaca in Mexico.

Rubus philyrophyllus is a perennial shrub with straight prickles and many hairs. Leaves are compound with 3 leaflets.
