= Rubus tuerckheimii =

Scientific classification
- Kingdom: Plantae
- Clade: Tracheophytes
- Clade: Angiosperms
- Clade: Eudicots
- Clade: Rosids
- Order: Rosales
- Family: Rosaceae
- Genus: Rubus
- Species: R. tuerckheimii

Binomial name
- Rubus tuerckheimii Rydb.

Species of fruit and plant

Rubus tuerckheimii is an uncommon Central American species of brambles in the rose family. It has been found only in Guatemala.

Rubus tuerckheimii is a perennial with curved prickles, reclining on walls, rocks, or other vegetation. Leaves are compound with 3 leaflets.
