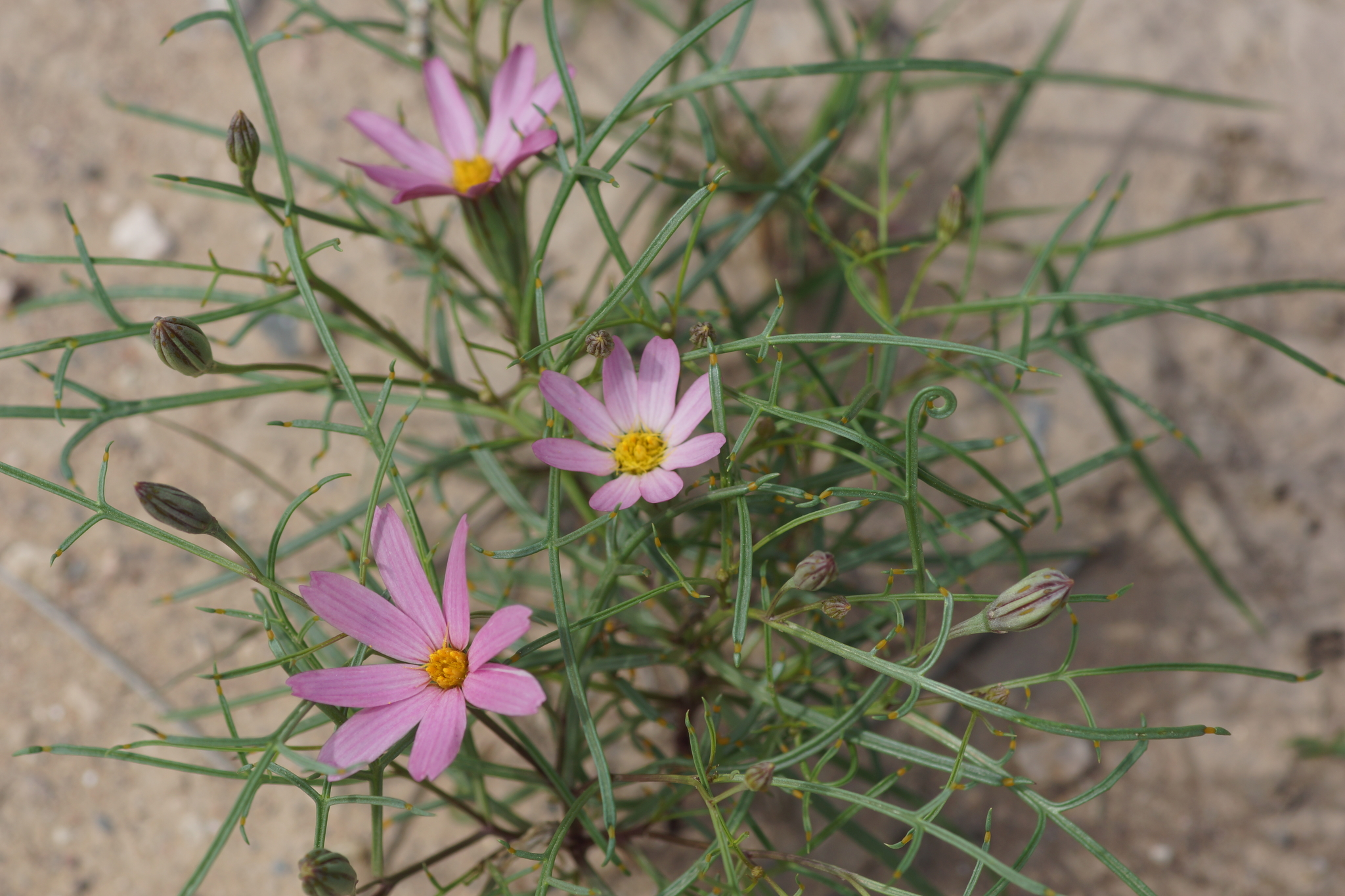

Scientific classification
- Kingdom: Plantae
- Clade: Tracheophytes
- Clade: Angiosperms
- Clade: Eudicots
- Clade: Asterids
- Order: Asterales
- Family: Asteraceae
- Genus: Nicolletia
- Species: N. edwardsii

Binomial name
- Nicolletia edwardsii A.Gray

= Nicolletia edwardsii =

Species of flowering plant

Nicolletia edwardsii, known as Edwards' hole-in-the-sand plant, is a species of flowering plant in the tribe Tageteae in the family Asteraceae.

The species is native to western New Mexico, Texas, Chihuahua, Coahuila, Durango, Zacatecas.
