= Clappia =

Clappia is the scientific name of two genera of organisms and may refer to:

- Clappia (gastropod), a genus of snails in the family Lithoglyphidae
- Clappia (plant), a genus of plants in the family Asteraceae
