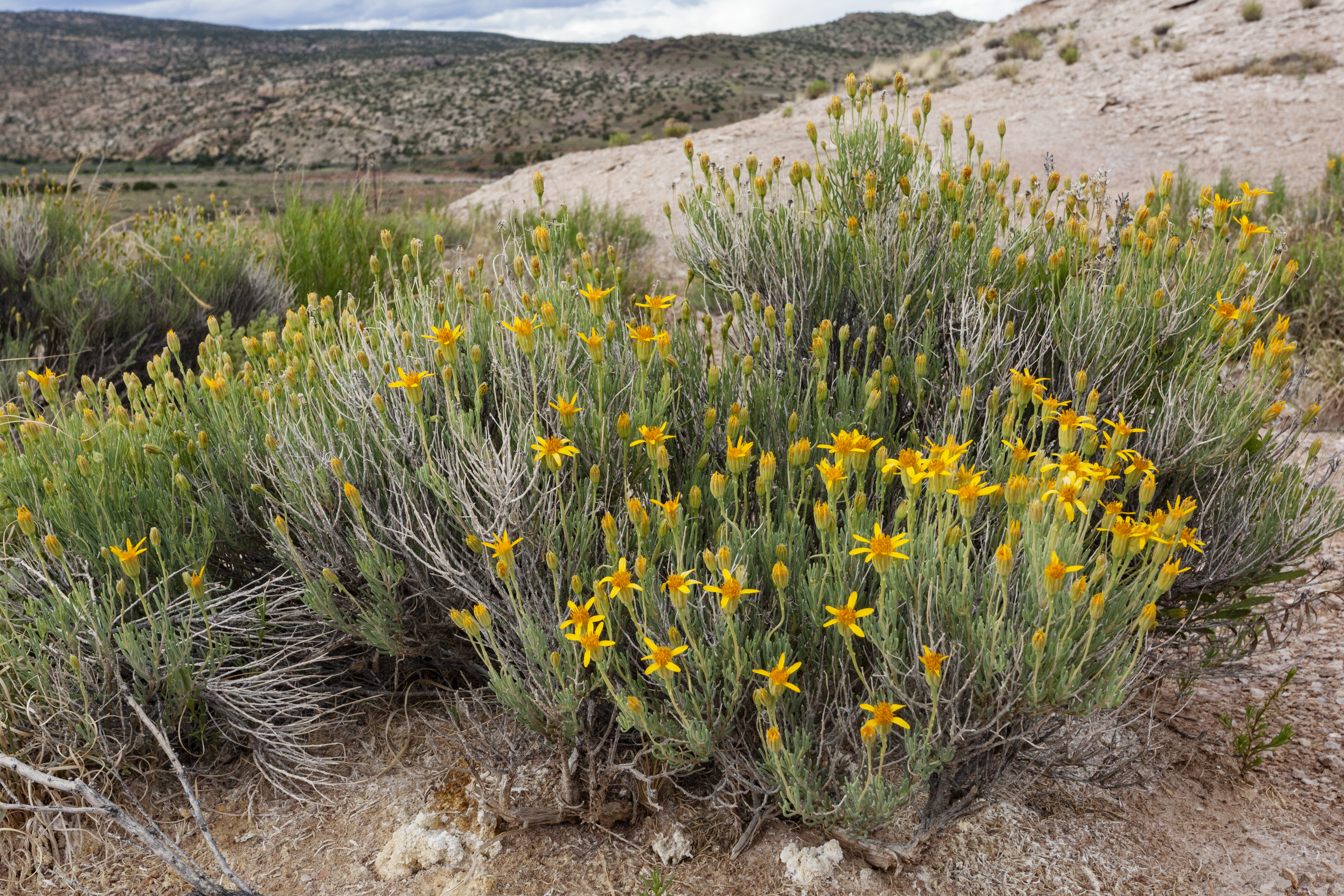
- Pseudoclappia arenaria

Scientific classification
- Kingdom: Plantae
- Clade: Tracheophytes
- Clade: Angiosperms
- Clade: Eudicots
- Clade: Asterids
- Order: Asterales
- Family: Asteraceae
- Subfamily: Asteroideae
- Tribe: Tageteae
- Subtribe: Pectidinae
- Genus: Pseudoclappia; Rydb.

Type species
- Pseudoclappia arenaria Rydb.

= Pseudoclappia =

Genus of plants

Pseudoclappia, the false clapdaisies, is a genus of North American shrubs in the tribe Tageteae within the family Asteraceae.

Species

- Pseudoclappia arenaria Rydb. - Texas, New Mexico, Oklahoma, Coahuila
- Pseudoclappia watsonii A.M.Powell & B.L.Turner - western Texas
