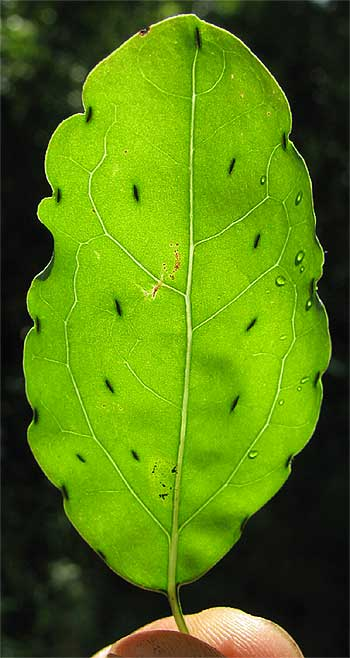
- Porophyllum punctatum leaf spotted with oil glands

Scientific classification
- Kingdom: Plantae
- Clade: Embryophytes
- Clade: Tracheophytes
- Clade: Angiosperms
- Clade: Eudicots
- Clade: Asterids
- Order: Asterales
- Family: Asteraceae
- Genus: Porophyllum
- Species: P. punctatum

Binomial name
- Porophyllum punctatum S.F.Blake, 1917

Synonyms
- Eupatorium milleri Steud. (1840); Eupatorium punctatum Mill. (1768); Kleinia jorullensis Kunth (1818); Porophyllum divaricatum Rydb. (1916); Porophyllum ervendbergii A.Gray (1883); Porophyllum jorullense Cass. (1826); Porophyllum millspaughii B.L.Rob. (1900); Porophyllum nummularium DC. (1836); Porophyllum oblongum Rydb (1916); Porophyllum palmeri Rose (1895); Porophyllum pittieri Rydb. (1916)

= Porophyllum punctatum =

Species of flowering plant

Porophyllum punctatum is a species of flowering plant belonging to the Aster/Composite/Sunflower family, the Asteraceae.

== Description ==
Porophyllum punctatum is a much-branched, hairless, perennial shrub with tremendous size variation, sometimes as tall as 4m (~13 feet). On the stems its leaves usually arise opposite one another. Their blades are up to 3 cm long (~1 1/5 inch) and 2.4 cm wide (~1 inch), with petioles up to 1.2 cm long (~½ inch). Blades are variable in shape and usually along margins bear 2-7 oil-bearing glands on each side, with one terminal gland at the sharp to rounded leaf tip. Sometimes glands also are scattered across the blade surface.

Inflorescences range from "cymose" (the central flower in the inflorescence is the oldest and blooms first, with later flowers growing on side branches) to "corymbose" ( the inflorescence is flat-topped or slightly rounded, because lower flower stalks are longer than upper ones). The flowering heads' involucral bracts number five. Within each head there are 15-30 florets with pale to purple corollas. The one-seeded, cypsela-type fruits are up to 8.1mm long (~1 1/3 inches) and are crowned with purplish to straw-colored pappuses, with each bristle of the pappus bearing very short hairlike projections.

== Distribution ==
Porophyllum punctatum occurs in mainland Mexico's eastern and western coastal states and as far south through Central America as eastern Costa Rica.

== Habitat ==
In Mexico Porophyllum punctatum occurs in disturbed areas where tropical deciduous and semi-deciduous forests develop at elevations below 500m (~1650 feet).

== In traditional medicine ==
In the Mexican state of Yucatán, both infusions and decoctions of the leaves of Porophyllum punctatum are drunk for kidney problems. For the decoctions sometimes lemon leaves are added to the boiling water. In the state of Quintana Roo, one bathes in water from the decoction to cure the results of the evil eye, the mal de ojo. Other general uses in various places include stopping nosebleeds, against gonorrea, chronic ulcers, mange, ringworm, cold sweats in children, and "night sweats" not caused by heat. In Mexico the plant is used to kill lice.

== Taxonomy ==
Within the huge family Asteraceae, the genus Porophyllum resides in the tribe Tageteae and the subtribe Pectidinae.

One reason for the numerous synonyms of Porophyllum punctatum is its great variability, particularly the disposition of its leaf glands. However, plants grown in an experimental greenhouse from cypselae of a single head found that resulting plants bearing very few leaves produced glands just on leaf surfaces, while plants with many leaves developed glands on both leaf surfaces and along the margins. It was concluded that "These factors combined with a continuous geographic and ecological distribution dictate that these shrubs be considered members of one species."

== Etymology ==
In the genus name Porophyllum, the Poro- is derived from the Greek poros, meaning "hole", and phyllon, meaning "leaf," alluding to the taxon's leaves having oil glands.

The species name punctatum, much used in binomials, comes from the New Latin word punctum, meaning "spot, dot, point," and refers to the oil-gland spots on the leaves; In technical English such spotted leaves are said to be "puntate."

== GALLERY ==
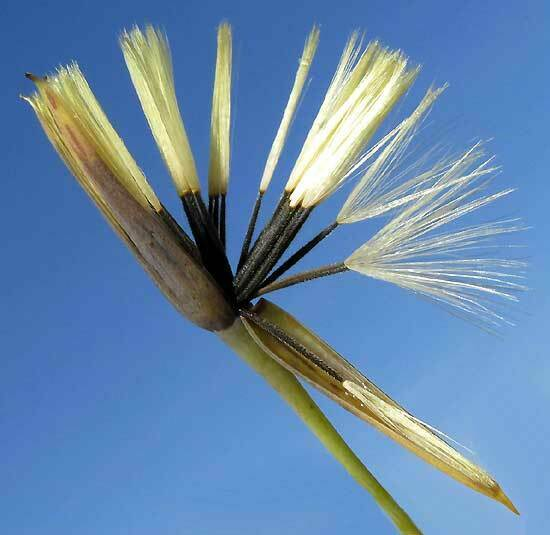
Porophyllum punctatum, with pale pappuses atop dark cypsela-type fruits

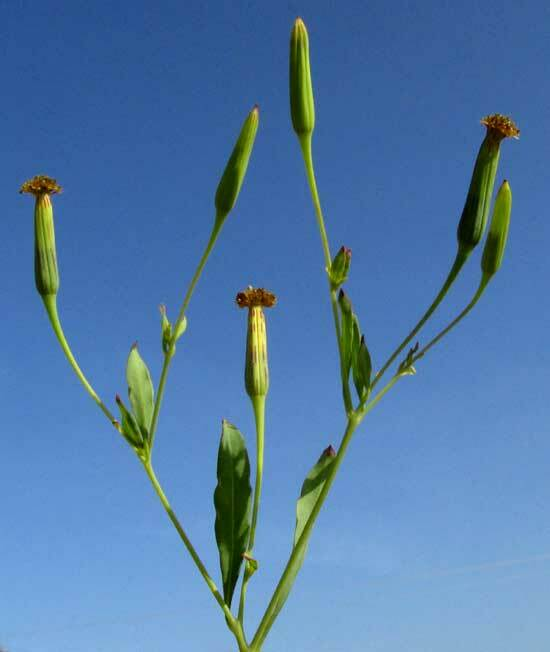
Porophyllum punctatum inflorescence

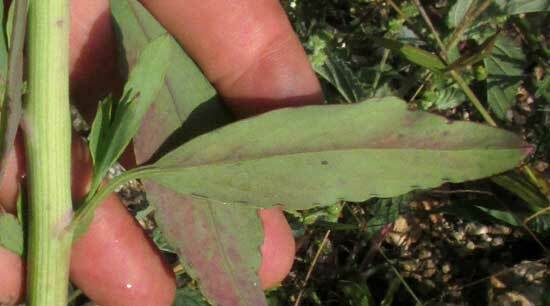
Porophyllum punctatum, slender leaves

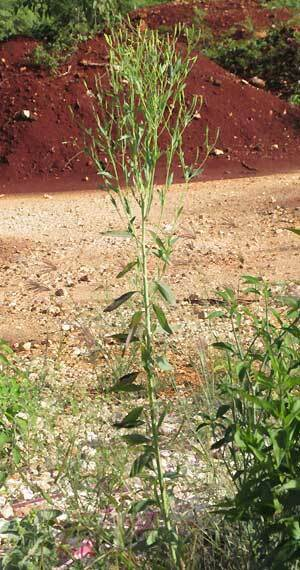
Porophyllum punctatum plant
