= Rubus pittieri =

Scientific classification
- Kingdom: Plantae
- Clade: Tracheophytes
- Clade: Angiosperms
- Clade: Eudicots
- Clade: Rosids
- Order: Rosales
- Family: Rosaceae
- Genus: Rubus
- Species: R. pittieri

Binomial name
- Rubus pittieri Rydb.

Species of fruit and plant

Rubus pittieri is an uncommon Central American species of brambles in the rose family. It has been found only in Costa Rica.

Rubus pittieri is a perennial with curved prickles. Leaves are compound with 3 or 5 leaflets. Flowers are white. Fruits are purple.
