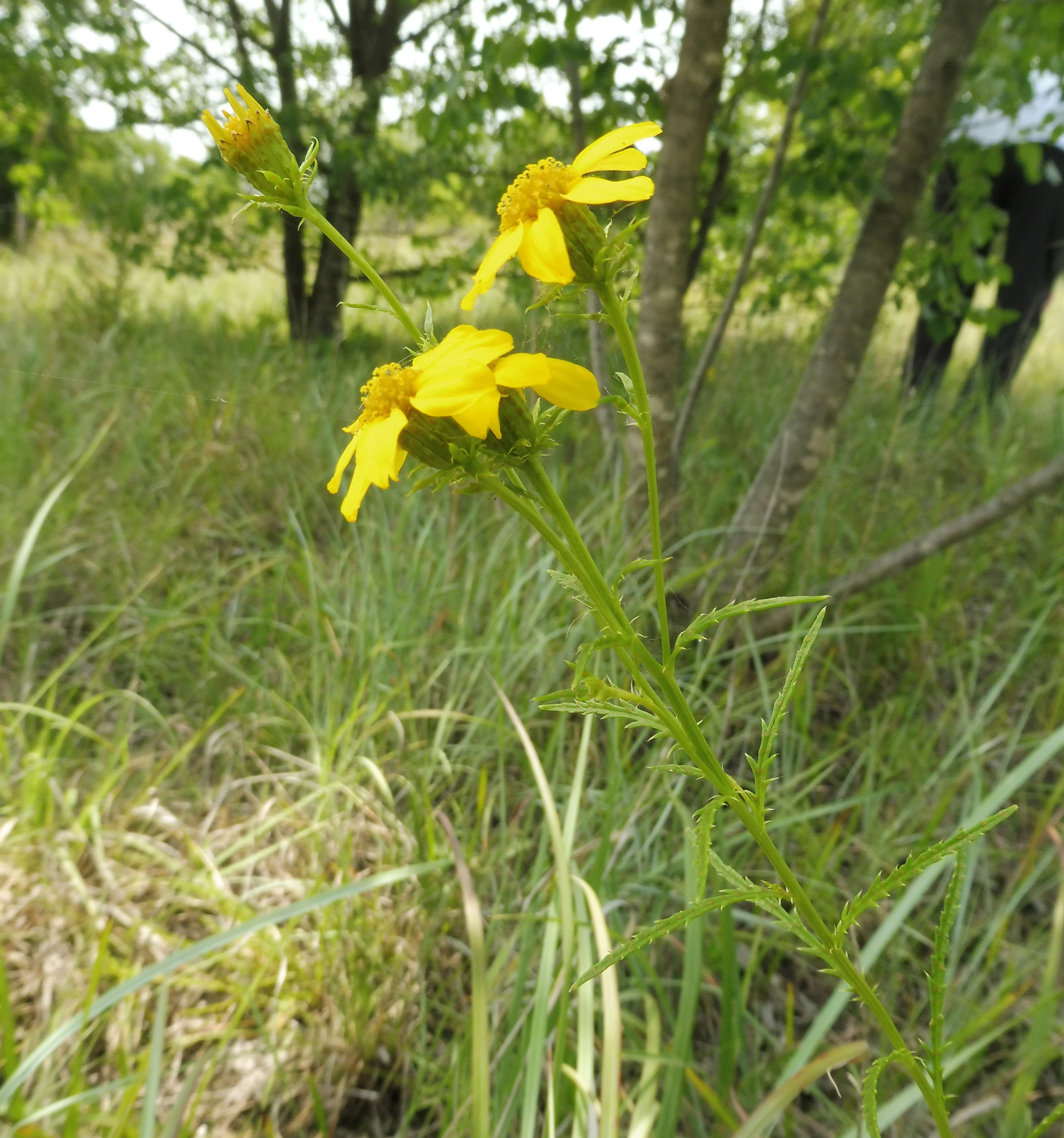

Scientific classification
- Kingdom: Plantae
- Clade: Embryophytes
- Clade: Tracheophytes
- Clade: Angiosperms
- Clade: Eudicots
- Clade: Asterids
- Order: Asterales
- Family: Asteraceae
- Subfamily: Asteroideae
- Tribe: Tageteae
- Subtribe: Pectidinae
- Genus: Dysodiopsis (A.Gray) Rydb. 1915
- Species: D. tagetoides

Binomial name
- Dysodiopsis tagetoides (Torr. & A.Gray) Rydb.

Synonyms
- Synonymy: Dysodiopsis A.Gray; Hymenatherum sect. Dysodiopsis A.Gray; Dyssodia sect. Dysodiopsis (A.Gray) Strother; Dyssodia tagetoides Torr. & A.Gray; Hymenatherum tagetoides (Torr. & A.Gray) A.Gray; Thymophylla tagetoides (Torr. & A.Gray) Small

= Dysodiopsis =

Genus of flowering plants

Dysodiopsis tagetoides, commonly known as false dogfennel, is a species of flowering plant in the family Asteraceae. It is native to the United States, where it is restricted to Oklahoma and Texas. It is found in areas of calcareous soil.

Dysodiopsis is a monotypic genus, and therefore contains no other species.

== Description ==
Dysodiopsis tagetoides is a perennial herb up to 80 cm (6 feet) tall. The plant produces flower heads one at a time or in loose arrays, each head containing as many as 12 yellow ray florets and up to 40 dull yellow disc florets.
