= Haploesthes fruticosa =

Scientific classification
- Kingdom: Plantae
- Clade: Tracheophytes
- Clade: Angiosperms
- Clade: Eudicots
- Clade: Asterids
- Order: Asterales
- Family: Asteraceae
- Genus: Haploesthes
- Species: H. fruticosa

Binomial name
- Haploesthes fruticosa B.L.Turner 1975

Synonyms
- Haploësthes fruticosa

Species of flowering plant

Haploesthes fruticosa is a Mexican species of flowering plants in the family Asteraceae. It grows in northeastern Mexico (Coahuila and Nuevo León).

The genus name is sometimes spelled Haploësthes, with two dots over the first e to indicate that the o and the e are to be pronounced in separate syllables. This is optional; either spelling is equally acceptable.

Haploesthes fruticosa is a woody shrub up to 150 cm (5 feet) tall. It is very similar to H. greggii except for its woody habit and a few differences in the shape of the involucral bracts covering the lower parts of the flower heads.
