= Hydropectis =

Scientific classification
- Kingdom: Plantae
- Clade: Tracheophytes
- Clade: Angiosperms
- Clade: Eudicots
- Clade: Asterids
- Order: Asterales
- Family: Asteraceae
- Subfamily: Asteroideae
- Tribe: Tageteae
- Subtribe: Pectidinae
- Genus: Hydropectis; Rydb.

Type species
- Pectis aquatica S.Wats.

Synonyms
- Hydrodyssodia B.L.Turner

Genus of plants

Hydropectis is a genus of Mexican flowering plants in the family Asteraceae.

Species

- Hydropectis aquatica (S.Wats.) Rydb. - Chihuahua, Durango
- Hydropectis estradii B.L.Turner - Chihuahua
- Hydropectis stevensii McVaugh - Jalisco, Guanajuato
