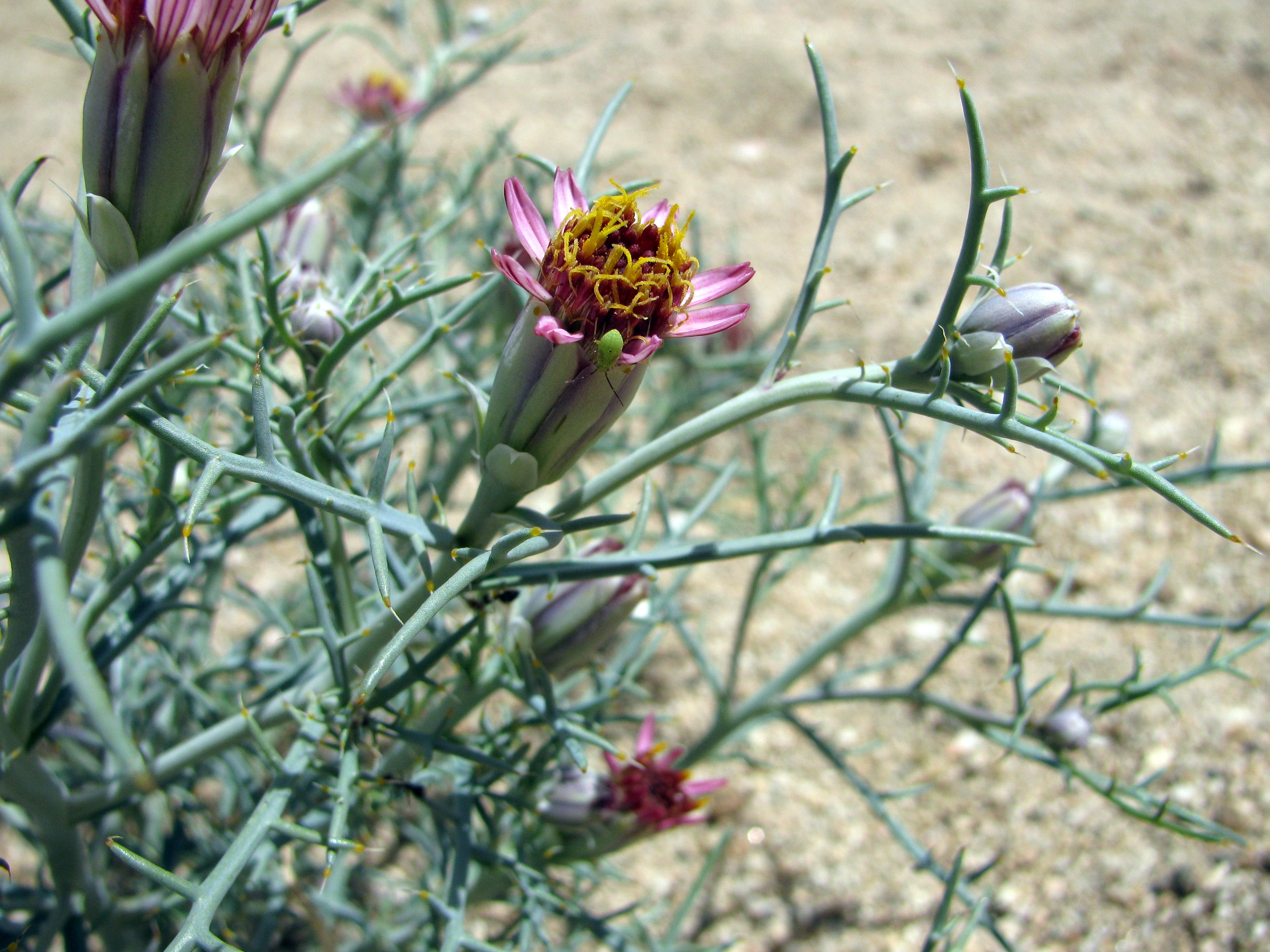

Scientific classification
- Kingdom: Plantae
- Clade: Tracheophytes
- Clade: Angiosperms
- Clade: Eudicots
- Clade: Asterids
- Order: Asterales
- Family: Asteraceae
- Genus: Nicolletia
- Species: N. occidentalis

Binomial name
- Nicolletia occidentalis A.Gray

= Nicolletia occidentalis =

Species of flowering plant

Nicolletia occidentalis is a flowering plant in the tribe Tageteae of the family Asteraceae which is known by the common name Mojave hole-in-the-sand plant.

This flower is native to California, especially the Mojave Desert, and northern Baja California.

== Description ==
Nicolletia occidentalis is a desert-adapted perennial herb with a skeletonlike appearance. The narrow, fleshy leaves each end in a bristle and have large oil glands which exude a strong unpleasant scent. The plant grows from a deep taproot in the desert sand and the stem is sometimes surrounded by a depression in the sand, a trait that gives it its common name.

This plant bears showy flowers with curving bright pink ray florets and yellow centers.
