= Arnicastrum =

Scientific classification
- Kingdom: Plantae
- Clade: Embryophytes
- Clade: Tracheophytes
- Clade: Angiosperms
- Clade: Eudicots
- Clade: Asterids
- Order: Asterales
- Family: Asteraceae
- Subfamily: Asteroideae
- Tribe: Tageteae
- Subtribe: Pectidinae
- Genus: Arnicastrum; Greenm.

Type species
- Arnicastrum glandulosum Greenm.

Genus of flowering plants

Arnicastrum is a genus of flowering plants in the family Asteraceae.

Species

Both species are endemic to Mexico.

- Arnicastrum glandulosum Greenm. - Chihuahua, Durango
- Arnicastrum guerrerense Villaseñor - Guerrero
