= Oxypappus =

Scientific classification
- Kingdom: Plantae
- Clade: Tracheophytes
- Clade: Angiosperms
- Clade: Eudicots
- Clade: Asterids
- Order: Asterales
- Family: Asteraceae
- Subfamily: Asteroideae
- Tribe: Tageteae
- Subtribe: Pectidinae
- Genus: Oxypappus; Benth.
- Species: O. scaber

Binomial name
- Oxypappus scaber Benth.

Synonyms
- Chrysopsis scabra Hook. & Arn. 1841, illegitimate homonym not Elliott 1823

Genus of flowering plants

Oxypappus is a genus of flowering plants in the tribe Tageteae within the family Asteraceae.

The only known species is Oxypappus scaber, native to western Mexico from Sinaloa to Oaxaca.

formerly included

- Oxypappus seemannii (Sch.Bip.) Blake - Pectis bonplandiana Kunth
