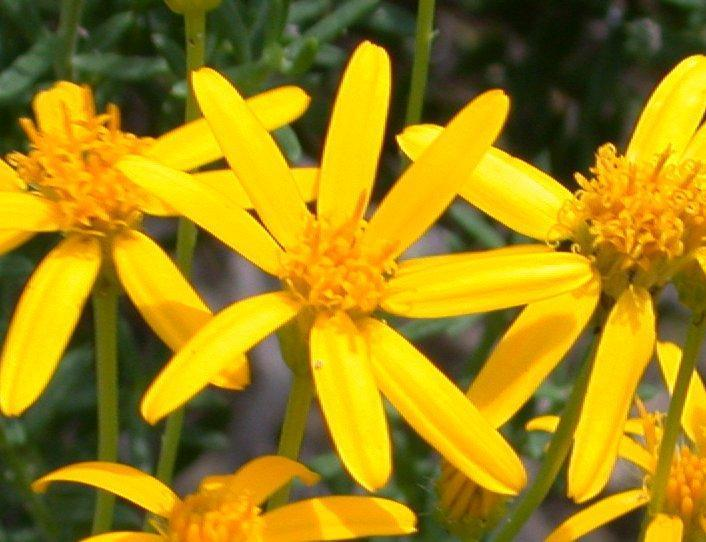
- Chrysactinia mexicana

Scientific classification
- Kingdom: Plantae
- Clade: Tracheophytes
- Clade: Angiosperms
- Clade: Eudicots
- Clade: Asterids
- Order: Asterales
- Family: Asteraceae
- Subfamily: Asteroideae
- Tribe: Tageteae
- Subtribe: Pectidinae
- Genus: Chrysactinia; A.Gray

Type species
- Chrysactinia mexicana A.Gray

= Chrysactinia =

Genus of flowering plants

Chrysactinia is a genus of flowering plants in the family Asteraceae, native to Mexico and to the southwestern United States.

Species

- Chrysactinia acerosa S.F.Blake - San Luis Potosí, Nuevo León, Zacatecas
- Chrysactinia lehtoae D.J.Keil - Sinaloa
- Chrysactinia luzmariae Rzed. & Calderón - Guanajuato
- Chrysactinia mexicana A.Gray - Texas, New Mexico, Aguascalientes, Chihuahua, Coahuila, Durango, Guanajuato, Hidalgo, México State, Nuevo León, Oaxaca, Puebla, Querétaro, San Luis Potosí, Zacatecas, Tamaulipas, Veracruz
- Chrysactinia pinnata S.Watson - Coahuila, Nuevo León, Querétaro, San Luis Potosí, Tamaulipas
- Chrysactinia truncata S.Watson - Nuevo León, Coahuila, San Luis Potosí, Tamaulipas, Zacatecas
