= Varilla (plant) =

Scientific classification
- Kingdom: Plantae
- Clade: Tracheophytes
- Clade: Angiosperms
- Clade: Eudicots
- Clade: Asterids
- Order: Asterales
- Family: Asteraceae
- Subfamily: Asteroideae
- Tribe: Tageteae
- Subtribe: Varillinae
- Genus: Varilla; A.Gray

Type species
- Varilla mexicana A.Gray

Genus of flowering plants

Varilla is a genus of flowering plants in the family Asteraceae described as a genus in 1849.

The name Varilla is the Spanish word for "rod" or "wand." The genus is native to Texas and northern Mexico.

Species

- Varilla mexicana A.Gray - Chihuahua, Coahuila, Durango, Zacatecas
- Varilla texana A.Gray - southern Texas, Tamaulipas, Nuevo León
