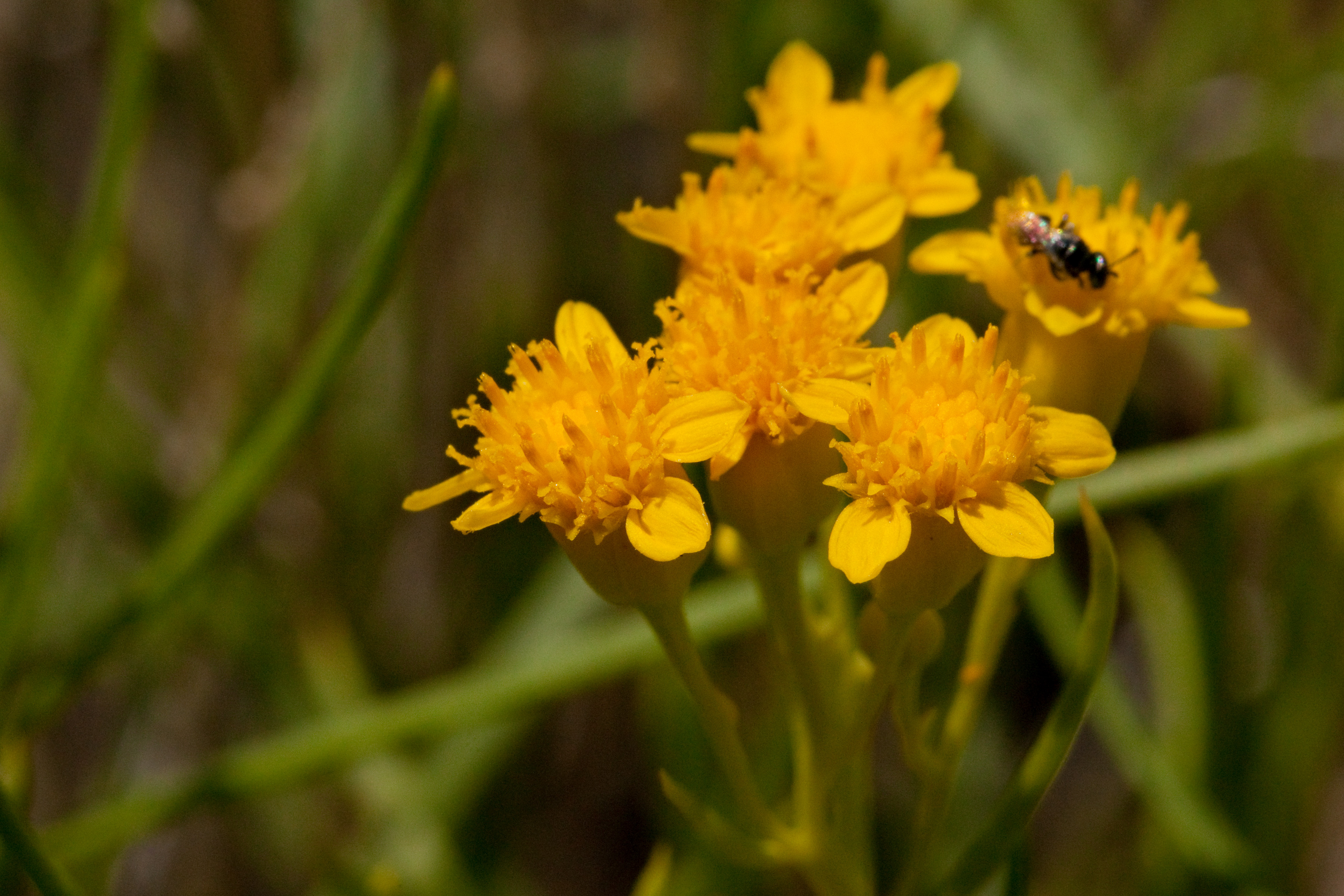
- Haploesthes greggii

Scientific classification
- Kingdom: Plantae
- Clade: Tracheophytes
- Clade: Angiosperms
- Clade: Eudicots
- Clade: Asterids
- Order: Asterales
- Family: Asteraceae
- Subfamily: Asteroideae
- Tribe: Tageteae
- Subtribe: Flaveriinae
- Genus: Haploesthes; A.Gray

Type species
- Haploesthes greggii A.Gray

Synonyms
- Haploësthes alternate spelling

= Haploesthes =

Genus of flowering plants

Haploesthes is a North American genus of flowering plants in the family Asteraceae. It grows in Mexico and in the southwestern United States. They are perennial herbs or subshrubs with yellow flower heads.

The name is sometimes spelled Haploësthes, with a diaeresis over the first e to indicate that the o and the e are to be pronounced in separate syllables. This is optional; either spelling is equally acceptable.

Species

- Haploesthes fruticosa B.L.Turner - Coahuila, Nuevo León
- Haploesthes greggii A.Gray - Coahuila, Nuevo León, Texas, New Mexico, Oklahoma, Colorado, Kansas
- Haploesthes hintoniana B.L.Turner
- Haploesthes robusta I.M.Johnst. - Coahuila
