= Chrysactinia luzmariae =

Scientific classification
- Kingdom: Plantae
- Clade: Tracheophytes
- Clade: Angiosperms
- Clade: Eudicots
- Clade: Asterids
- Order: Asterales
- Family: Asteraceae
- Genus: Chrysactinia
- Species: C. luzmariae

Binomial name
- Chrysactinia luzmariae Rzed. & Calderón

Species of flowering plant native to Mexico

Chrysactinia luzmariae is a Mexican species of flowering plants in the family Asteraceae. It is native to north-central Mexico, in the state of Guanajuato.

Chrysactinia luzmariae is a shrub up to 50 cm (20 inches) tall. Leaves are pinnately lobed with a sharp point at the tip. Flower heads have yellow ray flowers and yellow disc flowers. The species grows in brushy chaparral regions.
