= Lescaillea =

Scientific classification
- Kingdom: Plantae
- Clade: Tracheophytes
- Clade: Angiosperms
- Clade: Eudicots
- Clade: Asterids
- Order: Asterales
- Family: Asteraceae
- Subfamily: Asteroideae
- Tribe: Tageteae
- Subtribe: Pectidinae
- Genus: Lescaillea; Griseb.
- Species: L. equisetiformis

Binomial name
- Lescaillea equisetiformis Griseb.

Genus of flowering plants

Lescaillea is a genus of Cuban flowering plants in the tribe Tageteae within the family Asteraceae.

Species

There is only one known species, Lescaillea equisetiformis, native to Cuba.
