= Chrysactinia lehtoae =

Scientific classification
- Kingdom: Plantae
- Clade: Tracheophytes
- Clade: Angiosperms
- Clade: Eudicots
- Clade: Asterids
- Order: Asterales
- Family: Asteraceae
- Genus: Chrysactinia
- Species: C. lehtoae

Binomial name
- Chrysactinia lehtoae D.J.Keil

Species of flowering plant native to Mexico

Chrysactinia lehtoae is a Mexican species of flowering plants in the family Asteraceae. It is native to northwestern Mexico, found only in pine-oak forests in northern Sinaloa.

Chrysactinia lehtoae is a small, branching, evergreen subshrub up to 30 cm (12 inches) tall. Leaves are pinnately lobed. Flower heads have yellow ray flowers and yellow-green disc flowers.
