= Henry Parker Sartwell =

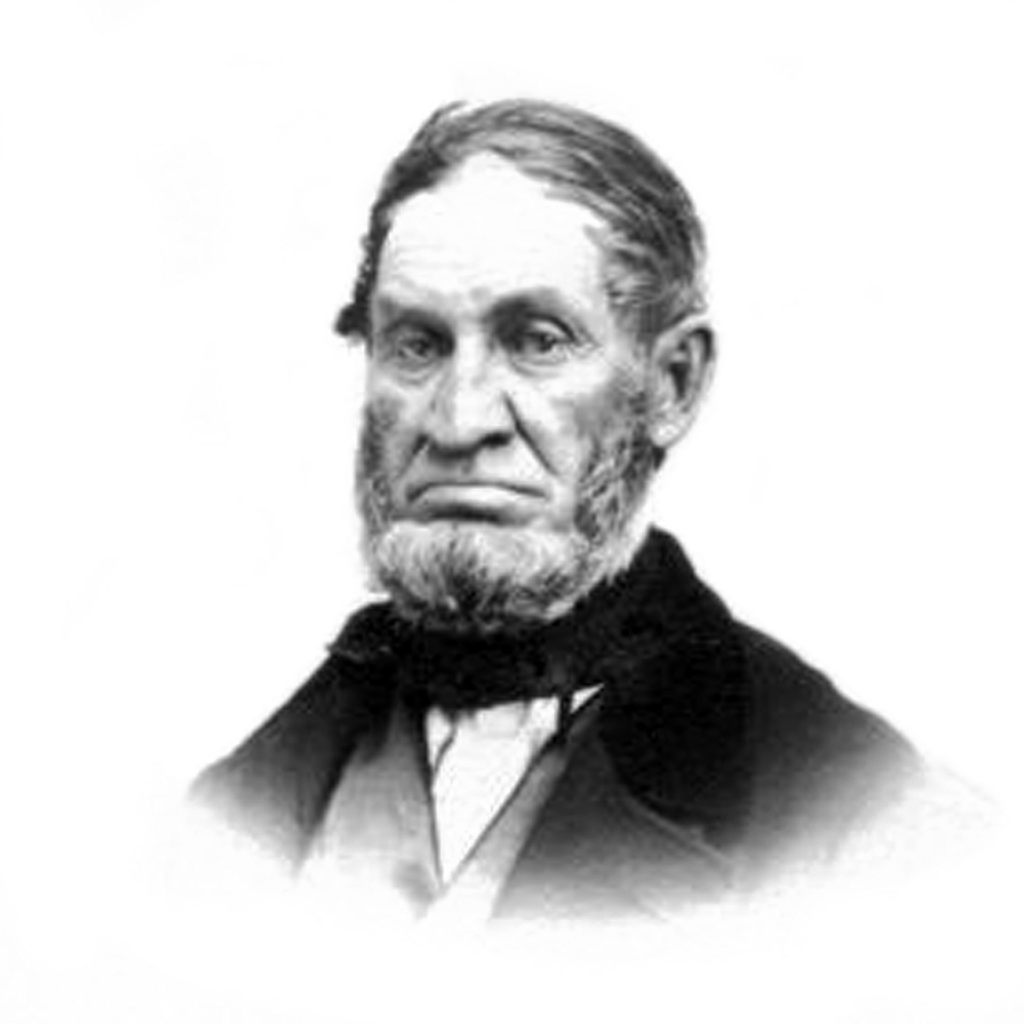
- Henry Parker Sartwell (1864)
- Born: April 18, 1792; Pittsfield, Massachusetts
- Died: November 15, 1867 (aged 75); Penn Yan, New York
- Occupation: Botanist

Henry Parker Sartwell (April 18, 1792 – November 15, 1867) was an American botanist.

== Biography ==
Sartwell was a medical doctor and botanist for whom was named the plant-genus Sartwellia, was born at Pittsfield, Massachusetts, April 18, 1792, and died November 15, 1867, at Penn Yan, New York. He began the practice of medicine early in life, and was a surgeon in the United States army in the War of 1812. He afterward made his home in Ontario County, New York, and about 1830 settled at Penn Yan, in an adjoining county, where he continued his medical practice for the remainder of his life. He devoted much of his time for many years to the study of botany, and particularly to the large and difficult genus Carex. He issued sets of these plants, as an exsiccata under the title "Carices Americae Septentrionalis exsiccatae," of which the first part appeared in 1848 and the second in 1850; the third part was in course of preparation at the time of his death, but was never published. Dr. Sartwell was also the author of a "Catalogue of plants growing without cultivation in the vicinity of Seneca and Crooked lakes, in western New York" published in 1845 in the fifty-eighth annual report of the Regents of the University of New York.

In 1864, Hamilton College conferred upon him the degree of Ph.D.; and at about the same time he sold to that institution his very extensive private herbarium, containing not only the results of his own collecting for many years, but numerous specimens secured by exchange with Buckley, Torrey, Barratt, Boott, and other botanists. His most intimate associate in the study of sedges, Professor Chester Dewey, of Rochester, New York, survived him only one month.

== Works ==
- Catalogue of plants, growing without cultivation in the vicinity of Seneca and Crooked lakes, in western New York (1835)
- Carices Americae Septentrionalis exsiccatae (1848 & 1850)
- Catalogue of specimens in the plant collection of Henry Parker Sartwell
