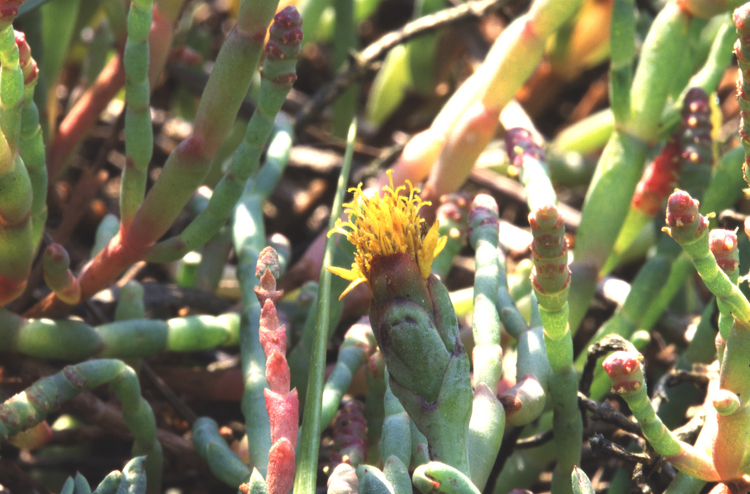
- Jaumea carnosa

Scientific classification
- Kingdom: Plantae
- Clade: Tracheophytes
- Clade: Angiosperms
- Clade: Eudicots
- Clade: Asterids
- Order: Asterales
- Family: Asteraceae
- Subfamily: Asteroideae
- Tribe: Tageteae
- Subtribe: Jaumeinae; Benth. & Hook.f.
- Genus: Jaumea; Pers.

Type species
- Jaumea linearis Pers. 1807

Synonyms
- Coinogyne Less.

= Jaumea =

Genus of flowering plants

Jaumea is a genus of flowering plants in the family Asteraceae. The plants are sprawling perennial herbs branching mostly from the base. Flower heads are yellow, with disc flowers and also usually with ray flowers.

The genus is named for French botanist J. H. Jaume St. Hilaire, 1772–1845.

Species

- Jaumea carnosa (Less.) A.Gray - British Columbia, Washington, Oregon, California, Baja California, Sonora, Jalisco
- Jaumea chevalieri O.Hoffm. - tropical Africa
- Jaumea helenae Buscal. & Muschl. - Zimbabwe
- Jaumea linearifolia (Juss.) DC. - Uruguay, northeastern Argentina
- Jaumea linearis Pers. - Brazil
- Jaumea peduncularis (Hook. & Arn.) Benth. & Hook.f. ex Oliv. - Jalisco
- Jaumea rotundifolia Mattf. - Cameroon
