= Arnicastrum guerrerense =

Scientific classification
- Kingdom: Plantae
- Clade: Tracheophytes
- Clade: Angiosperms
- Clade: Eudicots
- Clade: Asterids
- Order: Asterales
- Family: Asteraceae
- Genus: Arnicastrum
- Species: A. guerrerense

Binomial name
- Arnicastrum guerrerense Villaseñor

Species of flowering plant

Arnicastrum guerrerense (sometimes called A. guerrense), of the family Asteraceae, is a perennial herb with yellow flowers. It is found in Mexico. It was discovered in 1983 in the mountains of Sierra Madre del Sur in the Mexican state of Guerrero and described in the scientific magazine Systematic Botany 3 years later. It was found at 3200m above sea level in a coniferous forest with predominant Pinus hartwegii and Abies. Although it is just known from Mexico, the Mexican red list of endangered plants describes it as non-endemic.

== Red List Status ==
A. guerrerense is listed on the official red list of Mexico as a plant which needs "special protection".

== Literature ==
Villaseñor, J. L. 1986. A New Species of the Mexican Genus Arnicastrum Greenm. (Asteraceae: Heliantheae). Systematic Botany 11(2):277-279.
