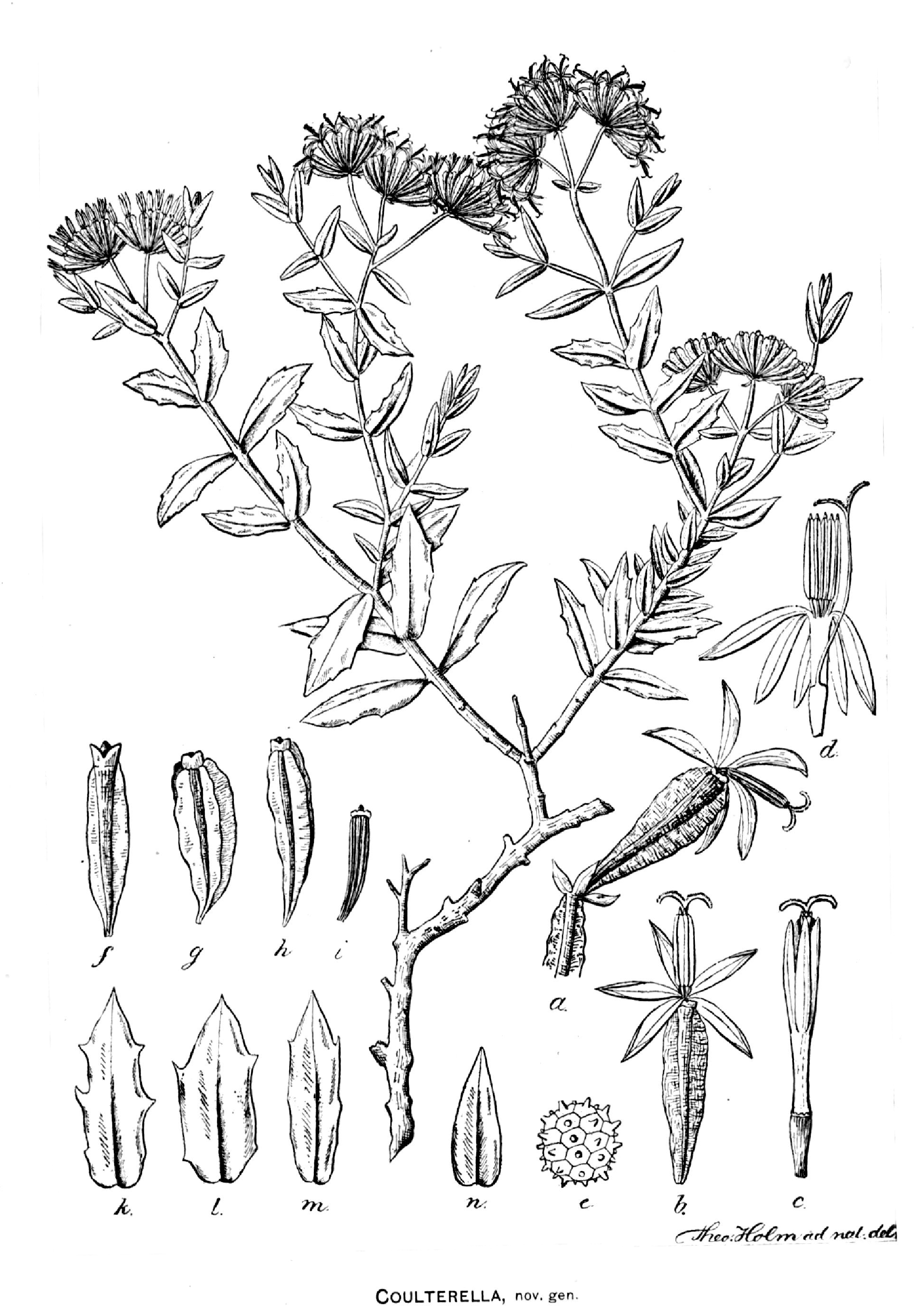

Scientific classification
- Kingdom: Plantae
- Clade: Tracheophytes
- Clade: Angiosperms
- Clade: Eudicots
- Clade: Asterids
- Order: Asterales
- Family: Asteraceae
- Subfamily: Asteroideae
- Tribe: Tageteae
- Subtribe: Varillinae
- Genus: Coulterella; Vasey & Rose
- Species: C. capitata

Binomial name
- Coulterella capitata Vasey & Rose

Synonyms
- Coulterella vaseyi Rose ex O.Hoffm.

= Coulterella =

Genus of flowering plants

Coulterella capitata is a species of flowering plants in the daisy family. It is the only species of genus Coulterella. Coulterella was placed in the monotypic subtribe Coulterellinae, but is now included in Varillinae. Coulterella capitata is endemic to the State of Baja California Sur in northwestern Mexico.
