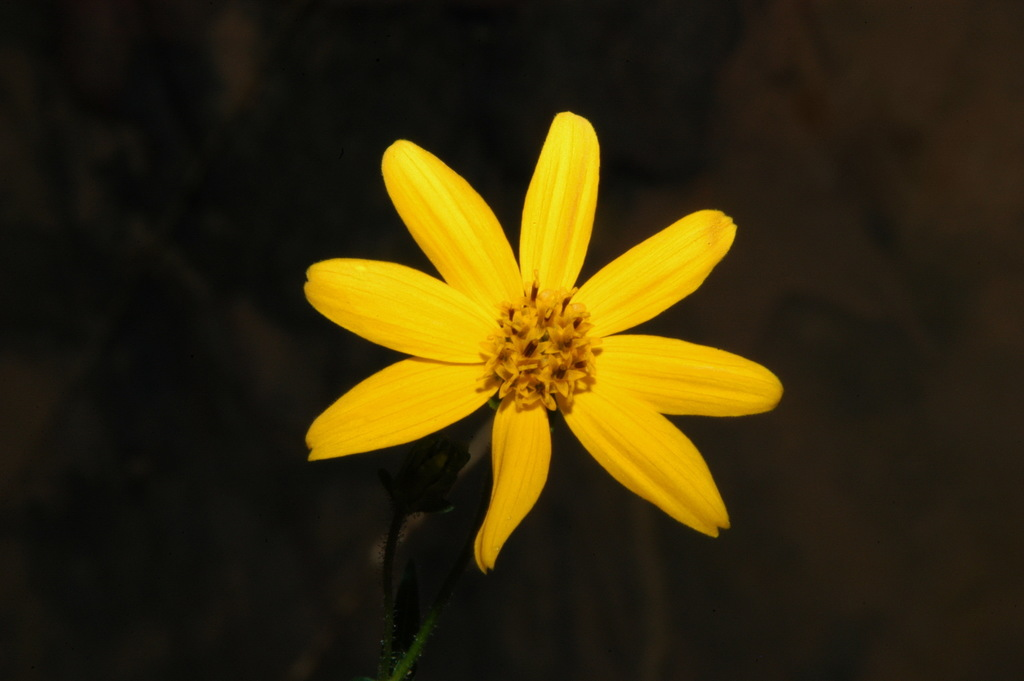

Scientific classification
- Kingdom: Plantae
- Clade: Tracheophytes
- Clade: Angiosperms
- Clade: Eudicots
- Clade: Asterids
- Order: Asterales
- Family: Asteraceae
- Subfamily: Asteroideae
- Tribe: Tageteae
- Subtribe: Pectidinae
- Genus: Jamesianthus; S.F.Blake & Sherff
- Species: J. alabamensis

Binomial name
- Jamesianthus alabamensis S.F.Blake & Sherff

= Jamesianthus =

Genus of flowering plants

Jamesianthus is a genus of North American flowering plants in the family Asteraceae.

The genus is named for US botanist Robert Leslie James (1897–1977).

Species

There is only one known species, Jamesianthus alabamensis, called the Alabama warbonnet. It is native to the US states of Alabama and Georgia.
