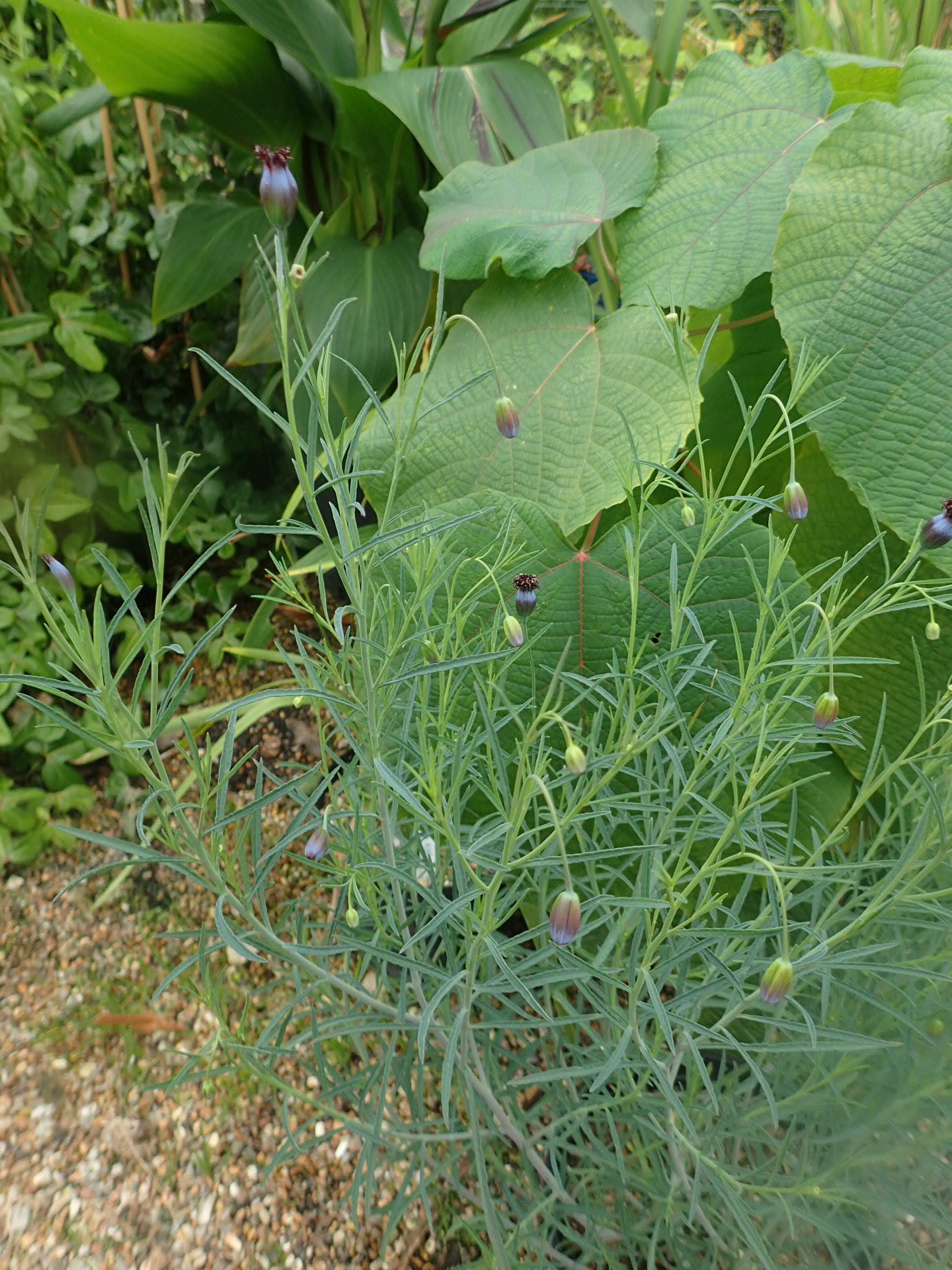
- specimen of a Porophyllum linaria

Scientific classification
- Kingdom: Plantae
- Clade: Tracheophytes
- Clade: Angiosperms
- Clade: Eudicots
- Clade: Asterids
- Order: Asterales
- Family: Asteraceae
- Genus: Porophyllum
- Species: P. linaria

Binomial name
- Porophyllum linaria (Cav.) DC.

Synonyms
- Porophyllum tagetoides (Kunth) DC.

= Porophyllum linaria =

Species of plant

Porophyllum linaria (pipicha, pepicha, chepiche) is a sunny short-lived perennial plant used in Mexican cuisine, where it is often used to flavor meat dishes. It has a strong taste akin to fresh coriander with overtones of lemon and anise.

In some Mexican markets fresh and dried material is available for sale as a condiment. It is also used as a medicinal herb.
