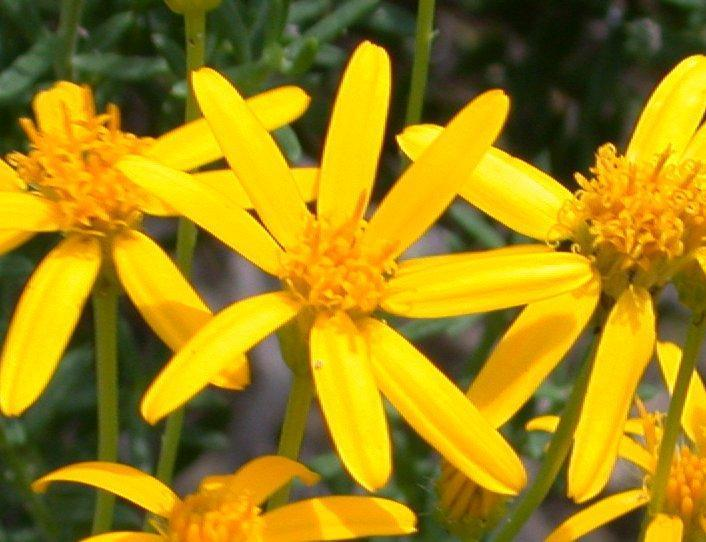

Scientific classification
- Kingdom: Plantae
- Clade: Tracheophytes
- Clade: Angiosperms
- Clade: Eudicots
- Clade: Asterids
- Order: Asterales
- Family: Asteraceae
- Genus: Chrysactinia
- Species: C. mexicana

Binomial name
- Chrysactinia mexicana A.Gray

Synonyms
- Pectis taxifolia Greene

= Chrysactinia mexicana =

Species of flowering plant in native to Mexico and the US

Chrysactinia mexicana, common name Damianita daisy, is a species of flowering plants in the family Asteraceae, native to Mexico and to the southwestern United States. It has been found in Texas, New Mexico, Aguascalientes, Chihuahua, Coahuila, Durango, Guanajuato, Hidalgo, México State, Nuevo León, Oaxaca, Puebla, Querétaro, San Luis Potosí, Zacatecas, Tamaulipas, and Veracruz.

Chrysactinia mexicana is an evergreen subshrub up to 80 cm (32 inches) tall. It is branched, usually with one flower head per branch. Heads have bright yellow ray flowers and yellow or orange disc flowers. Achenes are distributed by the wind, much like those of the common dandelion (Taraxacum officinale).

The species is sometimes cultivated as an ornamental because of its attractive flower heads and its aromatic properties.

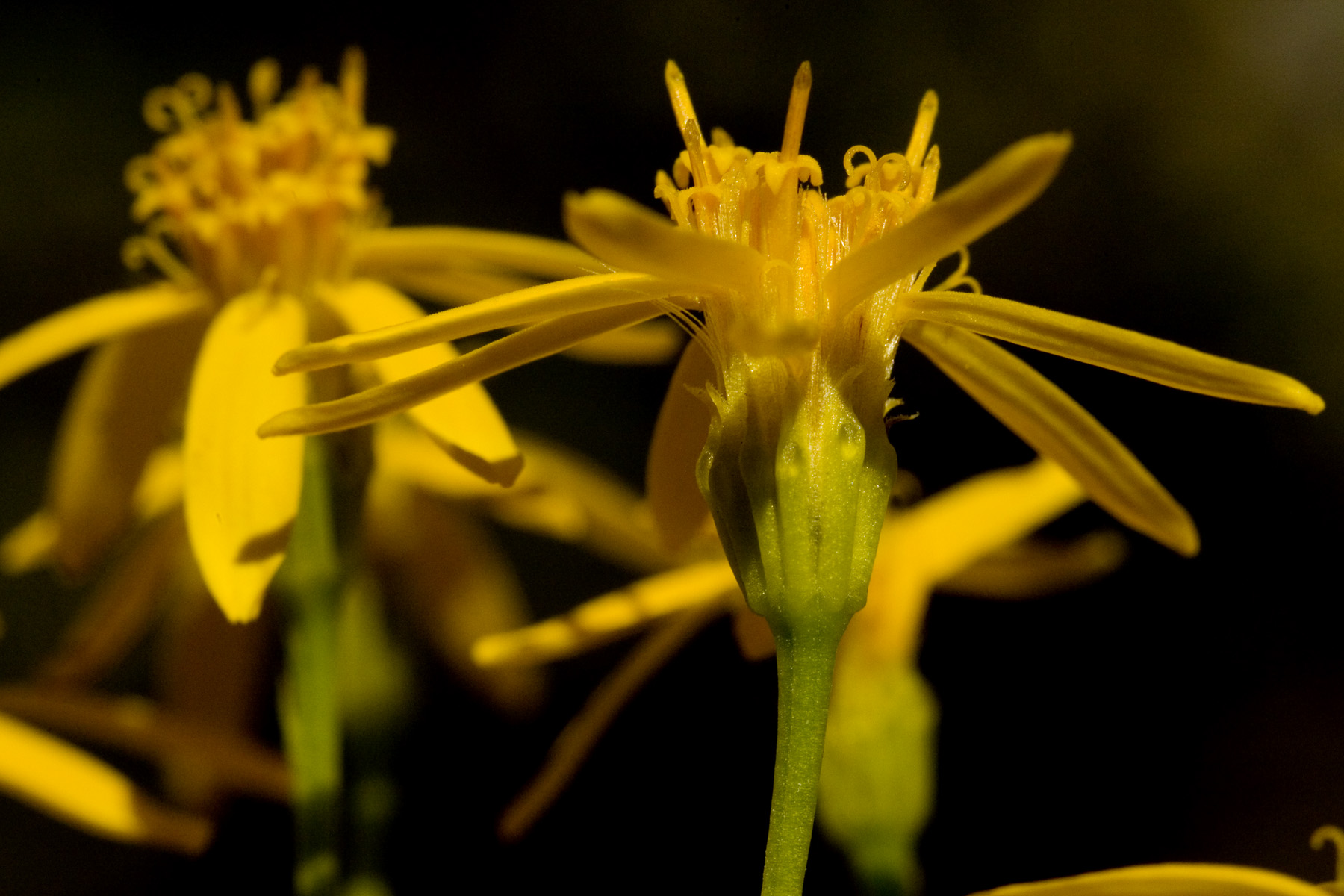

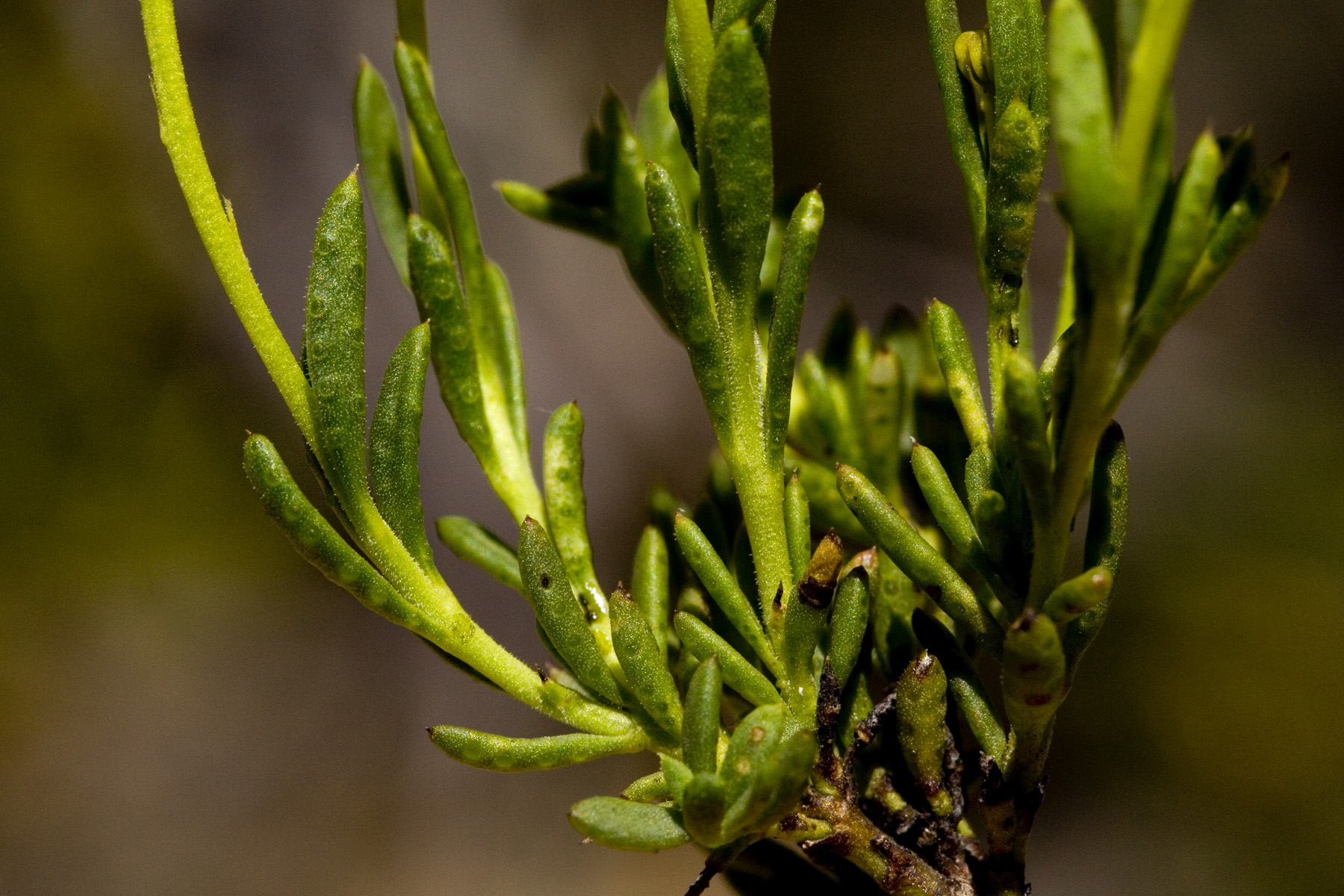

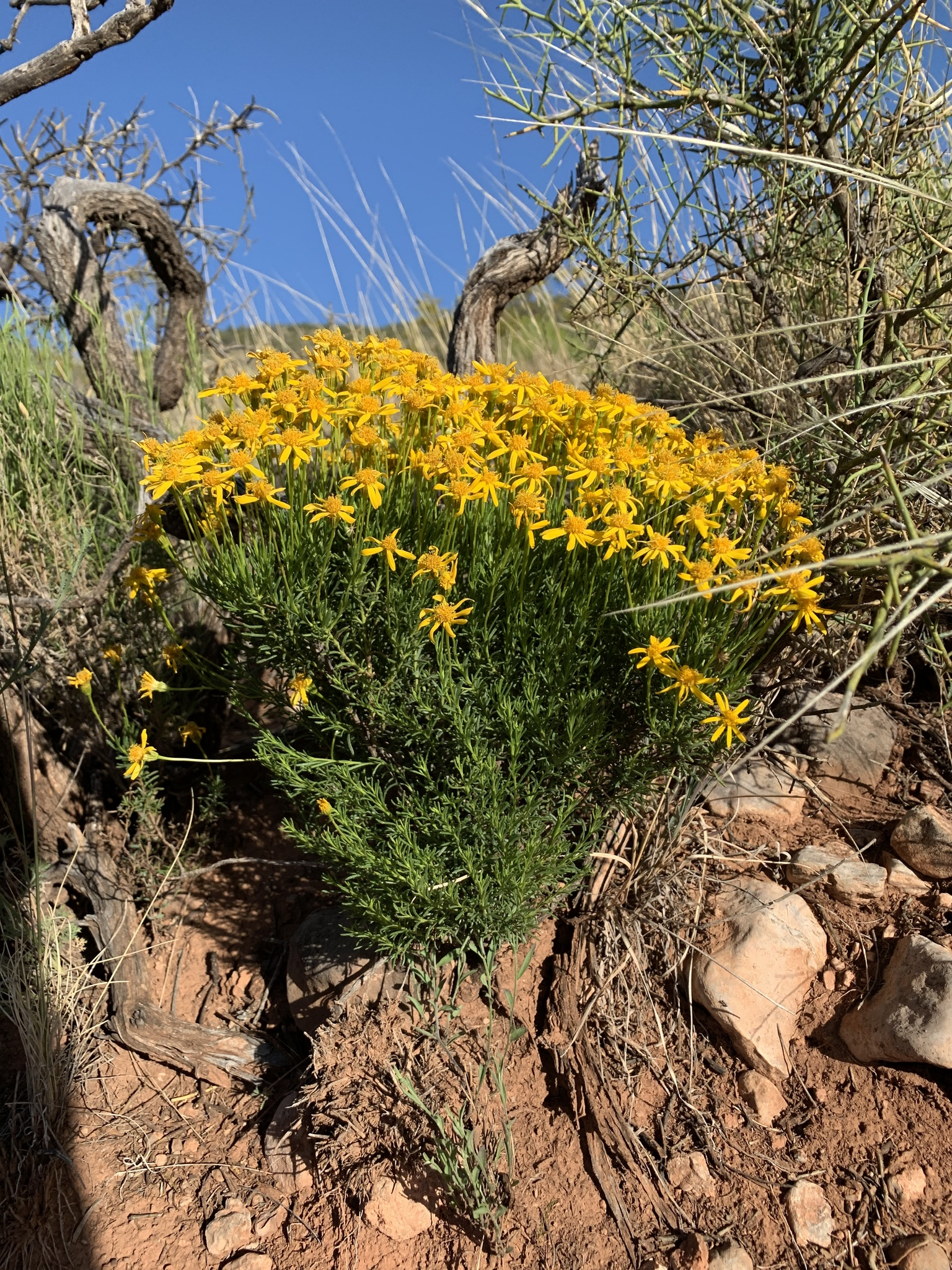

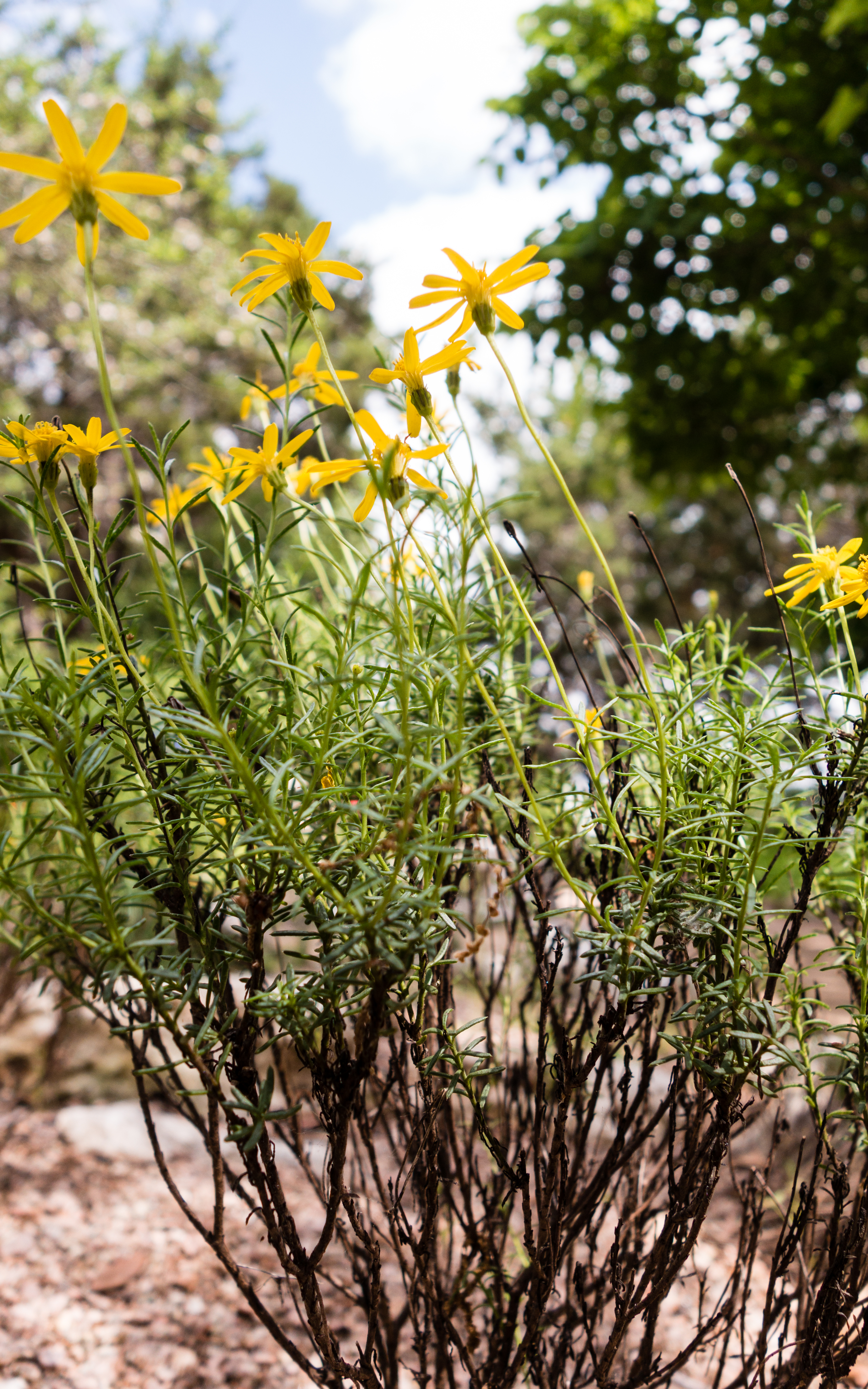
