= Schizotrichia =

Scientific classification
- Kingdom: Plantae
- Clade: Embryophytes
- Clade: Tracheophytes
- Clade: Angiosperms
- Clade: Eudicots
- Clade: Asterids
- Order: Asterales
- Family: Asteraceae
- Subfamily: Asteroideae
- Tribe: Tageteae
- Subtribe: Pectidinae
- Genus: Schizotrichia; Benth.

Type species
- Schizotrichia eupatorioides Benth.

Genus of flowering plants

Schizotrichia is a genus of flowering plants in the tribe Tageteae within the family Asteraceae.

The generic name "Schizotrichia" means "split hair", referring to the forked nature of the plant's hairs.

== Species ==
- Schizotrichia eupatorioides Benth. – Amazonas Region in Peru
- Schizotrichia friasensis – Piura Region in Peru
- Schizotrichia jelskii (Hieron.) Strother ex Loockerman, B.L.Turner & R.K.Jansen – Peru
- Schizotrichia lopez-mirandae – La Libertad Region in Peru
- Schizotrichia remota – Huánuco Region in Peru
