= Strotheria =

Scientific classification
- Kingdom: Plantae
- Clade: Tracheophytes
- Clade: Angiosperms
- Clade: Eudicots
- Clade: Asterids
- Order: Asterales
- Family: Asteraceae
- Subfamily: Asteroideae
- Tribe: Tageteae
- Subtribe: Pectidinae
- Genus: Strotheria; B.L.Turner
- Species: S. gypsophila

Binomial name
- Strotheria gypsophila B.L.Turner

Synonyms
- Graciela frankenioides Rzed.

Genus of plants

Strotheria is a genus of flowering plants in the tribe Tageteae within the family Asteraceae.

Species

The only known species is Strotheria gypsophila, native to the State of Nuevo León in northeastern Mexico.
