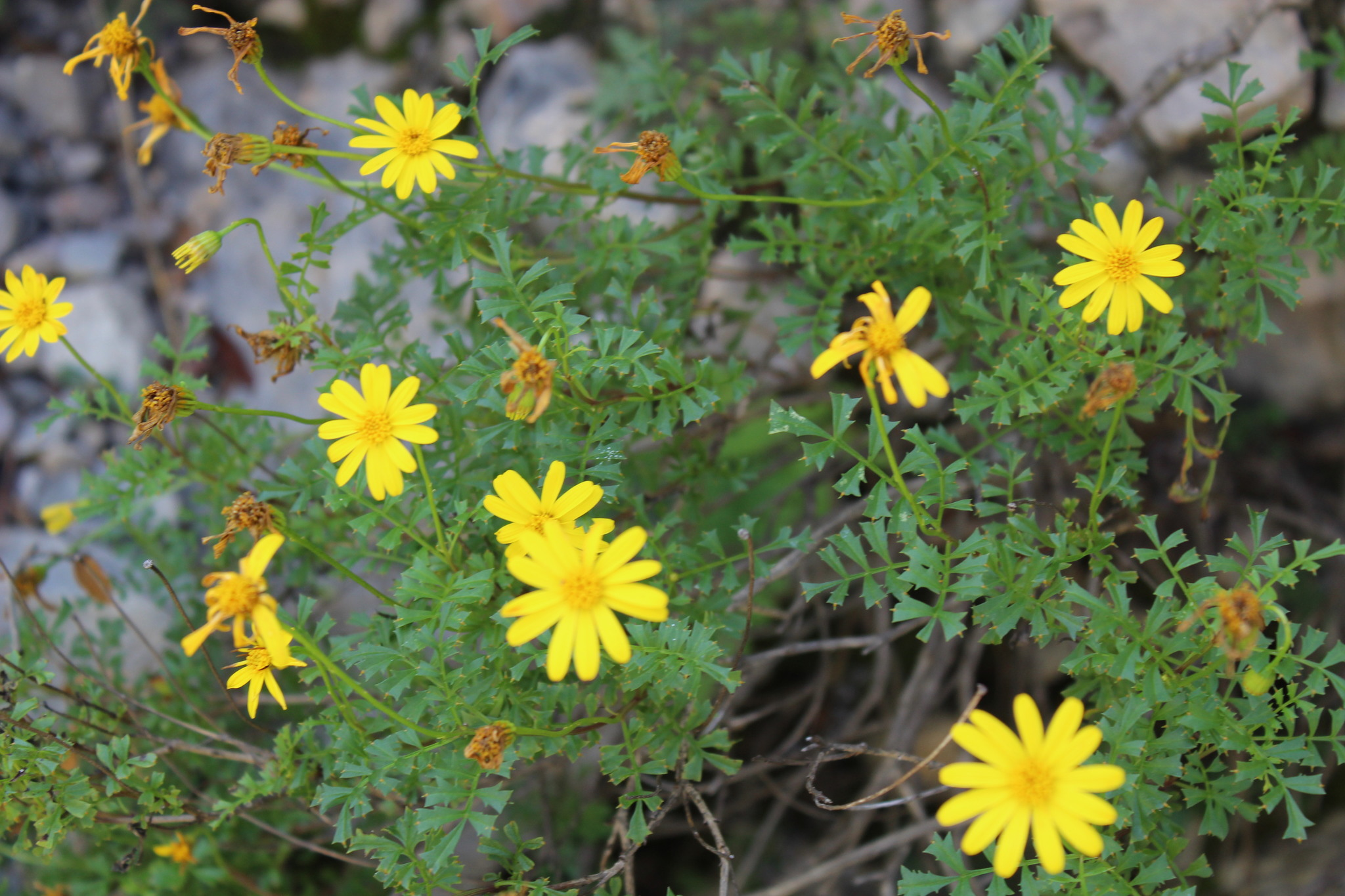

Scientific classification
- Kingdom: Plantae
- Clade: Tracheophytes
- Clade: Angiosperms
- Clade: Eudicots
- Clade: Asterids
- Order: Asterales
- Family: Asteraceae
- Genus: Chrysactinia
- Species: C. truncata

Binomial name
- Chrysactinia truncata S.Wats.

= Chrysactinia truncata =

Species of flowering plant native to Mexico

Chrysactinia truncata is a Mexican species of flowering plants in the family Asteraceae. It is native to northeastern Mexico, the states of Coahuila, Nuevo León, Zacatecas, San Luis Potosí, and Tamaulipas.

Chrysactinia truncata is a shrub up to 30 cm (12 inches) tall. Leaves are narrowly triangular, with the widest part at the tip. Flower heads have yellow ray flowers and yellow disc flowers. Achenes are black. The species grows in forests and chaparral brushlands.
