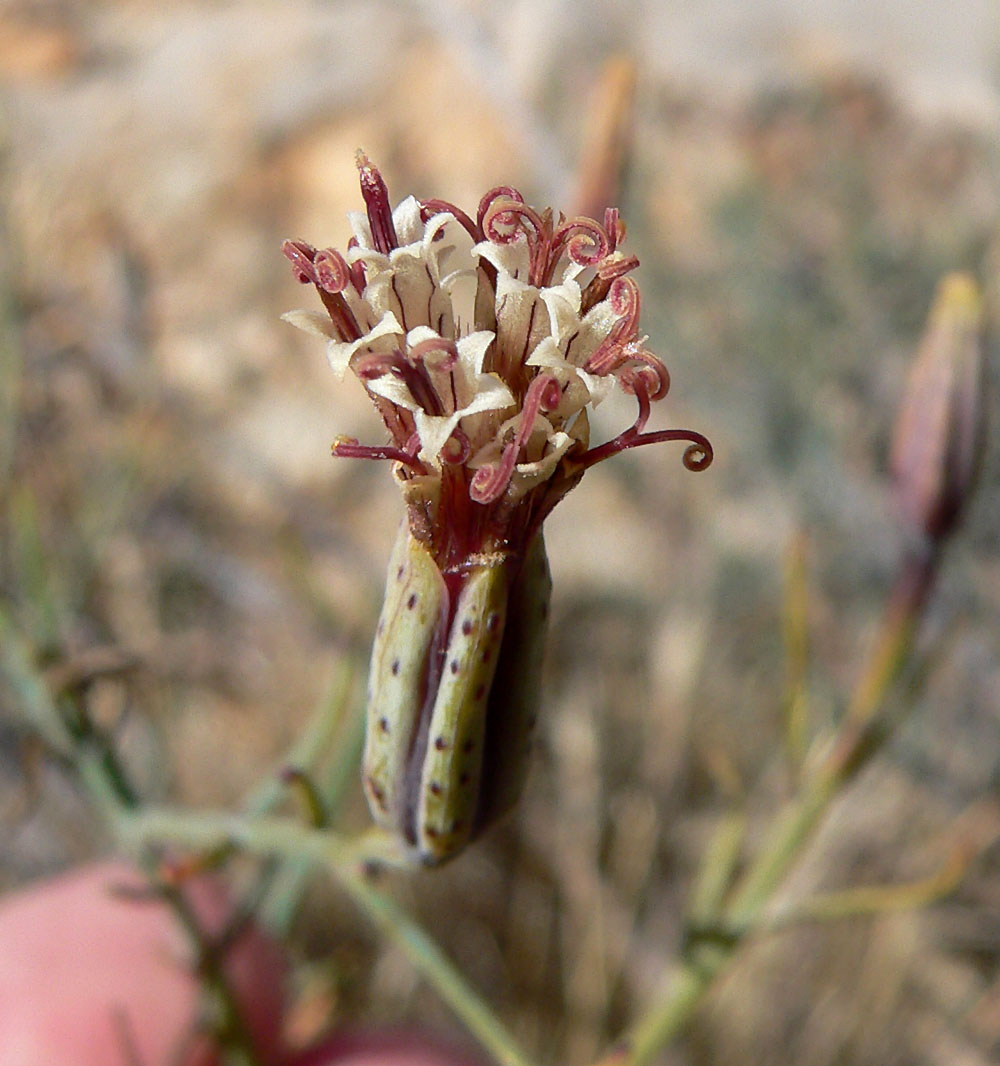

Scientific classification
- Kingdom: Plantae
- Clade: Tracheophytes
- Clade: Angiosperms
- Clade: Eudicots
- Clade: Asterids
- Order: Asterales
- Family: Asteraceae
- Genus: Porophyllum
- Species: P. gracile

Binomial name
- Porophyllum gracile Benth.

Synonyms
- Porophyllum caesium Porophyllum junciforme Porophyllum nodosum Porophyllum putidum Porophyllum vaseyi

= Porophyllum gracile =

Species of plant

Porophyllum gracile is a species of flowering plant in the family Asteraceae known by the common names odora and slender poreleaf. It is native to northern Mexico and the southwestern United States from California to Texas, where it can be found in rocky and sandy desert scrub habitat.

This species grows into a small, short lived perennial shrub with branching slender stems measuring up to about 70 centimeters in maximum length. The stems are hairless and waxy in texture. The sparse waxy leaves are linear in shape and 1 to 5 centimeters in length. The herbage is glandular and aromatic with a strong scent.

Glands located in cavities in the leaves, stems and phyllaries produce several volatile chemicals that act in synergy to repel insect predators.

The inflorescence produces narrow flower heads which may be nearly 3 centimeters long when in bloom. The flower head is enclosed in five waxy, gland-studded phyllaries. It bears 20 to 30 flowers, which are disc florets. Each flower is white or purplish and has a long, curling style protruding from it. The fruit is a cylindrical achene topped with a pappus of bristles, the whole unit measuring over one centimeter long. These plants have many branches with numerous thin, wiry, upright stems.

== Uses ==
- The Seri call this species xtisil and use a tea made from the stems as a remedy for colds and to aid in difficult childbirth. The roots are macerated and used to treat toothache.
- In some Mexican markets fresh and dried material is available for sale as a medicinal. It is commonly called "hierba del venado."

These uses may have scientific validity as many members of the Tageteae tribe contain thiophenes which have proven bactericidal properties.
