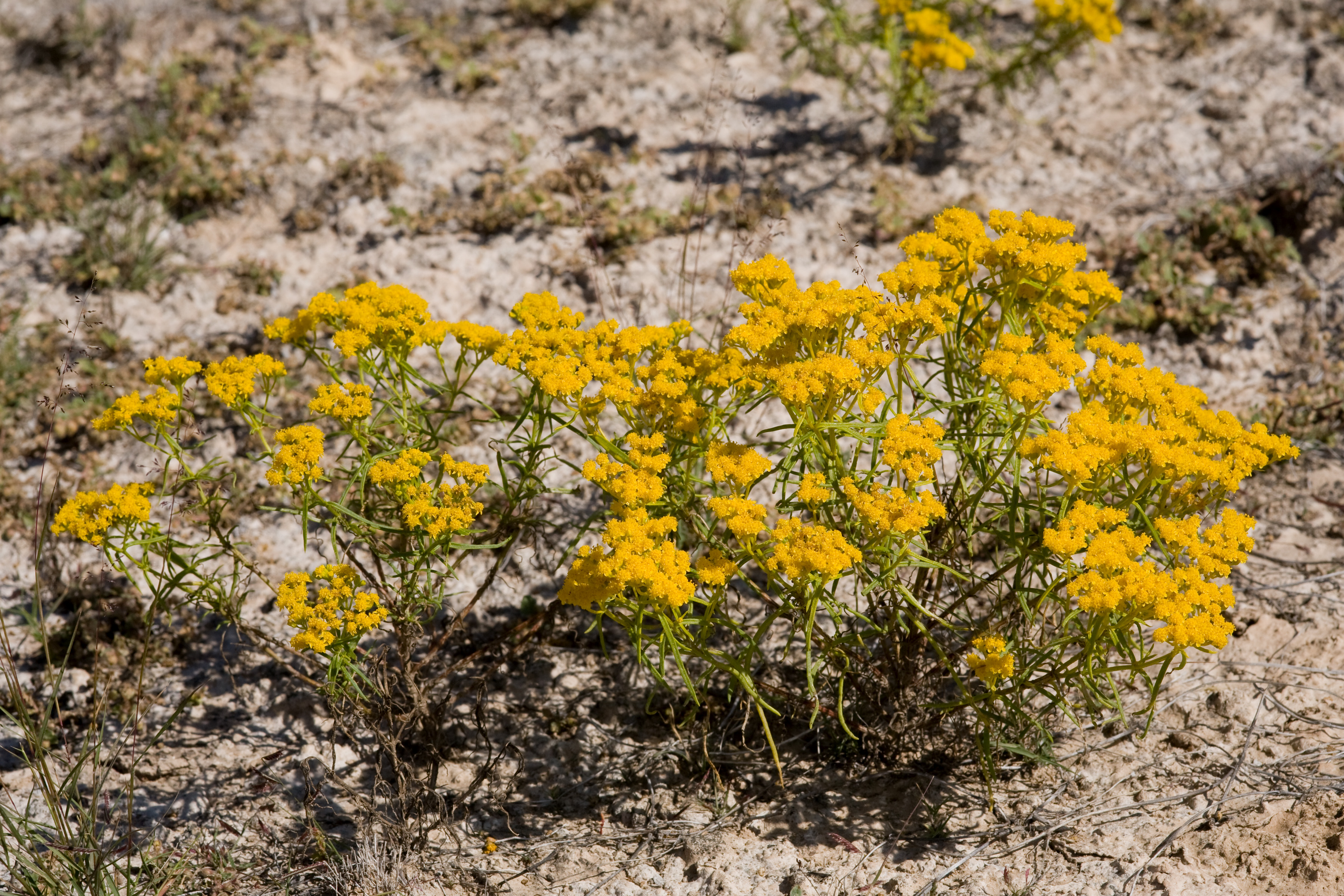
- Sartwellia flaveriae

Scientific classification
- Kingdom: Plantae
- Clade: Tracheophytes
- Clade: Angiosperms
- Clade: Eudicots
- Clade: Asterids
- Order: Asterales
- Family: Asteraceae
- Subfamily: Asteroideae
- Tribe: Tageteae
- Subtribe: Flaveriinae
- Genus: Sartwellia; A.Gray

Type species
- Sartwellia flaveriae A.Gray

= Sartwellia =

Genus of flowering plants

Sartwellia is a genus of North American flowering plants in the tribe Tageteae within the family Asteraceae. The common name is glowwort. The genus was named for American botanist Henry Parker Sartwell.

== Species ==
The following species are recognised:

- Sartwellia flaveriae A.Gray - Chihuahua, New Mexico, western Texas
- Sartwellia gypsophila A.M.Powell & B.L.Turner - Chihuahua
- Sartwellia humilis I.M.Johnst. - Coahuila, Zacatecas, San Luis Potosí
- Sartwellia mexicana A.Gray - Coahuila, Chihuahua, Nuevo León, San Luis Potosí, Sonora
