= Haploesthes robusta =

Scientific classification
- Kingdom: Plantae
- Clade: Tracheophytes
- Clade: Angiosperms
- Clade: Eudicots
- Clade: Asterids
- Order: Asterales
- Family: Asteraceae
- Genus: Haploesthes
- Species: H. robusta

Binomial name
- Haploesthes robusta I.M.Johnst. 1941

Synonyms
- Haploësthes robusta

Species of flowering plant

Haploesthes robusta is a Mexican species of flowering plants in the family Asteraceae. It has been found only in the state of Coahuila in northern Mexico.

The genus name is sometimes spelled Haploësthes, with two dots over the first e to indicate that the o and the e are to be pronounced in separate syllables. This is optional; either spelling is equally acceptable.

Haploesthes robusta grows along stream banks in areas with gypsum soil. It is a sprawling, succulent shrub with stems up to 20 cm (7.9 in) long. Leaves are triangular in cross-section.
