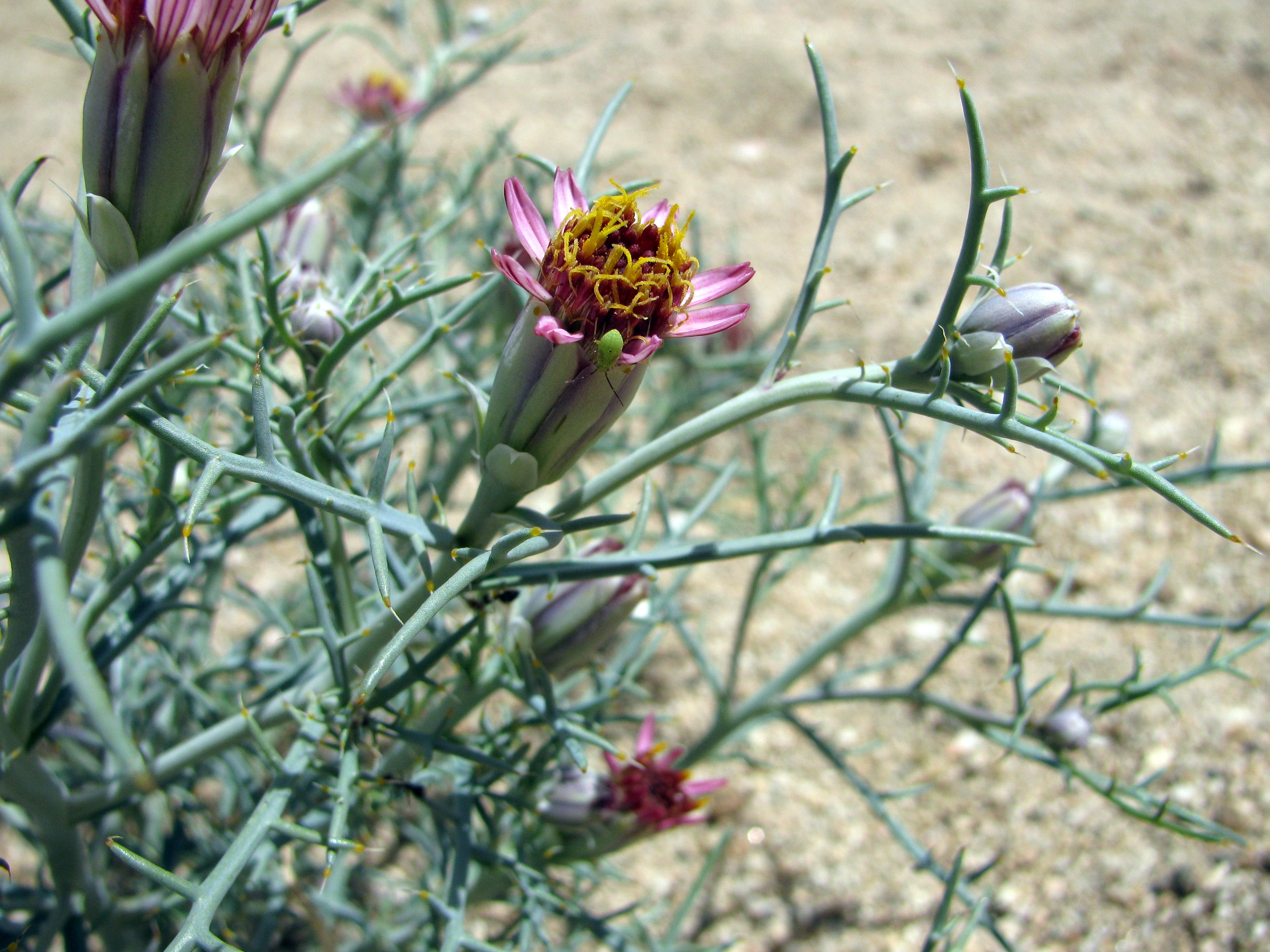
- Nicolletia occidentalis

Scientific classification
- Kingdom: Plantae
- Clade: Tracheophytes
- Clade: Angiosperms
- Clade: Eudicots
- Clade: Asterids
- Order: Asterales
- Family: Asteraceae
- Subfamily: Asteroideae
- Tribe: Tageteae
- Subtribe: Pectidinae
- Genus: Nicolletia; A.Gray

Type species
- Nicolletia occidentalis A.Gray

= Nicolletia =

Genus of flowering plants

Nicolletia, common name hole-in-the-sand plant, is a small genus of flowering plants in tribe Tageteae within the family Asteraceae.

The genus is named for explorer Jean Nicholas Nicollet, 1786–1843.

Species

- Nicolletia edwardsii A.Gray - western Texas, Chihuahua, Coahuila, Durango, Zacatecas
- Nicolletia occidentalis A.Gray - Mojave hole-in-the-sand plant - Baja California, southern California
- Nicolletia trifida Rydb. - Baja California, Baja California Sur
