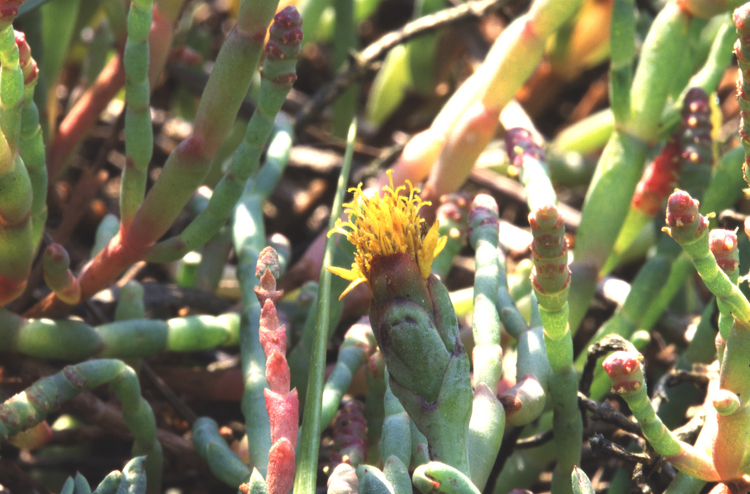

Scientific classification
- Kingdom: Plantae
- Clade: Embryophytes
- Clade: Tracheophytes
- Clade: Angiosperms
- Clade: Eudicots
- Clade: Asterids
- Order: Asterales
- Family: Asteraceae
- Genus: Jaumea
- Species: J. carnosa

Binomial name
- Jaumea carnosa (Less.) Gray 1874

Synonyms
- Coinogyne carnosa Less. 1831

= Jaumea carnosa =

Species of aquatic plant

Jaumea carnosa, known by the common names marsh jaumea, fleshy jaumea, or simply jaumea, is a halophytic salt marsh plant native to the wetlands, coastal sea cliffs and salt marshes of the western coast of North America.

== Description ==
It is a perennial dicotyledon. It has succulent green leaves on soft pinkish-green stems, not unlike ice plant in appearance. Its stems are weak and long. Flowers are yellow and the peduncle is enlarged below the head. It spreads by an extensive rhizome system.

== Distribution ==
Jaumea carnosa ranges from British Columbia to northern Baja California, and can be found in wetlands and salt marshes. Some populations are located on the Channel Islands of California.
