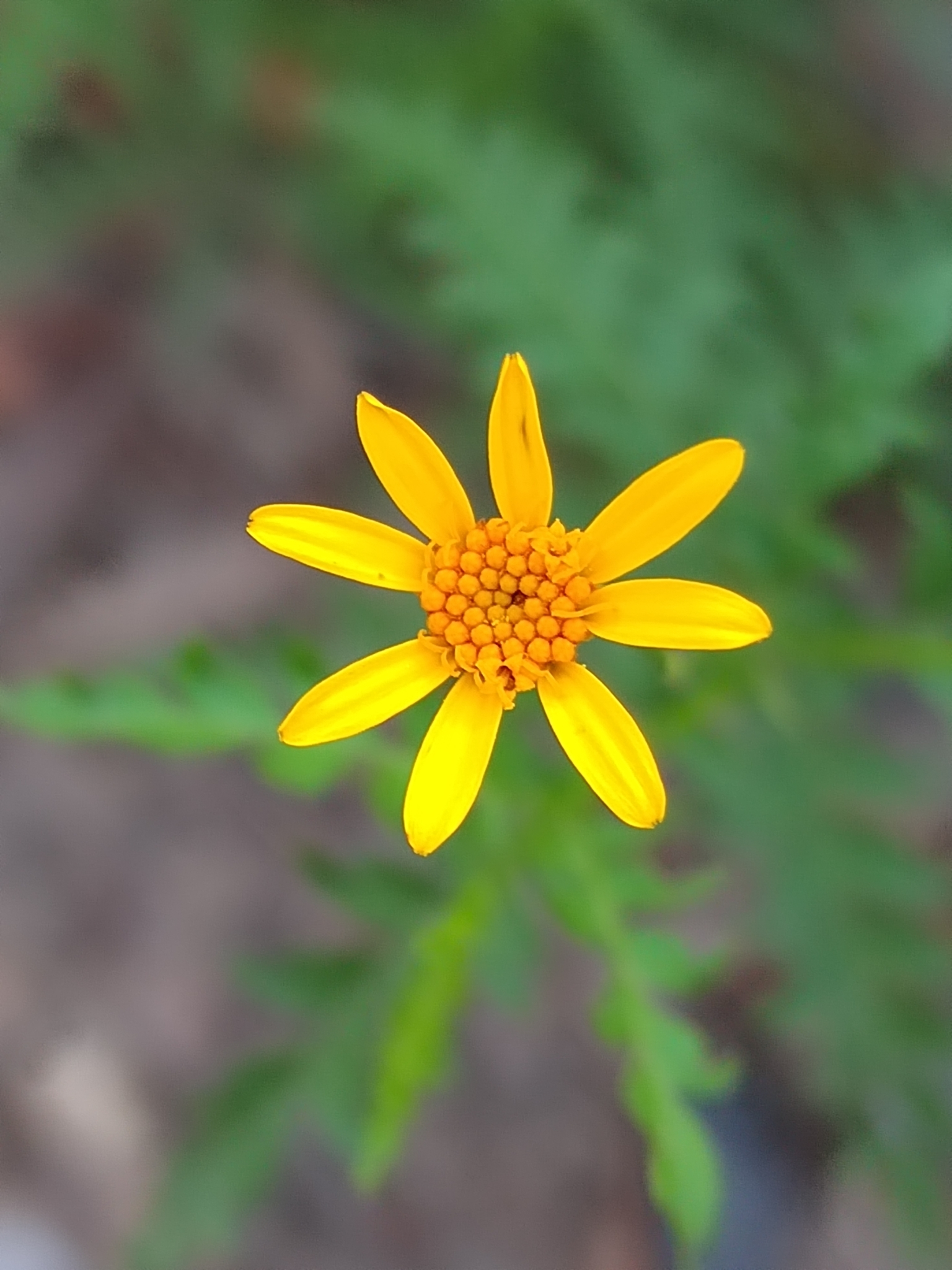

Scientific classification
- Kingdom: Plantae
- Clade: Tracheophytes
- Clade: Angiosperms
- Clade: Eudicots
- Clade: Asterids
- Order: Asterales
- Family: Asteraceae
- Genus: Chrysactinia
- Species: C. pinnata

Binomial name
- Chrysactinia pinnata S.Wats.

= Chrysactinia pinnata =

Species of flowering plant native to Mexico

Chrysactinia pinnata is a Mexican species of flowering plants in the family Asteraceae. It is native to northeastern Mexico, the states of Coahuila, Nuevo León, Querétaro, San Luis Potosí, and Tamaulipas.

This species is a shrub that can grow up to 80 cm (32 inches) tall, with pinnately lobed leaves. Its flower heads feature yellow ray flowers and yellow-orange disc flowers, while the Achenes are black. The species grows in forests and chaparral brushlands.
