= Chrysactinia acerosa =

Scientific classification
- Kingdom: Plantae
- Clade: Tracheophytes
- Clade: Angiosperms
- Clade: Eudicots
- Clade: Asterids
- Order: Asterales
- Family: Asteraceae
- Genus: Chrysactinia
- Species: C. acerosa

Binomial name
- Chrysactinia acerosa S.F.Blake

Species of flowering plant native to Mexico

Chrysactinia acerosa is a Mexican species of flowering plant in the family Asteraceae. It is native to the states of Nuevo León and San Luis Potosí of northeastern Mexico.

Chrysactinia acerosa is a small evergreen subshrub rarely more than 20 cm (8 inches) tall. It is branched, with very narrow, needle-like leaves. Flower heads have yellow ray flowers and yellow disc flowers. Achenes are black. The species grows in dry locations in desert regions.
