= Harnackia =

Scientific classification
- Kingdom: Plantae
- Clade: Embryophytes
- Clade: Tracheophytes
- Clade: Angiosperms
- Clade: Eudicots
- Clade: Asterids
- Order: Asterales
- Family: Asteraceae
- Subfamily: Asteroideae
- Tribe: Tageteae
- Subtribe: Pectidinae
- Genus: Harnackia; Urb.
- Species: H. bisecta

Binomial name
- Harnackia bisecta Urb.

Genus of flowering plants

Harnackia is a genus of flowering plants in the family Asteraceae. It contains only one species, Harnackia bisecta, which is endemic to Cuba.
