= Urbinella =

Scientific classification
- Kingdom: Plantae
- Clade: Tracheophytes
- Clade: Angiosperms
- Clade: Eudicots
- Clade: Asterids
- Order: Asterales
- Family: Asteraceae
- Subfamily: Asteroideae
- Tribe: Tageteae
- Subtribe: Pectidinae
- Genus: Urbinella; Greenm.
- Species: U. palmeri

Binomial name
- Urbinella palmeri Greenm.

Synonyms
- Dyssodia palmeri (Greenm.) J.F.Macbr.

Genus of flowering plants

Urbinella is a genus of flowering plants in the family Asteraceae. It was first published in Proc. American Academy Arts 39: 117 (1903).

The genus is named in honor of Dr. Manuel Urbina, at one time Director of the National Museum in the Mexican capital.

Species

There is only one known species, Urbinella palmeri, found only in the state of Durango in Mexico.
