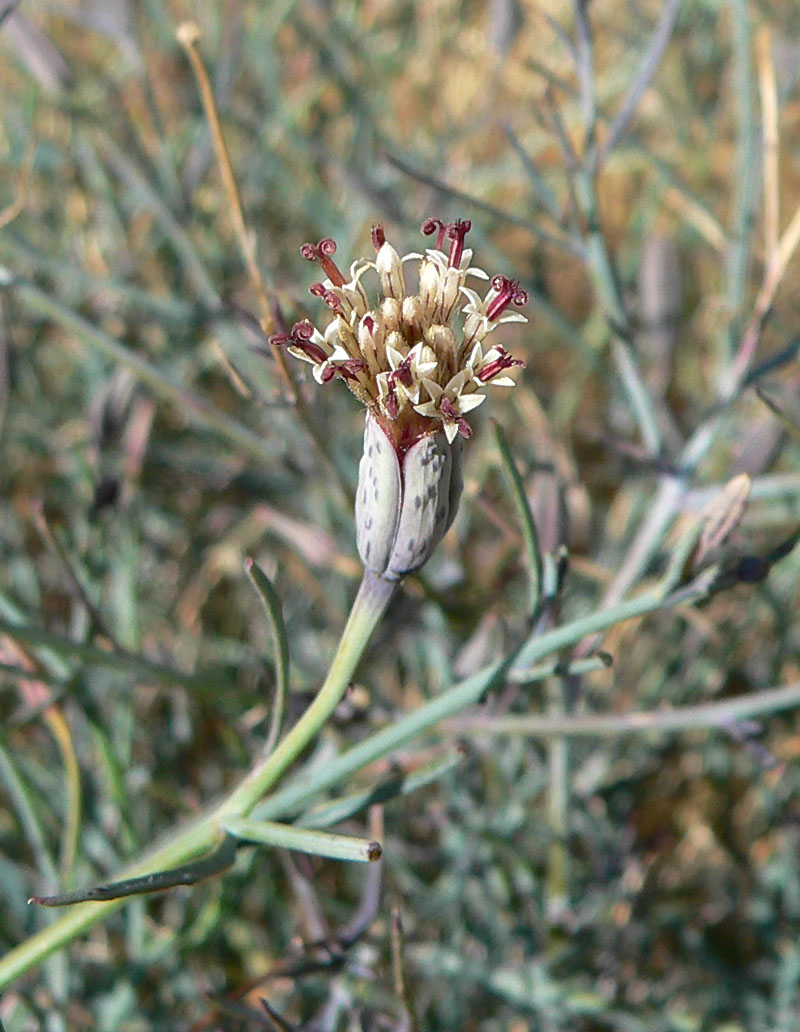
- Porophyllum gracile in southern Nevada

Scientific classification
- Kingdom: Plantae
- Clade: Tracheophytes
- Clade: Angiosperms
- Clade: Eudicots
- Clade: Asterids
- Order: Asterales
- Family: Asteraceae
- Subfamily: Asteroideae
- Tribe: Tageteae
- Subtribe: Pectidinae
- Genus: Porophyllum; Guett. 1754 not Adans. 1763

Synonyms
- Kleinia Jacq.; Hunteria Moc. & Sessé ex DC.

= Porophyllum =

Genus of plants known as poreleaf

Porophyllum is a genus of flowering plants in the tribe Tageteae within the family Asteraceae known commonly as the poreleaf genus.

Poreleaf plants are subshrubs native to the Americas. Their leaves often have large glands that produce aromatic oils and give the plants a strong scent. Many species are used in cooking.

Species

- Porophyllum amplexicaule - Coahuila, Nuevo León
- Porophyllum angustissimum - Brazil, Argentina
- Porophyllum bahiense - Bahia
- Porophyllum cabrerae - Salta in Argentina
- Porophyllum cacalioides - Philippines
- Porophyllum calcicola - Guerrero, Morelos
- Porophyllum coloratum - Mexico
- Porophyllum crassifolium - Baja California Sur
- Porophyllum filiforme - Baja California Sur, Coahuila, Nuevo León, San Luis Potosí
- Porophyllum gracile - odora, slender poreleaf - United States (CA NV UT AZ NM TX), Baja California, Baja California Sur, Sonora, Chihuahua
- Porophyllum greggii - United States (TX), Coahuila, Chihuahua
- Porophyllum hasslerianum - Paraguay
- Porophyllum lanceolatum - Bolivia, Brazil, Paraguay, Argentina
- Porophyllum leiocarpum - yerba de peo - Puerto Rico, Dominican Republic, Venezuela, Brazil
- Porophyllum linaria - pipicha - Mexico
- Porophyllum lindenii - Mexico
- Porophyllum linifolium - Bolivia, Brazil, Paraguay, Argentina
- Porophyllum maritimum - Baja California Sur
- Porophyllum obscurum - Argentina
- Porophyllum oppositifolium - Bolivia, Brazil, Paraguay
- Porophyllum pausodynum - Sonora
- Porophyllum pringlei - Jalisco, México State, Oaxaca, Guerrero, Chiapas, Sinaloa, Morelos, Michoacán
- Porophyllum punctatum - southern Mexico, Central America
- Porophyllum pygmaeum - dwarf poreleaf - United States (NV)
- Porophyllum ruderale - pápalo, Bolivian coriander, quirquiña, yerba porosa - United States (CA AZ NM TX), Mesoamerica, West Indies, South America as far south as Paraguay
- Porophyllum scoparium - Transpecos poreleaf, hierba del venado, jarilla - United States (TX NM), Chihuahua, Coahuila, Nuevo León, San Luis Potosí, Durango, Tamaulipas, Zacatecas
- Porophyllum tridentatum - Baja California Sur
- Porophyllum viridiflorum - México State, Morelos, Michoacán, Guerrero, Oaxaca, Guanajuato, Jalisco
- Porophyllum warnockii - México State
- Porophyllum zimapanum - Hidalgo

formerly included

see Gynura

- Porophyllum japonicum (Thunb.) DC. - Gynura japonica (Thunb.) Juel

== Gallery ==
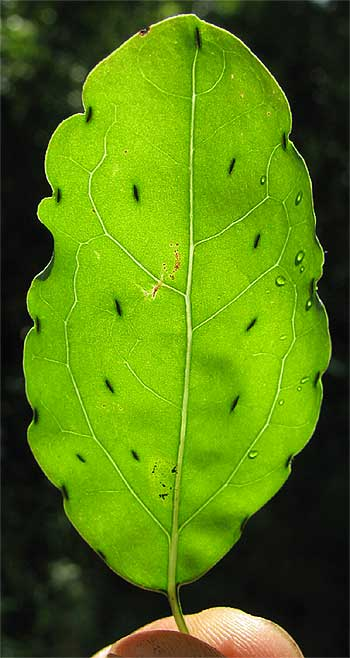
A typical Porophyllum leaf
