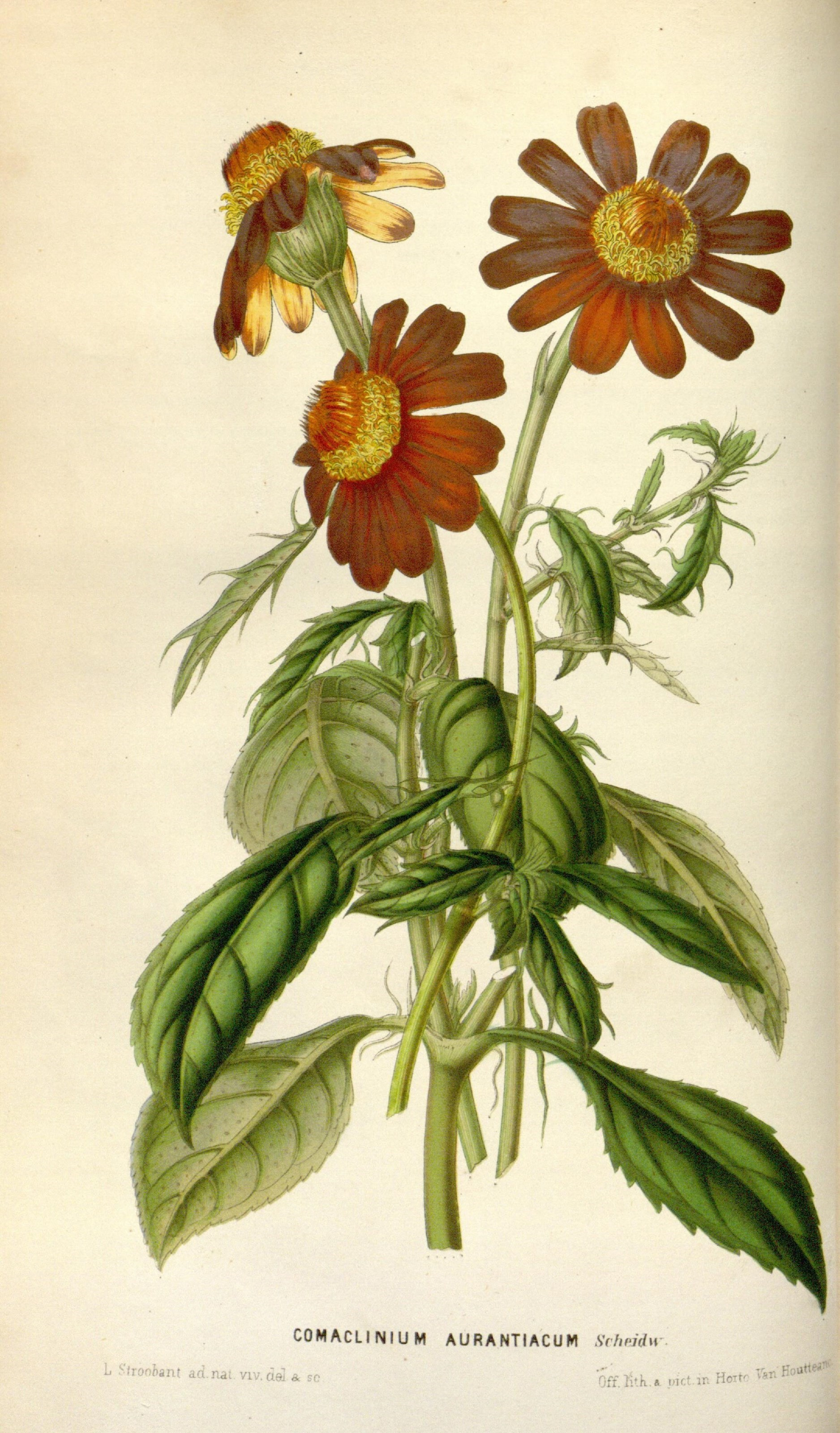

Scientific classification
- Kingdom: Plantae
- Clade: Tracheophytes
- Clade: Angiosperms
- Clade: Eudicots
- Clade: Asterids
- Order: Asterales
- Family: Asteraceae
- Subfamily: Asteroideae
- Tribe: Tageteae
- Subtribe: Pectidinae
- Genus: Comaclinium; Scheidw. & Planch.
- Species: C. montanum

Binomial name
- Comaclinium montanum (Benth.) Strother

Synonyms
- Clomenocoma montana Benth.; Comaclinium aurantiacum Scheidw. & Planch.; Dyssodia integrifolia A.Gray; Gymnolaena integrifolia (A.Gray) Rydb.

= Comaclinium =

Genus of flowering plants

Comaclinium is a genus in the family Asteraceae, described as a genus in 1852.

There is only one known species, Comaclinium montanum, native to Central America and to the State of Chiapas in southern Mexico.
