= Clappia suaedifolia =

Scientific classification
- Kingdom: Plantae
- Clade: Tracheophytes
- Clade: Angiosperms
- Clade: Eudicots
- Clade: Asterids
- Order: Asterales
- Family: Asteraceae
- Subfamily: Asteroideae
- Tribe: Tageteae
- Subtribe: Pectidinae
- Genus: Clappia; A.Gray
- Species: C. suaedifolia

Binomial name
- Clappia suaedifolia A.Gray

Synonyms
- Stanfieldia Small; Haplopappus nealleyi J.M.Coult.; Stanfieldia nealleyi (J.M.Coult.) Small

Species of flowering plant

Clappia suaedifolia, common name fleshy clapdaisy, is the sole species in the North American genus of flowering plants in the family Asteraceae, Clappia.

Clappia suaedifolia is native to Texas and Tamaulipas. It is a succulent, branching shrub or subshrub up to 30 cm (12 inches) tall. Flower heads are yellow, appearing one at a time, with both ray florets and disc florets.

The genus is named for Dr. Asahel Clapp, of New Albany, Indiana.

Annotations on the type specimen of Haplopappus nealleyi in the US National Herbarium, on which the genus Stanfieldia and sole species Stanfieldia nealleyi were also based, suggest that these later names may be synonyms of Clappia suaedifolia.
