= Boeberoides =

Scientific classification
- Kingdom: Plantae
- Clade: Embryophytes
- Clade: Tracheophytes
- Clade: Angiosperms
- Clade: Eudicots
- Clade: Asterids
- Order: Asterales
- Family: Asteraceae
- Subfamily: Asteroideae
- Tribe: Tageteae
- Subtribe: Pectidinae
- Genus: Boeberoides (DC.) Strother
- Species: B. grandiflora

Binomial name
- Boeberoides grandiflora (DC.) Strother

Synonyms
- Dyssodia sect. Boeberoides DC.; Dyssodia grandiflora DC.; Boebera grandiflora Moc. & Sessé ex DC.; Gymnolaena seleri (B.L.Rob. & Greenm.) Rydb.; Clomenocoma grandiflora (DC.) Rydb.; Dyssodia seleri B.L.Rob. & Greenm.

Genus of flowering plants

Boeberoides is a monotypic genus of flowering plants in the family Asteraceae. It contains only one known species, Boeberoides grandiflora. It is endemic to Mexico (states of Guerrero, Morelos, México).
