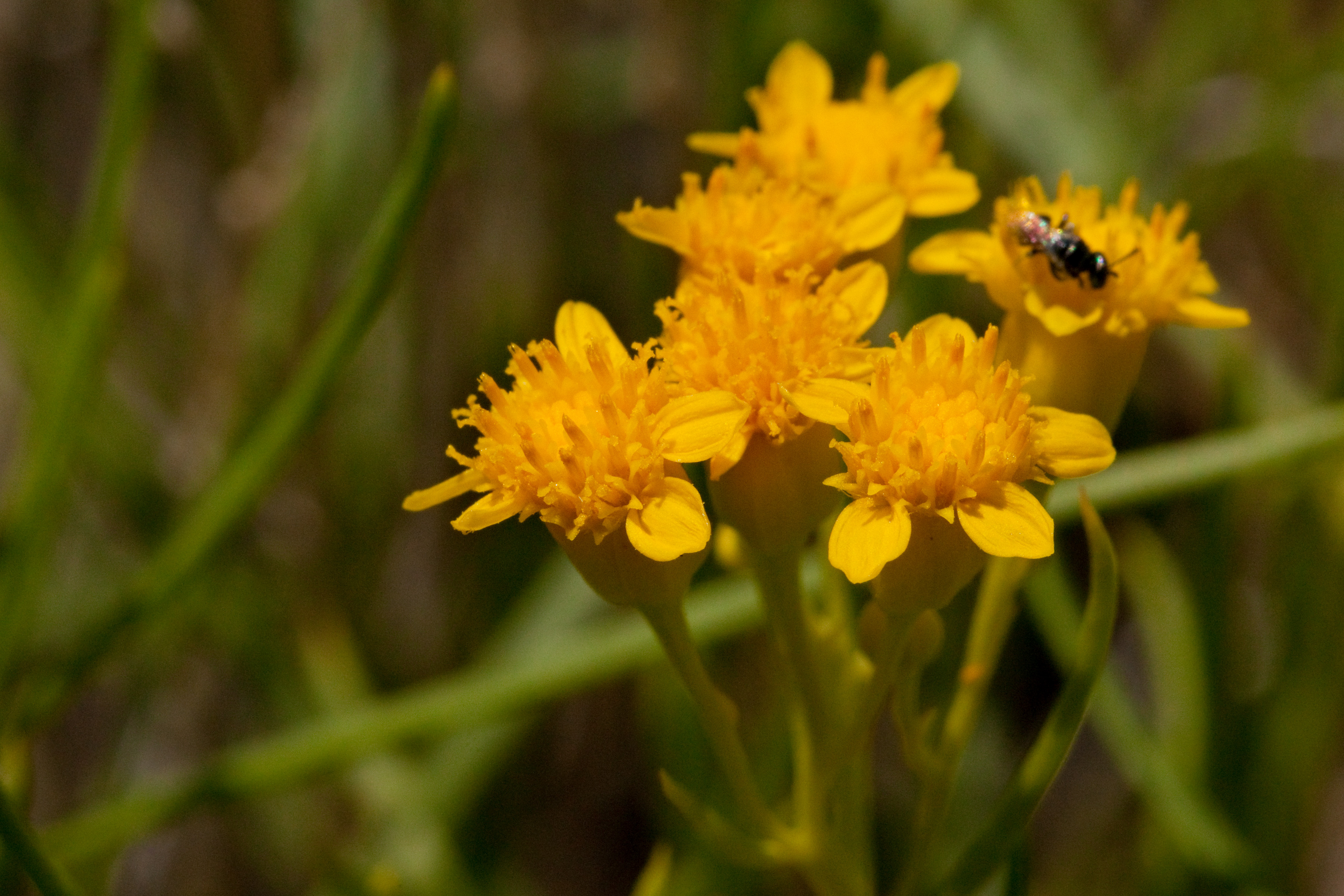
- Haploesthes greggii near Pup Canyon

Conservation status
- Apparently Secure (NatureServe)

Scientific classification
- Kingdom: Plantae
- Clade: Tracheophytes
- Clade: Angiosperms
- Clade: Eudicots
- Clade: Asterids
- Order: Asterales
- Family: Asteraceae
- Genus: Haploesthes
- Species: H. greggii

Binomial name
- Haploesthes greggii A.Gray 1849

Synonyms
- Haploësthes greggii A.Gray, alternate spelling; Haplopappus texanus J.M.Coult., syn of var. texana

= Haploesthes greggii =

Species of flowering plant

Haploesthes greggii, common name false broomweed, is a North American species of flowering plants in the family Asteraceae. It grows in northeastern Mexico (Chihuahua, Coahuila and Nuevo León) and in the south-central and southwestern United States (Texas, Oklahoma, New Mexico; also historical reports of the species in Colorado and Kansas but very likely extirpated there).

The genus name is sometimes spelled Haploësthes, with two dots over the first e to indicate that the o and the e are to be pronounced in separate syllables. This is optional; either spelling is equally acceptable.

Haploesthes greggii is a perennial herb or subshrub up to 80 cm (31 in) tall, somewhat succulent. Leaves are very narrow, sometimes thread-like. The plant produces numerous yellow flower heads in flat-topped arrays. Each head has 3–6 ray flowers and 18-100 disc flowers.

Varieties

- Haploesthes greggii var. greggii
- Haploesthes greggii var. texana (J.M.Coult.) I.M.Johnst.
