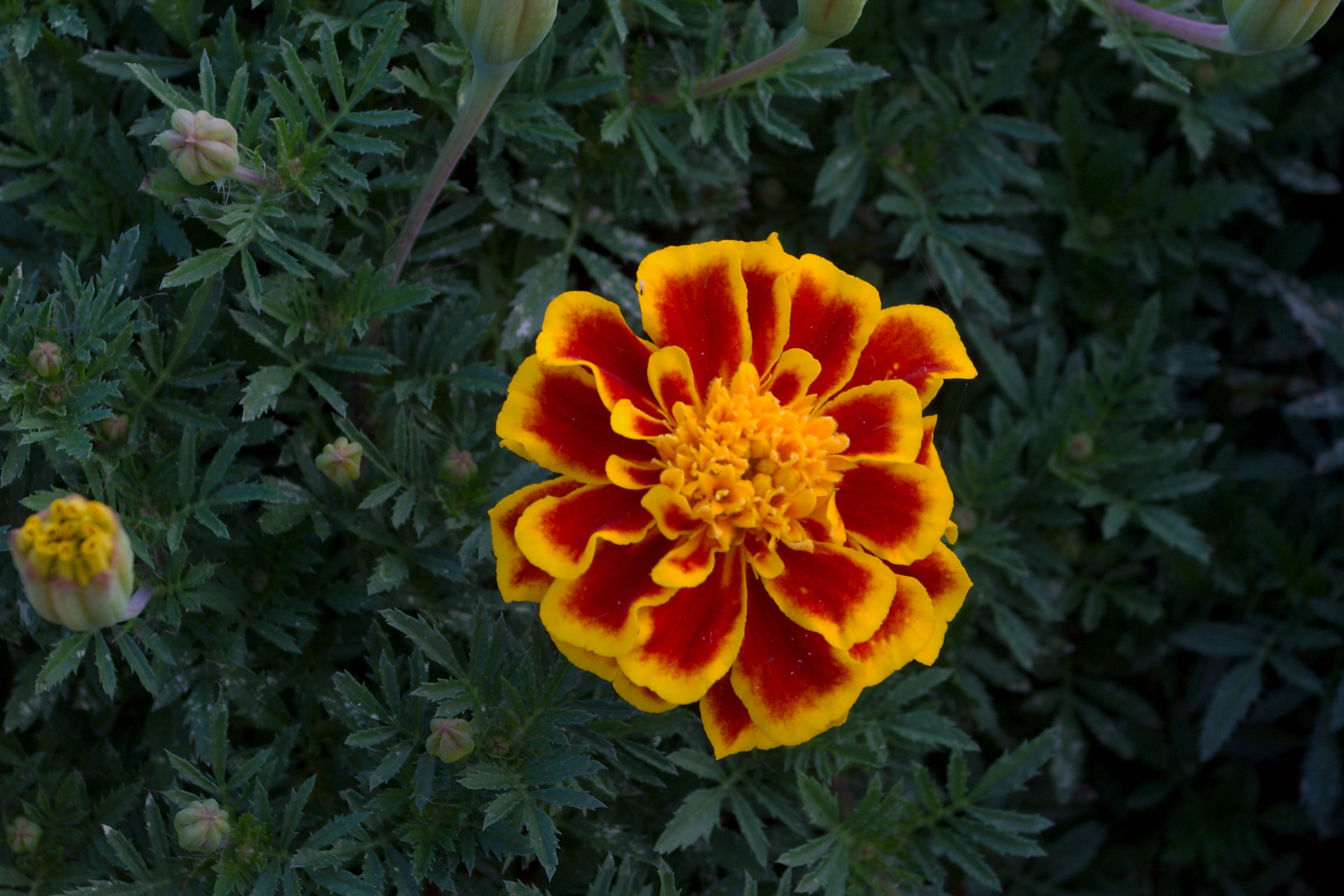
- Tagetes patula

Scientific classification
- Kingdom: Plantae
- Clade: Tracheophytes
- Clade: Angiosperms
- Clade: Eudicots
- Clade: Asterids
- Order: Asterales
- Family: Asteraceae
- Subfamily: Asteroideae
- Tribe: Tageteae; Cass.

Genera
- See text

= Tageteae =

Tribe of flowering plants

Tageteae is a tribe of the plant family Asteraceae. It consists of approximately 260 species divided among 32 genera. All are found in the New World, with a center of diversity in the Mexican highlands. The type genus is Tagetes (marigolds).

Some authors include these plants within a more broadly defined tribe Heliantheae.

== Subtribes and genera ==
Tageteae subtribes and genera recognized by the Global Compositae Database as of April 2022:

- Subtribe Flaveriinae Less.
  - Flaveria Juss.
  - Haploesthes A.Gray
  - Sartwellia A.Gray
- Subtribe Jaumeinae Benth. & Hook.f.
  - Jaumea Pers.
- Subtribe Pectidinae Less.
  - Adenophyllum Pers.
  - Arnicastrum Greenm.
  - Bajacalia Loockerman, B.L.Turner & R.K.Jansen
  - Boeberastrum (A.Gray) Rydb.
  - Boeberoides (DC.) Strother
  - Chrysactinia A.Gray
  - Clappia A.Gray
  - Comaclinium Scheidw. & Planch.
  - Dysodiopsis (A.Gray) Rydb.
  - Dyssodia Cav.
  - Gymnolaena (DC.) Rydb.
  - Harnackia Urb.
  - Hydropectis Rydb.
  - Jamesianthus S.F.Blake & Sherff
  - Lescaillea Griseb.
  - Leucactinia Rydb.
  - Nicolletia A.Gray
  - Oxypappus Benth.
  - Pectis L.
  - Porophyllum Guett.
  - Pseudoclappia Rydb.
  - Schizotrichia Benth.
  - Strotheria B.L.Turner
  - Tagetes L.
  - Thymophylla Lag.
  - Urbinella Greenm.
- Subtribe Varillinae B.L.Turner & A.M.Powell
  - Coulterella Vasey & Rose
  - Varilla A.Gray
