= Per Axel Rydberg =

Swedish-born U.S. botanist (1860–1931)

- Born: July 6, 1860; Odh, Västergötland, Sweden
- Died: July 25, 1931 (aged 71); Bronx County, New York, US
- Citizenship: American
- Education: University of Nebraska; Columbia University
- Scientific career
- Fields: Botany
- Workplaces: New York Botanical Garden
- Author abbrev. (botany): Rydb.

Per Axel Rydberg (July 6, 1860 – July 25, 1931) was a Swedish-born, American botanist who was the first curator of the New York Botanical Garden Herbarium.

== Biography ==
Per Axel Rydberg was born in Odh, Västergötland, Sweden and emigrated to the United States in 1882. From 1884 to 1890, he taught mathematics at Luther Academy in Wahoo, Nebraska, while he studied at the University of Nebraska. He graduated from the University of Nebraska (B.S. in 1891) and (M.A. in 1895). He earned his graduate degree from Columbia University (Ph.D. in 1898).

After he graduated, Rydberg received a commission from the United States Department of Agriculture to undertake a botanical exploration of western Nebraska. He received another one in 1892 to explore the Black Hills of South Dakota, and in 1893 he was in the Sand Hills, again in western Nebraska. During this time he continued to teach at the Luther Academy.

In 1900 Rydberg conducted field work in southeast Colorado. In 1901 he visited Kew Gardens in England and made a return trip to Sweden as well. In 1905 he was collecting in Utah with visits to the University of Wyoming, Los Angeles, and San Francisco. In 1911 he undertook an exploration of southeast Utah and in 1925, the Allegheny Mountains. A trip in 1926 took him to Minnesota, Iowa, Nebraska, Kansas, and the Dakotas. His final field expedition was in 1929 to Kansas and Minnesota but it was cut short due to illness and only included work in Kansas.

He was a prolific research publisher, he described around 1700 new species in the course of his career. His expertise was principally in the flora of the Great Plains and Rocky Mountains. From 1899, Rydberg was on the staff of the New York Botanical Garden, and he later became the first curator of the Garden's Herbarium.

Dr. Rydberg was elected to membership in the Torrey Botanical Club in 1896. In 1900 he joined the American Association for the Advancement of Science and was elected a fellow the following year. Also that year, he was chosen as an Associate of the Botanical Society of America. In 1907 he became a member of the American Geographical Society and the Ecological Society of America.

== Personal life ==
Rydberg married Alfrida Amanda Rydberg, the daughter of one of his cousins, on 11 November 1903 in Mount Vernon, New York. Together they had four children, one son and three daughters. The first, Arthur Alfred Rydberg was born 21 October 1904. He was followed by Elsa Margreta on 13 May 1906, Lilly Irene on 26 December 1908, and finally Linnea Astrial on 13 May 1911. Rydberg's health declined for many months before his death, but he continued to work on the proofs of his final book until the day before his death on 25 July 1931 in New York City.

== Selected works ==
- 1895: Flora Of The Sand Hills Of Nebraska
- 1897: A Report Upon the Grasses and Forage Plants of the Rocky Mountain Region with C. L. Shear
- 1898: A Monograph of the North American Potentilleae
- 1900: Catalogue of the Flora of Montana and the Yellowstone National Park
- 1906: Flora of Colorado
- 1917: Flora of the Rocky Mountains and adjacent plains, Colorado, Utah, Wyoming, Idaho, Montana, Saskatchewan, Alberta, and neighboring parts of Nebraska, South Dakota, and British Columbia
- 1922: Flora of the Rocky Mountains and adjacent plains, Colorado, Utah, Wyoming, Idaho, Montana, Saskatchewan, Alberta, and neighboring parts of Nebraska, South Dakota, North Dakota, and British Columbia
- 1918: Monograph on Rosa
- 1923: Flora of the Black Hills of South Dakota
- 1923: Memories from the Department of Botany of Columbia University
- 1932: Flora of the Prairies and Plains of Central North America with M. A. Howe

== Other works ==
- 1901: Contributions to the botany of the Yukon Territory, (with Nathaniel Lord Britton, Marshall A. Howe, Lucien Marcus Underwood, and R. S. Williams)
- 1903: Flora of the southeastern United States;being descriptions of the seed-plants, ferns and fern-allies growing naturally in North Carolina, South Carolina, Georgia, Florida, Tennessee, Alabama, Mississippi, Arkansas, Louisiana and the Indian territory and in Oklahoma and Texas east of the one-hundredth meridian,(with John Kunkel Small)
- 1919: Key to the Rocky Mountain flora; Colorado, Utah, Wyoming, Idaho, Montana, Saskatchewan, Alberta, and parts of Nebraska, South Dakota, North Dakota, and British Columbia.
- 1899-1913: Studies on Rocky Mountain flora. (Series: Contributions from the New York Botanical Garden)

== Other sources ==
- Tiehm, Arnold; Frans Antonie Stafleu (1990) Per Axel Rydberg : a biography, bibliography, and list of his taxa (Bronx, N.Y.: New York Botanical Garden) ISBN 9780893273514

== Related reading ==
Benson, Adolph B.; Naboth Hedin (1969) Swedes In America (New York: Haskel House Publishers)
