= Intrastate region =

Collection of Mexican municipalities grouped together for statistical purposes

The intrastate regions (Spanish: regiones), and sometimes districts (Spanish: distritos) are collections of municipalities in a Mexican state that are grouped together to support the administration of the state government and are not regulated by the Constitution of Mexico. The reasons for such a grouping include simplicity of administration and keeping statistics, politics, as well as geographic relationship (such as being part of a particular valley.)

== Overview ==
Intrastate regions exist in the following 11 states:

- Chiapas groups its 124 municipalities into 15 economic regions.
- Guerrero groups its 81 municipalities into 7 economic regions.
- Hidalgo groups its 84 municipalities in 3 ways, into 26 micro regions, 14 operational regions, or 5 macro regions.
- Jalisco groups its 125 municipalities into 12 regions.
- México groups its 125 municipalities into 20 regions.
- Michoacán groups its 113 municipalities into 10 regions.
- Oaxaca groups its 570 municipalities into 30 districts, and then into 8 regions.
- San Luis Potosí groups its 58 municipalities into 4 regions.
- Tabasco groups its 17 municipalities in 2 ways, into 4 subregions, or 2 regions.
- Veracruz groups its 212 municipalities into 10 regions.
- Yucatán groups its 106 municipalities into 7 regions.

== Chiapas ==
Chiapas groups its 124 municipalities into 15 economic regions.

| Code | Region | Municipalities |
|---|---|---|
| I | Metropolitana | 4 |
| II | Valles Zoque | 4 |
| III | Mezcalapa | 9 |
| IV | De los Llanos | 8 |
| V | Altos Tsotsil-Tseltal | 17 |
| VI | La Frailesca | 7 |
| VII | De Los Bosques | 13 |
| VIII | Norte | 11 |
| IX | Istmo-Costa | 4 |
| X | Soconusco | 15 |
| XI | Sierra Mariscal | 12 |
| XII | Selva Lacandona | 2 |
| XIII | Maya | 5 |
| XIV | Tulijá Tseltal-Chol | 7 |
| XV | Meseta Comiteca Tojolabal | 7 |

== Jalisco ==
Jalisco groups its 125 municipalities into 12 regions.

| Code | Region | | Municipalities |
|---|---|---|---|
| 01 | Norte | North | 10 |
| 02 | Altos Norte | Highlands North | 8 |
| 03 | Altos Sur | Highlands South | 12 |
| 04 | Ciénega | Swamp | 9 |
| 05 | Sureste | Southeast | 10 |
| 06 | Sur | South | 12 |
| 07 | Sierra de Amula | Amula mountain | 14 |
| 08 | Costa Sur | Coast South | 6 |
| 09 | Costa-Sierra Occidental | Coast-Western Mountain | 8 |
| 10 | Valles | Valleys | 12 |
| 11 | Lagunas | Lagoons | 12 |
| 12 | Centro | Central | 12 |

== México ==
The State of Mexico groups its 125 municipalities into 20 regions, and they are numbered by Roman numerals.

| Code | Region | Municipalities |
|---|---|---|
| I | Amecameca | 13 |
| II | Atlacomulco | 14 |
| III | Chimalhuacán | 4 |
| IV | Cuautitlán Izcalli | 3 |
| V | Ecatepec | 2 |
| VI | Ixtlahuaca | 6 |
| VII | Lerma | 7 |
| VIII | Metepec | 4 |
| IX | Naucalpan | 5 |
| X | Nezahualcóyotl | 1 |
| XI | Otumba | 10 |
| XII | Tejupilco | 11 |
| XIII | Tenancingo | 10 |
| XIV | Tepotzotlán | 7 |
| XV | Texcoco | 4 |
| XVI | Tlalnepantla | 1 |
| XVII | Toluca | 2 |
| XVIII | Texcoco | 4 |
| XIX | Valle de Bravo | 12 |
| XX | Zumpango | 5 |

== Oaxaca ==
Oaxaca groups its 570 municipalities into 30 districts, and then into 8 regions.

| Region | District | Municipalities | |
|---|---|---|---|
| Costa | Jamiltepec | 24 | 50 |
| Costa | Juquila | 12 | 50 |
| Costa | Pochutla | 14 | 50 |
| Istmo | Juchitán | 22 | 41 |
| Istmo | Tehuantepec | 19 | 41 |
| Mixteca | Coixtlahuaca | 13 | 155 |
| Mixteca | Huajuapan | 28 | 155 |
| Mixteca | Juxtlahuaca | 7 | 155 |
| Mixteca | Nochixtlán | 32 | 155 |
| Mixteca | Silacayoapam | 19 | 155 |
| Mixteca | Teposcolula | 21 | 155 |
| Mixteca | Tlaxiaco | 35 | 155 |
| Sierra de Flores Magón | Cuicatlán | 20 | 45 |
| Sierra de Flores Magón | Teotitlán | 25 | 45 |
| Sierra de Juárez | Ixtlán | 26 | 68 |
| Sierra de Juárez | Mixe | 17 | 68 |
| Sierra de Juárez | Villa Alta | 25 | 68 |
| Sierra Sur | Miahuatlán | 32 | 70 |
| Sierra Sur | Putla | 10 | 70 |
| Sierra Sur | Sola de Vega | 16 | 70 |
| Sierra Sur | Yautepec | 12 | 70 |
| Papaloapan | Choapam | 6 | 20 |
| Papaloapan | Tuxtepec | 14 | 20 |
| Valles Centrales | Centro | 21 | 121 |
| Valles Centrales | Ejutla | 13 | 121 |
| Valles Centrales | Etla | 23 | 121 |
| Valles Centrales | Ocotlán | 20 | 121 |
| Valles Centrales | Tlacolula | 25 | 121 |
| Valles Centrales | Zaachila | 6 | 121 |
| Valles Centrales | Zimatlán | 13 | 121 |

== Veracruz ==
Veracruz groups its 212 municipalities into 10 regions.

| Region | Municipalities |
|---|---|
| Huasteca Alta | 15 |
| Huasteca Baja | 18 |
| Totonaca | 15 |
| Nautla | 11 |
| Capital | 33 |
| Mountains | 57 |
| Sotavento | 12 |
| Papaloapan | 22 |
| Los Tuxtlas | 4 |
| Olmeca | 25 |

== Yucatán ==
Yucatán groups its 106 municipalities into 7 regions.

| Code | Region | | Municipalities |
|---|---|---|---|
| I | Poniente | West | 10 |
| II | Noroeste | Northwest | 19 |
| II | Centro | Central | 15 |
| IV | Litoral centro | Littoral central | 16 |
| V | Noreste | Northesst | 9 |
| VI | Oriente | East | 20 |
| VII | Sur | South | 17 |

== See also ==
- Administrative divisions of Mexico
- List of states of Mexico
- Municipalities of Mexico
