= Santa María Rayón =

- Municipal Seat
- Location within State of Mexico
- Coordinates: 19°8′53″N 99°34′48″W
- Country: Mexico
- State: Mexico
- Municipality: Rayón
- Elevation: 2,596 m (8,517 ft)

Population (2010)
  - Total: 8,590
- Time zone: UTC-6 (Central Standard Time)
- INEGI code: 15072

Santa María Rayón is a town and the municipal seat of the Rayón Municipality, State of Mexico in Mexico.
