= Toluca (disambiguation) =

Toluca is a city in Mexico.

Toluca may also refer to:

== Places ==
=== Mexico ===
- Toluca Region, an intrastate region within the State of Mexico
- Toluca Valley, the valley where Toluca is located
- Municipality of Toluca, a municipality located in the State of Mexico; see Greater Toluca
  - Toluca International Airport
  - Toluca Centro railway station
- Roman Catholic Archdiocese of Toluca
- Toluca FC
- Toluca FC (women)

=== United States ===
- Toluca, Illinois, a city
- Toluca, North Carolina, an unincorporated community
- Toluca Lake, neighborhood in Los Angeles, California
- Toluca, the original name of North Hollywood, Los Angeles, California

== Other uses ==
- Toluca (meteorite), an iron meteorite found near Toluca
