= Rayón, State of Mexico =

Rayón
- Municipality
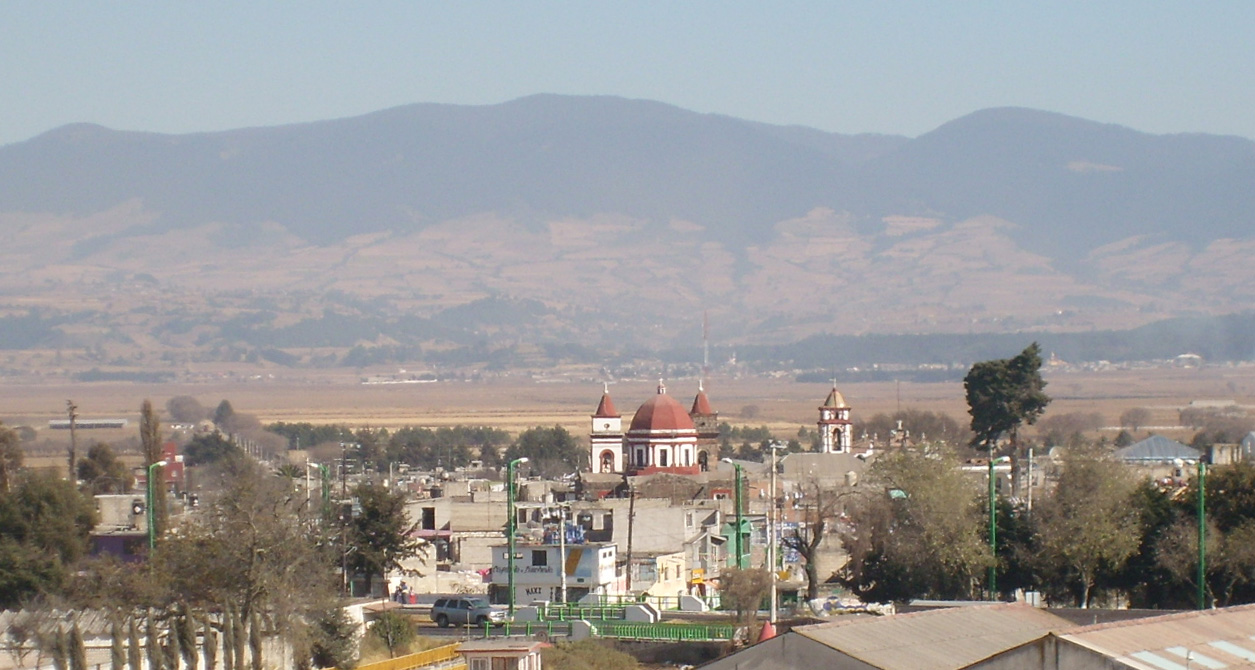

- Coat of arms

- Location of the municipality in Mexico State
- Country: Mexico
- State: Mexico (state)

Government
  - Municipal president: José Luis Robles Vázquez
- Elevation: 2,570 m (8,430 ft)

Population (2005)
  - Total: 12,748
- Time zone: UTC-6 (Central Standard Time)

Rayón is a municipality located in Toluca Region, the northeastern part of the state of Mexico in Mexico, the municipal seat is Santa María Rayón, formerly named Cuauhtenco. The municipality is located at a southern pass leading out of the Toluca Valley.

== Geography ==
The total municipality extends 84.37 km^{2} and borders with the municipalities of Tenango del Valle, Calimaya and Almoloya del Río.

== Communication and transport ==
The Lerma-Tenango Highway, is a main highway that cross by Rayón, connect with Toluca to Tenango del Valle.

== Politics ==
Mayor	Time
Elias Arturo Sánchez Montes de Oca	2009–2012
Erick Vladimir Cedillo Hinojosa	2012–2015
José Luis Robles Vázquez	2016– 2019

== Economy ==
The economy is principally farming, cattle raising and small businesses, concentrating on the production of corn, beans and fruit.

== Demography ==
=== Populated places in Rayón ===
Town	Population
Total	12,748
Santa María Rayón	

== Culture ==
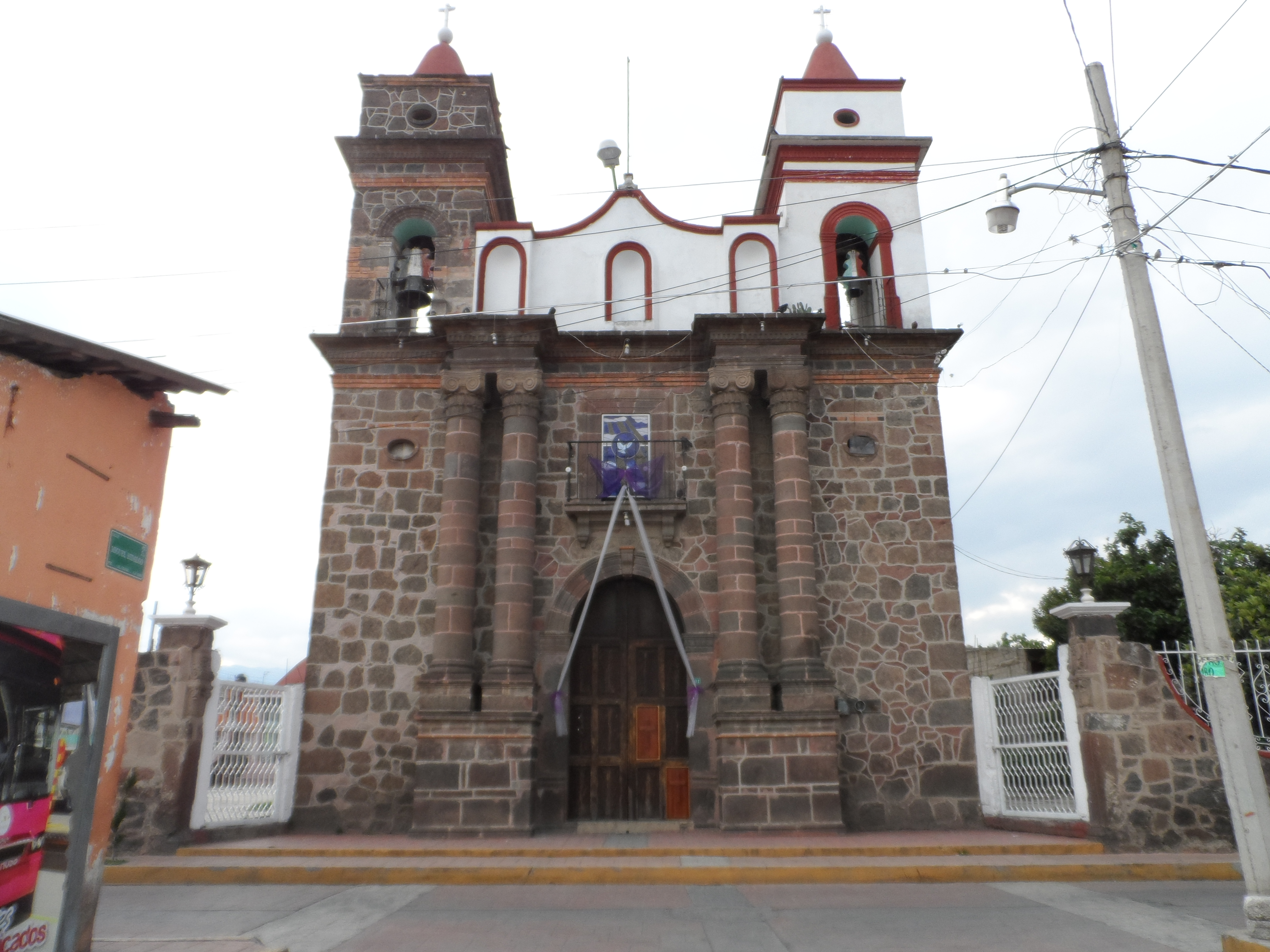
Guadalupe Church in Rayón.

=== Monuments ===
- Saint Mary of Guadalupe Parish is a monument in Rayón town.
