= Tejupilco Region =

Region X (Spanish: Región X. Tejupilco) is a Mexican intrastate region within the State of Mexico, one of 16. It borders the states of Guerrero and Michoacán in the southwest corner of the state. The region comprises four municipalities: Amatepec, Luvianos, Tejupilco, Tlatlaya. It is largely rural.

| Municipality | Area (km²) 2010 | Population 2005 Census | Population 2010 Census | Population density (/km² 2010) |
|---|---|---|---|---|
| Amatepec | 624.9 | 27,026 | 26,334 | 42.1 |
| Luvianos | 702.2 | 28,213 | 27,781 | 39.6 |
| Tejupilco | 669.1 | 62,547 | 71,077 | 113.7 |
| Tlatlaya | 798.9 | 33,308 | 32,997 | 41.3 |
| Region X Tejupilco | 2795.1 | 151,094 | 158,169 | 56.5 |
