= San Francisco Acuautla =

San Francisco Acuautla is located in the eastern part of the Estado de Mexico to 4 kilometers from the county seat of Ixtapaluca; Coatepec bordered on the north, south to the suburbs of Ixtapaluca and Ranch San Andrés, east to the town Manuel Avila Camacho and the suburbs of Tlapacoya Ayotla and finally west to the Magdalena Atlicpa.

It is at 19" 20' latitude and 098" 51' longitude, its grounds are located at 2300 meters above sea level approximately, also belongs to the third quadrant in which Ixtapaluca splits.

== Hydrography ==
It has three main tributaries:

- “El Capulín” o “Azizintla”, that forms in the current Cerro de Santa Cruz or Sabanilla.
- “El Texcalhuey” or “La virgen” in the north..
- “Las jícaras” or “San Francisco” which flows into Lake Texcoco and originates in Capulin Yeloxochitl and hills.

The three go through the villages of the mountainous area across Ixtapaluca and end at the river La compañía.

== Weather ==
Its climate is temperate humid; the temperature varies with the seasons, the average is 15 °C and maximum 39 °C extreme and extreme low of –8 °C below zero.

== Fauna ==
San Francisco wildlife was a wooded area, but the arrival of the development and exploitation of forests have led to the fauna of this region to extinction. The few wild species are deer (although there are few examples), rabbit, ferret, opossum, cacomistle, owl, a variety of snakes, lizards and spiders, also pets such as pigs, chickens, turkeys, rabbits, cows, horses, sheep, goats, quail, and ducks. Some of these animals are bred from pre-Hispanic and colonial times.

== Flora ==
Within the community there are several fruit species as a fig tree, wild cherry, pear, apple, sapodilla, Granada, apricot, hawthorn, walnut and peach, also some herbs like camphor, eucalyptus, pitch pine, peppermint, feverfew, basil, arnica, orange, rue, dandelion, mugwort, rosemary, horehound, chamomile, peppermint, lemongrass, aloe, tepozán, datura, melissa, mullein, and chicalote; edible plants such as pigweed, Montagu, purslane, truck, alfalfa, nopal, ortiguilla, goatee, poor women and maguey (the latter was an industry in the community).

Agriculture is especially based on corn, beans, wheat, barley, tomatoes, squash, among other vegetables and marigold flower temporarily. Finally, note that the individual trees in the region are pirúl and huizache, whose importance goes back to pre-Hispanic times.

San Francisco Acuautla, people of culture, history and tradition, is named after the first settlers, who on reaching the passage between the pre-Hispanic communities Coatepec and Ixtapaluca found a vast territory of great forests and a large amount of water running through the rivers supplying this place.

== Place names ==
So according Olaguibel Acuautla name arose; he tells us that consists of ATL, and Cuauhtla, meaning "forest in the water" or "forest by the water". Needless to say the word no prepositions "in" or "next" due in Nahuatl, and compound names containing the nominative and genitive regime; so if we follow the rule Acuautla translates as "Water Forest"

One of the first buildings Acuautla is the parish in honor of St. Francis of Assisi, which was built in the mid sixteenth century by the Franciscan Order (order evangelized community Acuautla). It consists of one level, the main facade is flattened lime walls are stone with a width of 0.80 m and the cover is stone vault. Originally, the parish began as a chapel and exterior sides had a railing that covered the stairs and the passage of time disappeared. The arc of the parish still retains its original condition and has undergone changes in color issue but still the same.

In the village of St. Francis of Assisi is a historical relic for Acuautla community; its origin is European and was brought by the missionaries in colonial times with the intention of attracting the natives to Catholicism, the image is carved in wood and due to deterioration will have been multiple restorations, which have provided him with some fiberglass layers and gypsum. The image has not lost its original state except for the right hand, which says he was turned face up and holding a book and a skull; possibly in the revolution could have suffered such a change, but it is not confirmed.

The village feast is celebrated on October 4 and a grand procession through the main streets of the town, where large sawdust carpets, accompanied by a lot of locals and visitors alike are placed parishioners and fireworks decorating is done sky people.

== Transport ==
Currently the shuttle is made up trucks and vans combi type the following transportation routes:

- La Virgen–Ixtapaluca
- La virgin–La Paz
- San Francisco–Airoport
- Uprez–Ixtapaluca
- Uprez–La Paz
- La Presa– Ixtapaluca

With a service schedule 4:00 a.m. to 12:00 p.m.
