= Tultitlán Region =

Region I (Spanish: Región 1. Tultitlán) is an intrastate region within the State of Mexico, one of 16. It borders the states of Mexico City in the central corner of the state. The region comprises seven municipalities: Coacalco de Berriozábal, Cuautitlán, Melchor Ocampo, Tultitlán. It is largely rural.

== Municipalities ==
- Coacalco de Berriozábal
- Tultitlán
