= San Buenaventura, Ixtapaluca =

Coordinates: 19.2641°N 99.6746°W

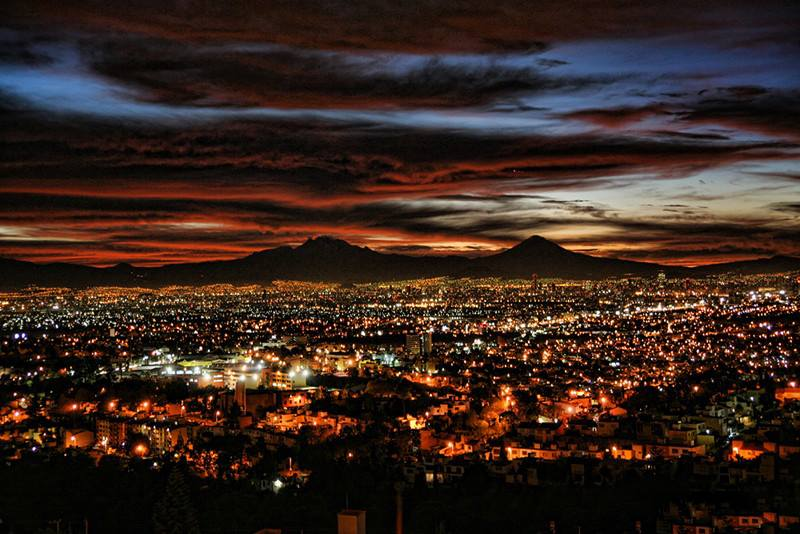
San Buenaventura at night

San Buenaventura is the second-largest community in the municipality of Ixtapaluca in the eastern part of Mexico State, Mexico. In the 2005 INEGI Census, the town reported a population of 48,037 inhabitants.
