= Herminia Albarrán Romero =

Mexican-American artist

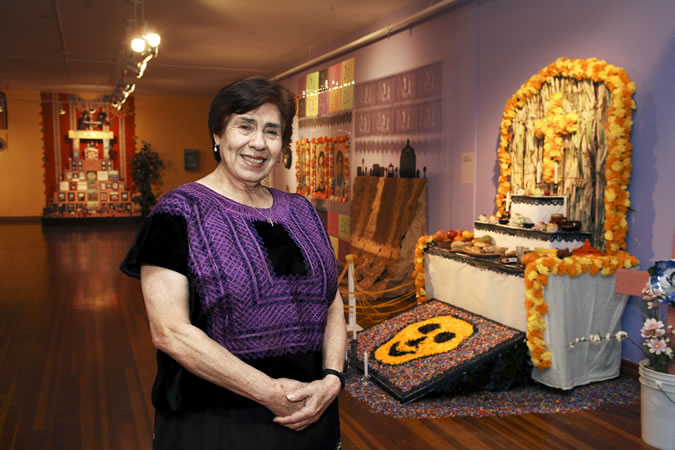
Albarrán Romero in 2005

Herminia Albarrán Romero is a Mexican-American artist known for her papel picado (Mexican paper cutting) and altar-making. She received a National Heritage Fellowship from the National Endowment for the Arts in 2005, which is the United States' highest honor in the folk and traditional arts.

== Early life ==
Born and raised in Tlatlaya, Mexico, Albarrán Romero began learning her skills as a child from her mother. As a young woman she honed her craft with studies at Acatempa in Amatepel.

== Artwork ==
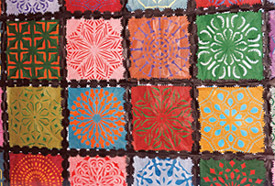
An example of Albarrán Romero's papel picado

She has been commissioned to create works for several notable institutions, including the Oakland Museum of California, the California Palace of the Legion of Honor, and the Mission Cultural Center for Latino Arts. Romero currently resides in San Francisco, California.

Many of her exhibits focus on Dia de los Muertos celebrations, where she creates altars. She states of her work:

In creating my works for Dia de los Muertos, I am joyful as I senses the near presence of my loved ones. When I create papel picado and paper flowers, I again experience those childhood memories near my beloved mother and grandparents who also worked at these crafts. I feel connected to the love they have for me even in death and this is why I feel such a great joy within me.

Albarrán Romero collaborates as an altarista, or altar maker at Day of the Dead workshops across the United States.

== Selected exhibits ==
- Día de los Muertos Honor Altar at Mission Cultural Center for Latino Arts, San Francisco, CA, October–November 2005
- Día de los Muertos Altar at New College of California, San Francisco, CA, October–November 2005
- Día de los Muertos Altar at Palace of the Legion of Honor, San Francisco, CA, Fall 2004
- Virgen de Guadalupe Celebration at Mission Dolores Basilica: Papel picado and large paper roses, San Francisco, CA, December 2003
- Día de los Muertos Altar at Mission Dolores Basilica, San Francisco, CA, 2003
- Día de los Muertos Altar and Papel Picado Decorations for the Mission Cultural Center for Latino Arts, San Francisco, CA, 2003
