= Chimalhuacán Region =

Intrastate region within the State of Mexico, Mexico

Region I (Spanish: Región 1. Chimalhuacán) is an intrastate region within the State of Mexico, one of 16. It borders the states of Puebla in the east corner of the state. The region comprises thirteen municipalities: Chimalhuacán, Chicoloapan, Ixtapaluca, Chalco de Solidaridad. It is largely rural.

== Municipalities ==
- Chicoloapan
- Ixtapaluca
