= Lerma Region =

Region VII (Spanish: Región VII. Lerma) is an intrastate region within the State of Mexico, one of 16. It borders the states of Mexico City and Morelos in the south corner of the state. The region comprises thirteen municipalities: Ocoyoacac, Lerma, Capulhuac, and San Mateo Atenco. It is largely rural.

== Municipalities ==
- Capulhuac
- Lerma
- Otzolotepec
- Ocoyoacac
- San Mateo Atenco
- Temoaya
- Texcalyacac
- Tianguistenco
- Xonacatlán
- Xalatlaco
