= List of Mexican states by population density =

This is a list of Mexican states by population density, based on data from the 2020 National Census. Population density is calculated as the resident population divided by total land area.

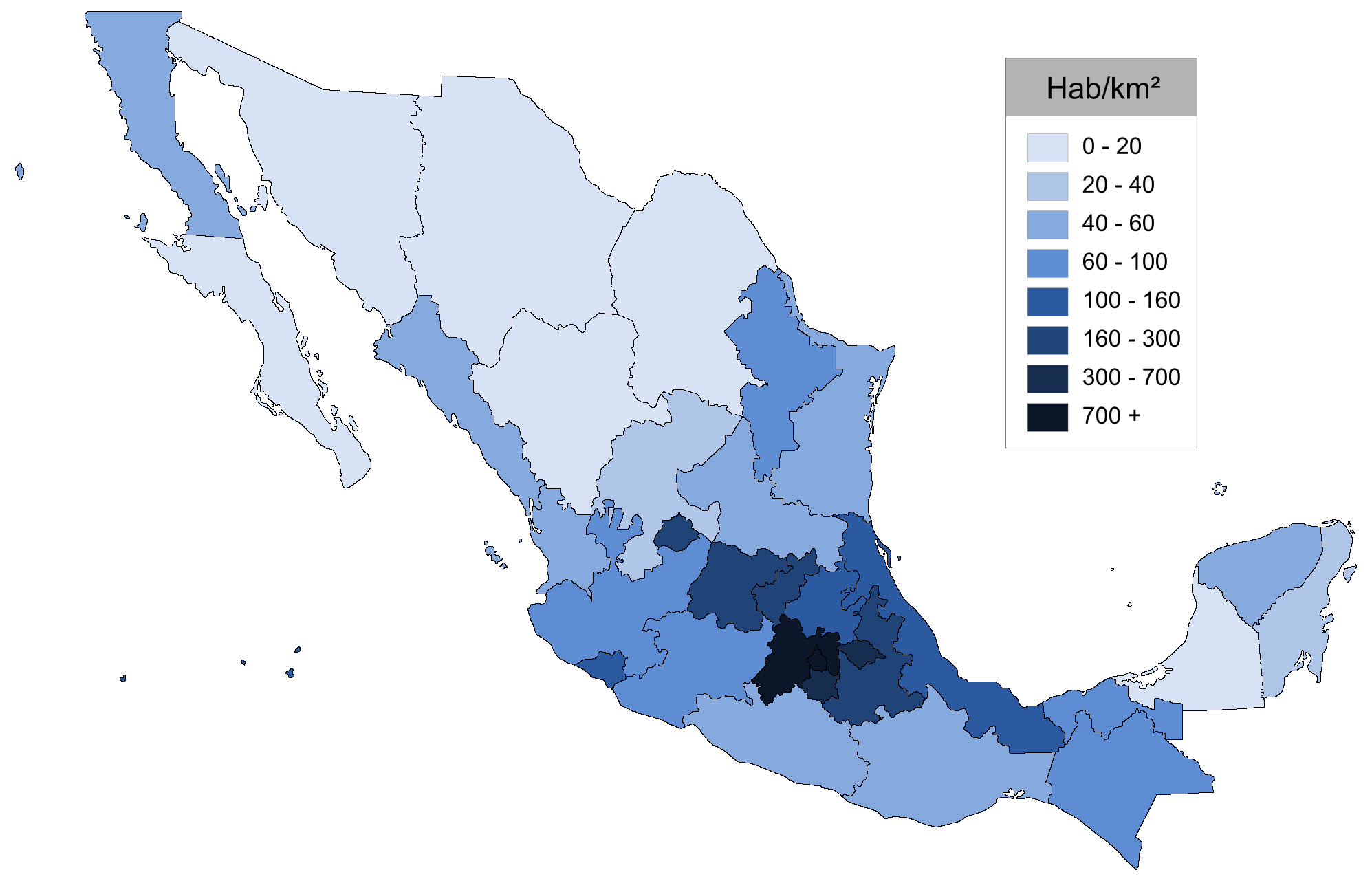
Mexican states by population density, 2012.

Rank	State	Population (2020)	Area (km^{2})	Area (sq mi)	Density
1	Ciudad de México	9,209,944	1,494.3	577.0	6,163.4/km^{2} (15,963.1/sq mi)
2	México	16,992,418	22,351.8	8,630.1	760.2/km^{2} (1,969.0/sq mi)
3	Morelos	1,971,520	4,878.9	1,883.8	404.1/km^{2} (1,046.6/sq mi)
4	Tlaxcala	1,342,977	3,996.6	1,543.1	336.0/km^{2} (870.3/sq mi)
5	Aguascalientes	1,425,607	5,615.7	2,168.2	253.9/km^{2} (657.5/sq mi)
6	Querétaro	2,368,467	11,690.6	4,513.8	202.6/km^{2} (524.7/sq mi)
7	Guanajuato	6,166,934	30,606.7	11,817.3	201.5/km^{2} (521.9/sq mi)
8	Puebla	6,583,278	34,309.6	13,247.0	191.9/km^{2} (497.0/sq mi)
9	Hidalgo	3,082,841	20,821.4	8,039.2	148.1/km^{2} (383.5/sq mi)
10	Colima	731,391	5,626.9	2,172.6	130.0/km^{2} (336.6/sq mi)
11	Veracruz	8,062,579	71,823.5	27,731.2	112.3/km^{2} (290.7/sq mi)
12	Jalisco	8,348,151	78,595.9	30,346.0	106.2/km^{2} (275.1/sq mi)
13	Tabasco	2,402,598	24,730.9	9,548.7	97.1/km^{2} (251.6/sq mi)
14	Nuevo León	5,784,442	64,156.2	24,770.8	90.2/km^{2} (233.5/sq mi)
15	Michoacán	4,748,846	58,598.7	22,625.1	81.0/km^{2} (209.9/sq mi)
16	Chiapas	5,543,828	73,311.0	28,305.5	75.6/km^{2} (195.9/sq mi)
17	Yucatán	2,320,898	39,524.4	15,260.5	58.7/km^{2} (152.1/sq mi)
18	Guerrero	3,540,685	63,595.9	24,554.5	55.7/km^{2} (144.2/sq mi)
19	Sinaloa	3,026,943	57,365.4	22,148.9	52.8/km^{2} (136.7/sq mi)
20	Baja California	3,769,020	71,450.0	27,587.0	52.8/km^{2} (136.6/sq mi)
21	San Luis Potosí	2,822,255	61,138.0	23,605.5	46.2/km^{2} (119.6/sq mi)
22	Nayarit	1,235,456	27,856.5	10,755.5	44.4/km^{2} (114.9/sq mi)
23	Oaxaca	4,132,148	93,757.6	36,200.0	44.1/km^{2} (114.1/sq mi)
24	Tamaulipas	3,527,735	80,249.3	30,984.4	44.0/km^{2} (113.9/sq mi)
25	Quintana Roo	1,857,985	44,705.2	17,260.8	41.6/km^{2} (107.6/sq mi)
26	Zacatecas	1,622,138	75,275.3	29,064.0	21.5/km^{2} (55.8/sq mi)
27	Coahuila	3,146,771	151,594.8	58,531.1	20.8/km^{2} (53.8/sq mi)
28	Sonora	2,944,840	179,354.7	69,249.2	16.4/km^{2} (42.5/sq mi)
29	Campeche	928,363	57,484.9	22,195.0	16.1/km^{2} (41.8/sq mi)
30	Chihuahua	3,741,869	247,412.6	95,526.5	15.1/km^{2} (39.2/sq mi)
31	Durango	1,832,650	123,364.0	47,631.1	14.9/km^{2} (38.5/sq mi)
32	Baja California Sur	798,447	73,909.4	28,536.6	10.8/km^{2} (28.0/sq mi)
Total		126,014,024	1,960,646.7	757,009.9	64.3/km^{2} (166.5/sq mi)
