= Coat of arms of the State of Mexico =

Coat of arms of State of Mexico

The coat of arms of State of Mexico (Spanish: Escudo del estado de México, lit. "state shield of Mexico") is a symbol of the Free and Sovereign State of Mexico.

The coat of arms of the State of Mexico is a representation of a legend of the conquest of New Spain to today.

== Symbolism ==
The coat of arms of the State of Mexico is a national eagle on the top of the Coat of Arms, in accordance with the Law on the Coat of Arms, the Flag and the National Anthem, and the drawing in the upper left quarter representing the Xinantécatl volcano, the Pyramid of the Sun of Teotihuacán and the original toponym of Toluca, the capital of the State of Mexico.

Represented in the second upper right quarter by a cannon of the time, on the place where the Battle of Monte de las Cruces took place, on October 30, 1810.

Represented in the third and fourth quarters, together, below the previous ones, containing the toponym of Mexico, which gave its name to the Homeland and the State; the furrows of agriculture producing corn plants and the open book of knowledge, on it a factory gear, a sickle, a pickaxe, a shovel and a flask, tools of human work. It also contains eighteen bees that represent the number of Judicial Districts of the State.

=== Elements ===
Mexico State was the first state in the country to adopt the national shield, on the crest or upper part of the coat of arms.

== History ==
Although the explanatory statement of the decree of April 9, 1941 states that since its creation the State of Mexico did not have its own coat of arms, it is known that when the Kingdom of Mexico was formed and then the Intendancy of Mexico during the viceroyalty of New Spain, it was used as the coat of arms of these viceregal entities.

=== Historical coats ===
The symbol is used by all successive regimes in the State of Mexico, in different forms.

Coat of arms since 1712 to 1827.

Coat of arms since 1827 to 1833.

Coat of arms since 1833 to 1898.

Coat of arms since 1941 to 1977.

Coat of arms since 1977 to 1995.

== See also ==
- Coat of arms of Mexico
- Armorial of Mexico
