= Texcoco Region =

Region I (Spanish: Región XV Texcoco) is an intrastate region within the State of Mexico, one of 20. It borders the states of Puebla to the east corner of the state. The region comprises four municipalities (2020): Atenco, Chiconcuac, Texcoco and Tezoyuca. It is largely rural.

== Municipalities ==
- Atenco
- Chiconcuac
- Texcoco
- Tezoyuca
