= Naucalpan Region =

Region VIII (Spanish: Región VIII. Naucalpan) is an intrastate region within the State of Mexico. It borders Mexico City to the northwest in the Valley of Mexico, and the entire region is part of Metropolitan Area of the Valley of Mexico but the two least populated cities are left out of the Mexico City Metropolitan Area (see Greater Mexico City). It comprises five cities: Huixquilucan, Isidro Fabela, Jilotzingo, Naucalpan de Juárez, and Nicolás Romero.

Municipality	Area (km^{2}) 2010	Population 2005 Census	Population 2010 Census	Population density (/km^{2} 2010)
Huixquilucan	143.5	224,042	242,166	1,687.5
Tlazala de Fabela	67.15	8,788	10,308	153.5
Jilotzingo	117.1	13,825	17,970	153.6
Naucalpan de Juárez	149.86	821,442	833,782	5,563
Nicolás Romero	233.5	306,516	366,604	1,570
Region VIII Naucalpan	711.1	1,374,613	1,470,830	2,068.4
