= Chimalhuacán =

City and municipality in State of Mexico, Mexico

- City & Municipality
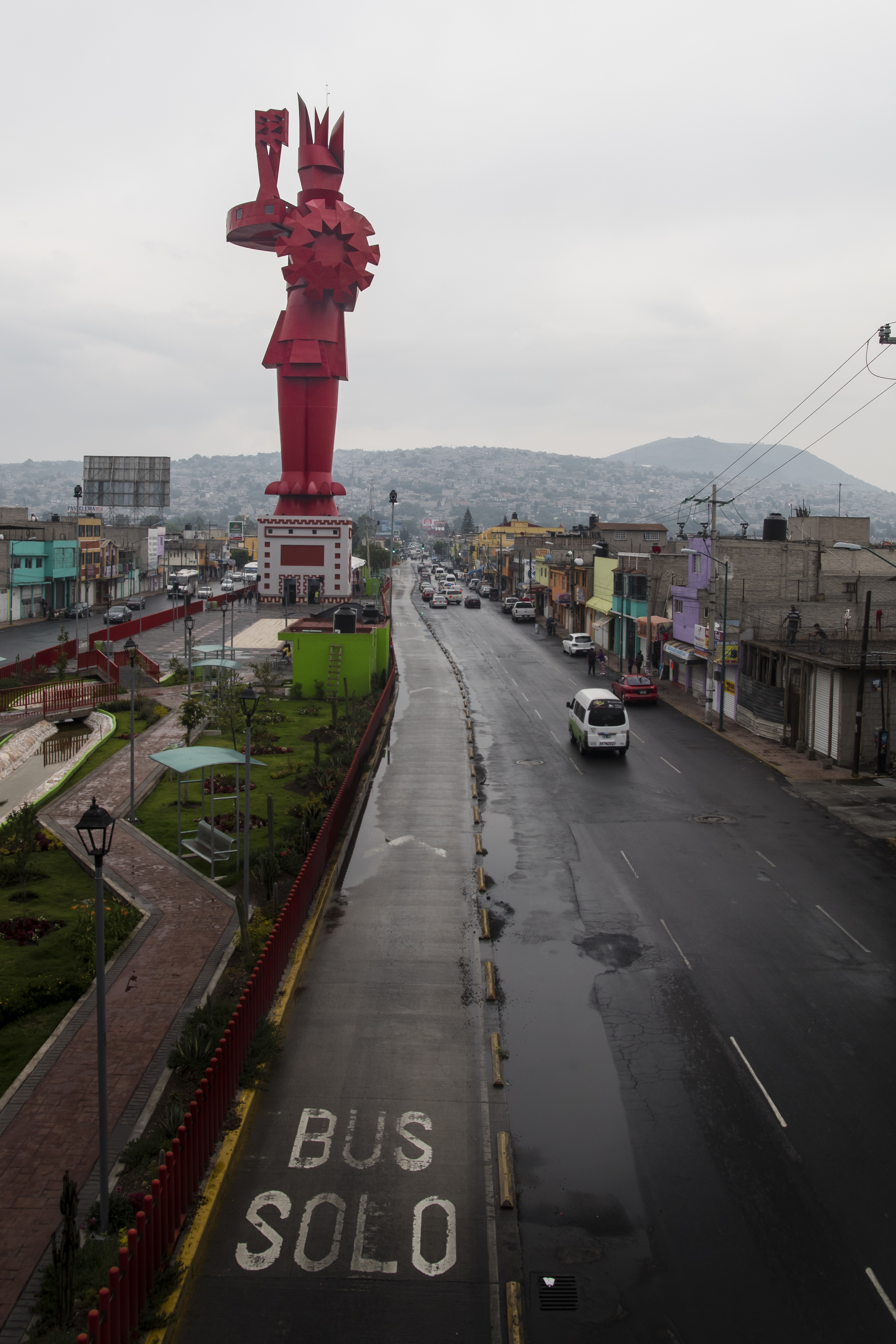
- The Guerrero Chimalli monument

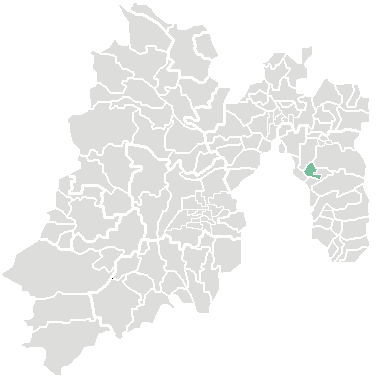
- Location in Mexico State

- Location within Mexico
- Coordinates: 19°24′47″N 98°59′02″W
- Country: Mexico
- State: State of Mexico
- Metro area: Greater Mexico City
- Region: Chimalhuacán Region
- Founded: 1259
- Municipal Status: October, 1842
- Municipal Seat: Chimalhuacán

Government
  - Type: Ayuntamiento
  - Municipal President: Xóchitl Flores Jimenez

Area
  - Municipality: 44.69 km^{2} (17.25 sq mi)
  - Water: 0.80 km^{2} (0.31 sq mi)
- Elevation (of seat): 2,240 m (7,350 ft)

Population (2020)
  - Municipality: 705,193
- Time zone: UTC-6 (Central (US Central))
- Postal code (of seat): 56330
- Area code: 55
- Demonym: Chimalhuaquense
- Website: Official website (in Spanish)

Chimalhuacán (Spanish pronunciation: [tʃimalwaˈkan]) (Nahuatl for "place of those who have shields") is a city and municipality located in the eastern part of State of Mexico, Mexico. It lies just outside the northeast border of Mexico City and is part of the Greater Mexico City urban area.

== The city ==
The city is practically coextensive with the municipality. The census of 2005 reported a population of 524,223 for the city and 525,389 for the municipality as a whole.

Chimalhuacán was founded 1259 by three chiefs or tlatoani named Huauxomatl, Chalchiutlatonac and Tlatzcantecuhtli. These chiefs and their people originated from Tula and Culhuacán. They spoke Chichimeca and Mexica languages but with time their customs merged and Náhuatl became the dominant language. It became subject to Texcoco, and through that belonged to the Aztec Triple Alliance in 1431. The Spanish town of Chimalhuacán was founded in 1529 and the Dominicans built a church and monastery here in 1563.

== The municipality ==
Although the city takes up almost all of the municipality, Chimalhuacán, as the municipal seat, has governing jurisdiction over the following communities: Colonia Nueva de Guadalupe la Palma, La Pista de los Corredores, Pista Aérea, Tlatel San Juan Xochiaca Parte Alta, and Zapotla.

Chimalhuacan has a new park in the center of the municipality, Plaza Estado de Mexico Chimalhuacan, with a library, theater and other places for entertainment. The entry of the municipality has a monument to Chimalhucán, called Guerrero Chimalli, a 60-meter-tall steel statue.

The municipality has an area of 46.61 km^{2} (17.996 sq mi). The adjacent municipalities are Nezahualcóyotl, Atenco, Texcoco, Chicoloapan, and La Paz. The city is the sixth largest in the state in population (after Ecatepec de Morelos, Nezahualcóyotl, Naucalpan de Juárez, Toluca, and Tlalnepantla de Baz).
