= Cuautitlán Izcalli Region =

Region IV (Spanish: Región IV. Cuautitlán Izcalli) is an intrastate region within the State of Mexico. It lies to the north of Mexico City, in the Valley of Mexico, bordering the state of Hidalgo. The whole region is one of the ten in the state which form part of the Metropolitan Area of the Valley of Mexico, although Villa del Carbón is not included in the definition of the metropolitan area.

The region comprises five municipalities, Coyotepec, Cuautitlán Izcalli, Huehuetoca, Tepotzotlán, and Villa del Carbón.

Municipality	Land area		Population 2020	Population 2010	Change	Population density
Municipality	km^{2}	sq mi	Population 2020	Population 2010	Change	Population density
Coyotepec	39.9	15.4	40,885	39,030	+4.8%	1,024.7/km^{2} (2,653.9/sq mi)
Cuautitlán Izcalli	110.1	42.5	555,163	511,675	+8.5%	5,042.4/km^{2} (13,059.6/sq mi)
Huehuetoca	119.8	46.3	284,965	100,023	+184.9%	2,378.7/km^{2} (6,160.7/sq mi)
Tepotzotlán	207.1	80.0	103,696	88,559	+17.1%	500.7/km^{2} (1,296.8/sq mi)
Villa del Carbón	303.3	117.1	51,498	44,881	+14.7%	169.8/km^{2} (439.8/sq mi)
Region IV Cuautitlan Izcalli	780.2	301.2	1,036,207	784,168	+32.1%	1,328.1/km^{2} (3,439.8/sq mi)
