= Nezahualcóyotl Region =

Region IX (Spanish: Región IX. Nezahualcóyotl) is an intrastate region within the State of Mexico.

== Geography ==
The region is within the Mexico City Metropolitan Area. It borders Mexico City to the east, and is part of the Greater Mexico City area.

Region IX consists only of the city of Ciudad Nezahualcóyotl, therefore regional statistics are the same as the city.
