= Ixtapaluca =

- City & municipality
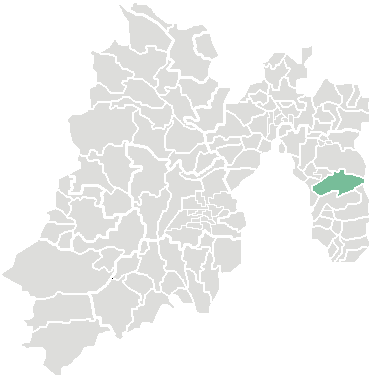
- Location of Ixtapaluca in the State of Mexico
- Coordinates: 19°19′07″N 98°52′56″W
- Country: Mexico
- State: State of Mexico
- Region: Region I
- Metro area: Greater Mexico City
- Municipal Status: December 5, 1820
- Municipal Seat: Ixtapaluca

Government
  - Type: Ayuntamiento
  - Municipal President: Carlos Enriquez Santos

Area
  - Municipality: 327.40 km^{2} (126.41 sq mi)
  - Land: 327.40 km^{2} (126.41 sq mi)
  - Water: 0.00 km^{2} (0 sq mi)
- Elevation (seat): 2,250 m (7,380 ft)

Population (2015)
  - Municipality: 495,563
  - Seat: 290,076
- Demonym: Ixtapaluquense
- Time zone: UTC-6 (CST)
- Postal code (of seat): 56530
- Area code: 55
- Website: Official website (in Spanish)

Ixtapaluca is a city and a municipality in the eastern part of the State of Mexico in Mexico. It lies between Mexico City and the western border of the state of Puebla. The name Ixtapaluca means "Where the salt gets wet".

As of 2006, Ixta included part of the world's largest habitational zone, along with Chalco and Neza.

== The city ==
At the census of 2005 the city had a population of 290,076.

The parish of Ixtapaluca was founded in 1531 and had great prominence in the area. The municipal palace was built in 1973.

== The municipality ==
As municipal seat, the town of Ixtpaluca has governing jurisdiction over the following communities: Acozac, Ampliación San Francisco, Cabaña de los Medina, Camino a Mina Milagro (El Potrero), Camino Mina Rosita, Cerro de la Abundancia, Coatepec, Colonia Julio Chávez López (UPREZ), Colonia Tetitla, Ejido el Capulín, Ejido San Francisco (Las Joyas), Ejidos de Xalpa (Camino de los Alcanfores), El Campamento (Las Cocinas) El Carmen, El Corazón, El Cuarenta, El Jaral (El Capulín), El Patronato del Maguey (Santa Rosa), El Pozo del Venado, El Treinta y Nueve (Dos Jagüeyes), El Treinta y Siete (Kilómetro Diecinueve), General Manuel Ávila Camacho, Huertas de Canutillo, Jorge Jiménez Cantú, La Cañada, La Cañada, La Espinita (Parque Industrial la Espinita), La Granja, La Guadalupana, La Mesa, Linderos de Ixtapaluca (El Tablón), Llano Grande (Rancho Viejo), Loma del Rayo (Chocolines Segunda Sección), Lomas de Coatepec, Los Cedros, Los Hornos, Los Lavaderos, Los Vergeles, Piedra Grande (Las Cabañas), Pueblo Nuevo (San Isidro Labrador), Puente del Tablón, Puente el Mezquite, Rancho el Guarda, Rancho Francisco Santillán (Atzizintla Tres), Rancho la Pastoría, Rancho la Peña, Rancho Loma Ancha, Rancho los Gavilanes, Rancho San Isidro, Rancho Venta Nueva, Rancho Verde, Río Frío de Juárez, Ricardo Calva, San Buenaventura, San Francisco Acuautla, San Jerónimo Cuatro Vientos, Santa Ana, Santa Bárbara, Tierras Comunales (Cerro de Ayotla), Villas de Escalerillas (Bellavista), and Zoquiapan.

The municipality had a population of 429,033 in 2005. The area of the municipality is 315.10 km^{2} (121.66 sq mi). The municipality is part of the Mexico City metropolitan area. It is an important suburb because many people that work in Mexico City live in Ixtapaluca, and it has developed recent commercial interest due to this. The first "fraccionamiento" or subdivision called San José de la Palma, Municipio de Ixtapaluca, was built in 1989. The municipality is bordered by Chalco, Valle de Chalco Solidaridad, Chicoloapan, La Paz, Texcoco, Tlalmanalco, and the state of Puebla.

The area was first settled in 1286 by the Mexicas. After the Spanish conquest, in 1543 Ixtapaluca was given to the control of Juan de Cuellar, who continued the indigenous practice of demanding tribute every 80 days from the people.
