= Toluca Region =

- Region
- Country: Mexico
- State: Estado de México
- Largest settlement: Toluca

Area
  - Total: 1,193 km^{2} (461 sq mi)

Population (2020)
  - Total: 1,565,247

Region XIII (Spanish: Región 13. Toluca) is an intrastate region within the State of Mexico, one of 20. It lies in the center of the state. The region comprises twelve municipalities (see below). It is largely rural.

== Municipalities ==
- Almoloya de Juárez
- Almoloya del Río
- Calimaya
- Chapultepec
- Metepec
- Mexicaltzingo
- Rayón
- San Antonio la Isla
- Tenango del Valle
- Toluca
- Texcalyacac
- Zinacantepec
