= Tlatlaya =

- Municipality
- Location within Mexico Location within State of Mexico
- Coordinates: 18°37′01″N 100°12′29″W
- Country: Mexico
- State: Mexico State
- Municipality: Tlatlaya
- Municipal Seat: Tlatlaya

Government
  - Municipal President: Crisoforo Hernández Mena (2006-2009)
- Time zone: UTC-6 (CST)

Tlatlaya is one of 125 municipalities of the State of Mexico in Mexico. The municipal seat is the town of Tlatlaya which is the eleventh largest town in the municipality. The word “Tlatlaya” means when the hearth is black and red.

== The town ==
The area was settled mostly by Matlatzincas and Chontales, but there were also significant numbers of Otomis, Mexicas and Purépuchas. No large cities were built in this area but there are a number of archeological sites in the town itself as well as Teopazul, Rincón Grande, Cerro del Tecolote, Copaltepec, San Francisco, Santa Ana Zicatecoyan, el Cerro de Tequesquite, and San Vicente with many "chontal" type buildings make of mud and stone as well as objects for daily and ritual use. This used to be a major border crossing area between Mexica and Purépecha-dominated areas. However, the area suffered attacks from the Purépecha because it was technically Aztec territory. During the Spanish Conquest, the area did not resist Spanish domination, allowing for evangelization as early as 1526 by missionaries, which included the descendants of the Aztec tlatoani Chimalpopoca. Juan Saucedo was the first Spanish governor from 1527 to 1534. The Spanish discovered and established mines here in 1533. From 1683 to 1785, Tlatlaya suffered the Spanish Inquisition. The town became the head of the República de Indios de Tlatlaya (Indian Republic of Tlatlaya) from 1743 to 1754. Vicente Guerrero and Pedro Ascencio were active here during the Mexican War of Independence which lasted from 1810 to 1821.

While the town of Tlatlaya has been the economic and political center of the area since pre-Hispanic times, it did not officially become a municipal seat until 1849 and did not become completely independent of the district of Sultepec until 1919. The town and area surrounding it favored the Liberation Army of the South (Zapatistas) during the Mexican Revolution. In 1950, the San Pedro Limón airfield was completed as well as a heliport in 1972.

Despite having a population of only 553 people as of 2005, the town of Tlatlaya is the largest community in the municipality and functions as the government of more than 160 communities. The town lies at an elevation of 1840 meters above sea level.

The most important tourist attraction is the parish of “Apostol Santiago” building on the 16th century.

== The municipality ==
The current municipality was established in 1849, even though the town of Tlatlaya has been the political and economic heart of the area since pre-Hispanic times. The municipality of Tlatlaya has an extension of 798.92 square kilometers. Tlatlaya is bounded in the north by the municipality of Amatepec, and in the south by the state of Guerrero. The weather in Tlatlaya is tropical with rains in summer.

The population of the municipality is widely dispersed among more than 160 villages as well as more than 60 locations where there are only one or two houses. The total population of all these small villages in 2005 totaled 33,308.

Due to its very rural nature, the principal economica activity of the municipality is agriculture followed by livestock. There are more than 3,400 farms and other fields devoted to crops covering more than 70% of the municipality's territory. There are also 24 ejidos (cooperative farms) located here. Principal crops include corn, beans, chili peppers, squash, tomatoes, onions, melons, mango and papaya. Most of the livestock raised here are pigs and cattle.

List of communities in the municipality of Tlatlaya Agua Fría, El Alambique, La Alcantarilla, Amacuatitla, Ancón de los Curieles, Dieciocho de Marzo, Cacahuananche, Cuadrilla del Cirián (Cirián Grande), El Ciruelo, Coatepec (Coatepequito), La Cofradía, Corral de Piedra, Cruz del Norte, Coahuayana, Coahuilotes (Pueblo Nuevo), La Cueva, Chachalacatenco, Las Esmeraldas, El Gavilán, El Guayabo, El Higo Prieto, Huixtitla, Juntas del Río Limón, Las Juntas (Las Juntas del Paso), La Lagunilla, El Limón, El Llano, El Mango, Mayaltepec, Moctezuma (Colonia Moctezuma), El Montón, El Naranjito, El Naranjo, El Naranjo Palmar Grande, Nuevo Copaltepec, Palmar Grande, Palma Torcida, Palos Verdes, El Panal, La Parota, Paso de Jaquinicuil, Peña del Órgano, Pie del Cerro San Vicente, Pie del Cerro, El Potrero, Puerto de la Arena, Puerto Seco, Rancho Cuá, Ranchos Nuevos (Rancho Nuevo), Rancho Viejo, El Revelado, Rincón del Aguacate, Rincón Grande, El Salitre Ojo de Agua, Salitre Grande, Salitrillo, San Antonio del Rosario, San Felipe Tepehuastitlán, San Francisco de Asís (San Francisco), San Juan Tetitlán, San Juan Corral, San Mateo (San Mateo Guayatenco), San Pedro Limón, Santa Ana Zicatecoyan, Santa Cruz, Santa María, Tejupilquito, El Temblor, Tierra Blanca, Teopazul (Teopazul el Encinal), Tlacocuspan (Tlacocuspan Santa Cruz), Río Topilar (Topilar), El Toroal, El Zapote (El Zapote San Antonio del Rosario), El Zopilote, Pinzán Morado (Cerro Blanco), Cerro de Aguacatepec, Cerro Verde, Corral de Piedra Dos (Corral de Piedra), Corral de Vigas, El Coyol, El Devanador, La Guacamaya, El Limo, Limón Terrero, Macuatitla, Los Ocotes, Las Parotas, Piedra Ancha, Pinzán Morado, El Poroche, El Reparo, El Sauz, El Suchual de Santa Ana (El Suchual), Tecomatlán, El Terrero, El Terroncillo, La Ceiba, Cuadrilla de Flores, Peña Blanca, Cirián Grande, Los Bautistas (Cerro de los Bautistas), Las Juntas de Azúchil, El Tiquimil, Puerto Frío, El Conejo (Colonia Nueva), Peña del Agua, Barranca de las Flores, Plan del Alambique, Ancón de la Presa, Charco del Lagarto, Cerro del Morado, Arenal, Pueblo Nuevo, Corral Parota (Tepehuastitlán), La Víbora, Chano Mucio (Chanumucio), Vuelta del Río, El Mango, Juntas de Santa Ana Zicatecoyan, El Coyol, Cuadrilla Nueva, El Naranjito(Naranjito del Paso), Azúchil, El Cascalote, La Cofradía, La Cubata, Tierra Blanca, El Guitarratel, Juntas del Paso Topilar, Loma Larga, Mazatitla, Miraveles, Peña Colorada, Plan de la Cuadrilla, Barriales, Cuadrilla de los Sotero, Cuadrilla Nueva, Los Ilamos, Las Juntas, Los Limones, El Mogote (Plan Grande), La Parota, Cuadrilla de las Flores, Rincón del Coyol, El Salitre (Salitre Tlatlaya), La Sarna (El Obrador), Puerto Minatitlán, Puerto de los Martínez, Puerto del Órgano-Las Esmeraldas, El Anono, Colonia Benito Juárez, Los Hornos, El Tamarindo, El Manguito, Cuadrilla de Gutiérrez, El Nanche, Palos Altos, San Lucas Los Encinos de los Timbres, Cerro del Mango, El Mango (Puerto el Encinal), La Unión and La Laguna Puerto de la Arena.

== Notable people ==
- Herminia Albarrán Romero, papel picado artist

Salomé Estrada Nieto, President (1916-1917 & 1925)

Profr. Z.Felipe Segura E, President (1985-1987)
