= Litoral centro, Yucatán =

Litoral centro
- Region
- Country: Mexico
- State: Yucatán
- Time zone: UTC−6 (CST)

Litoral centro is one of the regions of Yucatán, Mexico.
