= Noreste, Yucatán =

Noreste
- Region
- Interactive map of Noreste
- Coordinates: 20.9638°N 89.6279°W
- Country: Mexico
- State: Yucatán
- Time zone: UTC−6 (CST)

Noreste is one of the regions of Yucatán, Mexico.
