= Poniente, Yucatán =

Poniente
- Region
- Country: Mexico
- State: Yucatán
- Time zone: UTC−6 (CST)

Poniente is one of the regions of Yucatán, Mexico.
