= Oriente, Yucatán =

Oriente
- Region
- Interactive map of Oriente
- Coordinates (Valladolid): 20°41′26.43″N 88°12′9.77″W
- Country: Mexico
- State: Yucatán
- Time zone: UTC−6 (CST)

Oriente is one of the regions of Yucatán, Mexico.
