= State of Mexico =

State of central Mexico

Mexico México (Spanish) Mexihco (Nahuatl) Mundö (Otomi)
- State
- Free and Sovereign State of Mexico; Estado Libre y Soberano de México (Spanish); Tlahtohcayotl Mexihco (Nahuatl); Lëngu Mundö (Otomi)
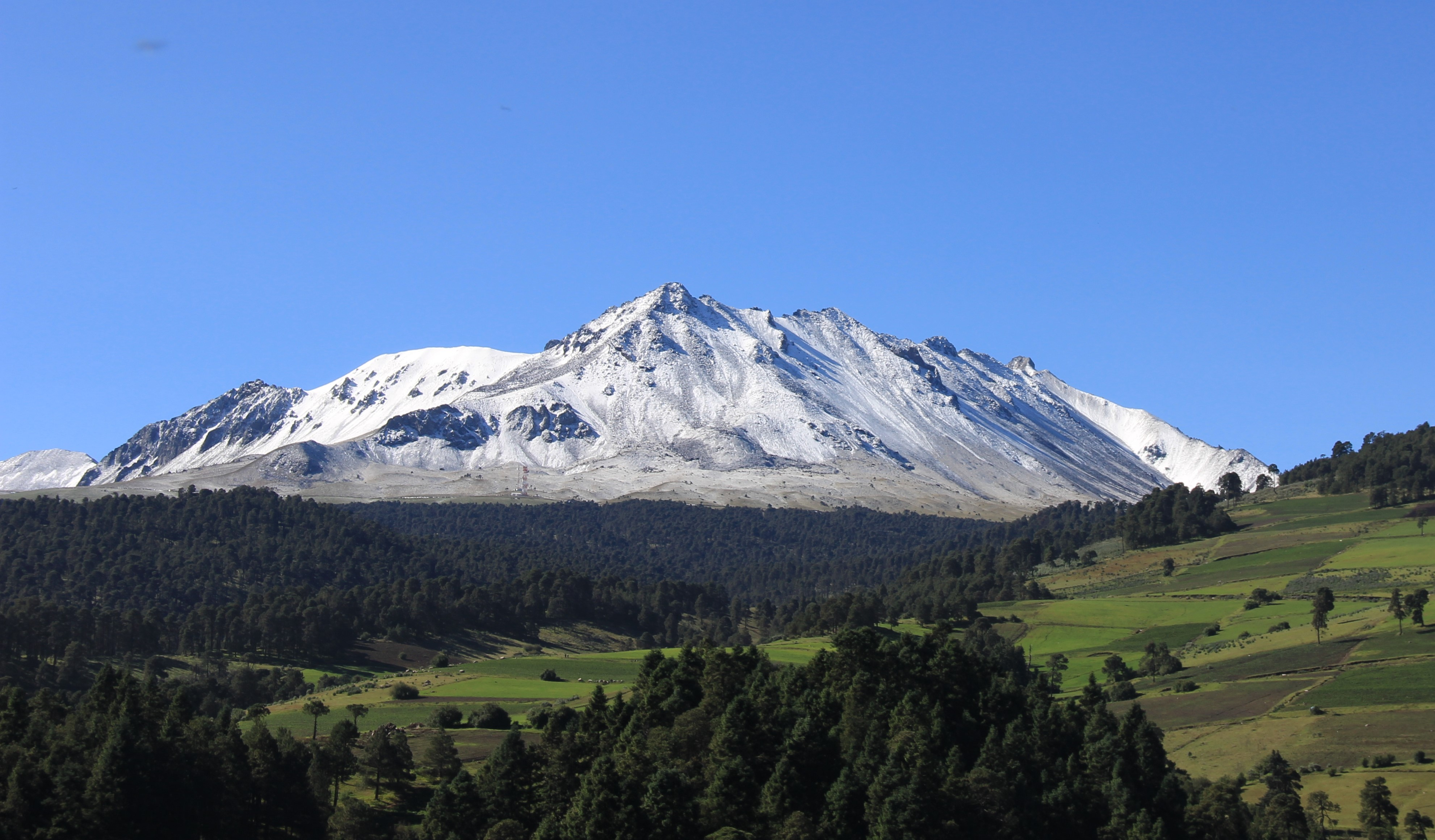
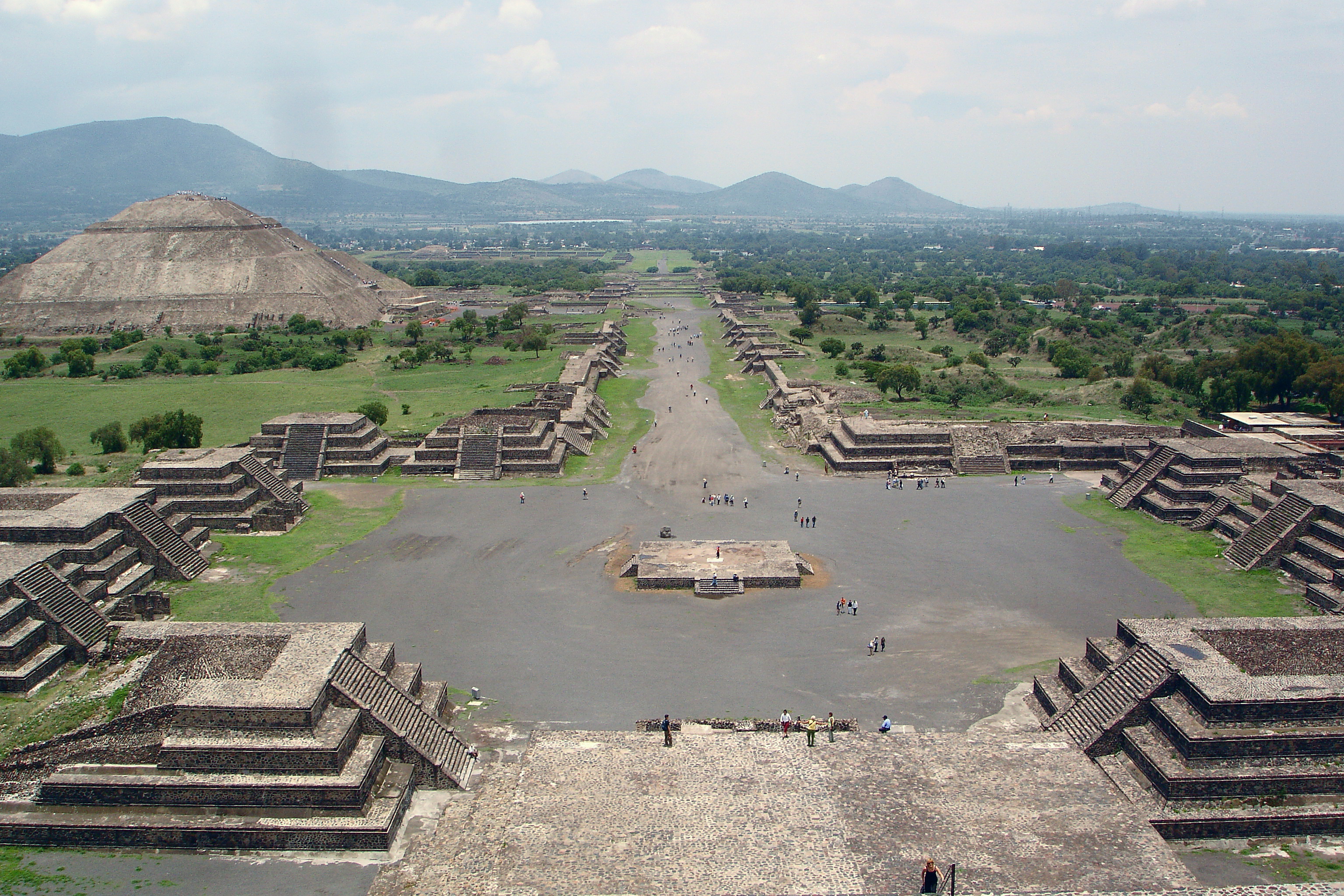
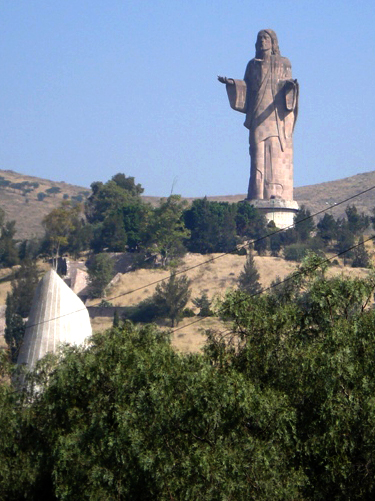
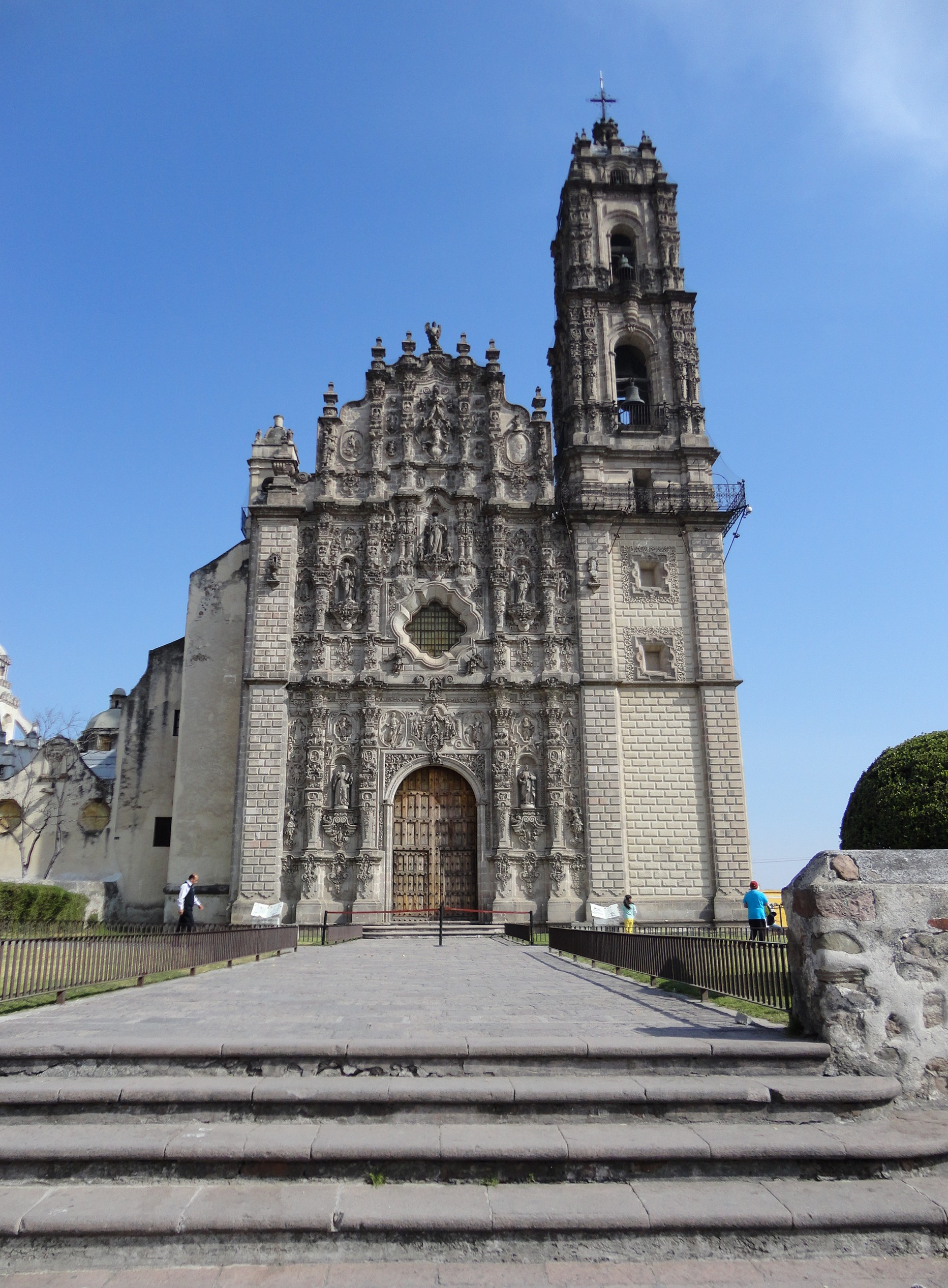
- Nevado de Toluca Teotihuacán Statue of Cristo Rey Museo Nacional del Virreinato

- Coat of arms
- Motto: Libertad, Trabajo, Cultura ('Freedom, Work, Culture')
- Anthem: "Himno al Estado de México"
- Coordinates: 19°21′N 99°38′W
- Country: Mexico
- Admission: 20 December 1823 (1st)
- Capital: Toluca de Lerdo
- Largest city: Ecatepec de Morelos
- Largest metro Municipalities: Greater Mexico City 125

Government
  - Governor: Delfina Gómez Álvarez (Morena)
  - Legislature: State of Mexico Congress
  - Senators: Martha Guerrero (MRN); Higinio Martínez (MRN); Juan Manuel Zepeda (PRD)

Area
  - Total: 22,351 km^{2} (8,630 sq mi)
  - Rank: 25th
- Highest elevation (Popocatépetl): 5,500 m (18,000 ft)

Population (2020)
  - Total: 16,992,418
  - Rank: 1st
  - Density: 760.25/km^{2} (1,969.0/sq mi)
  - Rank: 1st
- Demonym(s): Mexiquense, Mexiqueño(a)

GDP
  - Total: MXN 2.577 trillion (US$128.2 billion) (2022)
  - Per capita: (US$7,380) (2022)
- Time zone: UTC−06:00 (Central)
- Postal code: 50-57
- Area code: Area codes: • 1; • 2; • 3; • 4
- ISO 3166 code: MX-MEX
- HDI: ▲0.802 very high Ranked 14th of 32
- Website: Official website

The State of Mexico, (Note: Spanish: Estado de México, pronounced [esˈtaðo ðe ˈmexiko]) officially Mexico, (Note: The official name is simply "Mexico" (Spanish: México) but it is called "State of Mexico" or "Edomex" to distinguish it from the country, and from its capital "Mexico City".) is one of the 32 federal entities of the United Mexican States. Sharing its name with both the country and the national capital, Mexico City, the state is colloquially distinguished as Edomex ([eðoˈmeks], from E[sta]do [de] Méx[ico], "State of Mexico"). It is the most populous and second most densely populated state in Mexico.

Located in central Mexico, the state is divided into 125 municipalities. The state capital city is Toluca de Lerdo ("Toluca"), while its largest city is Ecatepec de Morelos ("Ecatepec"). The State of Mexico surrounds Mexico City on three sides. It borders the states of Querétaro and Hidalgo to the north, Morelos and Guerrero to the south, Michoacán to the west, and Tlaxcala and Puebla to the east.

The territory now comprising the State of Mexico once formed the core of the pre-Hispanic Aztec Empire. During the Spanish colonial period, the region was incorporated into New Spain. After gaining independence in the 19th century, Mexico City was chosen as the new nation's capital; its territory was separated from the state. Years later, parts of the state were broken off to form the states of Hidalgo, Guerrero, and Morelos. These territorial separations have left the state with the size and shape it has today, with the Toluca Valley to the west of Mexico City and a panhandle that extends around the north and east of this entity.

The demonym used to refer to people and things from the state is mexiquense, distinct from mexicano ('Mexican'), which describes the people or things from the whole country.

== Origin and etymology ==
Mēxihco was originally the Nahuatl name for the Valley of Mexico where the cities of the Mexica (the proper name for the Aztec Triple Alliance) were located. As such, the district that became Mexico City was properly known as Mexico-Tenochtitlan in the years shortly before and after the Spanish conquest. After the Spanish Conquest, the term México came to be used for Tenochtitlan/Mexico City and all the pre-conquest lands it controlled, including several other aforementioned states originally incorporated in the boundaries of the state of Mexico.

There are two possible origins for the name "Mexico." The first is that it derives from metztli (moon) and xictla (navel) to mean "from the navel of the moon". This comes from the old Aztec idea that the craters on the moon form a rabbit figure with one crater imitating a navel. The other possible origin is that it is derived from "Mextictli", an alternate name for the god Huitzilopochtli.

Anáhuac was the proper term for all territories dominated by the Aztec Empire, from Cem Anáhuac, "the entire earth" or "surrounded by waters" e.g. the waters of Lake Texcoco which were considered to be the center of the Aztec world, and as such was proposed as an early name for the entire nation of Mexico prior to independence, to distinguish it from the (preexisting) administrative division of New Spain that became the State of Mexico.

== History ==
=== Prehistoric to Pre-Hispanic period ===
The earliest evidence of human habitation in the current territory of the state is a quartz scraper and obsidian blade found in the Tlapacoya area, which was an island in the former Lake Chalco. They are dated to the Pleistocene era which dates human habitation back to 20,000 years. The first people were hunter-gatherers. Stone age implements have been found all over the territory, from mammoth bones to stone tools to human remains. Most have been found in the areas of Los Reyes Acozac, Tizayuca, Tepexpan, San Francisco Mazapa, El Risco and Tequixquiac. Between 20,000 and 5000 BCE, the people here eventually went from hunting and gathering to sedentary villages with farming and domesticated animals. The main crop was corn, and stone tools for the grinding of this grain became common. Later crops include beans, chili peppers, and squash grown near established villages. Evidence of ceramics appears around 2500 BCE with the earliest artifacts of these appearing in Tlapacoya, Atoto, Malinalco, Acatzingo and Tlatilco.

In the pre-historic State of Mexico, the Tepexpan Man is an important finding for Mexican and foreign anthropologists; it is an important key to understanding what the Valley of Mexico area was like, 5,000 years ago, as well as helping establish the occupation chronology of the region. Currently, some scholars attribute an age of 11,000 years, others 8,000, and some have suggested 5,000 years old. This individual was originally identified as a male, but recent research confirms a female identity, although this is still a subject of discussion.

Sacrum bone found in Tequixquiac is considered a work of prehistoric art. These people were thought to be nomadic, hunting large animals such as mammoths and gathering fruits as evidenced by archaeological evidence found at the site. One of the most salient discoveries of primitive art in America was found in here, called the Tequixquiac Bone, which had no known purpose, but reflected the ideological sense of the artist who carved the piece of bone from a camelid around 22,000 years BCE. The first native settlers of Tequixquiac were the Aztecs and Otomi, who decided to settle here permanently for the abundance of rivers and springs. They were engaged mainly in agriculture and the breeding of domestic animals.

The earliest major civilization of the state is Teotihuacan, with the Pyramids of the Sun and Moon being built between 100 BCE and 100 CE. Between 800 and 900 CE, the Matlatzincas established their dominion with Teotenango as capital. This city is walled with plazas, terraces, temples, altars, living quarters, and a Mesoamerican ball game court. In the 15th century, the Aztecs conquered the Toluca and Chalco valleys to the west and east of the Valley of Mexico respectively. Part of the Toluca Valley was held by the Purépechas as well. Other dominions during the pre-Hispanic period include that of the Chichimecas in Tenayuca and of the Acolhuas in Huexotla, Texcotizingo and Los Melones. Other important groups were the Mazahuas in the Atlacomulco area. Their center was at Mazahuacán, next to Jocotitlán volcano. The Otomis were centered in Jilotepec.

=== Spanish Colonial period ===
The origin of the modern state is the reorganization of Aztec lands starting after the Spanish Conquest of the Aztec Empire. These lands were initially called the audiencia of Mexico and included Mexico City and much of the modern states of Guerrero, Morelos, and Hidalgo. As the Spanish expanded their control west and south, the entirety was called "New Spain" with former Aztec lands being called "Mexico". The organization of New Spain would change throughout the colonial period, but the territory of the Aztecs would keep the name "Mexico".

After the Conquest in 1521, Hernán Cortés' cousin Juan Altamirano was given dominion of the Toluca Valley. Other conquistadors such as Antonio Caicedo, Juan de Jaramillo, Cristobal Hernandez, and Juan de Samano received encomiendas in the state. Franciscan missionaries came soon after, such as Martin de Valencia, Juan de Tecto, Juan de Ahora, and Pedro de Gante, who established missions and the first school called San Antonio de Padua.

In 1535, the areas around Mexico City were divided into several alcaldías mayores called Chalco y Ameca, Tlayacapan y Coatepec, Otumba, Ecatepec, Sultepec, Zacualpan, Temascaltepec, Malinalco, Metepec and Ixtlahuaca with Toluca and Texcoco recognized as cities. Other orders followed, such as the Dominicans, the Augustinians and the Jesuits.

During the colonial period, most of the area's economy was based on agriculture, with some mining in the areas of Temascaltepec, Sultepec, Valle de Bravo, Tlatlaya, Amatepec, and Zacualpan and the production of pulque in Otumba and Texcoco. In addition, certain areas were known for crafts such as wool processing in Texcoco and Sultepec, soap in Toluca, saddles in Almoloya de Juárez, and rebozos in various areas. However, the vast majority of the area's population was extremely poor due to exploitation.

=== Independence ===
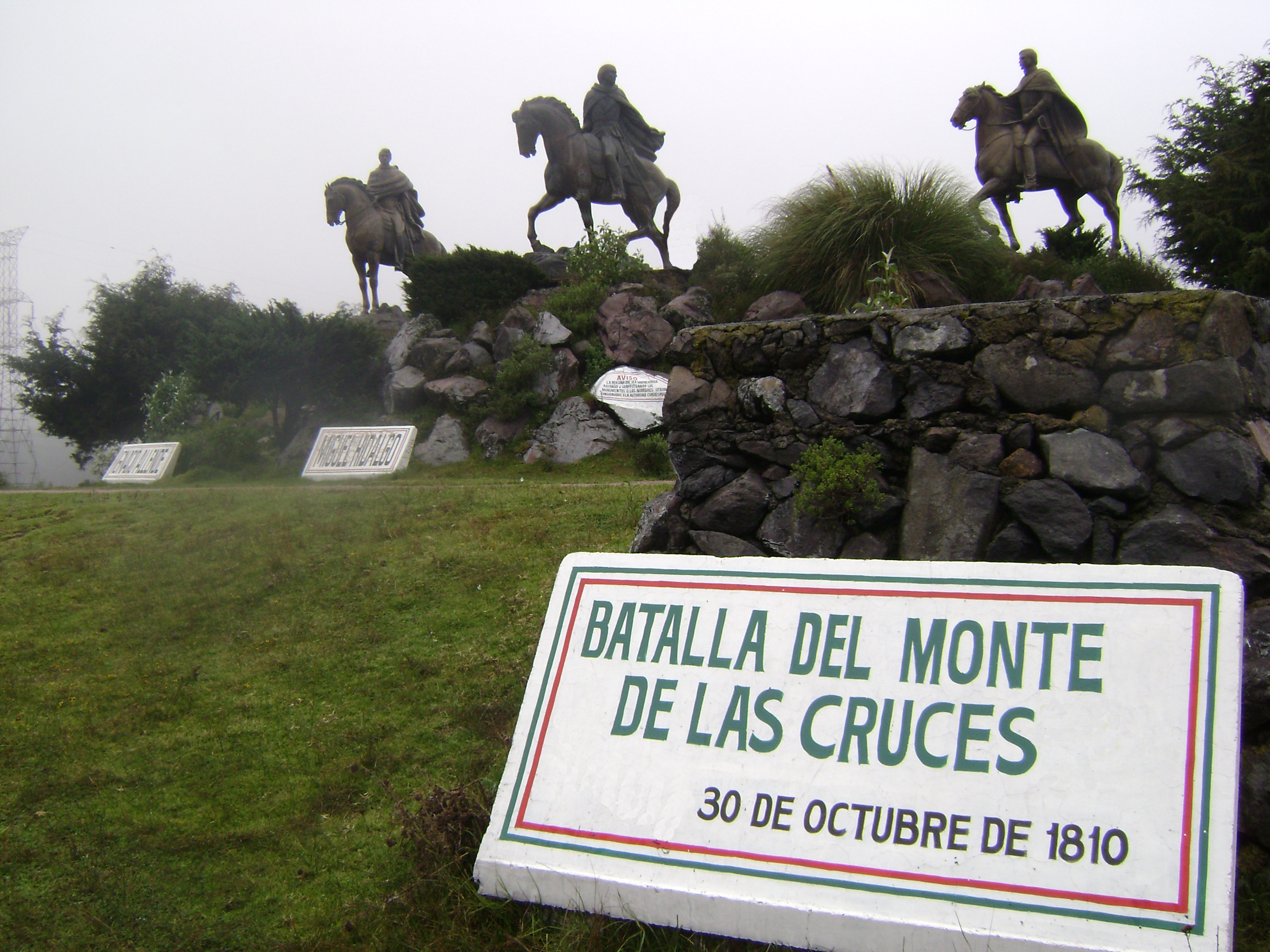
Monument to the Battle of Monte de las Cruces

During the Mexican War of Independence, Miguel Hidalgo y Costilla marched into what is now Mexico State from Michoacán in 1810, passing from the northwest to Toluca on his way to Mexico City. East of Toluca, he fought royalist forces at the Battle of Monte de las Cruces on 30 October 1810. While Hidalgo won the battle, he chose not to proceed to Mexico City and then turned towards Celaya. During the rest of the War, most battles were fought between local insurgent leaders such as Manuel de la Concha and Castillo Bustamante and royalist forces. Battles were fought in Sultepec, Amanalco, Temascaltepec, Lerma, Tenango, Tenancingo and Tecualoya.

After the War, the State of Mexico was created by the 1824 Constitution, with the first state congress convening in March of that year in Mexico City. This state still encompassed the vast territory of the old Aztec Empire. The first head of the state was Melchor Múzquiz. The vast territory of the state was divided into eight districts: Acapulco, Cuernavaca, Huejutla, Mexico, Taxco, Toluca, Tula and Tulancingo. Mexico City was the capital of the state. However, soon after, the federal government chose Mexico City as the capital of the new nation. Under the guidelines of the 1824 Constitution, the capital was appropriated as federal land, with the federal government acting as the local authority. The choice was made official on 18 November 1824, and Congress delineated a surface area of two leagues square (8,800 ac) centered on the Zocalo. This area was then separated from the State of Mexico, forcing the state's government to move from the Palace of the Inquisition (now Museum of Mexican Medicine) in the city to Texcoco. This area did not yet include the population centers of the towns of Coyoacán, Xochimilco, Mexicaltzingo and Tlalpan, all of which remained as part of the State of Mexico. As the "federal district" of Mexico City grew in size, these and other territories were taken from the State of Mexico. The capital of the state was moved permanently to Toluca in 1830.

The struggles between the liberals (federalists) and the conservatives (centralized power) in the 19th century affected the state, especially in those areas that would later break away to form the states of Hidalgo, Morelos, and Guerrero. During the Mexican–American War, the Americans occupied Toluca and Mexico City, with the state government temporarily located in the unoccupied Sultepec.

By 1852, the state had lost a significant amount of territory to the creation of the state of Guerrero, which prompted the reorganization of the municipalities here. During the Reform War, General José María Cobos took and sacked a number of municipalities in the territory remaining. During this war, a number of major figures such as Melchor Ocampo, Santos Degollado and Leandro Valle were executed by firing squad in the Toluca Valley regions.

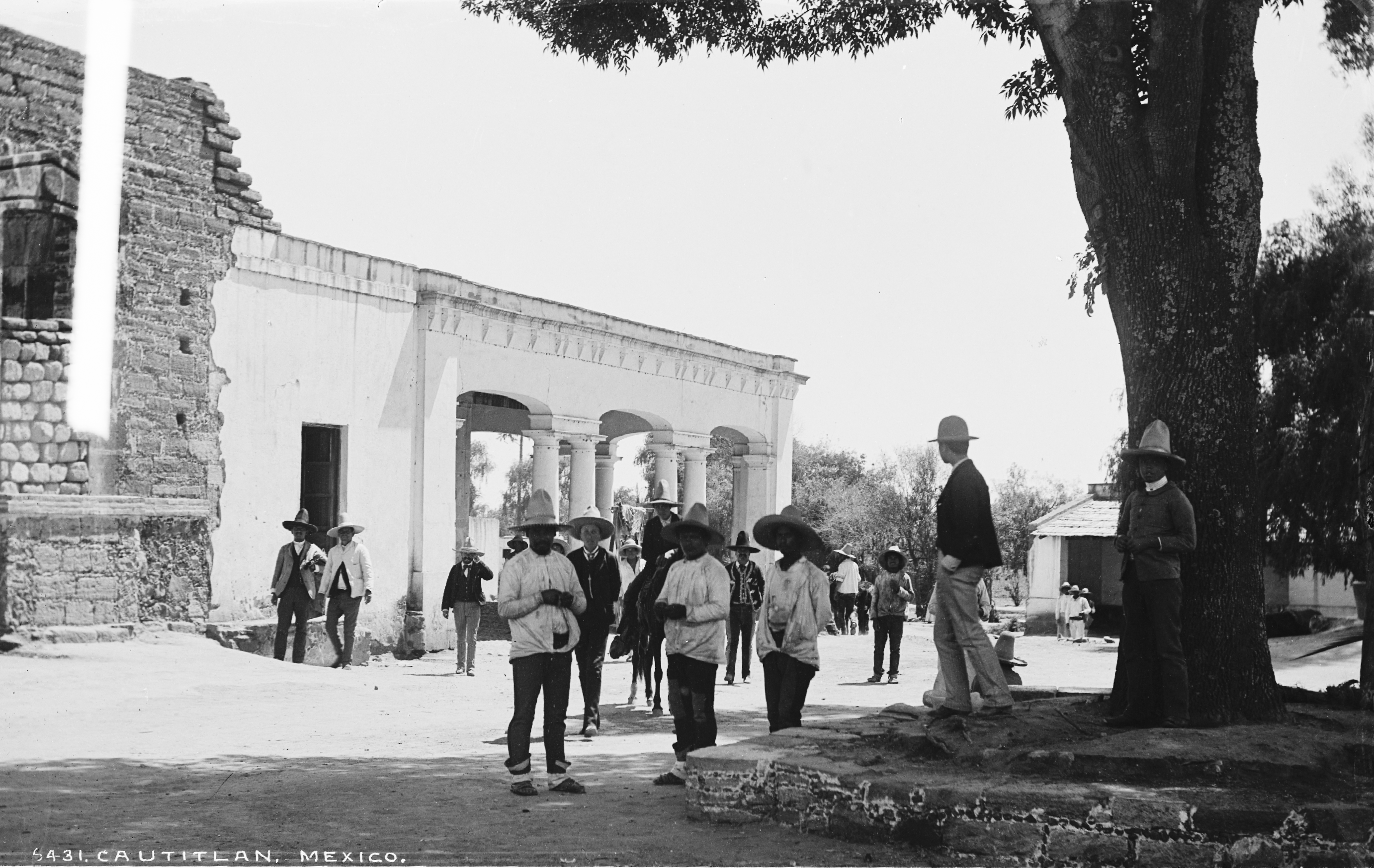
Inhabitants of Cuautitlán photographed between c. 1880 and 1897

In 1869, the areas to the northeast and south of Mexico City were converted to the states of Hidalgo and Morelos, respectively. The state promulgated a new constitution in 1869, which established the state as consisting of the districts of Chalco, Cuautitlan, Ixtlahuaca, Jilotepec, Lerma, Otumba, Sultepec, Temascaltepec, Tenango del Valle, Tenancingo and Texcoco, which is the territory the state has today. The period before the Mexican Revolution was relatively prosperous for the state, especially under governor José Vicente Villada, who promoted public education, government reform, the establishment of a teachers' college for women, and the Instituto Cientifico y Literario (later UAEM). Mines in various parts of the state were at maximum production.

=== Mexican Revolution ===
Battles were fought in the state during the Mexican Revolution, especially by Zapatistas in the southwest part of the state, with Genovevo de la O and Francisco de Pacheco entering with their armies in 1912. Fighting intensified after Victoriano Huerta took power in 1913. In 1915, Toluca was the site of the Convencion de Generales y Gobernadores Revolucionarios (Convention of Generals and Revolutionary Governors) on two occasions. In 1917, the state had another new constitution, which divided the state into sixteen districts and 118 municipalities.

The extension of the Mexico City Metropolitan Area began in 1940 with the creation of the industrial zone of Naucalpan. The increase of the metro area's population, commerce, and industry has continued to this day. The Consejo del Area Metropolitana was created in 1988 to coordinate concerns and actions of the Greater Mexico City area in both the Distrito Federal and the State of Mexico.

From 1824 to 1941, the state had no seal. Governor Wenceslao Labra proposed one in 1940, which was adopted the following year. It was designed by Pastor Velázquez with the motto of Patria, Libertad, Trabajo y Cultura ("Country, Liberty, Work, and Culture").

In 1956, the Instituto Cientifico y Literario was converted into the Universidad Autónoma del Estado de México.

During much of the rest of the 20th century, works to divert water from the Lerma River and other locations to Mexico City were built as well as highways through the state to connect Mexico City with the rest of the country.

In 1990, the Comisión Coordinadora para la Recuperación Ecológica de la Cuenca del Alto Lerma ("Coordinating Commission for the Ecological Recuperation of the Upper Lerma River Basin") was established.

== Geography ==
=== Limits ===
Its main neighbor is Mexico City.

The State of Mexico is located in the central zone of the Mexican Republic, in the eastern part of the Anáhuac table. It borders to the north with the states of Querétaro and Hidalgo; to the south with Guerrero and Morelos; to the east with Puebla and Tlaxcala; and to the west with Guerrero and Michoacán, as well as with Mexico City, which it surrounds to the north (northwest), east (southeast) and west (southwest).

=== Locations and ecosystems ===
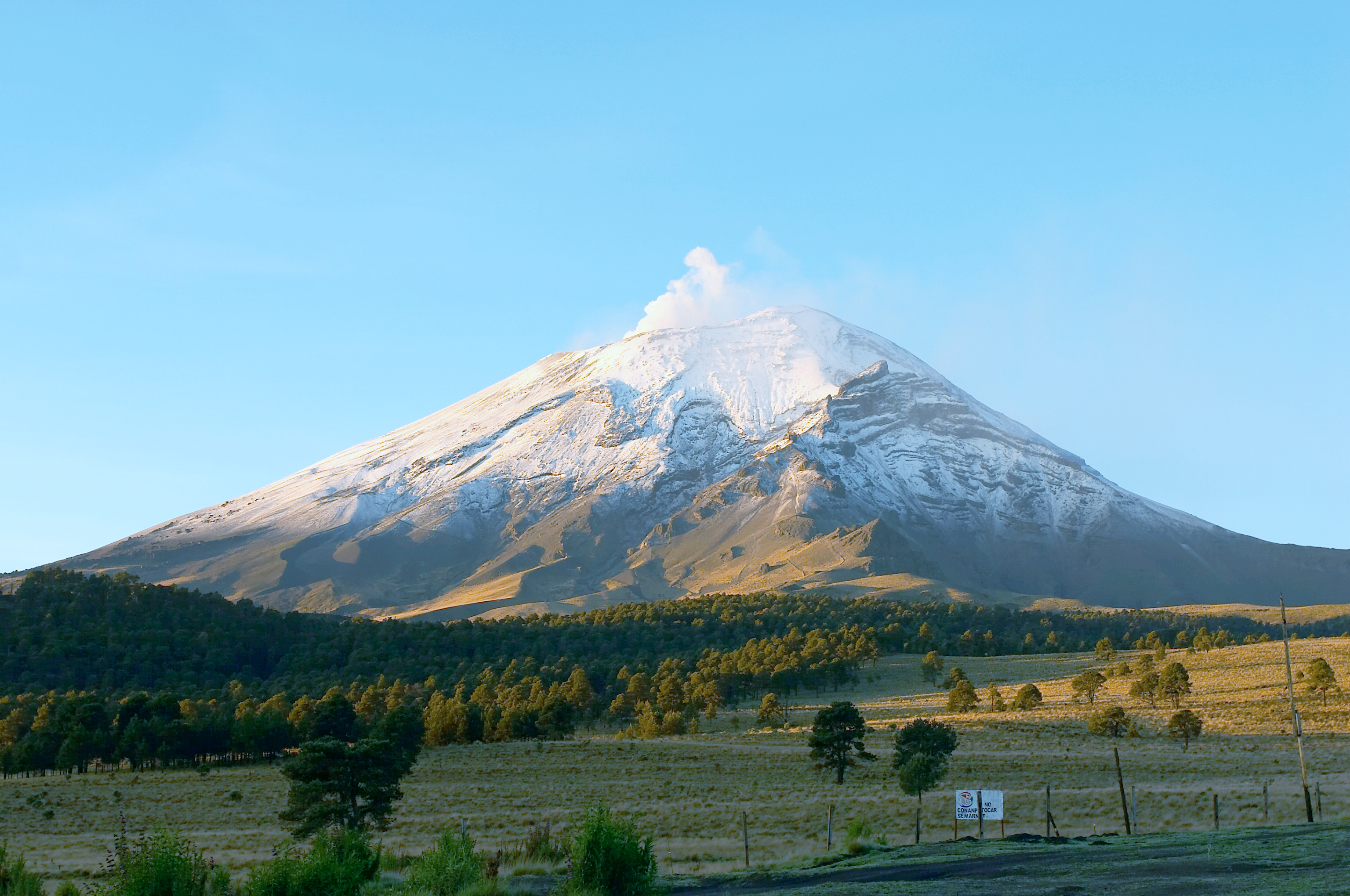
The Popocatépetl Volcano is the state's highest point

The state is located in the center of the country, consisting mostly of the eastern side of the Anahuác Mesa. Most of the state consists of the Toluca Valley, the Tierra Caliente, the Mezquital Valley, with the eastern panhandle mostly defined by the Chalco Valley. The state has a territory of 22,499.95 km².

The state is divided into five natural regions: the Volcanos of the Valley of Mexico, the hills and plains north of the state, the western mountains, the Balsas Depression, and the mountains and valleys of the southeast.

The physical geography of the state varies. The eastern portion is dominated by the Sierra Nevada, which divides the state from Puebla. In this mountain chain are the Popocatépetl and Iztaccíhuatl volcanos. The Sierra de Monte Alto and Sierra de Monte Bajo divide the west side of the Federal District from the state and contain peaks such as Cerro de la Bufa and Monte de las Cruces. The Sierra de Xinantécatl is to the south of the Toluca Valley. At the northern edge of this mountain range is the Nevado de Toluca volcano. In the northwest of the state is the Sierra de San Andrés Timilpan. Most of the rock and soil formation in the state is of volcanic origin.

There are three river basins in the state: the Lerma, the Balsas, and the Pánuco. The most important is the Lerma River, which begins in the municipality of Almoloya del Río and passes through a large number of municipalities in the state. The southwestern part of the state is dominated by the Balsas River basin. The eastern panhandle of the state is dominated by the Pánuco River basin. On the various rivers of the state are dams such as José Antonio Alzate in Temoaya, Ignacio Ramirez in Almoloya, Guadalupe in Cuautitlán Izcalli, Madín in Naucalpan, Vicente Guerrero in Tlatlaya, Tepetitlan in San Felipe del Progreso as well as those in Valle del Bravo and Villa Victoria.

Lakes in the state include the Laguna del Sol and Laguna de la Luna in the Nevado de Toluca, the lake in the crater of the Cerro Gordo. Atexcapan Lake in Valle de Bravo, San Simón Lake in Donato Guerra, San Pedro Lake and Concepcion de los Baños Lake, and Tepetitlan Lake in San Felipe del Progreso, Acuitzilapan Lake at the foot of Jocotitlan volcano, El Rodeo Lake near Xonacatlán, Xibojay and Santa Elena Lakes in Jilotepec, and Huapango Lake in Timilpan.

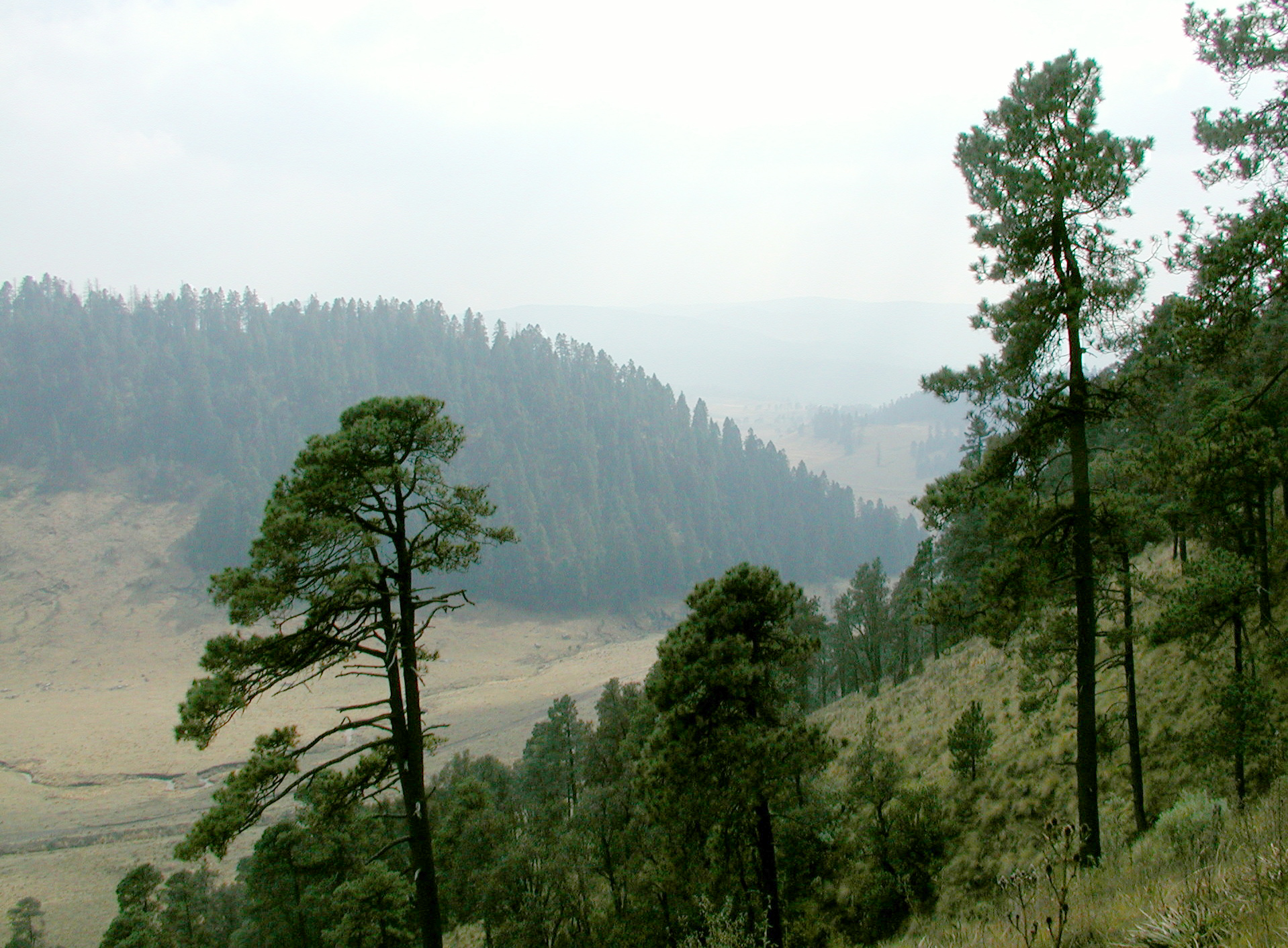
Forest at La Marquesa National Park

About seventy percent of the state has a temperate moist climate, which consists of the highlands of the Toluca Valley and the areas around Texcoco in the north, the Toluca Valley, and the areas around Texcoco. Average year-round temperature varies between 12°C and 18°C with annual precipitation above 700 millimeters. Higher elevations, about 13% of the state, in the center and east of the state have a semi-cold climate with average temperatures below 16°C. Hotter climes are in the relatively lowlands in the southwest, with an average temperature of between 18°C and 22°C, and constitute about eight percent of the territory. The hottest regions occupy five percent of the state in the extreme southwest with temperatures averaging over 22°C. The coldest areas are in the highest elevations, such as the Nevado de Toluca, Popocatepetl, and Iztaccihuatl. Snow can be found on these elevations year-round. There are some arid areas along the borders of Hidalgo and Tlaxcala with annual precipitation between 500 and 700 milliliters.

Due to the various climates, the state has a wide variety of flora. 609,000 hectares are covered in trees, most of which are in the temperate and cold climates of the state. In the extreme southwest of the state, rainforests can be found and desert plants in the Hidalgo border area. In the highest altitudes, such as the peak of the Nevada de Toluca, alpine grassland can be found. In the extreme west, some forests receive thousands of monarch butterflies each winter.

The state has 49 environmentally protected areas, with the most important being the Nevado de Toluca National Park. Other important areas include the state parks of Otomi-Mazahua, Sierra Morelos, and Nahuatlaca-Matlatzinca. The Bosencheve National Park extends into Mexico State from Michoacán and is one of the major monarch butterfly sanctuaries. At the far east is the Iztaccíhuatl–Popocatépetl National Park which is shared with the neighboring state of Puebla.

== Government and politics ==
=== Government ===
State divided into municipalities

The state is governed according to the Constitution of the State of Mexico and the law of the State of Mexico. The previous constitutions of 1827, 1861, and 1870 were replaced in 1917. The government is composed of legislative, executive, and judicial branches. The legislative branch is composed of the Congress of the State of México; the executive branch is composed of the Governor, Cabinet, and Public Prosecutor; and the judicial branch is composed of the Judicial Council, High Court of Justice, and lower courts.

The judiciary (Poder Judicial del Estado de México) is composed of:

- The High Court of Justice (Tribunal Superior de Justicia), the state's highest court.
- The Judicial Council (Consejo de la Judicatura), responsible for administration of the judiciary.
- The trial courts (juzgados de primera instancia).
- The small claims courts (juzgados de cuantía menor).

There are two metropolitan areas; the first is Greater Mexico City, in which there are 27 municipalities, and the city of Toluca, in which there are 6 municipalities. The trial courts are divided based on municipalities.

=== Regions ===
The state is divided into 125 municipalities, grouped into 20 regions, which are integrated as follows:

N.º	Region	Regional Headquarters
1	Amecameca Region	Amecameca
2	Atlacomulco Region	Atlacomulco
3	Chimalhuacán Region	Chimalhuacán
4	Cuautitlán Izcalli Region	Cuautitlán Izcalli
5	Ecatepec Region	Ecatepec de Morelos
6	Ixtlahuaca Region	Ixtlahuaca
7	Lerma Region	Lerma
8	Metepec Region	Metepec
9	Naucalpan Region	Naucalpan de Juárez
10	Nezahualcóyotl Region	Nezahualcóyotl
11	Otumba Region	Otumba
12	Tejupilco Region	Tejupilco
13	Tenancingo Region	Tenancingo
14	Tepotzotlán Region	Tepotzotlán
15	Texcoco Region	Texcoco
16	Tlalnepantla Region	Tlalnepantla de Baz
17	Toluca Region	Toluca
18	Tultitlán Region	Tultitlán
19	Valle de Bravo Region	Valle de Bravo
20	Zumpango Region	Zumpango de Ocampo

== Demographics ==
Largest cities or towns in State of Mexico Source:
Rank		Municipality	Pop.
1	San Cristóbal Ecatepec	Ecatepec de Morelos	1,643,623
2	Ciudad Nezahualcóyotl	Nezahualcóyotl	1,077,208
3	Naucalpan de Juárez	Naucalpan de Juárez	911,168
4	Toluca de Lerdo	Toluca	910,608
5	Chimalhuacán	Chimalhuacán	703,215
6	Tlalnepantla	Tlalnepantla de Baz	658,907
7	Cuautitlán Izcalli	Cuautitlán Izcalli	555,163
8	Ciudad López Mateos	Atizapán de Zaragoza	523,065
9	Xico	Valle de Chalco	384,327
10	Ixtapaluca	Ixtapaluca	368,585

Historical population
Year	Pop.	±%
1895	842,873	—
1900	934,463	+10.9%
1910	989,510	+5.9%
1921	884,617	−10.6%
1930	990,112	+11.9%
1940	1,146,034	+15.7%
1950	1,392,623	+21.5%
1960	1,897,851	+36.3%
1970	3,833,185	+102.0%
1980	7,564,335	+97.3%
1990	9,815,795	+29.8%
1995	11,707,964	+19.3%
2000	13,096,686	+11.9%
2005	14,007,495	+7.0%
2010	15,175,862	+8.3%
2015	16,187,608	+6.7%
2020	16,992,418	+5.0%

Greater Mexico City and Mexico City (Federal District)

The fast-growing state contains about 14% of the country's population and is one of the most densely populated, with 740 people per square km. Since Mexico City has not absorbed many citizens since 1990, Greater Mexico City's explosive expansion is largely absorbed by the state, along with similar trends in Greater Toluca. Outside of these two metropolitan zones, the state is composed largely of villages. Historically, however, a handful of other states had been larger population centers until the 1960s, today it has by far the highest population in the country. In 2005, 85% of the population lived in urban centers, and 39% were born in other parts of Mexico.

Five ethnicities are native to the state: the Mazahua, the Otomi, the Nahuas, the Matlazincas and the Ocuitecos or Tlahuicas. There are also communities of Mixtecs, Zapotecs, Totonaca, Mazateca, Mixe, Purépecha and Maya. According to the 2005 census, the state has 312,319 people who speak an indigenous language, which is about 3 out of every 100 people. Two-thirds of those speaking an indigenous language also speak Spanish.

According to the 2020 Census, 1.74% of the state of Mexico's population identified as Black, Afro-Mexican, or of African descent.

== Education ==
The state has over three million students who attend about 15,000 schools from kindergarten to high school. It is the largest school system in the country after that of Mexico City. However, as late as 1990, there were over half a million people who were illiterate over the age of 15.

The state university is the Universidad Autónoma del Estado de México (UAEM) which offers 48 majors. This and other institutes of higher education have an enrollment of over 100,000 students. The beginnings of this institution go back to 1828 when the first Instituto Literario for the state was established in what is now the borough of Tlalpan in Mexico City. It was re-established in Toluca in 1833. In 1886, the name was changed to the Instituto Científico y Literario. In 1943, the institution gained autonomy from direct state control, and in 1956, it was reorganized as the UAEM. In 1964, the Ciudad Universitaria on the west side of Toluca was constructed.

Another important public university is the Universidad Autónoma de Chapingo, located in Texcoco. It is an agricultural college offering technical and bachelor's degrees. The school began as the Escuela Nacional de Agricultura (National School of Agriculture), which was founded in 1854 at the Monastery of San Jacinto in Mexico City. The school was moved in 1923 to the ex-Hacienda of Chapingo by President Álvaro Obregón. One distinguishing feature of the campus is the mural done in the old chapel, now the University Ceremonies Room, by Diego Rivera called "Tierra Fecundada" (Fertile Land). It is considered one of Rivera's best works. More recently, the school acquired an unnamed mural by Luis Nishizawa. This work depicts the agriculture of Mexico in both the past and the present. It is placed in a building that is commonly called "El Partenón". Other important educational institutions include the Universidad Technológica del Sur del Estado de Mexico Universidad Tecnológica del Sur del Estado de México and a campus of the ITESM Tecnológico de Monterrey Campus Toluca.

Recently, the Tecnológico de Estudios Superiores de Ecatepec (TESE) has become relevant due to the number of students, careers, and location.

== Infrastructure ==
=== Transport ===
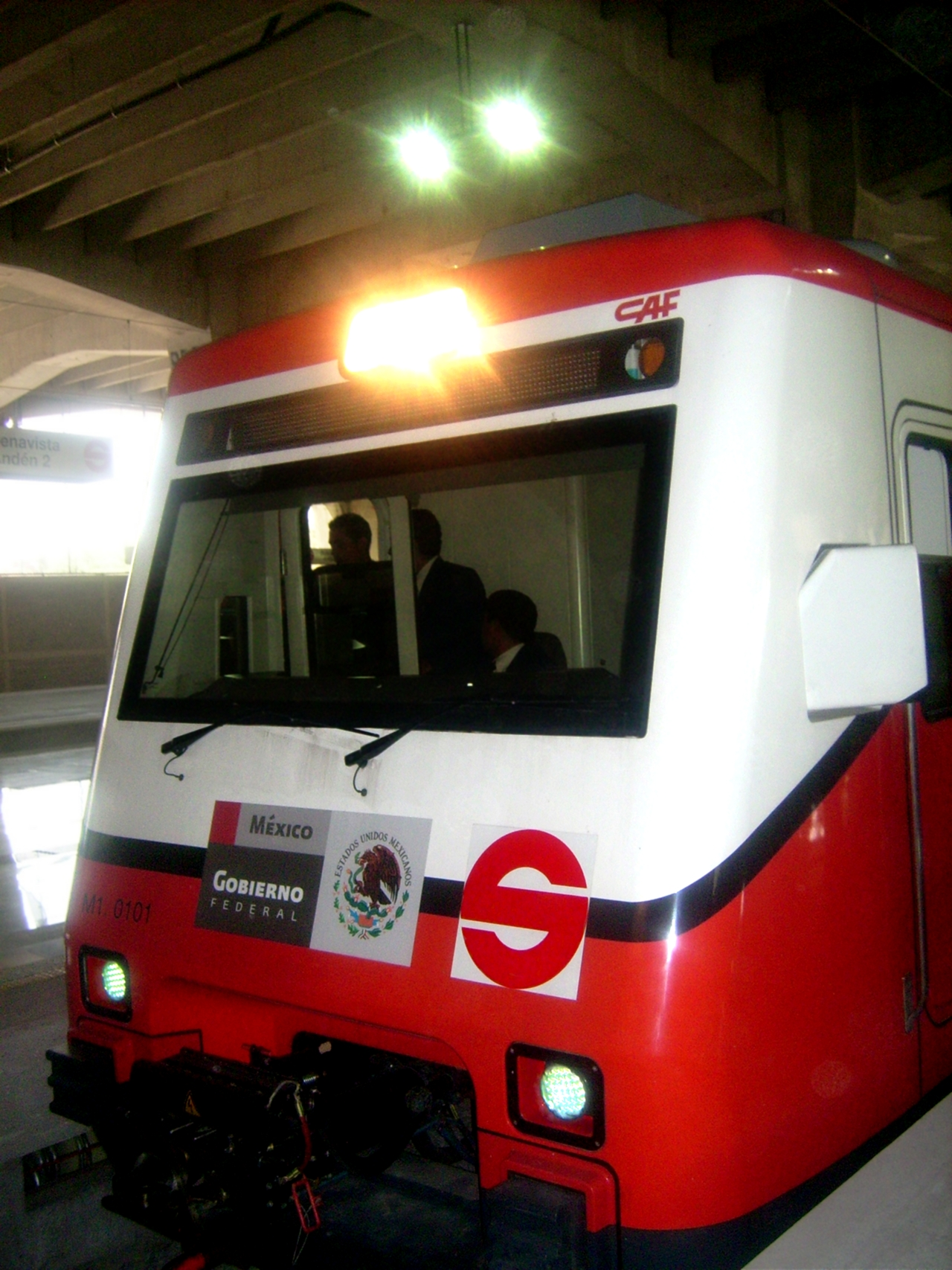
Ferrocarril Suburbano

The state contains 9,723 km of highways with about 90% being state and 10% federal. There are 1227.4 km of rail line and two airports, "Lic. Adolfo López Mateos" in Toluca and "Dr. Jorge Jiménez Cantú" in Atizapán de Zaragoza. Helicopter facilities exist in Chimalhuacán and Jocotitlán. Toluca Airport had served as a major 2nd airport for Mexico City, with coaches, especially Volaris running between the two, but in recent years the popularity dwindled. However, with the new airport plans for the capital canceled, Toluca Airport looks again to capitalize on congestion at Mexico City International Airport, and potentially again with Tren Interurbano.

The Ferrocarril Suburbano is a commuter rail line that connects downtown Mexico City with northern Mexico State municipalities. Service began operations in 2008 with the Buenavista Lechería line. The Buenavista-Cuauhtitlan line was inaugurated in 2009, bringing the total rail ine to 27 km serving communities such as Tultitlán, San Rafael, Tlanepantla and others.

==== Airports ====
- Aeródromo de Valle de Bravo
- Base Aérea Militar N.º 1 de Santa Lucía (Only military use)
- Felipe Ángeles International Airport
- Toluca International Airport
- Atizapan de Zaragoza Airport (Aeropuerto Nacional Jorge Jiménez Cantú)

=== Media ===
The state contains 23 radio stations and 29 television stations (2 local and public and 27 affiliates). The information out there is that the two public stations (radio and television) are "Radio Mexiquense" and "Mexiquense Televisión".

Newspapers of Estado de México include Amanecer de México, Antesala la Verdad Sin Complicaciones, Aventuras de Vaqueros, De los Municipios Conurbados Imagen, Diario Puntual, El Diario de Toluca , El Heraldo de Toluca , El Sol de Toluca, Extra de El Sol, Global Energy, Impulso, Metro, Milenio Estado de México, Solo Ofertas, and Tollocan a 8 Columnas.

== Economy ==
The state provides 9.7% of the country's gross national product, with over 12% of all of Mexico's active workforce employed in the state. The most important sector of the economy is industry and manufacturing, with over 10% of the state's land urbanized. The State of Mexico ranks second in the country for industrial output. The most important industries include chemicals, food products, textiles, paper products, metalworks, and the construction and maintenance of transport vehicles. This sector employs the highest percentage of the population at 27.7%.

The next largest employer is commerce at 21.5%. One important segment of this sector is the hotel and restaurant industry. Outside of the metropolitan areas, tourism is an important element in the state economy, with attractions such as Valle de Bravo, Teotihuacan, Ixtapan de la Sal, and others.

Most of the state's land is devoted to agriculture (38.1%) or forest (34.9%). Much of these crop forest lands are ejido or communal lands. The State of Mexico is the main producer of cut flowers in the country, with the municipality of Villa Guerrero producing up to 75% of Mexico's total floral output. The main crop is corn, with peas, barley, beans, potatoes, alfalfa, wheat, avocados and guava also grown. Livestock is raised on about 17% of the state's farmland, with cattle being the most important animal. Almost all of the forest lands in the state are used for producing forestry products such as wood and paper. However, this sector only employs 1.3% of the state's population.

Other sectors of the economy include financial services, employing 21.4% of the population, and transportation which employs 14.4%. While mining has been historically important, today it is only a minor activity despite residual deposits of gold, silver, lead, and other minerals.

=== Tourism ===
==== Archaeological sites ====
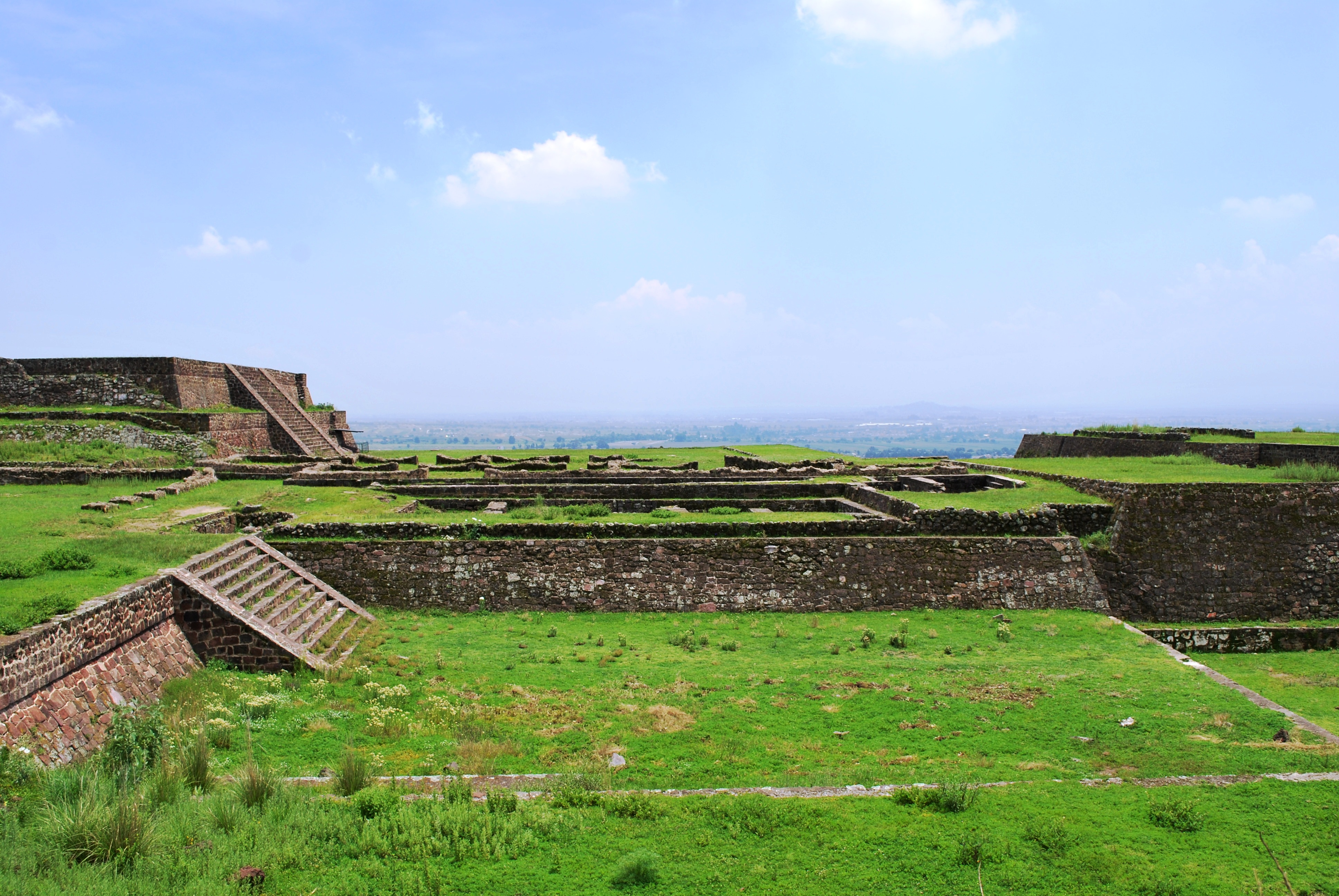
Serpent Square in Teotenango

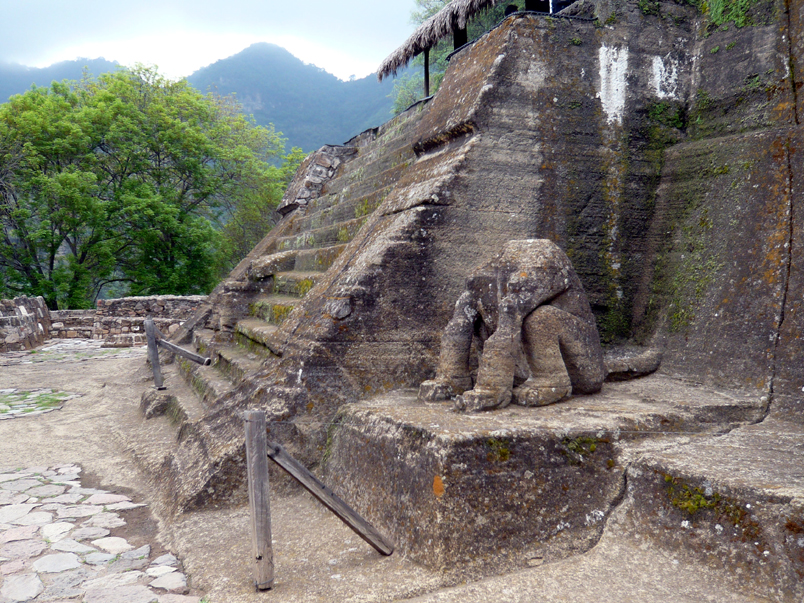
Malinalco ruins

Main archaeological sites include Teotihuacan, Malinalco, Teotenango, and Calixtlahuaca. The best-known and most important of these is the massive Mesoamerican Teotihuacan, with thousands visiting it each year. This city predates the Aztecs and the Toltecs, and is distinguished by two large pyramids, the Pyramid of the Sun and the Pyramid of the Moon.

In Malinalco, the archeological site is officially called the Cuauhtinchan Archeological Zone but it is more commonly called the Cerro de los Idolos. The site is located on a cliff overlooking the town. The visible complex dates from the Aztec Empire but the site's use as a ceremonial center appears to be much older. The main building served as a sanctuary for Aztec warriors. This complex has been compared to Ellora in India, Petra on the shores of the Dead Sea and Abu Simbel in Egypt.

Teotenango was an important pre-Hispanic fortified city located in the southern part of the Valley of Toluca. It was initially founded during the last stages of the Teotihuacan civilization by a group generally referred to as the "Teotenancas." Later, the Matlatzincas conquered the city and expanded it. The city existed for about 1,000 years, being abandoned only after the Spanish Conquest of the Aztec Empire. In the 15th century, it and the rest of the southern Toluca Valley was conquered by the Aztecs. In the 16th century, the Spanish took over, forced the residents to abandon the old city in favor on a new settlement on the valley floor.

Calixtlahuaca is another Matlazinca site located just outside the city of Toluca. The site is at least 3,000 years old and shows Teotihuacan, Toltec and Aztec influences. Located on the skirts of the Tenismó mountain, the most outstanding structure is the temple dedicated to Ehécatl, or Quetzalcoatl in his wind god aspect.

==== Spanish colonial and other historical sites ====
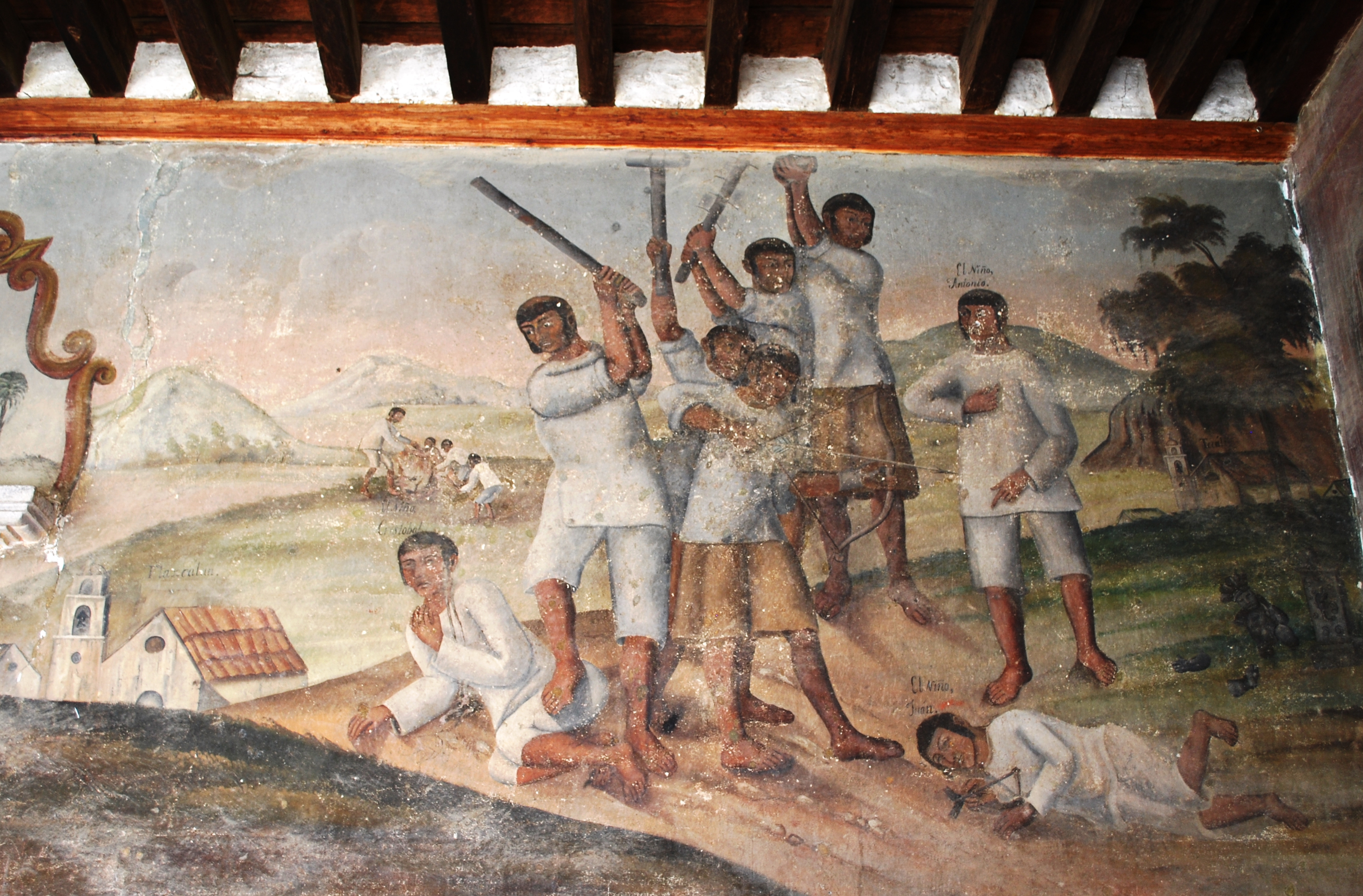
16th century mural of child martyrs at Ozumba

Most of the state's colonial attractions are promoted through the "Pueblos con Encanto" program. These include the monasteries and churches located in towns such as de Acolman, Aculco, Amanalco, Amecameca, Ayapango, El Oro, Ixtapan de la Sal, Malinalco, Metepec, Otumba, Temascalcingo, San Juan Teotihuacán, Tlalmanalco, Tonatico and Villa del Carbón. Other colonial structures can be found in Ozumba, Toluca and the cities that surround Mexico City.

The state has twenty-six museums and 543 libraries dependent on the Instituto Mexiquense de Cultura. Major institutions include the Centro Cultural Mexiquense and the Notary Archive, the Executive and Legislative Archives in Toluca.

==== Natural landmarks ====
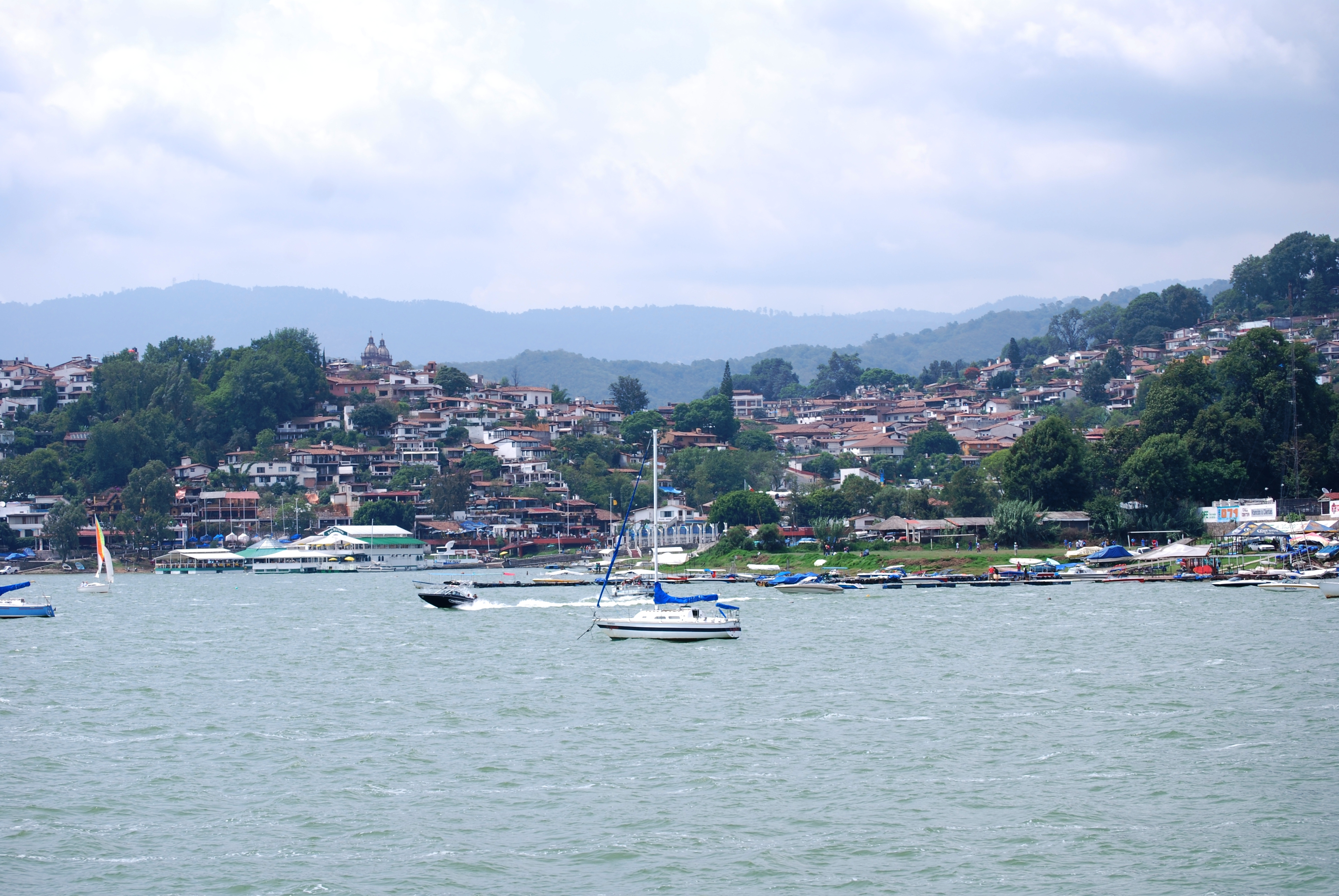
Bravo Valley panorama from Lake Avandaro

The natural feature most closely associated with the state is the Nevado de Toluca or Xinantécatl volcano, which is just south of the capital of Toluca. This extinct volcano rises 4,690 masl, making it the fourth highest peak in Mexico. At the top is a very large crater that contains two lakes called the Laguna del Sol and the Laguna de la Luna. The volcano and its immediate surroundings are part of the Nevado de Toluca National Park and the Los Venado National Park.

Valle de Bravo along with neighboring Lake Avandaro is a major weekend getaway for many in Mexico City and Mexico State. The town is filled with red tile roofs and stone paved streets and has been named a "Pueblo Magico" by the federal tourism agency. The lake is a result of the damming of a regional river and is home to more than forty nautical clubs.

The Grutas de la Estrella is located in the far south of the state on the border with Guerrero. It is a series of live caves in which running water creates formations, some of which are called "The Mammoth", the "Bride and Groom", "The Hand" and "The Palace". They have lighting and other infrastructure as well as guided tours.

Most of the other natural attractions are situated on water sources. Ixtapan de la Sal and Tonatico are noted for their hot-water springs and water parks. Ixtapan de la Sal has attracted the construction of spas and water parks. Tonatico has the fifty-meter high El Salto Waterfall. The Lagunas de Zempoala (Zempoala Lakes) are located on the Santiago Tianguistenco-Cuernavaca highway. The area has forests and cabins. The Isla de la Aves (Island of the Birds) is located in a lake in the municipalities of Atlacolmulco and Timilpan and has an aviary.

Chalma

Chalma is a small community, which is part of the municipality of Malinalco. Its small population is almost completely dedicated to the pilgrims who come to visit the Sanctuary of Chalma, the second most important pilgrimage site in Mexico. The sanctuary is dedicated to an image of what many people describe as a "black Christ" on a cross that legend says miraculously appeared in an area cave where the worship of a deity commonly known as Oxtoteotl used to take place. Actually, Oxtoteotl is an aspect of Tezcatlipoca, the "Smoking Mirror", and the "black Christ" is really Tezcatlipoca, which the Spanish friars superimposed on the existing representation of Tezcatlipoca to convert the natives. Pilgrimages to this Christian sanctuary follow many of the patterns of the prehispanic rituals, including walking the narrow paths to the town itself, bathing in the waters of a special fresh-water spring, and dancing at the sanctuary.

==== Others ====
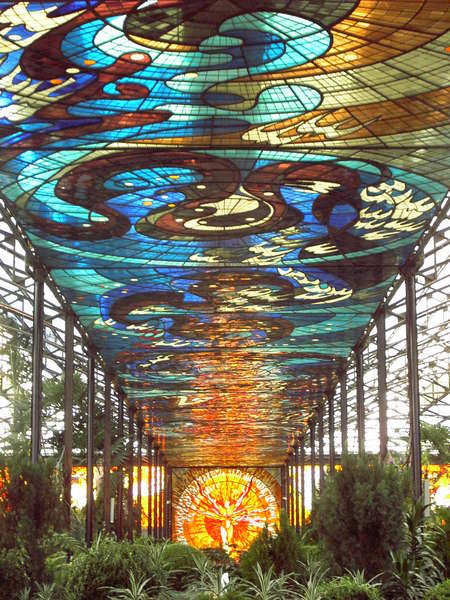
View of the interior of the Cosmovitral with the Sun Man in the background

To honor the native peoples of the area, there are the Centro Ceremonial Otomi in Temoaya and the Centro Ceremonial Mazahua in San Felipe del Progreso. Both of these have museums, auditoriums, and handcraft centers, as well as large forested areas for camping and hiking. Both were built to honor and preserve these indigenous cultures.

Zacango is the state's major zoo with over 2,000 species from all over the world. It is located fourteen km from the city of Toluca in the municipality of Calimaya. It is one of the few zoos in Mexico where all the animals live in natural-like enclosures.

The Cosmovitral is a stained glass mural as well as the name of a building and botanical garden located in Toluca. The building takes its name from the murals which are set in the building's huge windows and on the ceiling. The building originally was constructed in 1910 as the 16 de Septiembre Market, but when this was closed in 1975, Leopoldo Flores successfully convinced the city government to convert the building into a space for art. The Cosmovitral is located downtown, on the corner of Juárez and Lerdo de Tejada streets. The best known aspect of this work is the Hombre Sol or Sun Man. Each year on the spring equinox, the sun aligns with this panel of the stained glass work. This image has become one of the symbols of the state.

== Culture ==
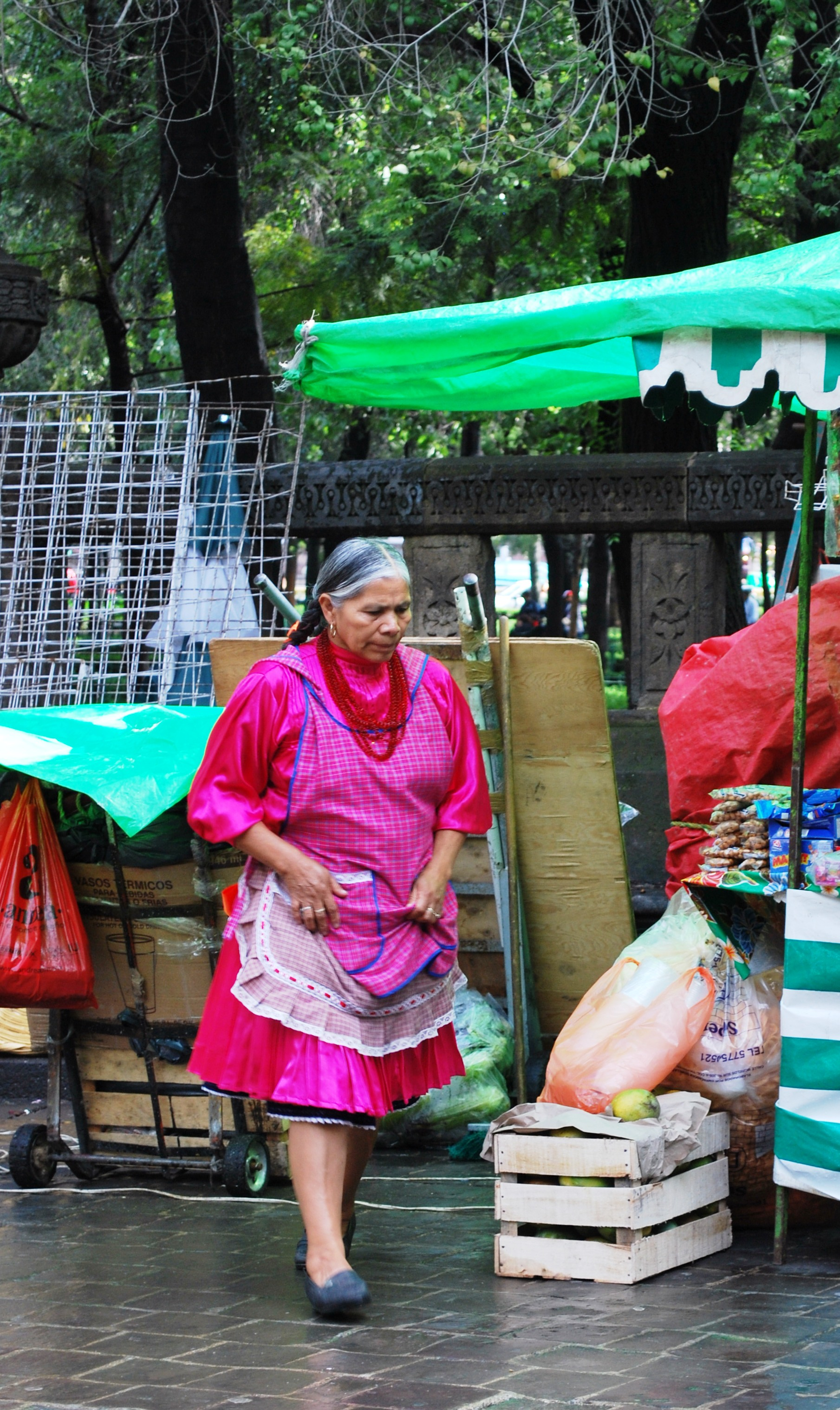
Mazahua woman in Mexico City. The Mazahuas originate in the State of Mexico and are a prevalent cliché about the indigenous peoples in Mexico City due to their high migration elsewhere

Ceramics have been made in the Toluca Valley region since far into the pre-Hispanic period, mostly by Matlatzincas and Nahuas. The tradition continued into the colonial period although it much changed in both technique and design. Today both manufactured and handcrafted ceramics are produced in the state. The most traditional handcrafted wares are produced in places such as Metepec, Valle de Bravo, Texcoco, and Almoloya de Juárez among others. The best-known pottery and ceramics locale is Metepec, which specializes in large decorative pieces and sculptures called Trees of Life. Cooking utensils are made as well.

Objects made from precious metals such as silver are a specialty of the Mazahua people of the Toluca Valley. One specialty is jewelry and other decorative objects made with fine silver or gold wire. One community associated with this work is San Felipe del Progreso, where both wire and hammered items are made. Other communities of metalworkers exist in Naucalpan and Ciudad Nezahualcóyotl. In addition to jewelry, items such as bells, sculptures, religious paraphernalia, and more can be found.

Waxworks is dedicated mostly to the making of decorative and aromatic candles. These range from simple to elaborately carved samples. These are mostly made in Amecameca, Tenango del Valle and Toluca.

The making of piñatas, decorative cut-outs, and other objects from paper and/or cardboard is known in Acolman, Metepec, Toluca, Huixquilucan, Nezahualcoyotl and Otumba. This tradition dates back to pre-Hispanic times with bark paper, but newer materials have been incorporated since then. For example, paper cut-out banners, or papel picado, were originally done with crepe paper (called "papel chino" in Spanish), but today it can be seen done on thin plastic sheets.

The making of fireworks is best known in Tultepec in the municipality of Lerma. Not only are firecrackers and rockets made, but elaborate contraptions with firecrackers placed to move the parts when lit are made as well. These can be called "castillos" (castles) or "toritos" (little bulls) depending on their shape. These are used during religious and secular festivals such as Saints' Day and Independence Day. Tultepec holds a fireworks festival each year.

Other crafts practiced in the state include the making of candies, basketry, artistic ironwork, and items from bone, horn, stone, and wood.

Traditional dances performed in the state include the Danza de los Concheros, Danza de Moros y Cristianos, Doce Pares de Francia, Morisma, and Santiagos. One particular to Mexico State is the El Tzimare-cu, which is performed by the Otomi communities in Xonacatlán, Villa Cuauhtemoc, and Temoaya.

The state is known for its red and black moles, the barbacoa of Capulhuac and Tenango del Valle, the chorizo sausage of Toluca, and the cheese products of Ayapango and Aculco. Beverages include pulque and "tecui."

Major festivals and fairs in the state include the Feria de San Isidro Labrador, an agricultural fair in Metepec; the Festival de la Quimera, a cultural fair in Metepec; the Feria Internacional del Caballo horse fair in Texcoco; the Feria de la Nuez (Nut Fair) in Amecameca; the Festival de las Almas and Fiesta de San Francisco de Asis in Valle de Bravo; and the Feria de Alfeñique, which sells candies and other traditional goods for Day of the Dead.

The Orquesta Sinfónica del Estado de México or Mexico State Symphonic Orchestra was established in 1971 by Enrique Bátiz Campbell. It is based in Toluca in the Felipe Villanueva Hall. It has given performances in various parts of both the state and nation of Mexico. It has made more recordings than any other state orchestra in the country, and in the 2000s it made its first appearances outside of Mexico in the United States and Europe.

== Major municipalities ==
- Ecatepec de Morelos
- Nezahualcóyotl
- Naucalpan de Juárez
- Toluca
- Tlalnepantla de Baz
- Chimalhuacán
- Cuautitlán Izcalli
- Atizapán de Zaragoza
- Tultitlán
- Ixtapaluca
- Nicolás Romero
- Tecámac
- Valle de Chalco Solidaridad
- Chalco
- Coacalco de Berriozábal

== Twinning and covenants ==
Nuevo León

== Notable people ==
- Chimalxochitl II (13th-14th c.) - Queen consort of Cuautitlán
- Sor Juana Ines de la Cruz (1648-1695) - Feminist writer, poet and philosopher
- Nezahualcoyotl (1402-1472) - King of Texcoco
- Enrique Peña Nieto - Former president of Mexico from 2012-2018 and former governor of the state

== See also ==
- Administrative divisions of Mexico
