= Greater Mexico City =

Conurbation centered around Mexico City

Coordinates: 19°25′57.07″N 99°7′59.37″W

- Conurbation
- Zona metropolitana de la Ciudad de México
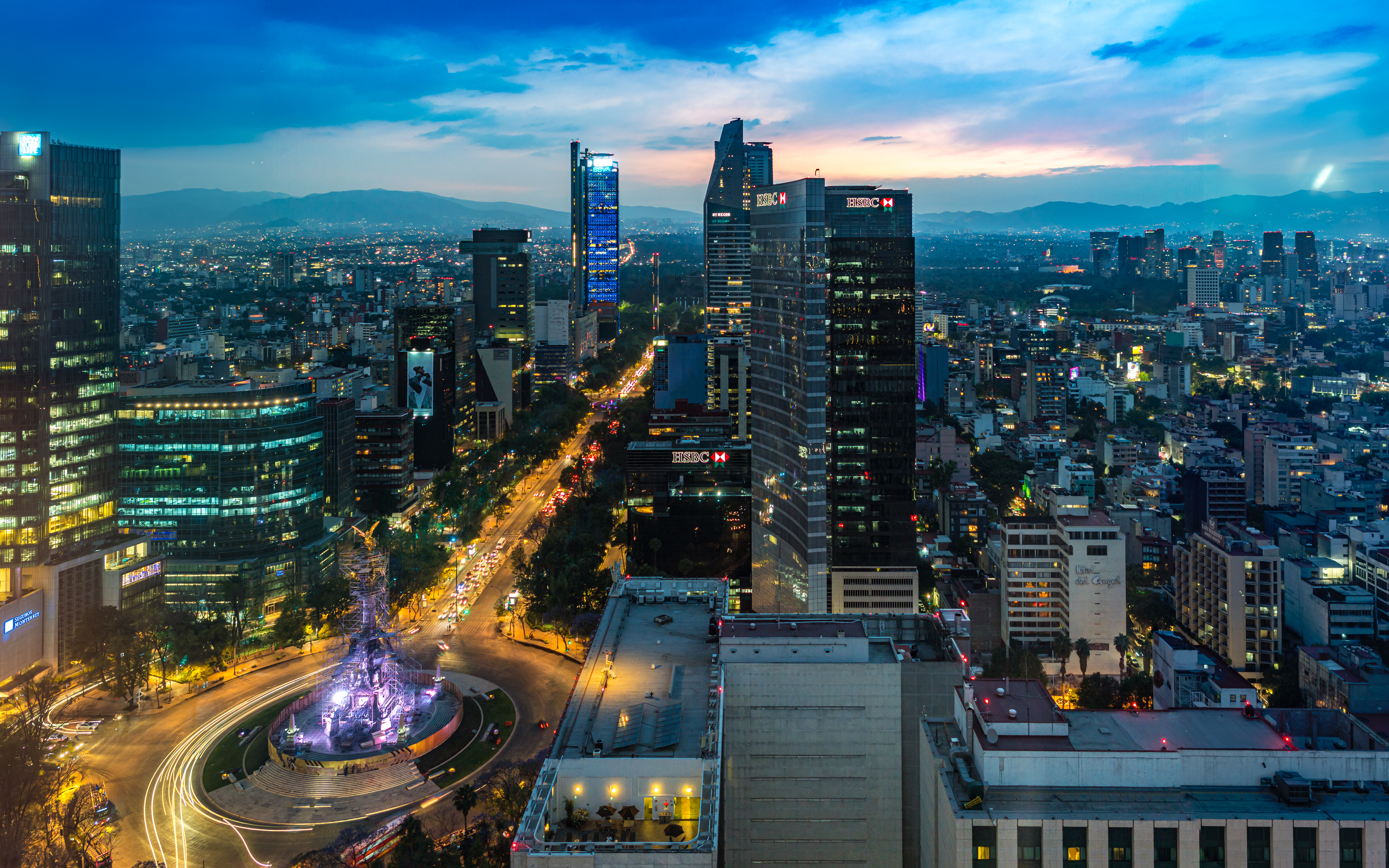
- Mexico City

- Federal District (now Mexico City) and State of Mexico
- Interactive map of Greater Mexico City
- Country: Mexico
- Federative Entities: Mexico City; State of Mexico; Hidalgo; Morelos
- Principal cities: Mexico City; Ecatepec de Morelos; Texcoco de Mora; Ciudad Nezahualcóyotl; Naucalpan de Juarez; Tlalnepantla de Baz; Tultitlán de Mariano Escobedo; Tecámac; Atizapán de Zaragoza; Coacalco de Berriozábal; Cuautitlán; Cuautitlán Izcalli; Valle de Chalco Solidaridad; Huixquilucan de Degollado

Area
  - Metro: 7,866 km^{2} (3,037 sq mi)

Population (2020)
  - Metro: 21,436,911 (2nd in the Americas)
  - Metro density: 2,700/km^{2} (7,000/sq mi)

GDP (Nominal, 2024)
  - Metro: MXN 8.13 trillion (US$401.28 billion)
- Time zone: UTC–06:00 (Zona Centro)

Greater Mexico City is the conurbation around Mexico City, officially called the Metropolitan Area of Mexico City (Spanish: Zona metropolitana de la Ciudad de México). As of 2026, it encompasses Mexico City itself and 84 adjacent municipalities of the State of Mexico, Hidalgo and Morelos, thus becoming the country’s first and only four-state metropolitan area.

Mexico City's metropolitan area is the economic, political, and cultural hub of Mexico. In recent years it has reduced its relative importance in domestic manufacturing, but has kept its dominant role in the country's economy thanks to an expansion of its tertiary activities. The area is also one of the powerhouse regions of Latin America, generating approximately $200 billion in GDP growth or 10 percent of the regional total.

As of 2020, 21,436,911 people lived in Greater Mexico City, making it the largest metropolitan area in North America. Covering an area of 7,866.1 square kilometres (3,037.1 sq mi), it is surrounded by thin strips of highlands separating it from other adjacent metropolitan areas, altogether making up the Mexico City megalopolis.

== Definition ==
The phenomenon of conurbation in Mexico is relatively recent, starting in the 1940s. Mexico City became the first metropolitan area in the country when its urban core spread beyond the borders of the Federal District into the municipality of Naucalpan in the State of Mexico. From that date, there have been different proposals to establish the limits of the growing conurbation of Mexico City, and different definitions were used unofficially as the city continued to grow: between 1950 and 1980, the conurbation extended to dozens of municipalities in the State of Mexico and the population trebled.

The first official definition of Greater Mexico City was coined in 2004. A joint effort between the National Population Council (CONAPO), the National Institute of Statistics and Geography (INEGI) and the Ministry of Social Development (SEDESOL) named the 16 boroughs of Mexico City and 59 municipalities in the State of Mexico and Hidalgo as the Metropolitan Area of the Valley of Mexico. This definition was also agreed by the government of Mexico City and the government of the State of Mexico on December 22, 2005. As per the agreement, most urban planning projects were to be administered by Metropolitan Commissions.

As a result of the Political Reforms enacted in 2016, Mexico City is no longer designated as a Federal District and became a city, a member entity of the Mexican federation, seat of the Powers of the Union and the capital of Mexico. Mexico City is divided in 16 boroughs, officially called demarcaciones territoriales, substituting the old delegaciones.

In 2020, the name was changed from Metropolitan area of the Valley of Mexico to the Metropolitan area of Mexico City, as some parts of the metropolitan area in the north of the State of Mexico are a part of the Cuenca de México (Basin of Mexico) instead, and because it is still centered on Mexico City.

== Subdivisions ==
According to the latest definition by the Secretariat of Agrarian, Land, and Urban Development, the Metropolitan area of Mexico City is formed by the following subdivisions in Mexico City, the State of Mexico, Hidalgo and Morelos:

=== Mexico City ===
Borough	Population (2020)	Population (2010)	Change	Land area		Population density (2020)
Borough	Population (2020)	Population (2010)	Change	km^{2}	sq mi	Population density (2020)
Álvaro Obregón	759,137	727,034	+4.4%	95.9	37.0	7,915.9/km^{2} (20,502.1/sq mi)
Azcapotzalco	432,205	414,711	+4.2%	33.5	12.9	12,901.6/km^{2} (33,415.1/sq mi)
Benito Juárez	434,153	385,439	+12.6%	26.7	10.3	16,260.4/km^{2} (42,114.3/sq mi)
Coyoacán	614,447	620,416	−1.0%	53.9	20.8	11,399.8/km^{2} (29,525.2/sq mi)
Cuajimalpa	217,686	186,391	+16.8%	71.2	27.5	3,057.4/km^{2} (7,918.6/sq mi)
Cuauhtémoc	545,884	531,831	+2.6%	32.5	12.5	16,796.4/km^{2} (43,502.6/sq mi)
Gustavo A. Madero	1,173,351	1,185,772	−1.0%	87.9	33.9	13,348.7/km^{2} (34,573.0/sq mi)
Iztacalco	404,695	384,326	+5.3%	23.1	8.9	17,519.3/km^{2} (45,374.7/sq mi)
Iztapalapa	1,835,486	1,815,786	+1.1%	113.2	43.7	16,214.5/km^{2} (41,995.5/sq mi)
La Magdalena Contreras	247,622	239,086	+3.6%	63.4	24.5	3,905.7/km^{2} (10,115.7/sq mi)
Miguel Hidalgo	414,470	372,889	+11.2%	46.4	17.9	8,932.5/km^{2} (23,135.2/sq mi)
Milpa Alta	152,685	130,582	+16.9%	298.2	115.1	512.0/km^{2} (1,326.1/sq mi)
Tláhuac	392,313	360,265	+8.9%	85.9	33.2	4,567.1/km^{2} (11,828.7/sq mi)
Tlalpan	699,928	650,567	+7.6%	314.5	121.4	2,225.5/km^{2} (5,764.1/sq mi)
Venustiano Carranza	443,704	430,978	+3.0%	32.5	12.5	13,652.4/km^{2} (35,359.6/sq mi)
Xochimilco	442,178	415,007	+6.5%	114.1	44.1	3,875.4/km^{2} (10,037.1/sq mi)
Mexico City	9,209,944	8,851,080	+4.1%	1,494.3	577.0	6,163.4/km^{2} (15,963.1/sq mi)

=== Hidalgo ===
Municipality	Population (2020)	Population (2010)	Change	Land area		Population density (2020)
Municipality	Population (2020)	Population (2010)	Change	km^{2}	sq mi	Population density (2020)
Atitalaquia	31,525	26,904	+17.2%	64.2	24.8	
Atotonilco de Tula	62,470	31,078	+101.0%	31	11.97	2,015.2/km^{2} (5,219.2/sq mi)
Tepeji	90,546	80,612	+12.3%	393.4	151.9	
Tezontepec	13,032	11,654	+11.8%	133.6	51.6	
Tizayuca	168,302	97,461	+72.7%	76.7	29.61	2,194.3/km^{2} (5,683.2/sq mi)
Tlaxcoapan	28,626	26,758	+6.98%	79.3	30.6	
Tolcayuca	21,362	13,228	+61.5%	120.8	46.6	
Tula de Allende	115,107	103,919	+10.8%	305.8	118.1	
Hidalgo	230,772	128,539	+79.5%	107.7	41.6	2,194.3/km^{2} (5,683.2/sq mi)

=== State of Mexico ===
Municipality	Population (2020)	Population (2010)	Change	Land area		Population density (2020)
Municipality	Population (2020)	Population (2010)	Change	km^{2}	sq mi	Population density (2020)
Acolman	171,507	136,558	+25.6%	86.9	33.6	1,973.6/km^{2} (5,111.6/sq mi)
Atenco	75,489	56,243	+34.2%	87.6	33.8	861.7/km^{2} (2,231.9/sq mi)
Atizapán de Zaragoza	523,674	489,937	+6.9%	92.9	35.9	5,637.0/km^{2} (14,599.7/sq mi)
Chalco	400,057	310,130	+29.0%	225.2	87.0	1,776.5/km^{2} (4,601.0/sq mi)
Chiautla	30,045	26,191	+14.7%	20.1	7.8	1,494.8/km^{2} (3,871.5/sq mi)
Chicoloapan	200,750	175,053	+14.7%	41.3	15.9	4,860.8/km^{2} (12,589.3/sq mi)
Chiconcuac	27,692	22,819	+21.4%	6.8	2.6	4,072.4/km^{2} (10,547.3/sq mi)
Chimalhuacán	705,193	614,453	+14.8%	54.8	21.2	12,868.5/km^{2} (33,329.2/sq mi)
Coacalco	293,444	278,064	+5.5%	35.0	13.5	8,384.1/km^{2} (21,714.8/sq mi)
Cocotitlán	15,107	12,142	+24.4%	14.8	5.7	1,020.7/km^{2} (2,643.7/sq mi)
Coyotepec	40,885	39,030	+4.8%	39.9	15.4	1,024.7/km^{2} (2,653.9/sq mi)
Cuautitlán	178,847	140,059	+27.7%	40.9	15.8	4,372.8/km^{2} (11,325.5/sq mi)
Cuautitlán Izcalli	555,163	511,675	+8.5%	110.1	42.5	5,042.4/km^{2} (13,059.6/sq mi)
Ecatepec	1,645,352	1,656,107	−0.6%	156.2	60.3	10,533.6/km^{2} (27,282.0/sq mi)
Huehuetoca	163,244	100,023	+63.2%	119.8	46.3	1,362.6/km^{2} (3,529.2/sq mi)
Huixquilucan	284,965	242,167	+17.7%	141.2	54.5	1,715.1/km^{2} (4,442.0/sq mi)
Isidro Fabela	11,929	10,308	+15.7%	79.7	30.8	149.7/km^{2} (387.7/sq mi)
Ixtapaluca	542,211	467,361	+16.0%	324.0	125.1	1,673.5/km^{2} (4,334.3/sq mi)
Jaltenco	28,217	26,328	+7.2%	4.7	1.8	6,003.6/km^{2} (15,549.3/sq mi)
Jilotzingo	19,877	17,970	+10.6%	116.5	45.0	170.6/km^{2} (441.9/sq mi)
La Paz	304,088	253,845	+19.8%	37.1	14.3	8,196.4/km^{2} (21,228.7/sq mi)
Melchor Ocampo	61,220	50,240	+21.9%	14.0	5.4	4,372.9/km^{2} (11,325.6/sq mi)
Naucalpan	834,434	833,779	+0.1%	157.9	61.0	5,284.6/km^{2} (13,687.0/sq mi)
Nextlalpan	57,082	34,374	+66.1%	54.7	21.1	1,043.5/km^{2} (2,702.8/sq mi)
Nezahualcóyotl	1,077,208	1,110,565	−3.0%	63.3	24.4	17,017.5/km^{2} (44,075.1/sq mi)
Nicolás Romero	430,601	366,602	+17.5%	232.5	89.8	1,852.0/km^{2} (4,796.8/sq mi)
Papalotla	4,862	4,147	+17.2%	3.2	1.2	1,519.4/km^{2} (3,935.2/sq mi)
San Martín de las Pirámides	29,182	24,851	+17.4%	69.9	27.0	417.5/km^{2} (1,081.3/sq mi)
Tecámac	547,503	364,579	+50.2%	156.9	60.6	3,489.5/km^{2} (9,037.8/sq mi)
Temamatla	14,130	11,206	+26.1%	29.2	11.3	483.9/km^{2} (1,253.3/sq mi)
Temascalapa	43,593	35,987	+21.1%	164.6	63.6	264.8/km^{2} (685.9/sq mi)
Tenango del Aire	11,359	10,578	+7.4%	38.0	14.7	298.9/km^{2} (774.2/sq mi)
Teoloyucan	65,459	63,115	+3.7%	31.0	12.0	2,111.6/km^{2} (5,469.0/sq mi)
Teotihuacán	58,507	53,010	+10.4%	83.2	32.1	703.2/km^{2} (1,821.3/sq mi)
Tepetlaoxtoc	32,564	27,944	+16.5%	178.9	69.1	182.0/km^{2} (471.4/sq mi)
Tepetlixpa	20,500	18,327	+11.9%	43.1	16.6	475.6/km^{2} (1,231.9/sq mi)
Tepotzotlán	103,696	88,559	+17.1%	207.1	80.0	500.7/km^{2} (1,296.8/sq mi)
Tequixquiac	39,489	33,907	+16.5%	122.5	47.3	322.4/km^{2} (834.9/sq mi)
Texcoco	277,562	235,151	+18.0%	428.1	165.3	648.4/km^{2} (1,679.2/sq mi)
Tezoyuca	47,044	35,199	+33.7%	16.3	6.3	2,886.1/km^{2} (7,475.1/sq mi)
Tlalmanalco	49,196	46,130	+6.6%	160.2	61.9	307.1/km^{2} (795.4/sq mi)
Tlalnepantla de Baz	672,202	664,225	+1.2%	80.4	31.0	8,360.7/km^{2} (21,654.2/sq mi)
Tonanitla	14,883	10,216	+45.7%	9.0	3.5	1,653.7/km^{2} (4,283.0/sq mi)
Tultepec	157,645	91,808	+71.7%	26.8	10.3	5,882.3/km^{2} (15,235.0/sq mi)
Tultitlán	516,341	524,074	−1.5%	66.0	25.5	7,823.3/km^{2} (20,262.4/sq mi)
Valle de Chalco	391,731	357,645	+9.5%	46.7	18.0	8,388.2/km^{2} (21,725.5/sq mi)
Villa del Carbón	51,498	44,881	+14.7%	303.3	117.1	169.8/km^{2} (439.8/sq mi)
Zumpango	280,455	159,647	+75.7%	223.6	86.3	1,254.3/km^{2} (3,248.5/sq mi)
State of Mexico	12,107,682	10,887,209	+11.2%	4,845.9	1,871.0	1,974.0/km^{2} (5,112.6/sq mi)

== Geography and environment ==
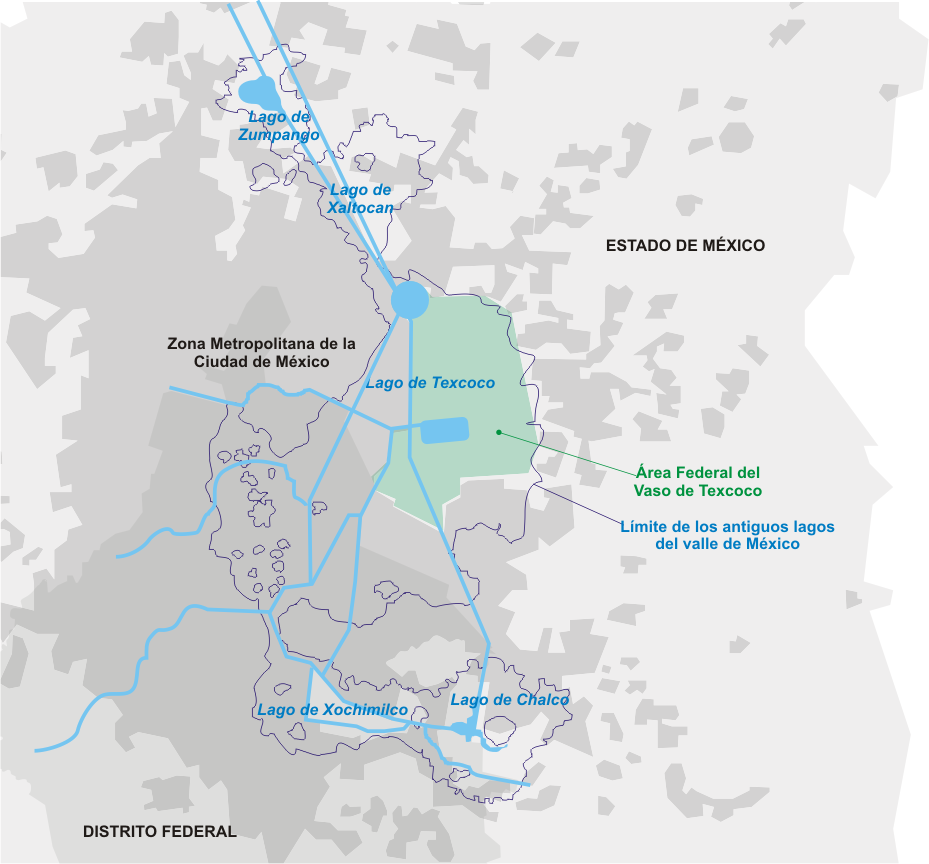
Comparative map of the original extent of the system of lakes and the current extent of today's urban area

Greater Mexico City spreads over the valley of Mexico, also called the valley of Anáhuac, a 9,560 km^{2} (3,691 sq mi) valley that lies at an average of 2,240 m (7,349 ft) above sea level. Originally, a system of interconnected lakes occupied a large area of the valley, of which Lake Texcoco was the largest. Mexico City was built on the island of Tenochtitlan in the middle of the lake. During conquest of the Aztec Empire the dikes that protected the city from recurrent floods were destroyed and colonial authorities preferred to drain the water of the lake, which was, for the most part, shallow. In 1900 president Porfirio Díaz inaugurated the Valley's System of Drainage that hinders the growth of water bodies in the valley (and prevents floods). The basin of the valley of Mexico was thus integrated artificially to the Moctezuma river basin which connects to the Pánuco River. The last remnants of the system of lakes are found in the boroughs of Xochimilco and Tláhuac, and in the municipality of Atenco.

The valley of Mexico is surrounded by mountains on all four sides creating a basin with only one small opening at the north, trapping all exhaust emissions of the city. At the southern part of the basin the mountain range reaches an altitude of 3,952 m (12,965 ft) above sea level; and to the east, the volcanoes reach an altitude of more than 5,000 m (16,000 ft). The region receives anti-cyclonic systems, producing weak winds that do not allow for the dispersion of accumulated air pollutants, produced by the 50,000 industries operating in Greater Mexico City and the 4 million vehicles circulating in its roads and highways.

There are several environmental programs in operation in all municipalities of Greater Mexico City. One of them is Hoy No Circula (known in English as "One Day without a Car"), whereby some vehicles with certain ending numbers on their license plates are not allowed to circulate on certain days in an attempt to cut down on pollution and traffic congestion. The program groups vehicles by their ending license plate digits and every weekday vehicles having any of the day's two Hoy no circula digits are banned from circulating. For instance, on Fridays, vehicles with plates ending in 9 or 0 may not drive. This program is controversial since it has resulted in households buying additional vehicles: new cars for higher-income families, or very old and cheap —and thus more polluting— vehicles. Moreover, newer vehicles are exempt from complying with the program—in that they are manufactured with stricter pollution-reduction equipment—a move said to have been pushed by automakers to boost sales of new vehicles.

Other environmental programs include the IMECA (Índice Metropolitano de la Calidad del Aire, "Metropolitan Index of Air Quality") a real-time monitoring of the concentrations of several pollutants on the atmosphere of the valley of Mexico. If the IMECA values reach a critical level, an environmental contingency is declared whereby Hoy No Circula is extended to two days per week, industrial activities are reduced, certain gas power plants shut down, and elementary school entry hours are changed. There has been a decrease in the number of environmental contingencies since the 1990s from more than 5 to only one or zero a year. This is due, among other reasons, to the development of one of the most developed air quality surveillance systems in the region, and to the implementation of industrial controls and to the relocation of some factories.

== Political administration ==
Like it is the case with all trans-municipal metropolitan areas in Mexico, there is no elected government institution in charge of administering the entire metropolitan area. Each municipality is autonomous to administer its local affairs, regulated by the government of the states they belong to. However, unlike some other large metropolitan areas that are entirely contained in one state, like Greater Guadalajara and Greater Monterrey in which the state government coordinates metropolitan activities, Greater Mexico City spreads over three federal entities—two states and the Mexico city and therefore most of the metropolitan projects have to be agreed upon by government officials of each federal entity and/or overseen by the federal government—since the budget of the Federal District is approved by the Congress of the Union, being the capital of the federation—or through metropolitan commissions.

== Economy ==
	GDP nominal (bil. MXN)	GDP nominal (bil. US$)
Mexico City	5,041.647	275.352
State of Mexico	3,092.683	168.909
Greater Mexico City	8,134.330	444.261

From 1940 and until 1980, Greater Mexico City experienced an intense rate of demographic growth concurrent with the economic policy of import substitution. Mexican industrial production was heavily centralized in Greater Mexico City during this period which produced intense immigration to the city. Close to 52% of the economically active population of Greater Mexico City worked in the industry sector in 1970. This situation changed drastically during the period of 1980 to 2000, in which the economic based shifted to the service sector which in 2000 employed close to 70% of the economically active population in the conurbation. The annual rate of growth decreased sharply as well as the regional and national patterns of immigration: residents are moving out of the core city to the suburbs or to nearby cities, whereas the northern states now receive a larger number of immigrants as new hubs of industrial production. Greater Mexico City's main industries are now related to trade, financial services, insurance companies, telecommunications, informatics and transportation. In spite of the recent shifts in economic production and the decentralization of the economic activity promoted by the government, Greater Mexico City's share of total economic activity in the country is still high, though decreasing. Mexico City proper alone produces $170 billion or 17% of the nation's Gross Domestic Product, larger than any of the states.

== Demographics ==
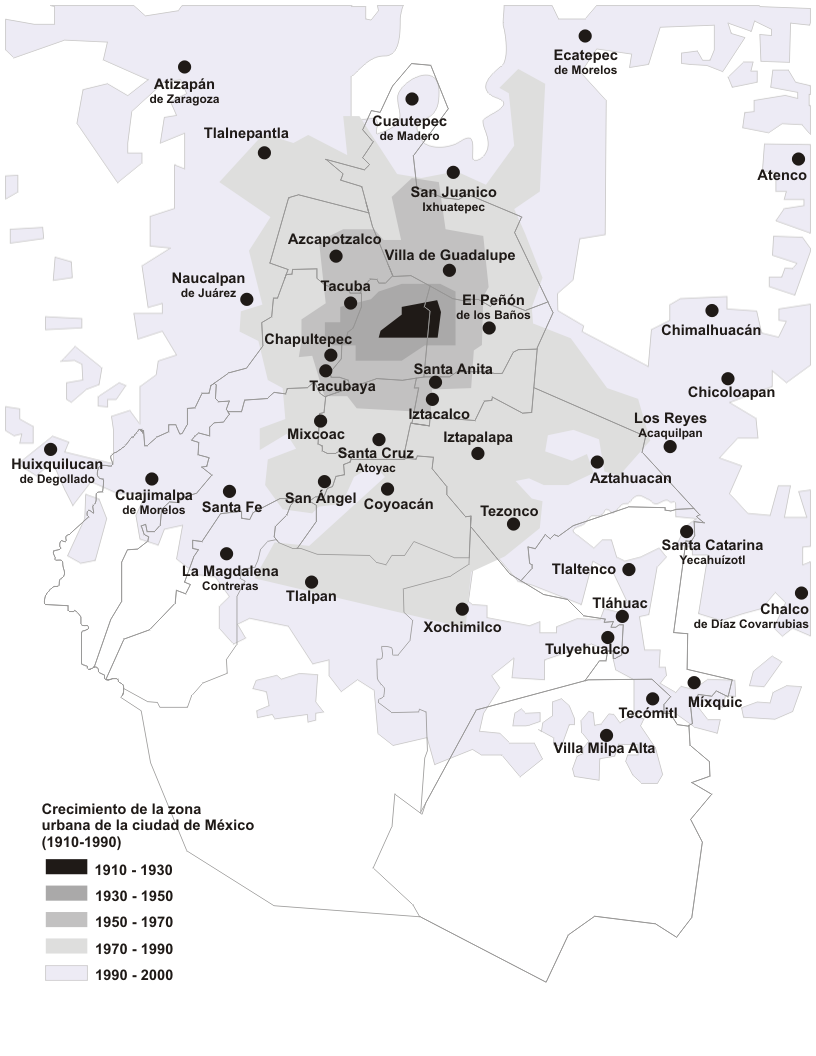
Growth of the urban area from 1900 to 2000

Greater Mexico City is the largest metropolitan area in Mexico and the area with the highest population density. According to the 2020 census, 21,436,911 people lived in this metropolitan area, of which 9,209,944 live in Mexico City proper. This means that about 72% (12.2 million) of the State of México's population live in municipalities that are part of Greater Mexico City's conurbation.

Greater Mexico City was the fastest-growing metropolitan area in the country until the late 1980s. Since then, and through a policy of decentralization in order to reduce the environmental pollutants of the growing conurbation, the annual rate of growth of the agglomeration has decreased, and it is among the lowest of all metropolitan areas in Mexico. The net migration rate of Mexico City proper from 1995 to 2000, however, was negative, which implies that residents are moving to the outer suburbs of the metropolitan area, or to other states of Mexico. In addition, some inner-city suburbs in Mexico City are losing population to outer city suburbs, indicating a continual expansion of Greater Mexico City.

=== Human development index ===
The Mexico City boroughs are among the subdivisions with the highest human development in Mexico. Benito Juárez has the highest index (0.944), similar to Australia or Netherlands, while 4 other boroughs are in the national Top 10.

Most metropolitan municipalities in the State of Mexico have a high human development index. Huixquilucan has the highest value with a 0.842 index, the highest in the whole state. Other municipalities with a high index are Coacalco, Cuautitlán Izcalli, Cuautitlán, Texcoco, Tlalnepantla de Baz and Atizapán de Zaragoza. Even though some of these municipalities have some of the wealthiest neighborhoods of the metropolitan area, there is a huge contrast with peripheric low-income suburbs known as "marginal zones" or "lost cities". Some examples are the wealthy suburb of Tecamachalco next to El Molinito shanty town, both in Naucalpan, or Chamapa next to Bosque Real Country Club in Huixquilucan.

Municipalities to the east of Mexico City, such as Nezahualcóyotl, Ecatepec, Valle de Chalco or Chimalhuacán have lower indexes than those located to the west, but also present high HDI values. The bottom municipalities in terms of HDI are Ecatzingo and Villa del Carbón. However, they are located far away from Mexico City's urban area and are considered eminently rural.

Tizayuca has one of the highest HDIs in Hidalgo, although the index is below Greater Mexico City's average.

== Landmarks ==
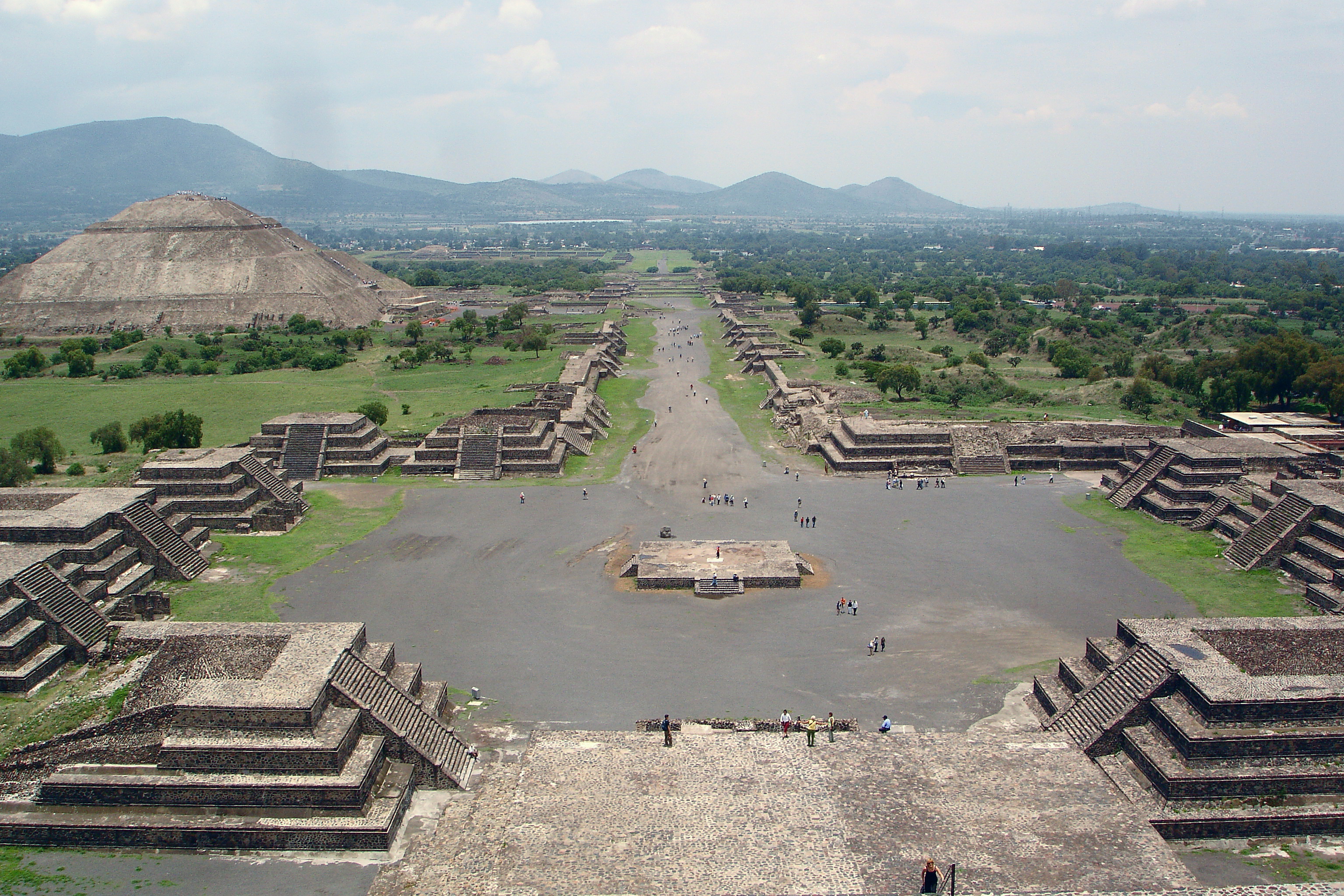
City of Teotihuacan

Important landmarks of Greater Mexico City include the Historic Center of Mexico City, the floating gardens of Xochimilco, the Pre-Hispanic city ruins Teotihuacan, located at the municipality of the same name, all three declared World Heritage sites by UNESCO in 1987. The National Parks at the southern portion of the Federal District (over the mountainous range of Ajusco), the Parks of Popocatépetl and Iztaccíhuatl and the National Reserve of Lake Texcoco are some environmental landmarks of the valley as well.

Map of Greater Mexico City detailing the locations of various pre-Columbian archaeological sites.

== See also ==
- Mexico City megalopolis
- Metropolitan areas of Mexico
- List of metropolitan areas by population
- List of metropolitan areas in the Americas by population
- List of urban agglomerations by population
- List of cities in Mexico
- Demographics of Mexico
- Greater Mexico
