= 14th federal electoral district of the State of Mexico =

Federal electoral district of Mexico

State of Mexico's 14th
- Electoral district of the Chamber of Deputies of Mexico

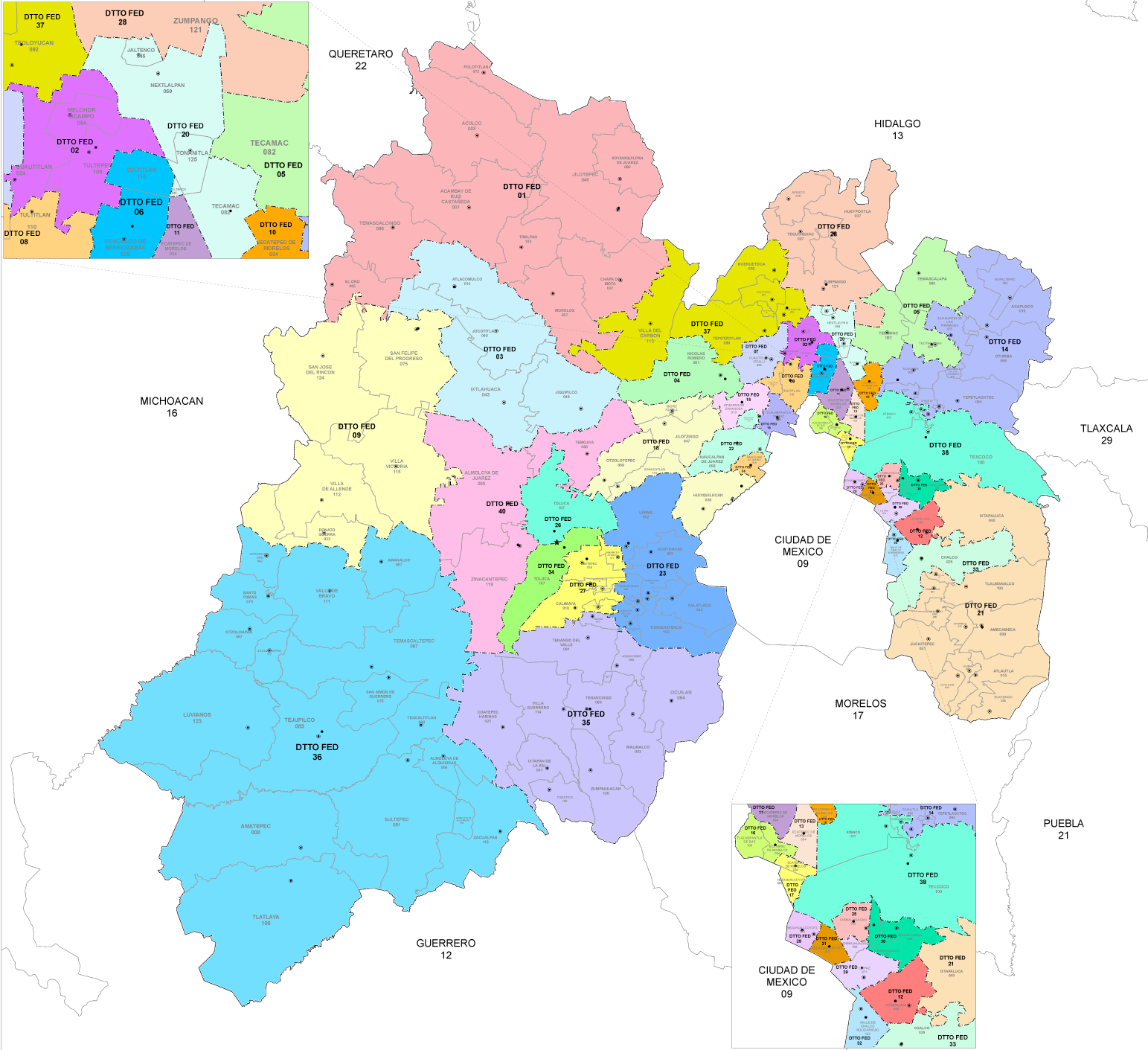
- State of Mexico's districts since 2023

Incumbent
- Member: Claudia Leticia Garfias
- Party: ▌Morena
- Congress: 66th (2024–2027)

District
- State: State of Mexico
- Head town: Tepexpan
- Coordinates: 19°37′N 98°56′W
- Covers: Acolman, Axapusco, Chiautla, Nopaltepec, Otumba, Papalotla, San Martín de las Pirámides, Tepetlaoxtoc, Tezoyuca
- PR region: Fifth
- Precincts: 137
- Population: 363,434 (2020 census)

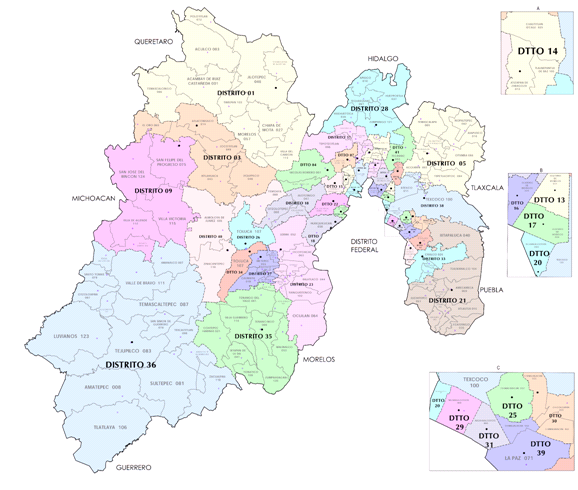
2017–2022 districting scheme

The 14th federal electoral district of the State of Mexico (Spanish: Distrito electoral federal 14 del Estado de México) is one of the 300 electoral districts into which Mexico is divided for elections to the federal Chamber of Deputies and one of 40 such districts in the State of Mexico.

It elects one deputy to the lower house of Congress for each three-year legislative session by means of the first-past-the-post system. Votes cast in the district also count towards the calculation of proportional representation ("plurinominal") deputies elected from the fifth region.

The current member for the district, elected in the 2024 general election, is Claudia Leticia Garfias Alcántara of the National Regeneration Movement (Morena).

== District territory ==
Under the 2023 districting plan adopted by the National Electoral Institute (INE), which is to be used for the 2024, 2027 and 2030 federal elections, the 14th district is located in the north-east of the state, on the border with Tlaxcala and Hidalgo, covering 137 precincts (secciones electorales) across nine of the state's 125 municipalities:

- Acolman, Axapusco, Chiautla, Nopaltepec, Otumba, Papalotla, San Martín de las Pirámides, Tepetlaoxtoc and Tezoyuca.

The head town (cabecera distrital), where results from individual polling stations are gathered together and tallied, is the city of Tepexpan in the municipality of Acolman. In the 2020 census, the district reported a total population of 363,434.

== Previous districting schemes ==
Evolution of electoral district numbers
| | 1974 | 1978 | 1996 | 2005 | 2017 | 2023 |
|---|---|---|---|---|---|---|
| State of Mexico | 15 | 34 | 36 | 40 | 41 | 40 |
| Chamber of Deputies | 196 | 300 | | | | |

Under the previous districting plans enacted by the INE and its predecessors, the 14th district was situated as follows:

2017–2022

Portions of the municipalities of Atizapán de Zaragoza, Tlalnepantla de Baz and Cuautitlán Izcalli. The head town was at Ciudad López Mateos.

2005–2017

The north-west portion of Atizapán de Zaragoza. The head town was at Ciudad López Mateos.

1996–2005

The municipality of Atizapán de Zaragoza in its entirety. The head town was at Ciudad López Mateos.

1978–1996

A portion of the municipality of Tlalnepantla.

== Deputies returned to Congress ==
(Mexico) National parties
- Current
- PAN
- PRI
- PT
- PVEM
- MC
- Morena
- PAZ
- Somos
- Defunct or local only
- PLM
- PNR
- PRM
- PNM
- PP
- PPS
- PARM
- PFCRN
- CON
- PANAL
- PSD
- PES
- PES
- PRD

State of Mexico's 14th district
| Election | Deputy | Party | Term | Legislature |
|---|---|---|---|---|
| 1916 | Enrique A. Enríquez | | 1916–1917 | Constituent Congress of Querétaro |
...
| 1979 | Juan Martínez Fuentes | Institutional Revolutionary Party | 1979–1982 | 51st Congress |
| 1982 | Martín Téllez Salazar | Institutional Revolutionary Party | 1982–1985 | 52nd Congress |
| 1985 | Eduardo Fernando Hernández Mier | Institutional Revolutionary Party | 1985–1988 | 53rd Congress |
| 1988 | José de Jesús Miramontes Jiménez | National Action Party (Mexico) | 1988–1991 | 54th Congress |
| 1991 | Amador Monroy Estrada | Institutional Revolutionary Party | 1991–1994 | 55th Congress |
| 1994 | Rubén Jiménez Leal | Institutional Revolutionary Party | 1994–1997 | 56th Congress |
| 1997 | Eduardo Mendoza Ayala | National Action Party (Mexico) | 1997–2000 | 57th Congress |
| 2000 | Eduardo Arnal Palomera | National Action Party (Mexico) | 2000–2003 | 58th Congress |
| 2003 | Patricia Flores Fuentes | National Action Party (Mexico) | 2003–2006 | 59th Congress |
| 2006 | Carlos Madrazo Limón | National Action Party (Mexico) | 2006–2009 | 60th Congress |
| 2009 | Fausto Sergio Saldaña del Moral | Institutional Revolutionary Party | 2009–2012 | 61st Congress |
| 2012 | Silvia Márquez Velasco | Institutional Revolutionary Party | 2012–2015 | 62nd Congress |
| 2015 | Ingrid Schemelensky Castro | National Action Party (Mexico) | 2015–2018 | 63rd Congress |
| 2018 | Claudia Angélica Domínguez Vázquez | Labour Party (Mexico) | 2018–2021 | 64th Congress |
| 2021 | Ana María Balderas Trejo | National Action Party (Mexico) | 2021–2024 | 65th Congress |
| 2024 | Claudia Leticia Garfias Alcántara | National Regeneration Movement | 2024–2027 | 66th Congress |

== Presidential elections ==
State of Mexico's 14th district
| Election | District won by | Party or coalition | % |
|---|---|---|---|
| 2018 | Andrés Manuel López Obrador | Juntos Haremos Historia | 49.3327 |
| 2024 | Claudia Sheinbaum Pardo | Sigamos Haciendo Historia | 63.9019 |
