= Tepetlaoxtoc de Hidalgo =

Tepetlaoxtoc (de Hidalgo)
- Town & Municipality
- Interactive map of Tepetlaoxtoc (de Hidalgo)
- Coordinates: 19°34′23″N 98°49′13″W
- Country: Mexico
- State: State of Mexico
- Founded: 1114
- Municipal Status: 1820

Government
  - Municipal President: Juan Vázquez González (2006-2009)
- Elevation (of seat): 2,300 m (7,500 ft)

Population (2005) Municipality
  - Municipality: 25,523
  - Seat: 5,602
- Time zone: UTC-6 (Central (US Central))
- Postal code (of seat): 56070

Tepetlaoxtoc de Hidalgo is a town and the seat of the municipality of Tepetlaoxtoc, which contains the archeological site of Tepetlaoxtoc, in the State of Mexico in Mexico. The name Tepetlaoxtoc comes from Náhuatl and means in limestone caves, and is used interchangeably to refer to the town, the municipality and the archeological ruins. 'de Hidalgo' was added to the town's name to honor Miguel Hidalgo who began the Mexican War of Independence. It is located about 100 km northeast of Mexico City.

== The town ==
The location of this town is one of the oldest settlements of the Valley of Mexico. During the era of Teotihuacán, it was part of a city called Patlachique. Because of this association, this area inherited and improved upon Toltec and Chichimeca culture and architecture, whose ruins can still be seen. After the fall of Teotihuacán and Tula, the town came under the rule and influence of a number of other cultures such as the Chimalhuacan, Xaltocan, Zumpango, Tenayuca, and Ayotla most of these being associated with the Náhuatl (Aztec) culture. Tepetlaoxtoc, along with these towns was invaded by the Chichimeca chief Xólotl, whose son Nopaltzin discovered the ruins of the ancient Teotihuacán-era city. The Tepetlaoztoc Codex, also called the Kingsborough Codex, written in 1554, puts the foundation of the ancient city at about 1114, but the Texcoco chronicler Don Fernando de Alva Ixtlixóchitl, puts the foundation date at about 1207. This area never formally became part of the Aztec Empire but during the time of Nezahualcóyotl, the lord of the area was Cocopin, who married a daughter of Nezahualcóyotl, called Azcaxóchitl or Azcasuch, to secure an alliance. She succeeded her husband to the lordship of Tepetlaoxtoc, the only female to ever rule the area. After the Spanish conquest, the lord of the area, Tlilpotonqui, permitted himself to be baptized and called Don Diego, and kept a certain amount of autonomy under Spanish rule. Don Diego ruled over 70 years but left no heirs so this arrangement ended in 1593 when the government passed into the hands of Luis de Tejada.

The friar Domingo de Betanzos chose Tepetlaoxtoc to found a hermitage, small cloister and chapel between 1527 and 1528, which the Indians called Tlaxcantla. The monastery of Santa María Magdalena was founded in 1535, becoming a parish in 1646. The town was an "ayuntamiento" (or seat) by the early 19th century. During the rest of the century, its economy and political importance grew to lead the Congress of the State of Mexico to rename the town Villa (town) de Tepetlaoxtoc de Hidalgo. During the Mexican Revolution, the town was completely destroyed by the Liberation Army of the South (Zapatistas) and was abandoned. While people did eventually return, the town never regained the economic importance it once had.

The population of the town as of 2005 was 5,602 and is located at an altitude of 2300 meters above sea level.

== The municipality ==
As municipal seat, the town of Tepetlaoxtoc de Hidalgo has governing jurisdiction over the following communities: Concepción Jolalpan, Los Reyes Nopala, San Andrés de las Peras, San Bernardo Tlalmimilolpan, San José del Moral (El Moral), San Juan Totolapan, San Nicolás (San Nicolás Altica), San Pedro Chiautzingo, Santo Tomás Apipilhuasco (Santo Tomás), La Trinidad, La Virgen, La Loma (San Isidro), Rancho Maldonado, Atlahutle, San Antonio, Colonia Tulteca Teopan, La Venta (La Loma), El Árbol, La Besana, Las Liebres, Colonia Pinar de Santa Cecilia, La Huerta los Ruiloba, Rancho Molino Blanco, Rancho los Nogales (El Nogal), Rancho el Potrillo, El Revire, Rancho San Gabriel, San Telmo, Santiago Papalotla (Ejido de Papalotla), Rancho el Techachal, Tecorral, Rancho el Cortijo Tetlameya, Rancho Lauro del Río, Rancho el Oasis, Granja María Antonieta, Ejido de San Francisco Tlaltica (Las Joyas), El Tepetloxto (Colonia Lomas de San Gabriel), Rancho Chiconcuajio, La Cuesta, Polvorones, San José Bellavista, Hacienda de la Flor, Rancho San Antonio, El Tetepayo and La Presa. The municipality had a total population of 25,523 people in 2005.

The municipality borders the municipalities of Teotihuacán de Arista, San Martín de las Pirámides, Otumba; Papalotla, Acolman, Chiautla and Texcoco as well as the states of Tlaxcala and Puebla. It has a territory of 172.38 km^{2}. The terrain is hilly with the western part belonging to the Sierra Norte. The highest elevations are (in meter above sea level) Huilotepec (3,550m), Tlamacas (3,340), Montecillo-el Organo (3,100), Huilo Chico (3090), and Tepeyahualco (3000). In 1977, the state government set aside 3,123 hectares in the municipality as the Parque "Sierra Patlachique"(Sierra Patlachique Park).

90% of the municipality's economy is still agricultural, with many rural people living on ejidos and taking secondary work in addition. Despite the ancient ruins, tourism has not been developed here. In addition to the main ruins near the seat, other significant sites include: Texocotla, Texaxal, and Xoxoqui.
