= Carlos Madrazo =

Carlos Madrazo may refer to:

- Carlos A. Madrazo (Carlos Alberto Madrazo Becerra, 1915–1969), Mexican politician, governor of Tabasco
- Carlos Madrazo Limón (born 1952), Mexican politician, senator
- Carlos Armando Madrazo Pintado (born 1940), Mexican politician, deputy for the 23rd federal electoral district of Mexico City
- Carlos Arturo Madrazo Silva (born 1975), Mexican politician, deputy for the 17th federal electoral district of Mexico City
