= Patricia Flores =

Patricia Flores may refer to:

- Patricia Flores Elizondo (born 1968), Mexican politician
- Patricia Flores Fuentes (born 1977), Mexican politician
