= Chiautla =

Chiautla may refer to:

- Chiautla de Tapia, Puebla
- Chiautla, State of Mexico
