= Nopaltepec, State of Mexico =

Nopaltepec
- Municipality
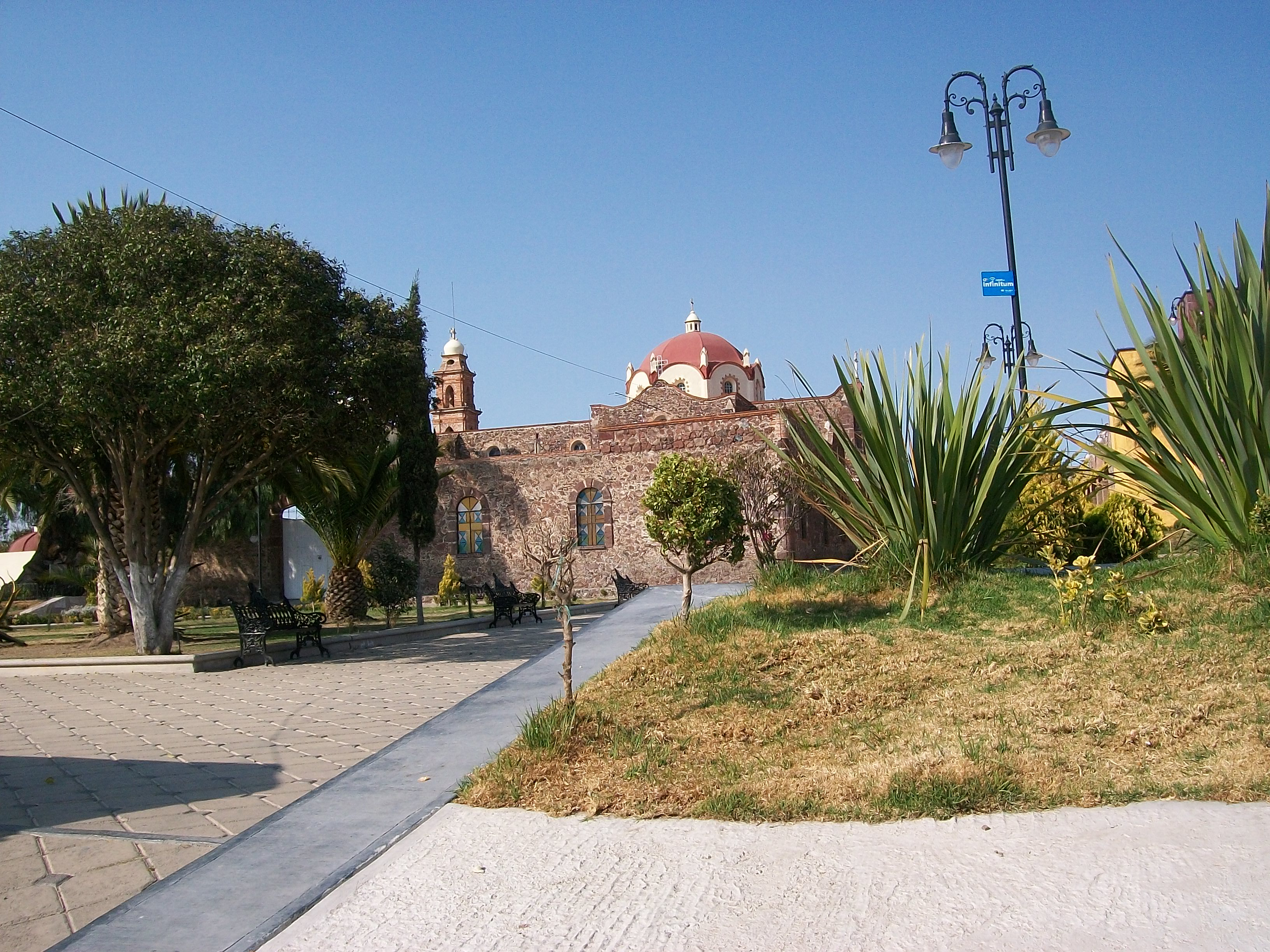

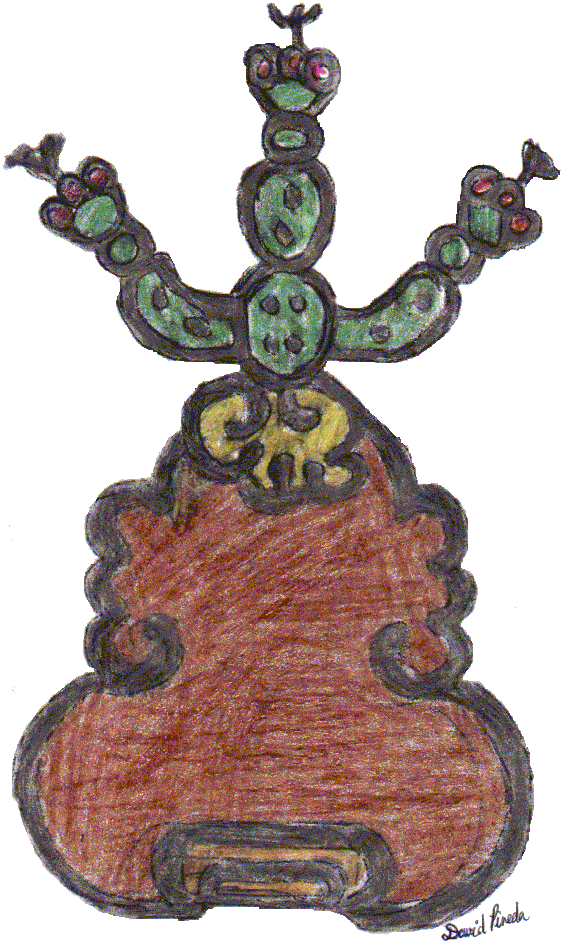
- Coat of arms

- Location within Mexico
- Coordinates: 19°46′55″N 98°42′45″W
- Country: Mexico
- State: State of Mexico
- Municipal Seat: Nopaltepec
- Populated by Chichimecas: 1134
- Part of the Great Otompan Mayoralty: 1535
- Municipality Founded: October 19, 1871

Government
  - Municipal President: Gumaro Waldo López (2006–2009)
- Elevation (of seat): 2,450 m (8,040 ft)

Population (2005) Municipality
  - Municipality: 8,182
  - Seat: 3,224
- Time zone: UTC-6 (Central)
- Postal code (of seat): 55970
- Website: (in Spanish) http://www.nopaltepec.gob.mx/

Nopaltepec is municipality in State of Mexico, Mexico. Its municipal seat and second largest town is the town of Nopaltepec. It is approximately 250 km (160 mi) from Toluca, the state capital. The name derives from Náhuatl meaning "on nopal (paddle cactus) hill". It was originally called "Santa María de la Asunción Nopaltepec" but, after 1960, only Nopaltepec has been used.

== Village ==
The village first appears in records around 1603 though villages in this area have existed since pre-Hispanic times. It is also known as Santa María de la Asunción Nopaltepec. In 1901 the Parish of Nopaltepec is established and was expanded in 1932. The village had a population of 3,224 in 2005.

== The municipality ==
The largest town is San Felipe Teotitlán, followed by the municipal seat Nopaltepec, San Miguel Atepoxco, Ex-hacienda la Puerta, Santa Inés Amiltepec, Ex-hacienda de Tepatepec, Colonia Venta de Cruz, Las Ambrises, and Rancho San Felipe (Moratepec).

The municipality has 87.94 square km of territory and a total population of 8,182 as of 2005. It is bordered by the municipality of Axapusco and the state of Hidalgo.

The municipality is principally rural, mainly flat plateau with small elevations. With no lakes or rivers, all water supplies come from underground aquifers. Its flora is adapted to its semi-arid climate and include: pirúl, mezquite, licorice root, sweet acacia, date palm, maguey, various varieties of nopal, eucalyptus, camphor trees, pine, wild privets, mimosa, ash tree, and ornamental palms. Wild fauna include: rabbits, hares, squirrels, skunks, cacomixtle, tlacuache, chachahuate, lizards, cencuate, trout, rattlesnakes, linger and scorpions. Agriculture is the primary economic activity with the production of cactus fruit, pulque and basic grains for auto-consumption. There is some fish-farming here as well. There is almost no livestock here and only a few home-based workshops producing clothing, plastic items, plumbing, and metalworks.

== History ==
The villages of this area in the pre-Hispanic era, were dominated by the Teotihuacan culture. Around 1134, the Chichimecas migrated here from what is now the north of Mexico, taking over these same villages. What now the municipality was part of the dominion of Xaltoca around 1200 and when this lord fell, the kind King Xolotl consolidated this area along with Teotitln, Atepoxco, as well as other villages of the time. During the Aztec Empire, Nopalteppec was part of the Acolhua region. After the Conquest, the area became part of the "alcaldia mayor" (lit. major mayorship) of Otompan and would remain so throughout the 18th century. The municipality would not be officially declared until 1871 with the name of Santa María de la Asunción Nopaltepec.

The Battle of Venta de Cruz took place here in 1816 as part of the Mexican War of Independence.
