= Acolman =

- Town & Municipality
- Acolman de Nezahuacóyotl
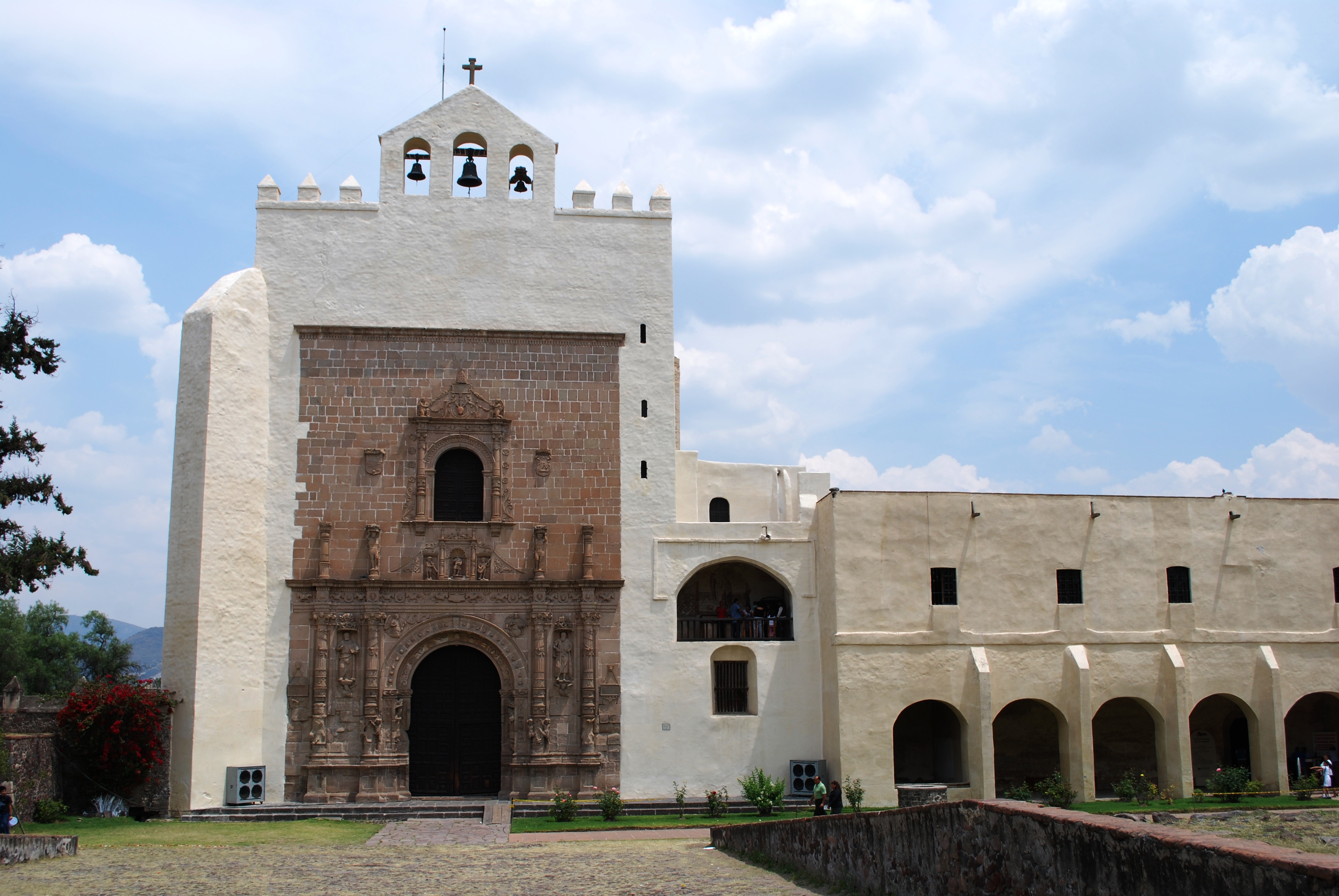
- Facade of the former monastery

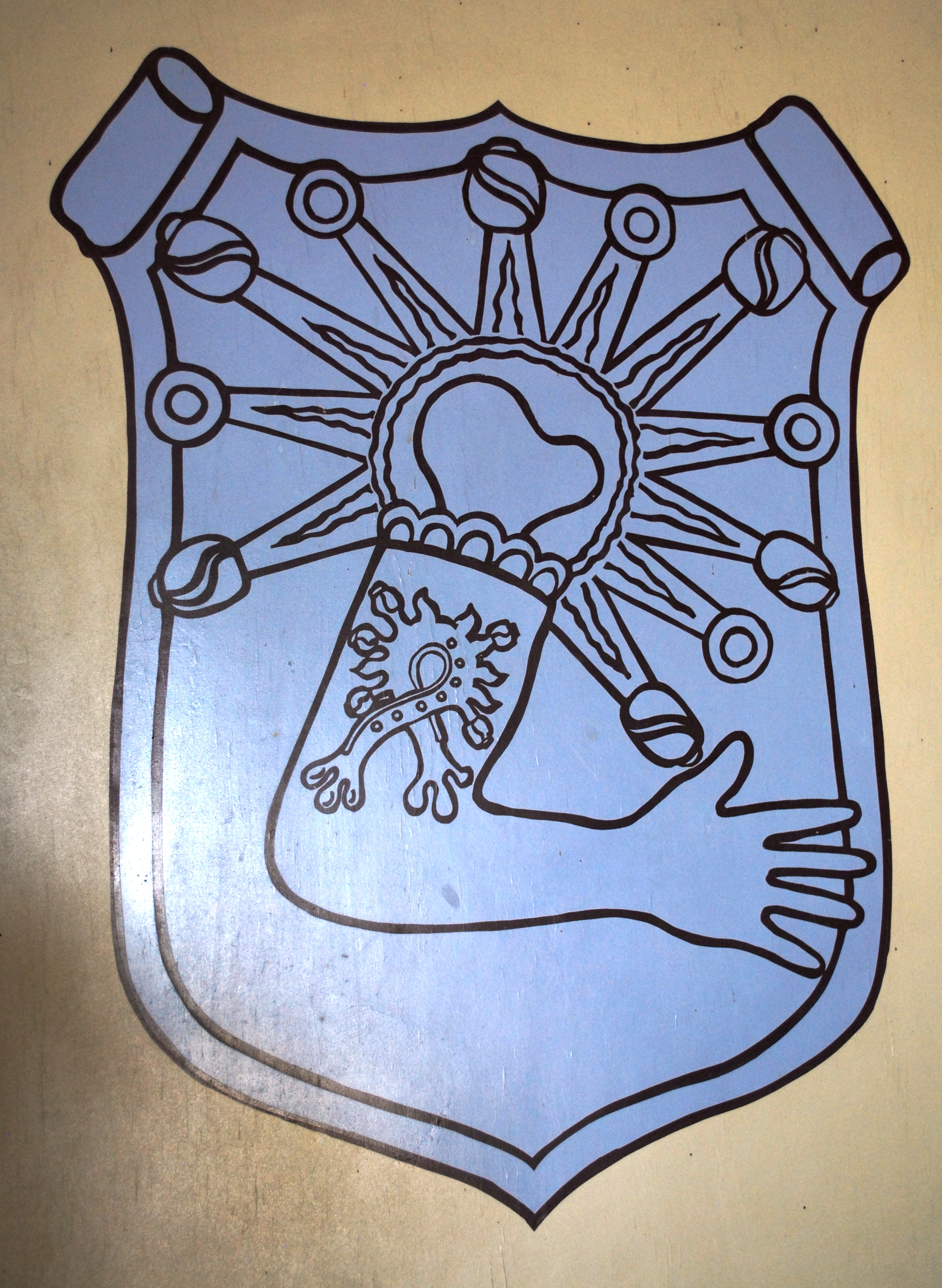
- Coat of arms

- Location in Mexico
- Coordinates: 19°38′18″N 98°54′35″W
- Country: Mexico
- State: State of Mexico
- Founded: 8th century
- Municipal Status: 1820s

Government
  - Municipal President: Roberto Sanchéz Campos

Area
  - Municipality: 86.88 km^{2} (33.54 sq mi)
- Elevation (of seat): 2,254 m (7,395 ft)

Population (2010) Municipality
  - Municipality: 136,558
  - Seat: 5,571
- Time zone: UTC-6 (Central)
- Postal code (of seat): 55870
- Area code: 594
- Website: (in Spanish) /Official site

Acolman de Nezahualcóyotl is a town and municipality located in the northern part of State of Mexico, part of the Greater Mexico City area, just north of the city proper. According to myth, the first man was placed here after being taken out of Lake Texcoco. In the community of Tepexpan, the fossilized bones more than 12,000 years old of a man were found in the 20th century. The settlement was founded in the eighth century and was an important commerce center at the time of the Spanish conquest of the Aztec Empire.

After the Spanish conquest of the Aztec Empire, Acolman became the site of an important Augustinian monastery in the 16th century that still contains important art and architecture from that time period.

== History ==
According to an ancient myth, when the gods created the first man, they took him from the waters of Lake Texcoco and placed him alone in Acolman. The arm of this man, ringed by drops of water from the lake is the Aztec glyph for the site. The glyph can also be seen on the monastery which dominates the landscape here. Acolman is derived from a Nahuatl phrase which has been interpreted in various ways. It may mean "man with hand or arm" or "where man is made." Acolman is the modern name but the settlement has been referred to as Oculma, Axuruman and Aculma in colonial era documents.

The municipality is home of the Tepexpan man, named after the community in which he was found. The Tepexpan man is a Subboreal Holocene human fossilized skeleton that was found in the mid-20th century.

The founding of the settlement of Acolman is attributed to the Acolhuas, a Chichimeca people, around the eighth century. The settlement started out independent but was first conquered by the Huexotzincas and remained subject to one dominion or another since. By the time of the tlatoani Nezahualcoyotl, Acolman was an important town in the Tetzcoco altepetl after it was conquered by the Aztecs in 1396. The town was important because it was the only place in Mesoamerica that specialized in the breeding and raising of dogs (today known as the breed called xoloitzcuintli).

At the time of the Spanish conquest, Acolman was governed by Moctezuma II. After, Acolman became the encomienda of Pedro de Solis de los Monteros and his son Francisco. The Franciscans arrived first, but the Augustinians were in charge of evangelization efforts after 1539, with twenty-four friars in residence by 1580. This order built one of the most important early colonial era monasteries in New Spain here.

The 17th and 18th century was marked by severe floodings issues, which caused widespread damage and population shifts. These floods eventually caused the disappearance of towns near Acolman such as Tlacuilocan, Tzapotla, and Tescazonco. During one of the attempts to control the rivers in the area, a dam was constructed which cause havoc for the area. During one of the floods, the monastery was submerged in over six feet of water, covering the church floor with silt and nearly destroying the cloisters. In the 17th and 18th centuries, epidemics such as smallpox decimated the native population.

After the Mexican War of Independence, Acolman became the seat of the municipality of the same name. In 1876, due to political instability, the seat was temporarily moved to a town called Xometla. In 1877, it returned to Acolman and the appendage "de Nezahualcoyotl" as added.

Another flood affected the municipality in 1925 and affected the monastery, but also spurred the beginning of restoration efforts that would last until the end of the 20th century. The monastery was declared a national monument in 1933.

The torch of the 1968 Summer Olympics passed through here on its way to Mexico City.

== The town and its monastery ==
=== The town ===
The most important feature of the town by far is the former monastery of San Agustin, located next to the main plaza. However, there are some other attractions as well. The Central Library and Casa de la Cultura contain paintings and sculptures by a native of Acolman named Parmeno. At the municipal market, foods such as mixiote, barbacoa, consume and turkey in mole can be found as well as pulque.

Main festivals include the Feast of Saint Nicholas on 10 September, of the Archangel Michael on 29 September and the Virgin of Guadalupe on 12 December. These are celebrated with traditional dances such as Concheros, Arrieros, Contradance, Pastores, Inditos and Teomates as well as fireworks, amusement rides and music.

The most distinguishing festival for the town is the Feria de la Posada y la Piñata (Piñata and Las Posadas Fair), which has been held here every December since 1985. Acolman claims to be the origin of the Las Posadas tradition in Mexico as well as the "cradle" of piñatas, as they have been a tradition here for over 420 years. Both kinds of piñatas, those made with clay pots and those made entirely of paper are created here. Participants gather from various communities in the area and the main event is a piñata contest. There are also horse races, bullfighting, nativity scenes, "pastorelas" a type of play based on the Christmas season, regional dance, and popular music shows. Horse racing is a tradition that dates back to the Mexican Revolution.

=== The monastery ===
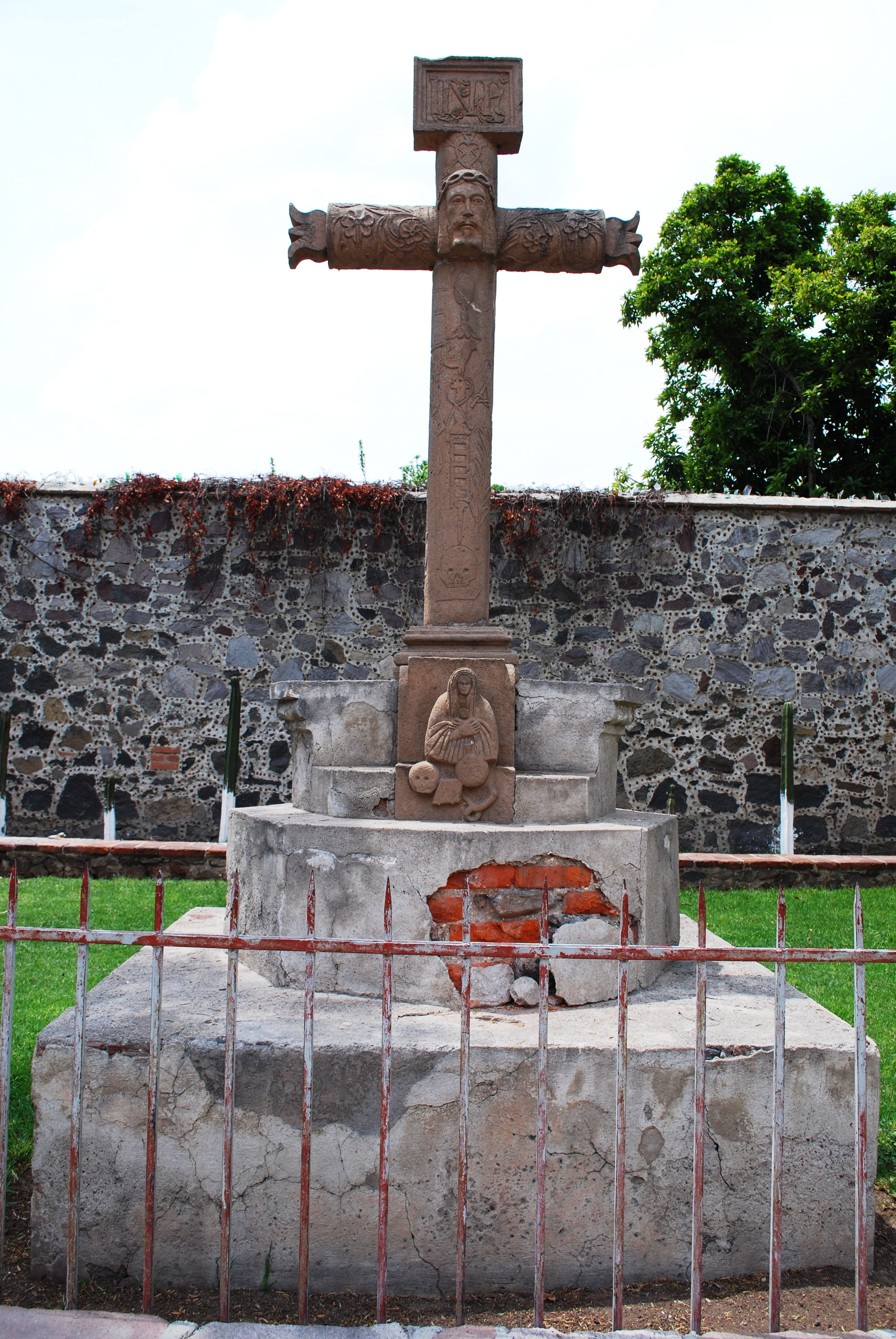
16th century atrium cross

Declared a national monument in 1933, the Monastery of San Agustín was built between 1539 and 1580 with most of the work being done after 1550. The walls are of rubble-stone construction and covered in plaster, topped by battlements, and the overall appearance is that of fortress. The crown of battlements, the single bell tower, the open chapel and the Plateresque facade identify the complex as a classic 16th century religious construction. The fortress appearance of complexes of this time were not literally for protection but rather served to dominate the landscape much as mediaeval castles in Europe did. In areas where there are carefully fitted stones, these stones have been carved. The construction of the monastery is attributed to Andrés de Olmos. Restoration work has been done in this complex since the 1920s, which has revealed all of the church’s facade and the atrium is terraced down to its original level of construction. This has exposed the flood damage from the colonial period. Most of the murals and frescos had been buried under years of plaster and paints before being restored.

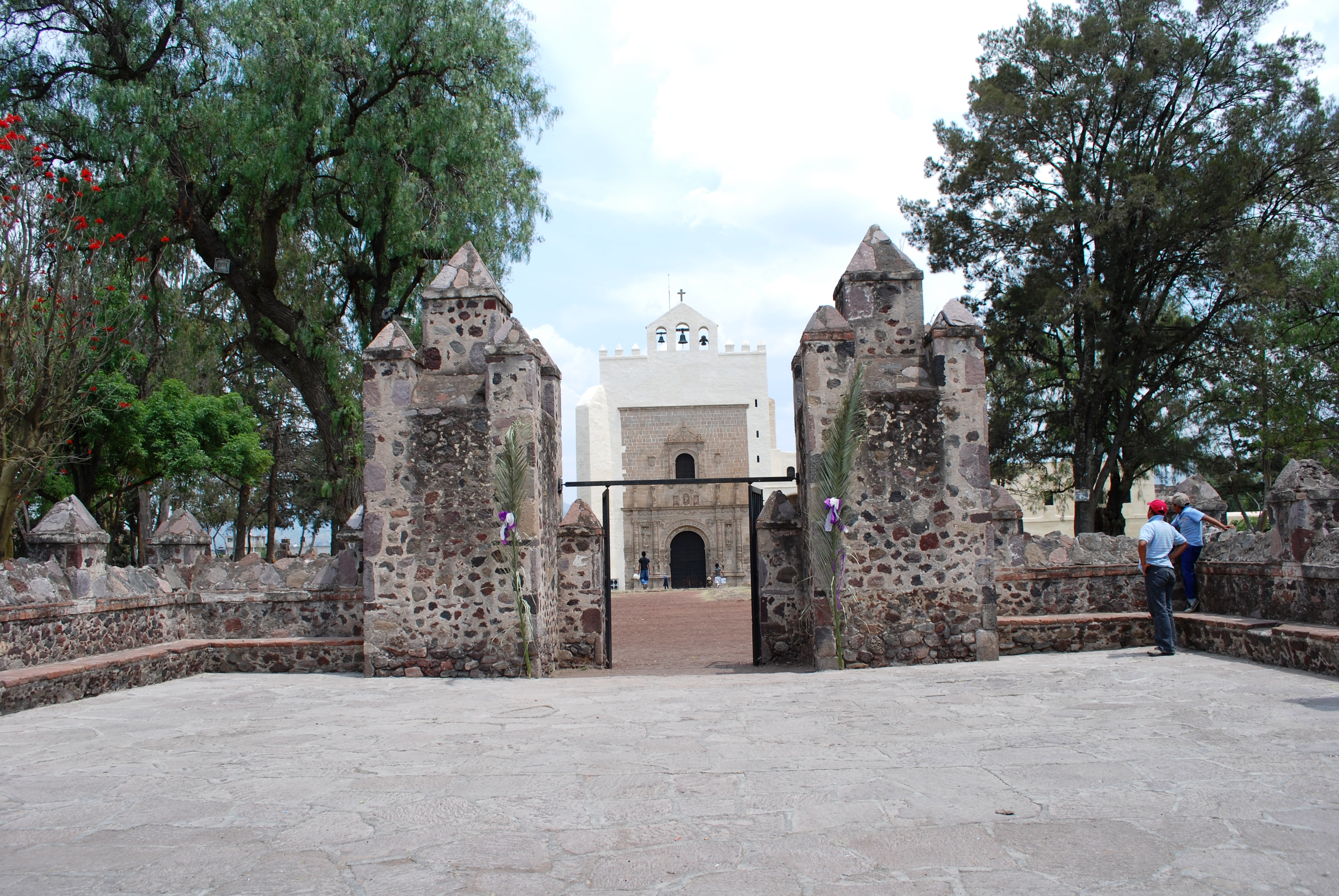
Looking towards the facade of the church from the main gate

The complex is fronted by a large square atrium, and a courtyard before that, the two of which are today separated by a road The most important feature of this atrium area is the 2.4 metres (7 ft 10 in) high stone cross, which is considered to be an important expression of "tequitqui" or Christian art executed by Indian craftsmen from the very early colonial period. The cross was mostly likely erected between the time that the Franciscans occupied the site and before the architectural sculptures of the current complex. The cross is decorated with plants, flowers and flames at the top (which allude to the Passion of Christ) all sculpted into the stone. There is also a melancholy, mask-like face of Christ, with crown of thorns which projects from the center of the cross. At the foot of the stone cross is a Madonna figures who has been identified as the Virgin of Sorrows and even associated with the goddess Coatlicue. At the feet of this Virgin is a weathered stone skull and a serpent, and in her breast is imbedded a dark stone disk. This follows the Aztec tradition of placing jades or other precious stones in their statues to symbolize the soul.

To the back of the atrium area is the main church, with its rose/tan Plateresque facade reminiscent of the Colegiata de Santa María in Calatayud, Spain. The facade has Classical composite columns with Plateresque sections below the ribbon garniture, Saint Paul under a deep, Gothic-like canopy with a Renaissance angel below. The portal has double Renaissance doors under archivolts decorated with fruit. Above the doors are seahorses on the main frieze and Moorish paneling on the doors themselves. This facade was mostly likely created by Spanish craftsmen and had significant influence on other Augustinian church fronts in New Spain, especial at Yuriria and Cuitzeo in Michaocán and at Metztitlán in Hidalgo. The church building is 62.5 metres (205 ft) long, 17.1 metres (56 ft) wide and 21.3 metres (70 ft) high, with the interior walls particularly high The interior vault was modified and the interior pilasters and exterior buttresses were added in 1735. The main altarpiece dates from 1690 and was put here in the 20th century to replace the original. The side altarpieces date from the 18th century. These Baroque altarpieces are all sculpted in wood and gilded, decorated with plants, flower, celestial figures and angels. The presbytery has a late medieval ribbed vault and important frescos in black, white and orange, with images of saints on thrones, priests and Augustine popes.

The small open chapel, or chapel of the Indians is located on the upper part of the wall between the church and the main portal to the cloister area. This chapel contains two murals from the 16th century by unknown authors depicting the Last Judgement and Catherine of Alexandria.

The monastery consists of two cloisters. The Claustro Chico or small cloister is of simple architecture, constructed in stone with a cross in the center which has an anagram of Jesus' name. The Claustro Grande or large cloister (also called the Naranjo or Orange Tree cloister) has a more elaborate Plateresque design with "Isabelino" type columns. The small cloister may date from the Franciscan period or might be part of the early Augustinian church. Flatted arches on piers with a barrel-vaulted corridor on the ground level and a wood-roofed second level suggest the simple construction of the very early colonial period. Primitive frescos decorate the walls. The stone cross here is very similar to the Franciscan cross at one of the earliest monasteries in Cuernavaca. The crucifixion fresco on the second level is inspired by various European sources of the 15th and 16th centuries such as German prints, Italian and German ornamental panels. Starkly done in black and white, it reflects the continuing importance of the graphic arts. It also has sun and moon designs, common during the early colonial period, which reflect both old European astrological symbols as well as the importance of these in native art. In the larger, more ornate, cloister, there are medallions with images such as the coat of arms of the Augustine order, a symbol for death, and a symbol representing the union of two worlds. The lower floor has a series of stone etchings with scenes related to the Passion of Christ.

=== Museo Virrenal ===
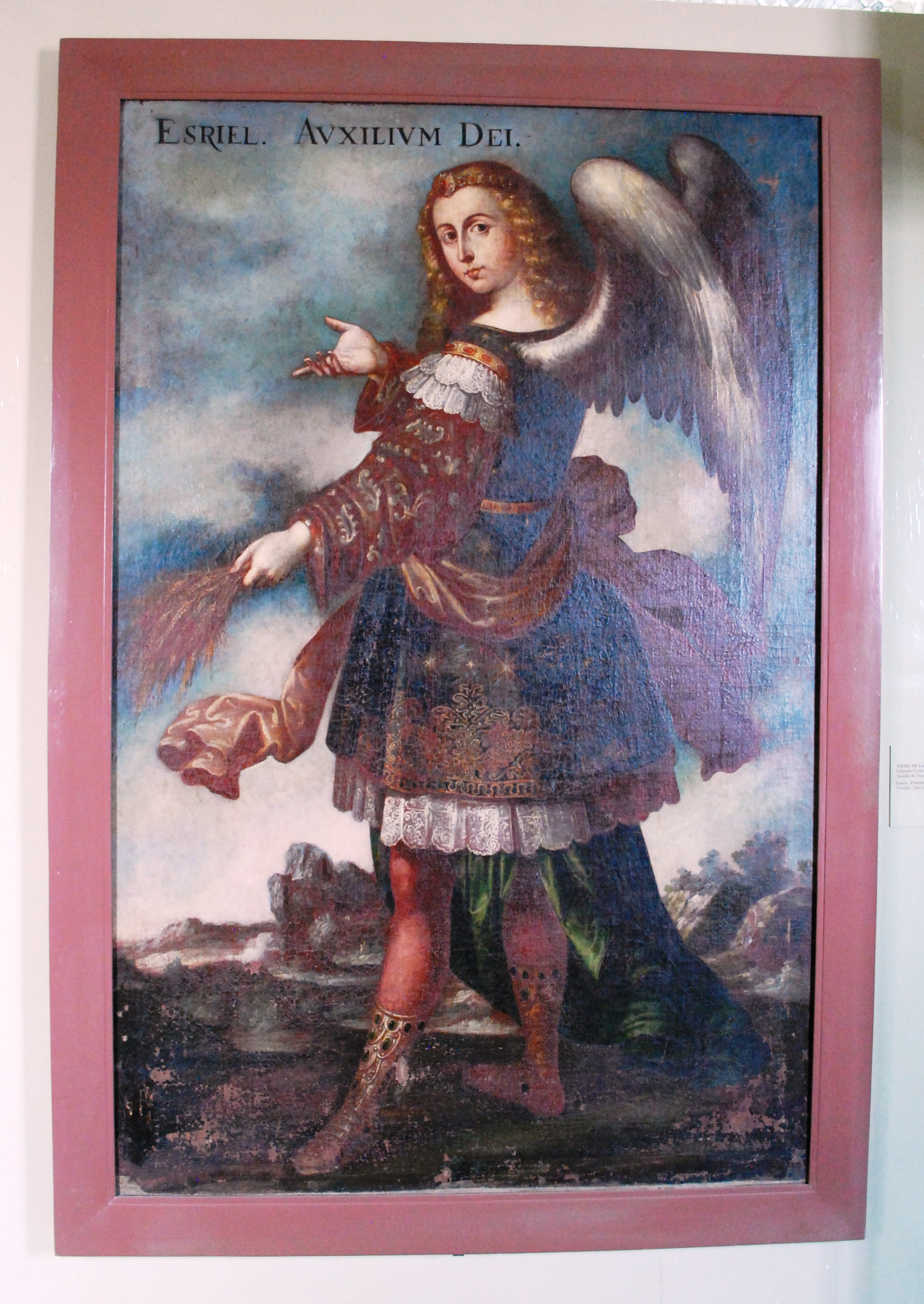
"Angel de la Letania" by unknown author from the 17th century at the Viceregal Museum

Much of the cloister area is occupied by the "Museo Virrenal" (Colonial Era) founded in 1925 in what were the portico, the kitchen the refectory and the hallway to the refectory. It has three main halls which give a detailed explanation of the construction of the site, the lives of the monks and the collection of paintings and religious objects that are on display. The museum contains more than 120 pieces. Many of the religious artwork and objects are in the third hall and include furniture, cloaks, and other religious garb (some embroidered in gold thread), sculptures in stone, wood and corn stalk paste, and oils from the 16th to the 19th centuries.

A website has been created by INAH to allow for the virtual visitation of the museum. The tour is a series of 360 degree panoramic views of each of the rooms and the pre-Hispanic base over which the monastery was built. Some of the restored rooms that are visible this way include the kitchen and the dispensary. The church is also accessible in this manner.(virtual) The site is at http://www.inah.gob.mx y http://culturainah.org/panorama360/acolman/

== The municipality ==
As municipal seat, the town of Acolman is the governing authority for over sixty other named communities,(inegi) which cover a total area of 86.88 km^{2}. At the 2010 census, the total population of the municipality was 136,558, but only about four percent of this population lives in the town proper.(inegi) The municipality borders the municipalities of Tecámac, San Juan Teotihuacán, San Salvador Atenco, Tezoyuca, Chiautla, Tepetlaoxtoc and Ecatepec.

=== Towns and villages ===
The municipal seat, Acolman de Nezahualcóyotl, has a population of 5,571 inhabitants, while the largest city (locality) in the municipality, Tepexpan, has a population of 102,667, more than 18 times as big. This is the largest relative difference between any municipal seat and its largest locality of any municipality in Mexico. The largest localities (cities, towns, and villages) are:

Name	2010 Census Population
Tepexpan	102,667
Acolman de Nezahualcóyotl	5,571
Santa Catarina	5,116
San Bartolo	5,099
San Miguel Xometla	4,571
San Marcos Nepantla	4,116
Prados de San Juan	3,081
San Pedro Tepetitlán	2,805
Total Municipality	136,558

The municipality is located on a plain in the northern portion of the Valley of Mexico called the Valley of Teotihuacan. It has only three significant elevations. The eastern border is marked by the Sierra de Patlachique and the west is marked by a mountain called Chiconautla. Chiconautla and Tlahuilco are forested and are protected areas. From the mountains that surround this plain flow a number of streams such as the San José and the San Antonio, which are commonly called the Rio Grande and the Rio Chico. The municipality lacks fresh water springs, with most potable water coming from deep wells. The climate is temperate and semi-arid with rains in the summer. Temperatures can range from 36 °C in the summer to −4 °C in the winter. Forested areas of the municipality contain trees such as ahuehuete, mesquite, eucalyptus and Peruvian pepper. In the lower, flatter regions, the flora consists of shrubs, grasses, cactus and other plants adapted to dry areas. Wildlife consists mostly of small mammals such as rabbits and skunks, small reptiles such as the chameleon and insects.

The municipality is connected by the, Lechería-Texcoco highway, which starts at the confluence of the Peñón-Texcoco and Los Reyes-Texcoco motorways. The town is also connected to localities such as Teotihuacán and, more distantly, Pachuca (Hidalgo).

== Geography ==
=== Climate ===
Climate data for Acolman de Nezahualcóyotl
Month	Jan	Feb	Mar	Apr	May	Jun	Jul	Aug	Sep	Oct	Nov	Dec	Year
Mean daily maximum °C (°F)	20 (68)	22 (72)	24 (75)	25.7 (78.3)	25.8 (78.4)	24.3 (75.7)	23.4 (74.1)	23.3 (73.9)	22.5 (72.5)	22.0 (71.6)	21.3 (70.3)	20.5 (68.9)	22.9 (73.2)
Mean daily minimum °C (°F)	−0.2 (31.6)	1.3 (34.3)	3.1 (37.6)	5.6 (42.1)	7.1 (44.8)	8.7 (47.7)	8.2 (46.8)	7.7 (45.9)	8.1 (46.6)	5.4 (41.7)	1.8 (35.2)	−0.2 (31.6)	4.7 (40.5)
Average precipitation mm (inches)	2.5 (0.1)	5.1 (0.2)	13 (0.5)	20 (0.8)	38 (1.5)	120 (4.7)	120 (4.6)	99 (3.9)	99 (3.9)	48 (1.9)	13 (0.5)	0 (0)	570 (22.5)
Source: Weatherbase

== Economy ==
Most of the municipality’s territory is dedicated to agriculture. Major crops include barley, corn, sorghum, wheat, maguey, and various vegetables. Orchards also exist there producing capulins, peaches, pears, figs, plums, white sapote, tejocotes and apricots. Livestock includes cattle, pigs, goats and domestic fowl. The second most important economic activity is industry, producing processed foods, drinks, tobacco products and leather goods. Mining is limited to gravel, sand and other construction materials. There are small deposits of gold, silver, copper, quartz and mercury, but they have not been exploited. Most mines are located near the communities of San Pedro Tepetitlan and Xometla. Commerce is mostly limited to serving local needs.

The municipality has a narrow economic base, based on manufacturing and agriculture, with much of the farmland still in ejido status. Acolman is a bedroom community with many of its workers commuting to places such as Mexico City proper and other cities in the State of Mexico. Of those working in the municipality, less than ten percent of the population is employed in agriculture with the rest evenly split between industry and commerce. Population growth has been significantly slower than in other parts of the Mexico City area.

In 2008, Moody's assigned a classification of A3.mx (Mexico scale) and Ba3 (global scale) to the municipality of Acolman. The reasons behind the grades are that while the municipality has a moderate amount of debt and adequate financial development, there have been some management issues in recent years. It also reflects the limited economic base of the area and the need for infrastructure. The municipality needs between 12.5 and 25 million pesos worth of roadwork, which it cannot finance and needs help from the State of Mexico. Unlike other municipalities in the Greater Mexico City area, water supply is based on a system of nineteen water suppliers, with only three owned by the municipality.

== Tourism ==
The main tourist attractions are the archaeological zone of Tepexpan, where the fossilized bones of the Tepexpan man were found, and the former monastery of San Agustin de Acolman. The Tepexpan Museum is located in the community of the same name, famous due to the discovery of the "Tepexpan Man", a human skeleton which is more than 12,000 years old. It was found in 1945 by Dr. Helmut de Terra and Alberto R. Arellano. The museum exhibits mammoth remains as well as flint and obsidian tools. Other attractions in the municipality include the former haciendas of San Antonio, Tepexpan and Nextlalpan. The San Antonio Hacienda is one of the few colonial-era haciendas what has managed to preserve its original architecture. Today it operates as a recreational center. The Castillo Dam was constructed in the 18th century. Other attractions include the "Cueva de los Gatos" cave, and the Cuevas de la Amistad (Friendship Caves) has areas dedicated to medicinal herbs in addition to the caves. The Sierra de Patlachique is an eco-tourism park with facilities for picnicking, swimming, football, cycling and camping.

One important community outside the seat is called Cuanalán, which is a Nahua community. Fewer than 500 people can still speak an indigenous language, but a number of traditions survive. The community of Cuanalán is noted for its musicians, especially those dedicated to wind instruments. The better known groups include Los Vasquez, Los Juárez and Los Chicanos.
