= Chiconcuac de Juárez =

Town and municipality in State of Mexico, Mexico

Chiconcuac (de Juárez)
- Town & Municipality
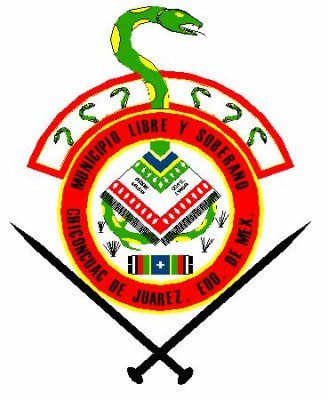
- Seal

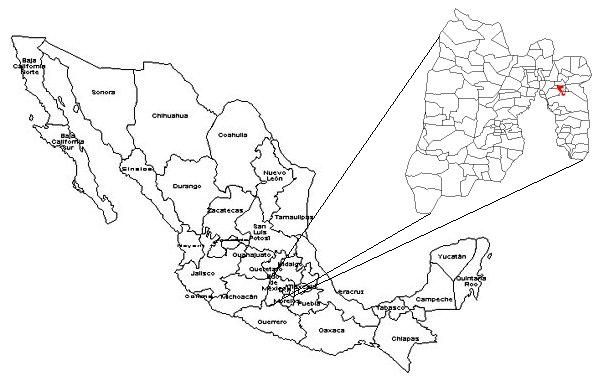
- Coordinates: 19°33′30″N 98°53′33″W
- Country: Mexico
- State: State of Mexico
- Municipal Status: 1868

Government
  - Municipal President: Luciano Castillo Rodríguez (2006-2009)
- Elevation (of seat): 2,250 m (7,380 ft)

Population (2005) Municipality
  - Municipality: 19,656
  - Seat: 19,045
- Time zone: UTC-6 (Central)
- Postal code (of seat): 56270
- Website: http://www.chiconcuac.gob.mx/

Chiconcuac de Juárez, typically referred to simply as Chiconcuac, is a town and municipio (municipality) in the state of Mexico, approximately 10 kilometers north of Texcoco de Mora. The name Chiconcuac derives from the Aztec word Chicome Coatl, “Seven snakes”, which was a date on the Aztec calendar.

== The city ==
Chiconcuac is principally famous for its large tianguis, or public market, which has 2,400 permanent vendors, and attracts up to 6,000 more semi-permanent and itinerant vendors on weekends. The large food court in the Chiconcuac market is widely famous for preparing barbacoa de borrego (lamb barbecue), and other specialties of Mexican cuisine.

=== History ===
The area which is now all one city, was a cluster of settlements of mostly Chichimecas and Tlailotlaques.

The area was conquered by the Spanish in 1597, with land here granted to Hernando Núñez where he established the Hacienda de Santa Cruz de Prado Alegre, better known as the “Arojo”. The area was then evangelized by the Franciscans. Because of its proximity to Mexico City, the city suffered battles during the Mexican War of Independence, the Second French intervention in Mexico and the War of "La Reforma".

In 1980, mammoth bones were discovered in a neighborhood called Calxiacatl.

== The municipality ==
As municipal seat, Chiconcuac de Juárez has jurisdiction over only one other community, which is called Ejido San Cristóbal.

The municipality borders with Atenco, Chiautla and Texcoco.
