= Fausto Saldaña del Moral =

Mexican politician

- Born: 15 July 1967 (age 58); Mexico City, Mexico
- Occupation: Politician
- Political party: PRI

Fausto Sergio Saldaña del Moral (born 15 July 1967) is a Mexican politician from the Institutional Revolutionary Party (PRI). In the 2009 mid-terms he was elected to the Chamber of Deputies to represent the State of Mexico's 14th district during the 61st session of Congress.
