= Silvia Márquez Velasco =

Mexican politician

- Born: 23 August 1961 (age 64); Mexico City, Mexico
- Occupation: Politician
- Political party: PRI

Silvia Márquez Velasco (born 23 August 1961) is a Mexican politician affiliated with the Institutional Revolutionary Party (PRI). In the 2012 general election she was elected to the Chamber of Deputies to represent the State of Mexico's 14th district during the 62nd session of Congress.
