= Carlos Madrazo Limón =

Mexican politician

- Born: 2 February 1952 (age 74); Mexico City, Mexico
- Education: Universidad Iberoamericana; University of London
- Occupation: Politician
- Political party: PAN

Carlos Madrazo Limón (born 2 February 1952) is a Mexican politician affiliated with the National Action Party (PAN).

Madrazo Limón served as municipal president of Atizapán de Zaragoza from 1997 to 2000 and was then elected to the Senate for the 58th and 59th sessions of Congress (2000–2006), representing the State of Mexico.

In the 2006 general election he was elected to the Chamber of Deputies to represent the State of Mexico's 14th district during the 60th session of Congress, and in the 2021 mid-terms he was returned to Congress for the State of Mexico's 15th district during the 65th session.
