= Axapusco =

- Municipality
- Coat of arms

- Location of the municipality in the State of Mexico

- Location in Mexico
- Coordinates: 19°43′10″N 98°47′50″W
- Country: Mexico
- State: Mexico (state)

Government
  - Federal electoral district: State of Mexico's 14th

Area
  - Total: 260.01 km^{2} (100.39 sq mi)

Population (2005)
  - Total: 21,915
- Time zone: UTC-6 (Zona Centro)

Axapusco is a municipality in Mexico's State of Mexico. Its municipal seat is the town of Axapusco and largest town is Jaltepec. The municipality covers an area of 260.01 km^{2}.

As of 2005, the municipality had a total population of 21,915

== Politics ==
Mayor	Time
Florencio Amayo Pérez	2000–2003
Julián Cid González	2003–2006
Felipe Borja Texocotitla	2006–2009
Florencio Amayo Pérez	2009–2012
Gilberto Ramírez Ávila	2013–2015
Felipe Borja Texocotitla	2016–2018
Noé Martínez Juárez	2019–2021
Miriam Coronel Meneses	2022–2024
Melitón Cid Galicia	2025–2027
