= Patricia Flores Fuentes =

Mexican politician

- Born: 25 July 1977 (age 49); State of Mexico, Mexico
- Education: UVM
- Occupation: Politician
- Political party: PAN

Patricia Flores Fuentes (born 25 July 1977) is a Mexican politician affiliated with the National Action Party (PAN). In the 2003 mid-terms she was elected to the Chamber of Deputies to represent the State of Mexico's 14th district during the 59th session of Congress.
