= Teotihuacán Municipality =

Teotihuacán Teotihuacán
- Municipality
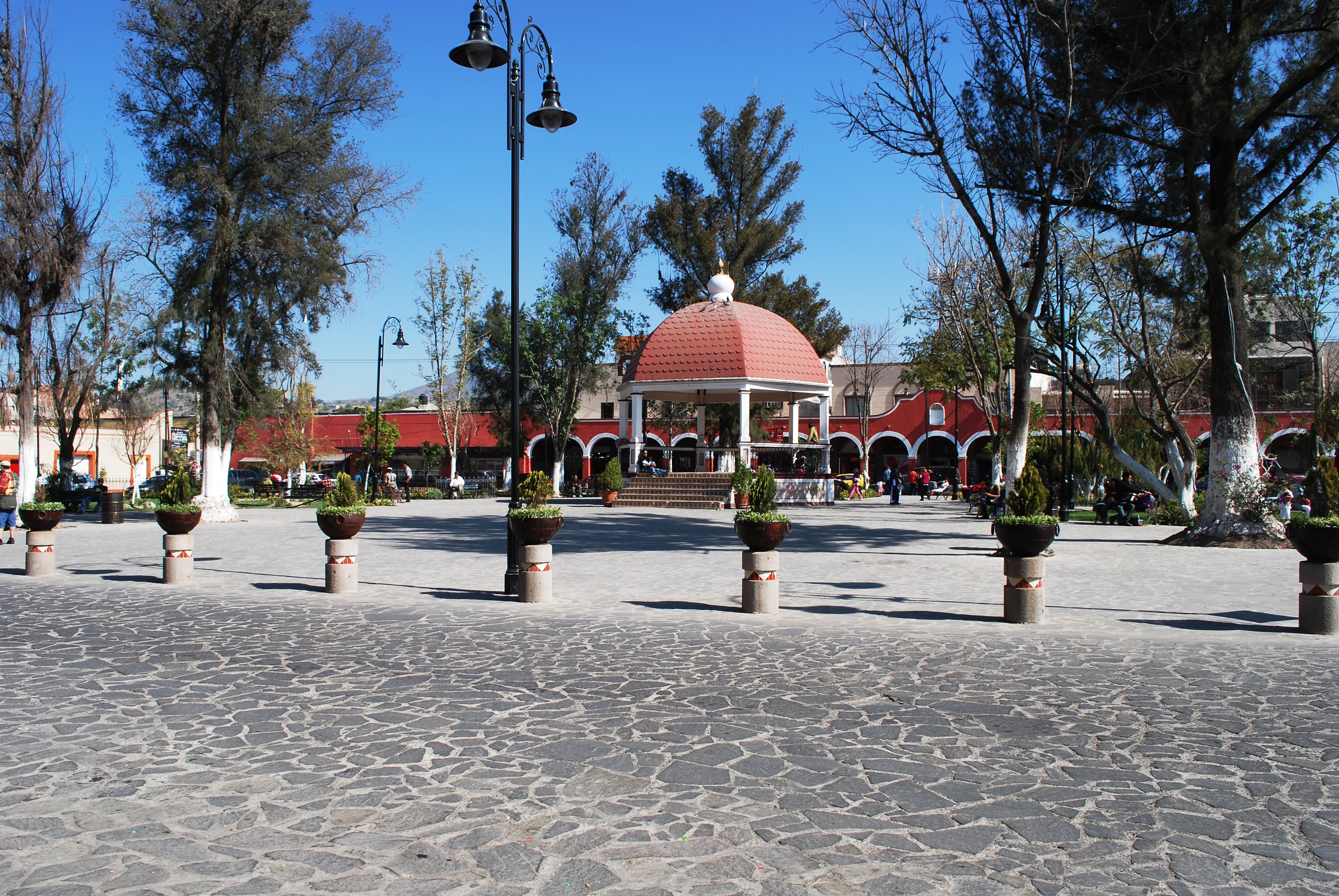
- Main plaza of the town

- Location within State of Mexico Location within Mexico
- Coordinates: 19°41′23″N 98°51′39″W
- Country: Mexico
- State: State of Mexico
- Municipal Seat: Teotihuacán de Arista
- Founded: 500 B.C.E.
- Municipality Founded: 1882

Government
  - Municipal President: Álvaro Sánchez Mendoza
- Elevation (of seat): 2,270 m (7,450 ft)

Population (2005) Municipality
  - Municipality: 46,779
  - Seat: 21,577
- Time zone: UTC-6 (Central)
- Postal code (of seat): 55880
- Website: www.teotihuacan.gob.mx (in Spanish)

Teotihuacán is a municipality located in the State of Mexico. The municipal seat is the town of Teotihuacán de Arista. It is in the northeast of the Valley of Mexico, 45 km northeast of Mexico City and 119 km from the state capital of Toluca. Teotihuacan takes its name from the ancient city and World Heritage Site that is located next to the municipal seat. "Teotihuacan" is from Nahuatl and means "place of the gods." In Nahua mythology the Sun and the Moon were created here. The seal of the municipality features the Pyramid of the Sun from the archeological site, which represents the four cardinal directions. The building is tied to a character that represents water which is linked to an arm that is joined to the head of an indigenous person who is seated and speaking. This person represents a god. Much of the history of the area has been tied to the ancient city, most recently involves controversy connected with commerce and development around the site.

== History ==
According to myth, this site was chosen by the gods to create the center of the universe. Settlement began here around 500 BCE as a village making stone objects. Starting in the 2nd century CE, it grew into a political and religious center which lasted until the 9th century. This was the largest urban center to be constructed in central Mexico until Tenochtitlan further south in the 15th century. All that is left of this city is the archeological site, which preserves structures such as the Pyramids of the Sun and Moon, the Temple of Quetzalcoatl, the market and numerous smaller structures, most of which were government buildings.

At the time of the Spanish conquest, the Teotihuacan area was venerated by the Aztecs, but this status died off with the coming of Christianity. The area came under the control of Texcoco. The area was renamed San Juan Teotihuacan and was the encomienda of Francisco de Verdugo Bazan by the end of the 16th century. According to the 1580 Relación geográfica, the primary language in San Juan Teotihuacan was Nahuatl, but minorities spoke Otomi and Popoloca. During the Mexican War of Independence no battles were fought here although both insurgent and royalist armies passed through at one time or another. The municipality was taxed heavily to feed Mexico City during this time, leading to the abandonment of many fields.

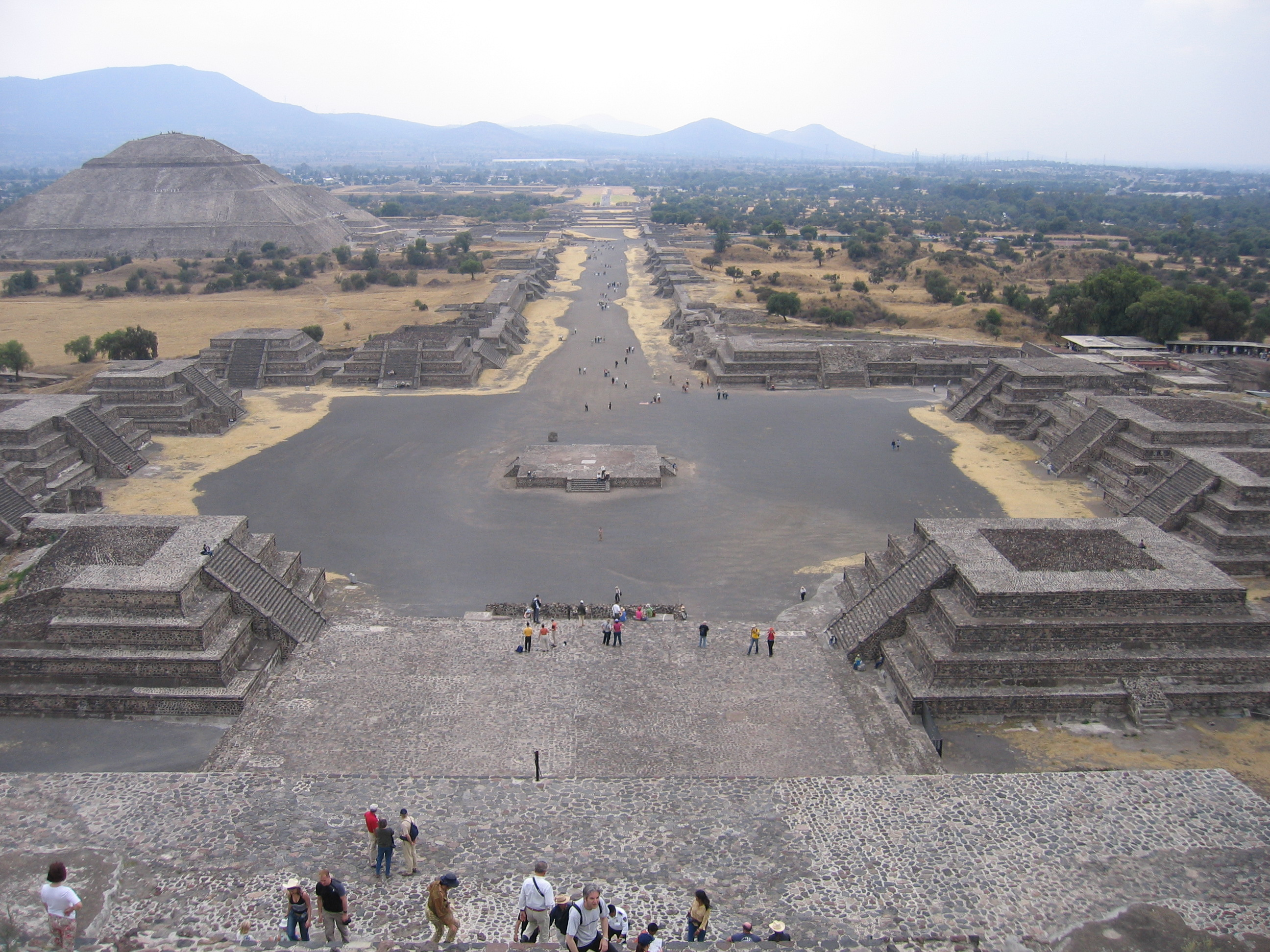
View of the Avenue of the Dead and from the Pyramid of the Moon. The modern town is on the horizon

The Mexican Revolution in the early 20th century had profound effects on the municipality as well as many other rural areas in Mexico. The various factions loyal to insurgents such as Emiliano Zapata, Venustiano Carranza and Álvaro Obregón came and went producing anarchy and scarcity of food. By the end of the war, there was widespread hunger in the municipality, with fields in ruins.

Since then, much of the municipality's history has been tied to the archeological site. Archeological explorations started at the site by Leopoldo Batres as early as 1905. The Pyramid of the Sun was the first to be explored and restored, followed by a number of other religious structures. In 1962, the Instituto Nacional de Antropología e Historia (INAH) began work at the site under Ignacio Bernal, which was completed in 1964. This project explored and restored the Palace complex Quetza-Mariposa, the Calle de los Muertos, the Pyramid of the Moon and finished work on the Pyramid of the Sun. A highway from Mexico City was also built. The site was opened to the public by President Adolfo López Mateos.

The site has been a source of revenue for the municipality as well as a source of controversy. INAH has classified much of the area into three sectors: A, B, and C. A includes the Calzada de los Muertos (Avenue of the Dead), pyramids and other structures within what is commonly thought of as the site. Sectors B and C are two peripheral rings around sector A. Each of these sectors have building and other land use restrictions, which depend on how far the center any given site is. These restrictions have come into conflict with development concerns.

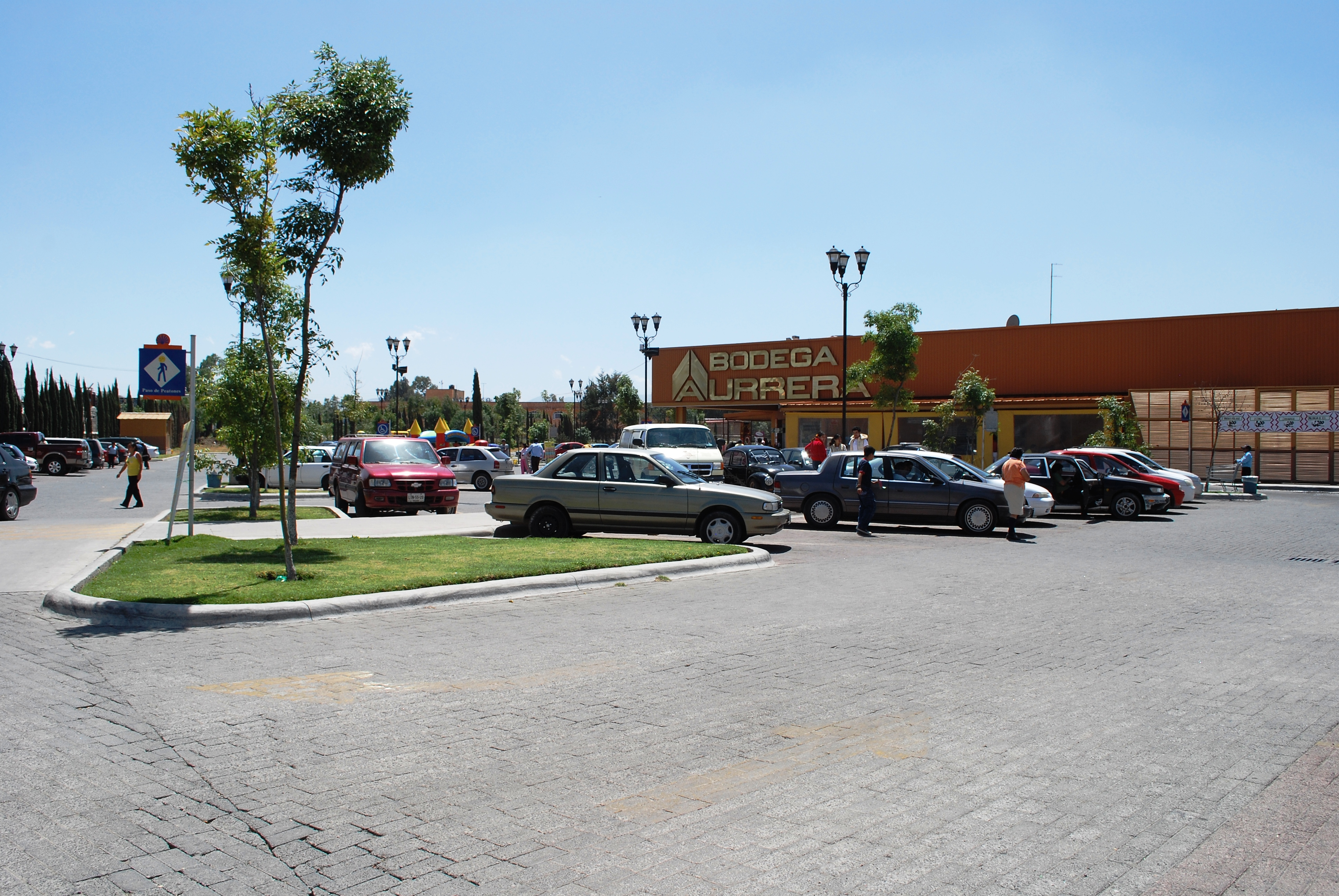
The Bodega Aurrerá of Teotihuacan

The largest of these controversies occurred in the mid 2000s when Bodega Aurrerá, a subsidiary of Wal-Mart of Mexico, gained permissions to build a supermarket in the Purificación neighborhood, which is within Sector C. Municipal authorities and INAH granted permits for the projects with some restrictions. However, activists, including some high-profile names such as José Luis Cuevas, Francisco Toledo, Elena Poniatowska and Homero Aridjis, opposed the store's presence on cultural and economic grounds. However, the store was built and has been operating since 2005.

In 2008, the diocese of San Juan Teotihuacan was authorized by the Vatican. The first bishop, Guillermo Francisco Escobar Galicia, is a native of the Teotihuacan area.

In December 2009, about 300 members of the Sindicato Mexicano de Electricistas (SME), the nation's electricians' union, sabotaged a substation at km 110 of the Teotihuacan-Tulancingo highway, blacking out power to about 45,000 people in various municipalities. SME and the federal government have been at odds over the privatization of electricity in the country. In 2015, Teotihuacán was integrated to the "Pueblos Mágicos" program.

== The town ==
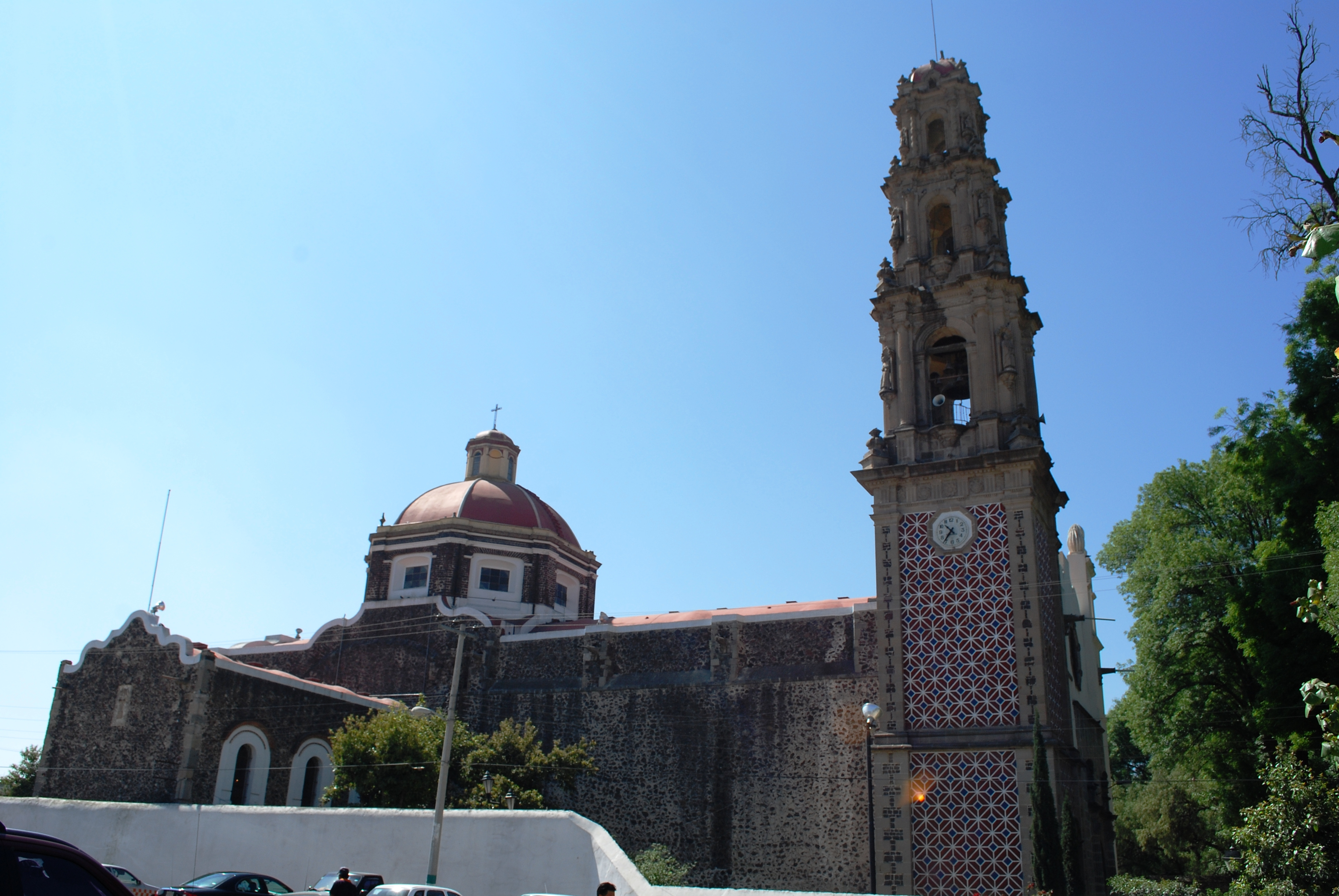
Church and former monastery of San Juan Evangelista

The town has been named a Pueblo con Encanto (Town with Charm) by the government of the State of Mexico, as well as a Pueblo con Encanto del Bicentenario (of the Bicentennial). It was chosen as representative of the history of the State of Mexico due to the archeological site and the historic buildings that are in the town proper.

The origin of the modern town is marked by the former monastery of San Juan Evangelista, which was founded in 1548. The main entrance from the atrium contains decorated arches. The portal is of quarried stone which has been sculpted with ornamentation. The rest of the facade contains niches with statues of saints as well as Solomonic columns. The church bell tower includes an old bell gable topped by merlons is the form of cactus typical of the region. To the right of the main church is the open chapel which is fronted by six arches supported by Doric columns and contains a baptismal font. Inside the church is a finally sculpted wooden pulpit. Much of the old cloister area remains as well.

Monday is market day and the town hosts one of the most traditional "tianguis" in the Valley of Mexico, where hundreds of stalls are set up between the archeological site and the old monastery. Most of the merchandise is foodstuffs and prepared dishes. The tianguis is known for its fruits and vegetables, as well as a number of craft items. Here and at the permanent municipal market, one can try local dishes such as barbacoa, mixiote, quail and many preparations with nopal, which grows abundantly. The municipal market dates from the early 20th century. In 2005, when the market decided to install a new drainage system, INAH was called into do archeological work, as it is within the site's perimeter and no archeological surveys had been undertaken here before. The exploration discovered the vestiges of a home altar dating from about 450 CE and three graves with the remains of six individuals. The altar is 25 cm tall with the remains of posts which probably held up a roof. The graves contained the remains of four infants, one youth and one adult, which archeologist think are related.

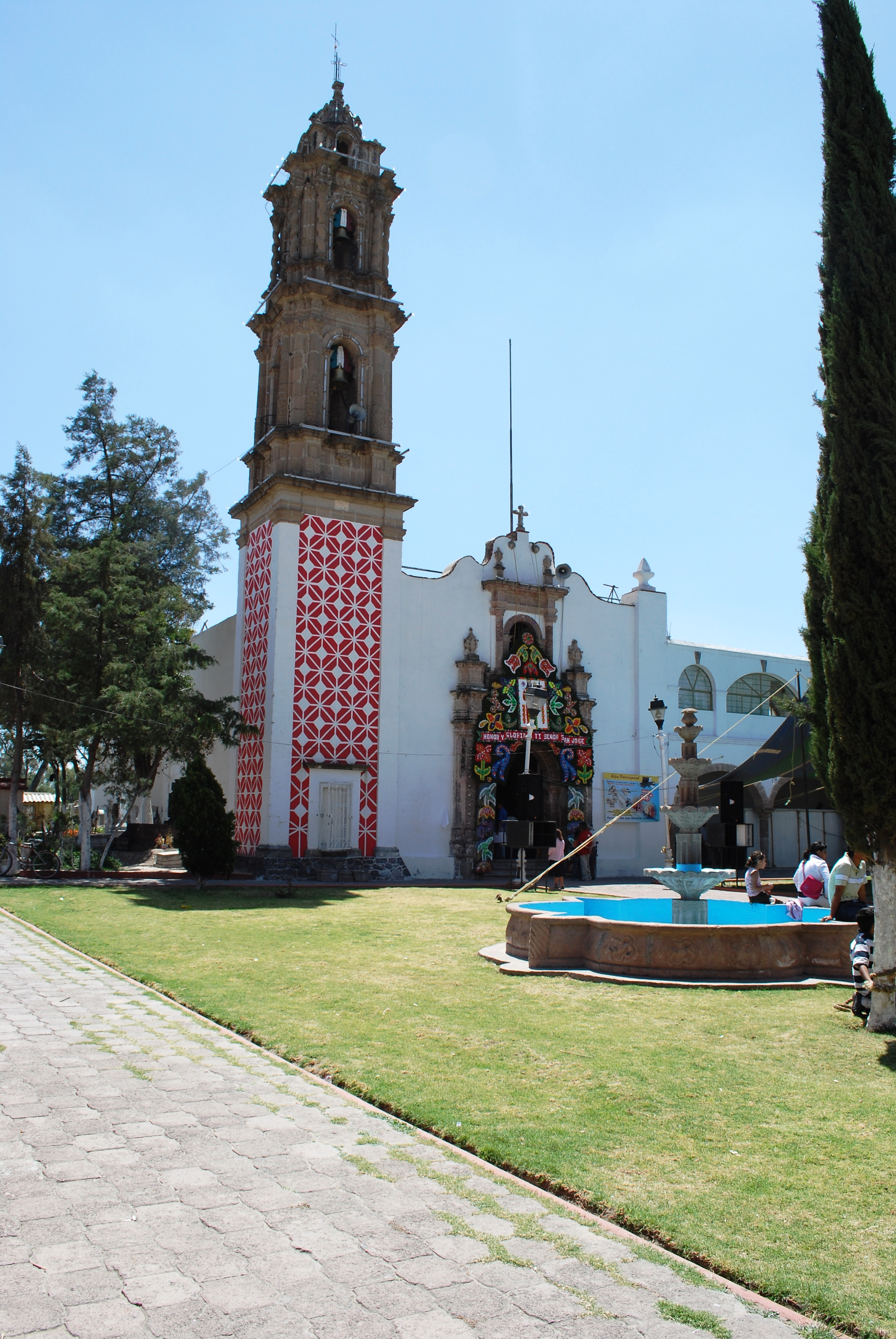
The Temple of Nuestra Señora de la Purificacíon

In the La Concepción neighborhood, there is the Temple of Nuestra Señora de la Purificacíon. The main entrance was made with quarried stone in Baroque style. The facade is divided into three bodies: the first stands out due to portal arch highly decorated with flowers in relief. The second body contains the choir window flanked by columns which are also sculpted with vegetable motifs. The tower contains Solomonic columns and columns with Corinthian capitals. The cornices has vegetative decoration.

The Jardin de las Cactáceas or Cactus Garden covers four hectares and exhibits a wide variety of plants found in the deserts and arid grasslands of Mexico. Some of the plants include maguey, various palms, barrel cactus and other cacti. It is located next to the archeological site.

The town has two main traditional festivals: the feast day of John the Baptist (the patron of the town) in late June and the feast of Christ the Redeemer in July, which runs concurrently with the Obsidian Fair. During the festival of Christ the Redeemer, which lasts eight days, one can see a number of traditional dances such as the Aztecs, Santiagueros and Sembradores. There are also amusement rides, fireworks and sporting events.

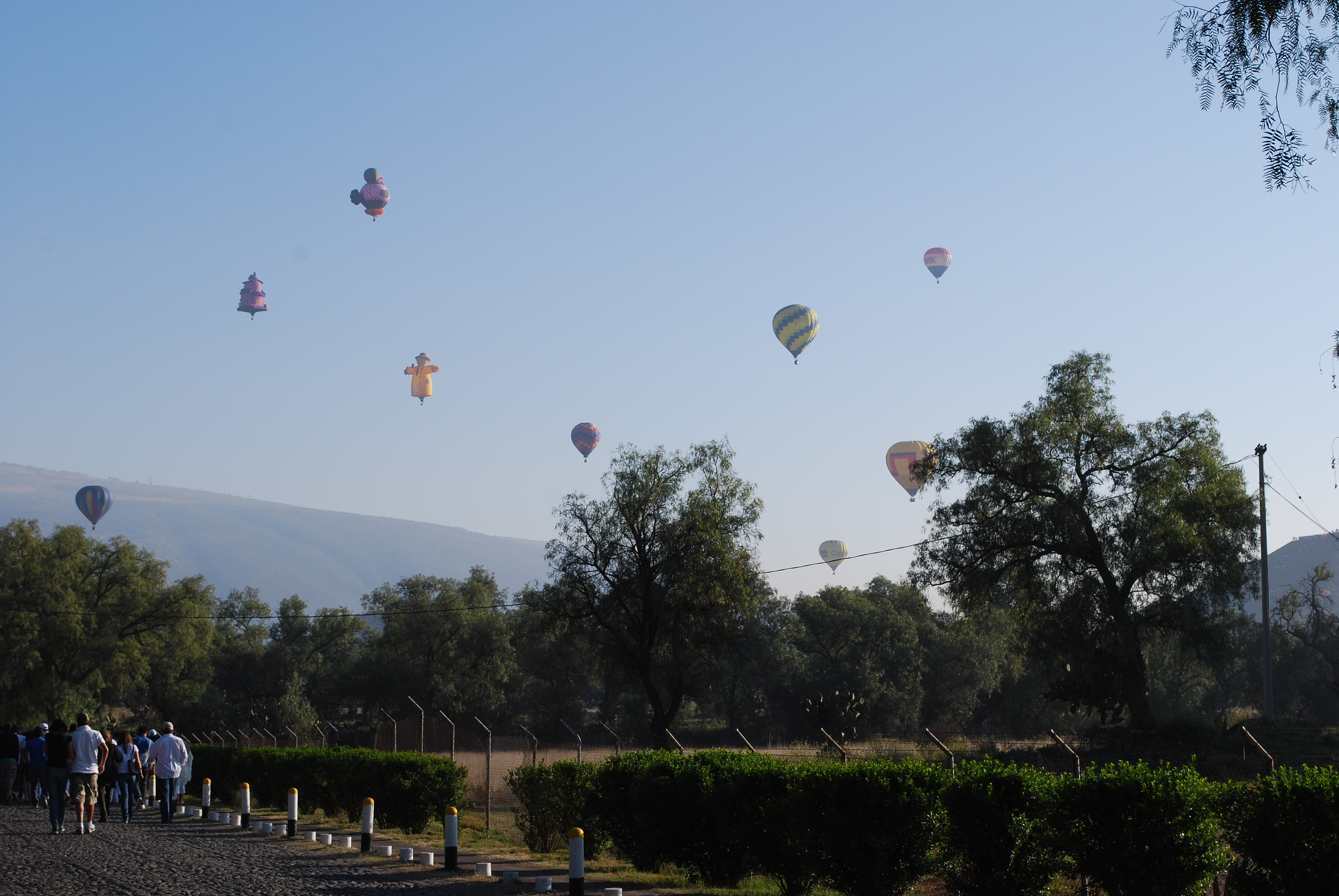
Balloons over the Teotihuacan site during the Festival Aerostatico Teotihuacan

In the 2000s, two other annual events have been added the Festival Aerostatico Teotihuacan and the Festival Musica para los Dioses. The Festival Aerostatico Teotihuacan (Teotihuacan Hot-Air Balloon Festival) has been held each year since 2005. The event attracts about 15,000 people each year with an average of twenty balloons participating. Other events include paragliding and skydiving exhibitions, ultragliders, a farming and livestock show, and a gastronomy and crafts fair. The 2010 event was dedicated to the Bicentennial of Mexico's Independence and featured a dirigible 44 meters long and the return of John Ninomiya, a man who is able to fly attached to a bunch of balloons. The event takes place at the Globopuerto Volare, located on the Tulancingo-Teotihuacan highway. The Festival Musica para los Dioses (Music for the Gods Festival) is an annual rock and roll event. The festival has attracted as many as fifty bands and crowds of more than 20,000. Attendees bring or rents camping gear, including tents in a secure location as a recreation of Woodstock to stay for the 35-hour event. The annual festival has been going on since 2006 and has featured acts such as the Babasónicos, Maldita Vecindad, Instituto Mexicano del Sonido and Panteón Rococó. The Festival Musica para los Dioses is considered to be the most important rock and camping fest in all of Mexico.

== The archeological site ==
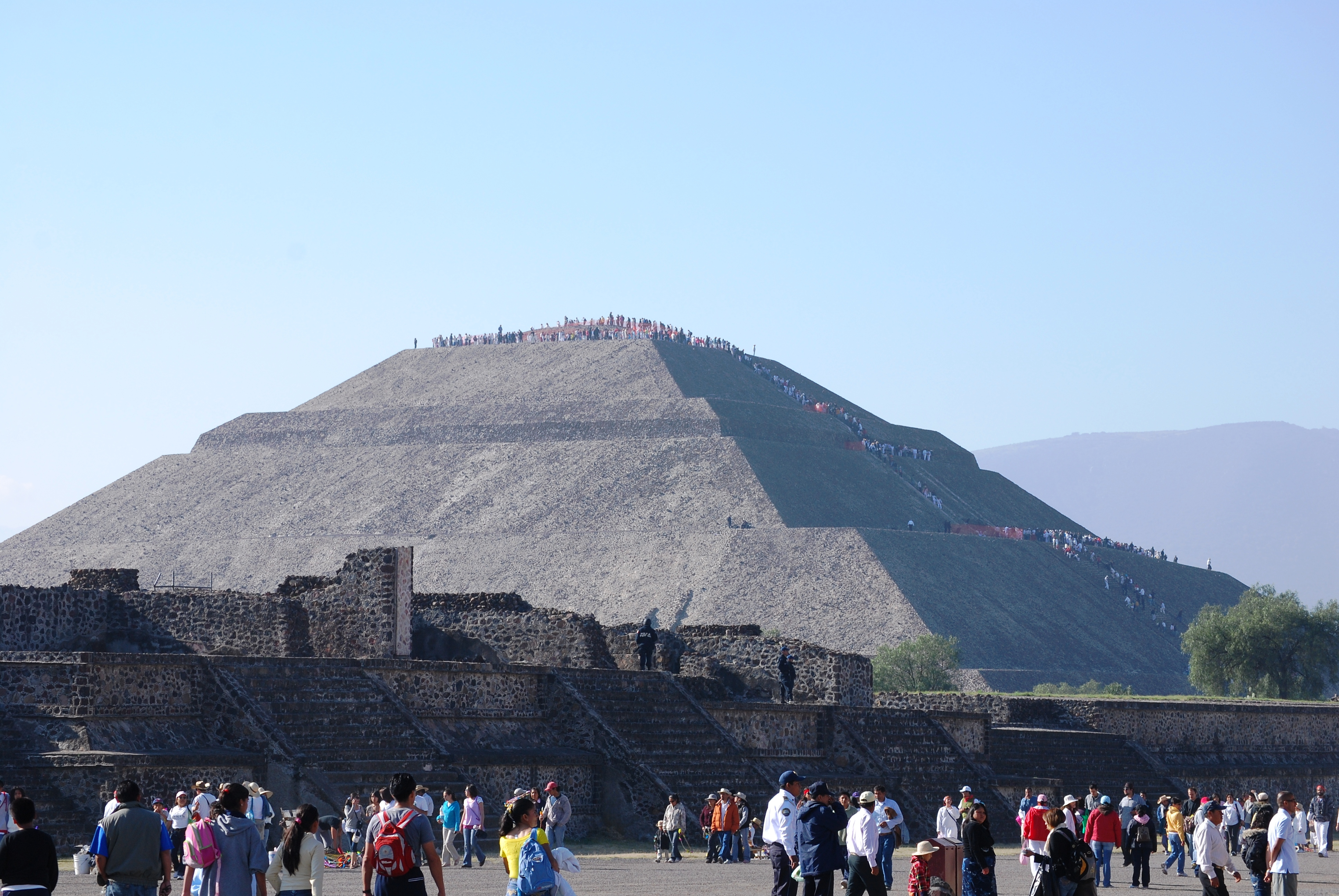
People ascending the Pyramid of the Sun during spring equinox

The main attraction here is the Teotihuacan archeological site, which is a World Heritage Site. The center of the site is the Calzada de los Muertos or the Avenue of the Dead, which is almost four kilometres long. The city surrounds this avenue in mostly symmetrical form, which can best be seen at the Pyramid of the Moon at the north end or the Temple of Quetzalcoatl at the south end. Most visitors head for the Pyramid of the Sun and then the Pyramid of the Moon. The Pyramid of the Sun is the second largest in Mexico, with only the pyramid at Cholula being larger. It measures 64 meters tall, and consists of five bodies with stairs. Visitors are no longer allowed to climb to the top of the pyramid, which is reputed to have energizing qualities, especially during the spring equinox. The Pyramid of the Moon is located at the north end of the Calzada de los Muertos. It has four bodies with stairs. There are a number of other palaces and structures worth visiting such as The Citadel, the Palace of Quetzalpapalotl, the Temple of the Plumed Snails and the Palace of the Jaguars. Recently a mural museum has been constructed at the site which contains 34 of the site's murals along with selected artifacts.

Despite the size and importance of the site, the ruins have not spurred the development of a major tourism industry here. Only four hotels exist near the site and most who earn a living from tourism do so by selling souvenirs both inside and outside the site's gates. General commerce and tourism together only employ about 32 percent of the population. However, businesses catering to tourists has developed haphazardly. The entrance is crowded with beer billboards, hotels, restaurants and dozens of stands selling souvenirs and up to hundreds of wandering vendors both inside and outside the archeological site. Within zones A and B of the site are 500+ wandering vendors, 240 souvenir shops, 32 restaurants, 10 billboards, a radio antenna, a hotel and a spa/water park. Most of these have been constructed since the 1980s on what used to be farmland. This farmland was one of the arguments the federal government used to convince UNESCO to make Teotihuacan a World Heritage Site. INAH acknowledges that the stands and vendors are an eyesore but it is not something the agency can resolve on its own. The agency states that it is working with state and other federal authorities to move the commerce into permanents buildings. However, most of the vendors have been very resistant to any change.

Also controversial has been the development of major commerce centers near the site. A large commercial plaza was built in an area located in Sector B in the 1990s. In 2001, after many court battles, the land the plaza was on was expropriated, and the buildings were demolished in 2003. In 2004 and 2005, the proposal to build a Bodega Aurrera supermarket, a subsidiary of Wal-Mart of Mexico, generated even more controversy, even though the site is located farther away in Sector C, where construction of this type is permitted The supermarket was built in the Purificación neighborhood, 3 km from the Pyramid of the Moon and 2.4 km from the Pyramid of the Sun. Many saw the symbolism of a Wal-Mart so close to the archeological site threatening. Opponents have included conservationists, indigenous groups, intellectuals, artists and ecologists, including Luis Cuevas, Francisco Toledo, Elena Poniatowska and Homero Aridjis. During the controversy, rumors of murder and open talk of corruption circulated widely, with some comparing the construction to the Spanish conquest The construction proposal divided the local community, with those supporting the store pointing to the jobs it would create. Local opponents were also worried about the superstore's effects on smaller businesses. Despite being confronted with evidence of "irregularities" authorized by Wal-Mart de Mexico, Wal-Mart's executives in Bentonville, Ark. shut down their investigation of the Teotihuacán controversy in 2006.

Permission to build was granted by INAH with stipulations as to the size of the building and architectural elements, so that it would not affect the "cultural and natural landscape." INAH also require excavation of the site prior to building. Prior to the construction of the store, excavations were undertaken at the site. Two altars were found measuring eight cm and twenty five cm, both of which are preserved in the parking lot. UNESCO experts determined that the construction posed no threat to the site.

In 2012 a New York Times Pulitzer Prize-winning investigation on the ethics and legality of the Teotihuacán Wal-Mart development revealed that Wal-Mart de Mexico had been involved in distributing nearly $300,000 in bribes to local officials, resulting in the secret alteration of a 2003 zoning map to allow for Wal-Mart to be built inside the buffer zone surrounding the pyramids. Amidst rising allegations of corruption, the superstore was rapidly completed in time for Christmas 2004 before publicly announced plans to find an alternate site were realized.

Activists who opposed the store's opening still oppose its presence, sending letters to the president of Mexico demanding its closure, claiming that Wal-mart has reneged on promises. INAH supports some of these claims saying that the store has violated several laws with its opening, but blames both the municipality and the State of Mexico for allowing the violations to stand.

Opening in November 2004, the store is located 2.4 km (1.5 mi) from the Pyramid of the Sun and cannot be seen from the top of the structure. Since its opening, the supermarket has been a success, becoming an economic engine for the town since it attracts thousands of shoppers from the surrounding area each week. The store also received over 2,000 applications for 185 permanent jobs before opening. However, its location at the town's entrance has exacerbated existing traffic congestion.

In 2009, controversy erupted between the INAH and the State of Mexico over plans to light the pyramids at night. INAH is opposed because their archeologists feel the installation of the equipment will damage the structures.

== The municipality ==
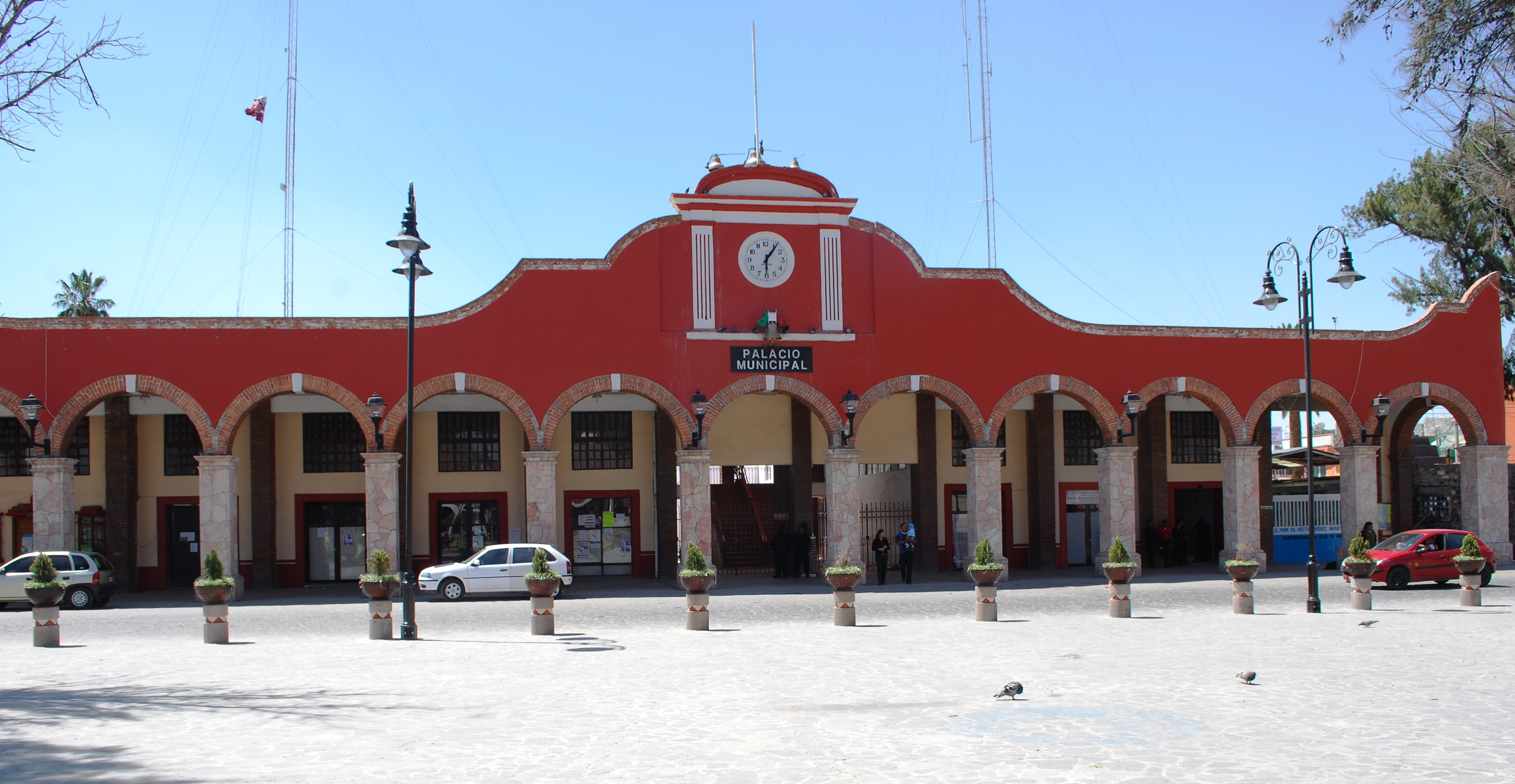
The municipal palace

As municipal seat, the town of San Juan Teotihuacán is the local governing authority for about 115 other named communities with a combined territory of 82.65 km^{2} (31.91 sq mi). A little under half the municipality's population lives in the town proper. The municipality borders the municipalities of Temascalapa, Acolman, Otumba de Gómez Farías, San Martín de las Pirámides and Tecámac.

Most of the territory is flat, except for some large hills such as the Maninal and the Colorado. The most important rivers here are the San Juan and the San Lorenzo, both of which pass through the municipal seat. Another river is the San Sebastián Xolalpa, also known as the Barranquillas del Aguila. There are also a number of fresh water springs which provide drinking and irrigation water. The Parroquia spring is the source of the San Juan River. Channeling water from some of these sources is the San Agustín Actipan aqueduct. The climate is temperate and semi-arid with rains in the summer. Average year round temperature is 15.4 C with highs reaching up to the low 30sC. There can be frosts from October to March. Some areas of the municipality have small forests of cedar, pine, fir and other trees. In other area, dry climate vegetation such as cactus, maguey, grasses and other plants are prominent. Wildlife includes skunks, rabbits, moles, buzzards, hummingbirds, quail, rattlesnakes, frogs as well as a large number of other birds, reptiles and insects.

Most of the municipality's land is dedicated to agriculture, with forests coming second at around fourteen percent. Most agriculture is seasonal and tied to the annual rainy season. Main crops include alfalfa, oats, barley, beans, corn, wheat and prickly pears. There are orchards that produce pears, apples, tejocotes, peaches, apricots, plums and other fruits. Most livestock consists of pigs or domestic fowl kept on family plots. Most of the forest areas are not economically valuable. Agriculture employs the majority (48%) of the municipality's population. Most crafts produced here are imitation pre-Hispanic pieces to sell to tourists.

There is some industry here mostly the processing of agricultural products such as food, drinks, tobacco, wood and paper. There is some industry related to petroleum, other chemicals and metals. This sector employs about 20 percent of the population.

Outside the town and Teotihuacan site there are some other tourist attractions. Reino Animal (Animal Kingdom) is a safari park located on the road to Tulancingo. Here the animals wander freely while visitors are confined to vehicles. There are also two spas/water parks called Cuauhtemoc and La Fuente. These parks contain swimming pools, slides, green areas and more.
