= Papalotla =

- Municipality
- Coat of arms

- Location within State of Mexico
- Coordinates: 19°33′44″N 98°51′28″W
- Country: Mexico
- State: State of Mexico
- Municipal seat: Papalotla

Government
  - Mayor: Luis Enrique Islas Rincon

Area
  - Total: 3.59 km^{2} (1.39 sq mi)

Population (2005)
  - Total: 3,766
- Time zone: UTC-6 (Central Standard Time)

Papalotla is a municipality in the State of Mexico in Mexico. The municipality covers an area of 3.59 km^{2} (1 sq mi).

In 2005, the municipality had a total population of 3766.
