= Tezoyuca =

- Municipality
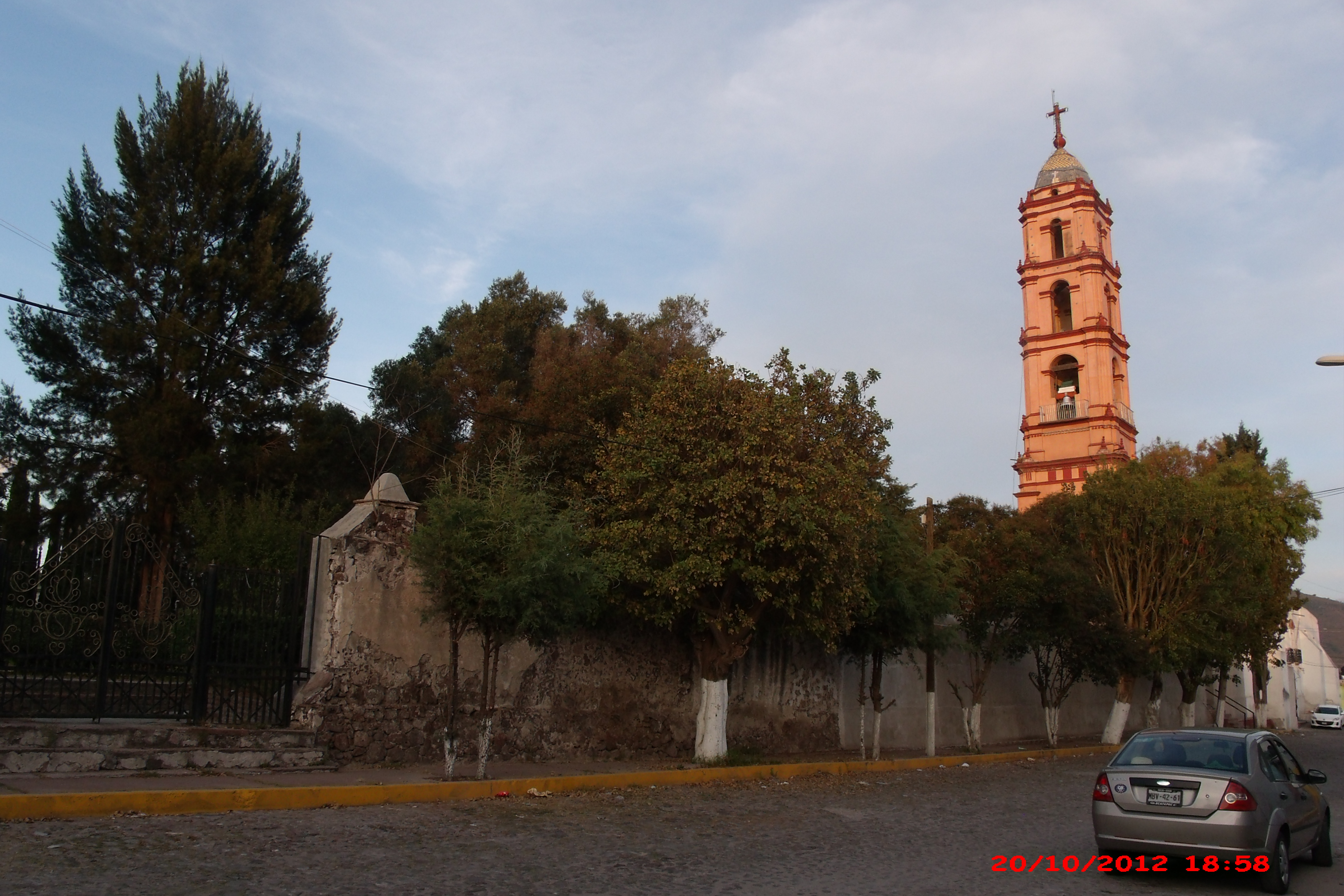

- Coat of arms

- Location in Mexico
- Coordinates: 19°45′11″N 99°11′15″W
- Country: Mexico
- State: State of Mexico
- Municipal Seat: Tezoyuca

Area
  - Total: 10.9 km^{2} (4.2 sq mi)

Population (2005)
  - Total: 25,372
- Time zone: UTC-6 (Central Standard Time)

Tezoyuca is a municipality in the State of Mexico in Mexico. The municipality covers an area of 10.9 km^{2}.

As of 2005, the municipality had a total population of 25,372.
