= San Martín de las Pirámides =

- Municipality
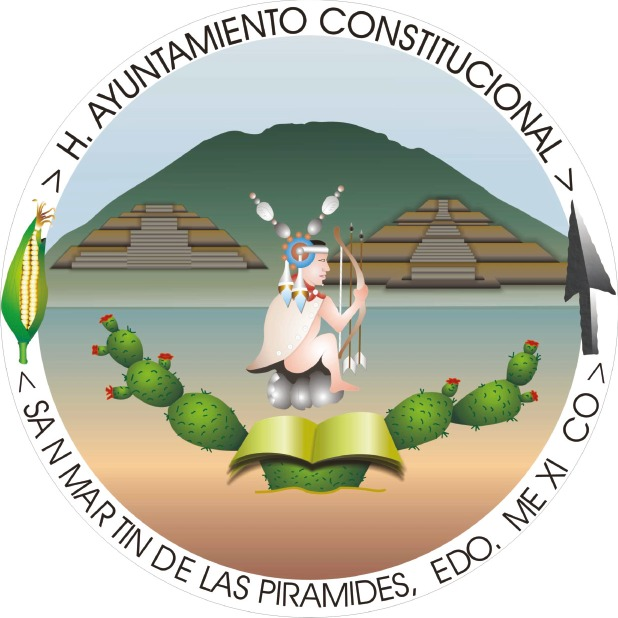
- Coat of arms

- Location in Mexico
- Coordinates: 19°44′N 98°49′W
- Country: Mexico
- State: Mexico
- Municipal Seat: San Martín de las Pirámides

Area
  - Total: 70 km^{2} (27 sq mi)

Population (2005)
  - Total: 21,511
- Time zone: UTC-6 (Central Standard Time)

San Martín de las Pirámides is a municipality in the State of Mexico in Mexico. The municipality covers an area of 70 km^{2}.

As of 2005, the municipality had a total population of 21,511.
