= Chiautla, State of Mexico =

Chiautla
- Town and municipality
- Coat of arms
- Interactive map of Chiautla
- Location within State of Mexico Location within Mexico
- Coordinates: 19°34′00″N 98°52′48″W
- Country: Mexico
- State: State of Mexico
- Founded: 12th century AD

Government
  - Federal electoral district: State of Mexico's 14th

Population (2020 census)
  - Total: 30,045
- Time zone: UTC-6 (Zona Centro)
- Website: chiautlaedomex.gob.mx

Chiautla is a settlement in the State of Mexico in Mexico. It serves as the municipal seat for the surrounding small municipality of the same name. It is located in the north-east of the state.

In the 2020 census, the municipality reported a population of 30,045, up 14.7% from the 2010 figure. The sources disagree on its surface area, with figures of between 20.13km^{2} and 30.32km^{2} being given.

The settlement was founded by Toltec–Chichimeca settlers in the 12th century AD.
