= 2006 civil unrest in San Salvador Atenco =

The 2006 civil unrest in San Salvador Atenco began on Wednesday, May 3, when police prevented a group of 60 flower vendors from selling at the Texcoco local market in the State of México, about 30 km (19 mi) from Mexico City. State police used violence against the vendors and arrested those who resisted. The flower vendors appealed to the residents of San Salvador Atenco, a small neighboring community about 25 km (16 mi) northeast of Mexico City, famous for creating their resistance organization against the development of an airport on their land in 2002 ( an organization called the "FPDT", and known to be allied with the Zapatista Army of National Liberation).

The Atenco residents then blocked the highway to Texcoco near their town. In response, hundreds of state police were summoned to remove the blockade, but were unsuccessful after five attempts.

The confrontations were violent, causing Enrique Peña Nieto, then Governor of the State of Mexico, to ask president Vicente Fox for support from federal forces. The resulting chaos lead to the death of two protesters, and the sexual assault of dozens of people (mostly women) by the police forces.

== FPDT: "Frente de Pueblos en Defensa de la Tierra" ==
The F.P.D.T stands for "Frente de Pueblos en Defensa de la Tierra,” or “People’s Front in the Defense of the Land.” The F.P.D.T started as a group of residents of the rural community San Salvador Atenco that were in public opposition to the construction of the new airport on their land. They began to hold protests and demonstrations expressing their sentiments towards the government's plans for the airport in their town. As their protests continued, they began to gain support nationally and eventually internationally. As they continued to gain strength and support, the government wanted to displace to make way for the airport, thus the civil unrest of 2006 broke out. After the attacks of 2006, the F.P.D.T shifted their focus as a group. They began to do more work focused around receiving justice for the victims of the attacks. They continue to hold protests and demonstrations in opposition to the violent behaviors of the government that occurred against the protestors in 2006. The group is still active today, as they focus on continuing to shine a light on the brutality that occurred against their people. For example, each year on May 3 they hold demonstrations remembering those who were affected by the violence. They also continue to remain relevant today through social media platforms, where they post information and resources about their cause and continue to support those who have been affected by police brutality.

== Timeline of Events ==
=== 2001 ===
On October 22, President Vicente Fox announces in Diario Oficial de la Federación plans to move the International Airport of Mexico City project to Texcoco. The construction of the airport would displace local indigenous groups in Texcoco of more than 13.3 thousand acres of land that belonged to 13 ejidos, communally owned farm land. The Commission of Appraisal of National Assets (Cabin) valued the land at 7.20 pesos and the irrigation at 25 pesos per square meter.

=== 2002 ===
The displacement of these local indigenous groups and low payout sparked outrage. As a result, locals organized to create the Community Front in Defense of Land (Frente del pueblo en defensa de la tierra or FPDT in Spanish). The FPDT organized a protest of over 500 locals to halt the construction of the airport and return their ancestral land.

On July 11 the FPDT and locals faced repression by state forces. They were blocked from being able to enter Teotihuacan where they were looking to protest then governor of the State of Mexico Arturo Montiel.

On July 25, as a result of the state repression and violence, Jose Enrique Espinoza died.

On August 6, due to the death of Jose Enrique Espinoza after the violent July repression, President Fox announced the cancellation of the project and returned the expropriated land to the people of Texcoco.

=== 2006 ===
On April 12, the FPDT, who had in 2005 vowed to unite in solidarity with other local resistance movements, joined La Otra Campaña to confront the blockade to the Belisario Domínguez market two days prior by state forces. The blockade forced local farmers trying to sell their produce to turn back.

On May 3, in retaliation to the confrontation in April, municipal and state troops blocked local flower vendors from selling their flowers. The vendors resisted and violence ensued.

The flower vendors turned to the FPDT to aid in their resistance. The FPDT then organized a blockade of the important road Lecheria-Texcoco. Ex-president Enrique Peña Nieto, who was then governor of the State of Mexico, sends highly armed state forces to stop the blockade. A violent confrontation followed resulting in the assassination of a 14-year old boy.

The violent confrontation between protestors and state forces last days resulting in 2 people murdered, 26 women raped, 50 people heavily injured, 200 people illegally detained. A report on human rights violations also investigated numerous more cases or sexual harassment, torture, and rape of people who were imprisoned as a result of the protest.

On May 10, a march was organized in solidarity with the protestors of Atenco and Texcoco who were victims of state violence and detained.

=== 2014 ===
On September 2, after becoming president in 2012, Enrique Peña Nieto, who was the governor of the State of Mexico that sent in the state forces to San Salvador Atenco in May 2006, announced once again the construction of the international airport on the Texcoco lake. In late 2018, at the end of Peña Nieto's presidential term, the plans to build the airport were canceled once again following a referendum that declared the airport should be built in a different location.

== National Human Rights Commission report ==
On 16 October 2006, National Human Rights Commission (CNDH) President José Luis Soberanes Fernández published the results of its five-month investigation of the case. The CNDH called the incident a "tragedy", called particular attention to the excessive use of force and firearms by state and federal authorities, and specifically found that:

- 207 people (including ten minors) were victims of cruel, inhuman or degrading treatment.
- 145 were arbitrarily arrested.
- 26 women suffered sexual assault.
- 5 foreigners, in addition to suffering violence, were illegally expelled from the country.

In connection with these findings, the CNDH submitted recommendations to the federal Secretary of Public Security, Eduardo Medina Mora; the governor of the state of México, Enrique Peña Nieto; and the commissioner of the National Migration Institute, Hipólito Treviño. These included, inter alia, improved training for the security forces, due compensation for the next-of-kin of the two fatalities and for all those whose human rights were violated, and a review of the expulsion procedures applicable to foreign visitors.

The report concluded that the violence could have been prevented through dialogue, but that "preference was given to the use of public force".

=== Police brutality ===
The National Human Rights Commission has charged that police used excessive force, smashing windows and furniture, and hauling people from their beds. The commission is investigating reports that police molested and raped female detainees and injured children, elderly and the disabled. These findings were subsequently upheld by the Inter-American Court of Human Rights.

== See also ==
- Yo Soy 132

== Sources ==
- San Salvador Atenco in Mutiny! Infoshop.org
- Continuing Struggle Against Violent Repression in San Salvador Atenco, Mexico Cleveland Independent Media Center
- Atenco: A Violent Attack Against The Other Campaign Adherents NarcoNews.com
- Police Brutality in Atenco, Mexico UpsideDownWorld.org
- Police Brutality in Mexico - Znet Zmag.org
- Mexico: police storm Atenco World War 4 Report
- Breve cronología de los acontecimientos en san Salvador Atenco Rebelion.com
- Se cumplen 20 años del surgimiento del FPDT La Jornada
- EL traslado fallido del Aeropuerto Internacional de la Ciudad de México a TexcocoSciELO.org
