= Texcoco de Mora =

- City and municipality
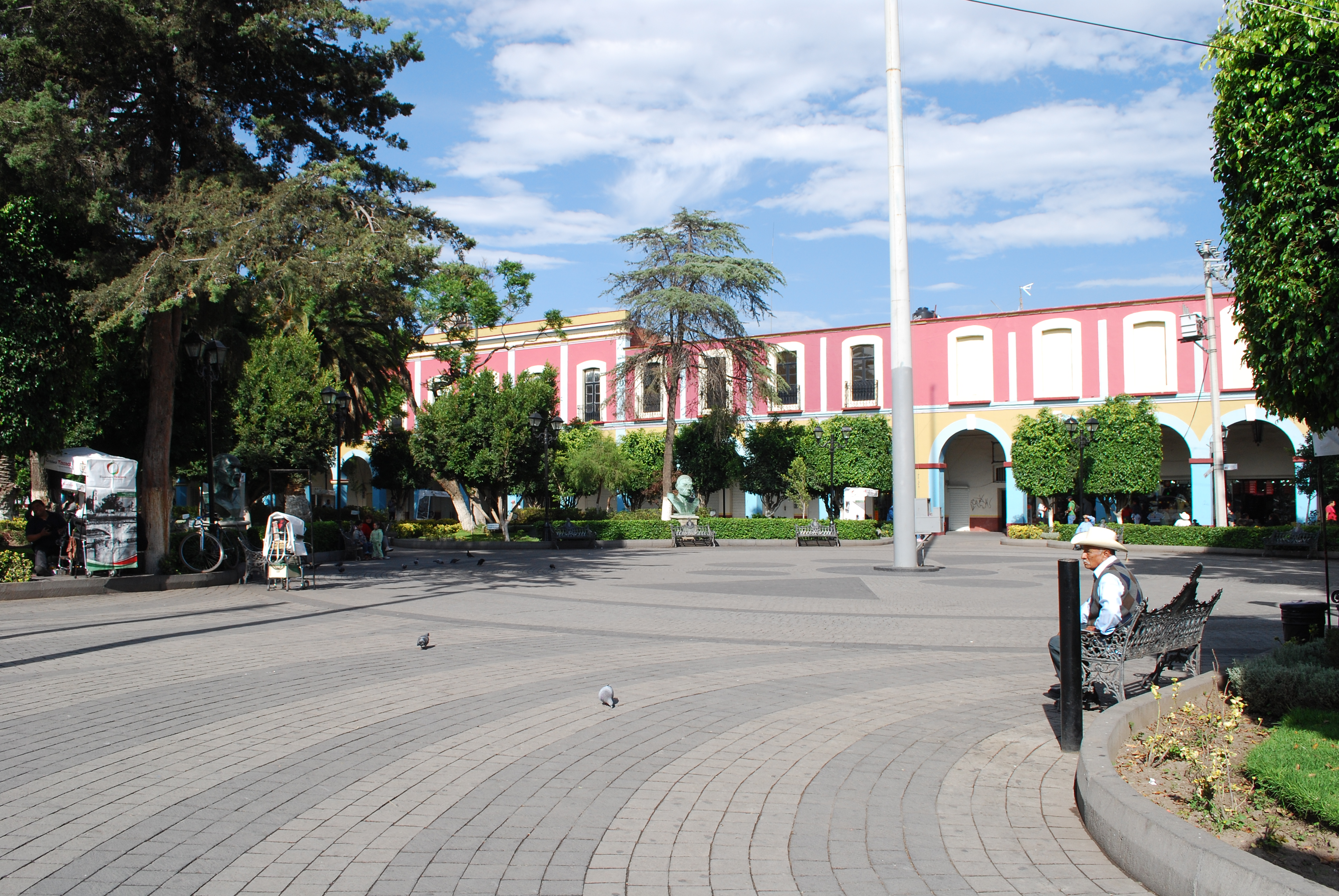
- Part of the main plaza

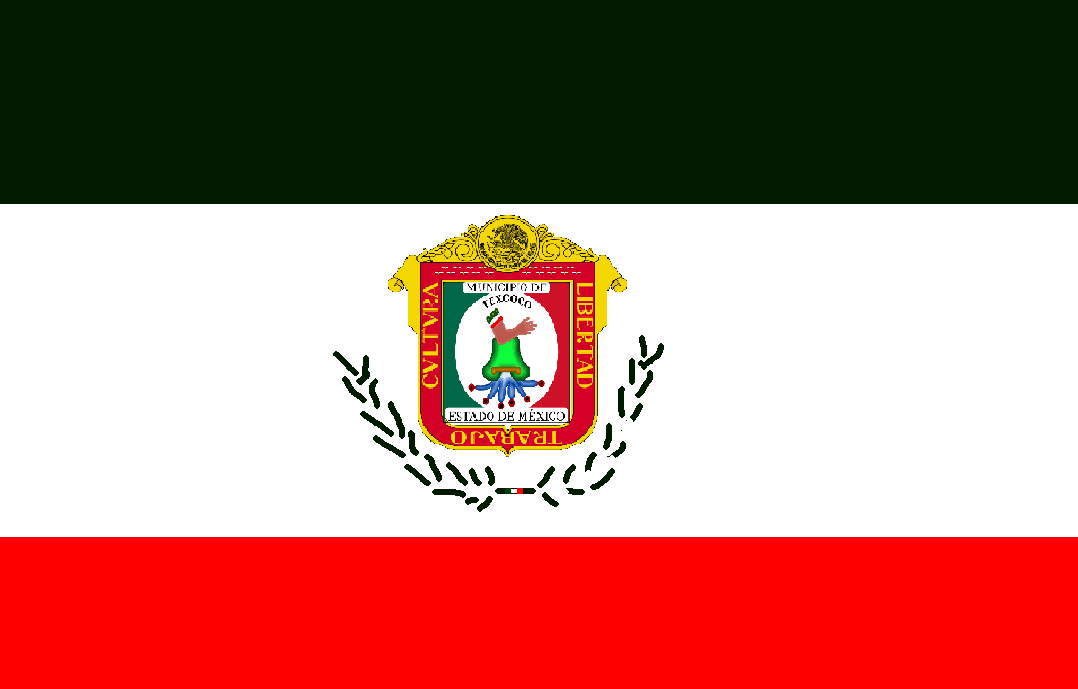
- Flag Coat of arms

- Location in State of Mexico

- Location in Mexico Texcoco de Mora (State of Mexico)
- Coordinates: 19.509°N 98.882°W
- Country: Mexico
- State: State of Mexico
- Founded: 1551 (as Spanish city)
- Municipality Created: 1919

Government
  - Municipal President: Sandra Luz Falcón

Area
  - City: 418.69 km^{2} (161.66 sq mi)
- Elevation (of seat): 2,250 m (7,380 ft)

Population (2020)
  - City: 35,491
  - Municipality: 277,562
- Time zone: UTC-6 (Central)
- Postal code (of seat): 56100
- Website: (in Spanish) Official site

Texcoco de Mora (modern Nahuatl pronunciation, Otomi: Antamäwädehe) is a city located in the State of Mexico, 25 km northeast of Mexico City. Texcoco de Mora is the municipal seat of the municipality of Texcoco. In the pre-Hispanic era, this was a major Aztec city on the shores of Lake Texcoco. After the Conquest, the city was initially the second most important after Mexico City, but its importance faded over time, becoming more rural in character. Over the colonial and post-independence periods, most of Lake Texcoco was drained and the city is no longer on the shore and much of the municipality is on lakebed. Numerous Aztec archeological finds have been discovered here, including the 125 tonne stone statue of Chalchiuhtlicue, which was found near San Miguel Coatlinchán and now resides at the Museum of Anthropology in Mexico City.

Much of Texcoco's recent history involves the clash of the populace with local, state and federal authorities. The most serious of these is the continued attempts to develop an airport here, which despite the saturation of the current Mexico City airport, is opposed by local residents. The city and municipality is home to a number of archeological sites, such as the palace of Nezahualcoyotl, Texcotzingo (Baths of Nezahualcoyotl) and Huexotla. Other important sites include the Cathedral, the Juanino Monastery, and Chapingo Autonomous University. The most important annual festival is the Feria Internacional del Caballo (International Fair of the Horse), which showcases the area's mostly agricultural economic base.

== Toponymy ==
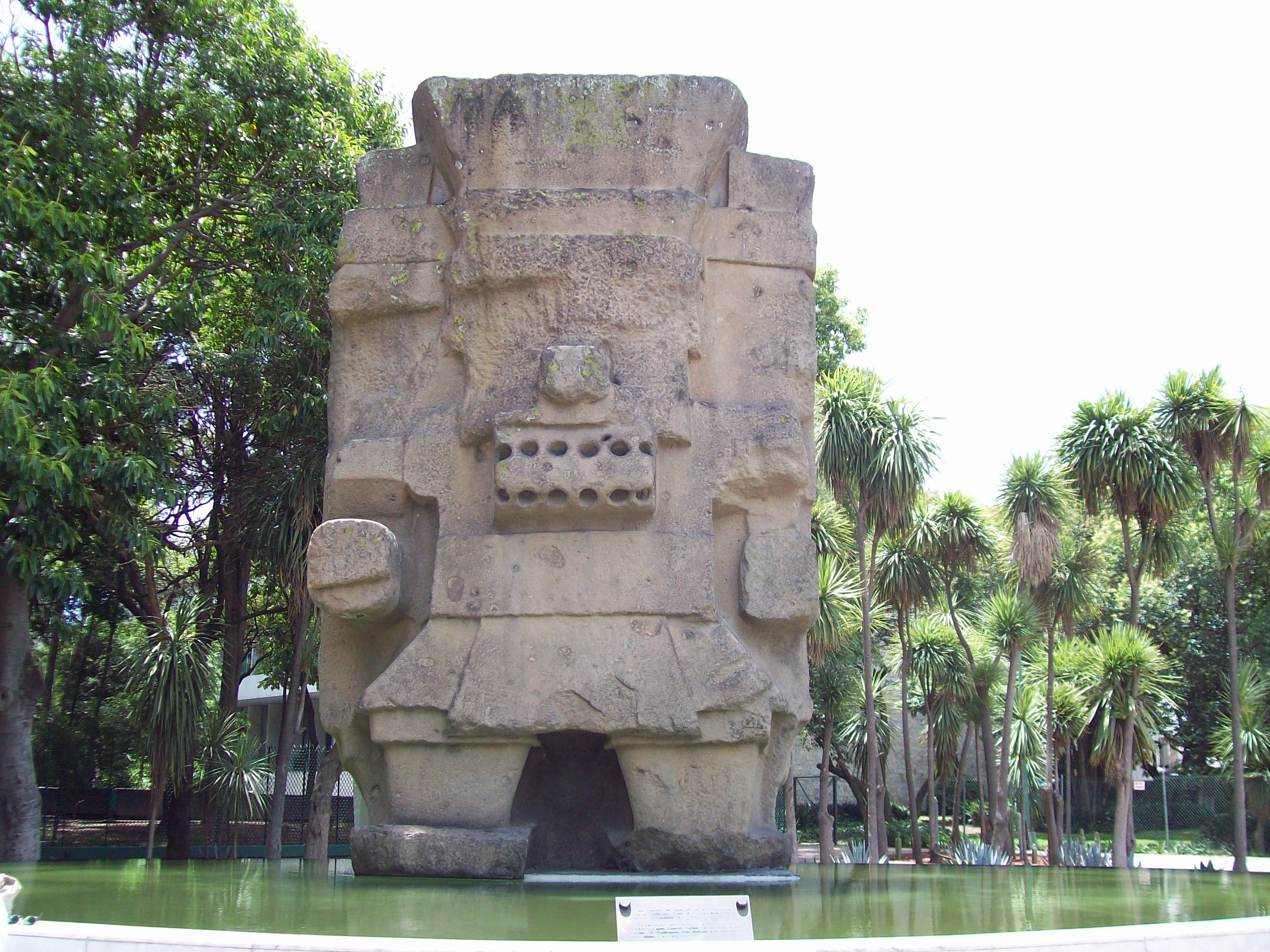
Statue of Tlaloc moved to Mexico City

The official name of the municipality is Texcoco and the official name of the city is Texcoco de Mora, in honor of Dr. José María Luis Mora. However, both are commonly called Texcoco. The name has been spelled a number of other ways over the city's history including Tetzcuco, Tezcoco and Tezcuco (Nahuatl pronunciation). The name is derived from Nahuatl and most likely means "among the jarilla (Larrea) which grow in crags". However, there are a number of glyph representations for the place that have appeared the Codex Azcatitlán, the Codex Cruz, the Quinantzin Map and other early colonial documents and this translation cannot be verified 100%.

== History ==
=== Pre-Columbian ===
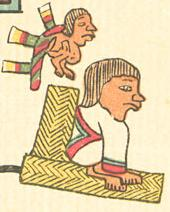
Nezahualcoyotl, ruler of Acolhuacan

The Paleontological Museum in Tocuila displays part of one of the richest deposits of Late Pleistocene fauna in the Americas, found in an ancient river mouth that used to flow into Lake Texcoco. While there is no exact date for the first human settlements in Texcoco, it is likely that the first people here were Toltec or from Teotihuacan. The Xolotl, Tolotzin and Quinatzin Codices indicate that the first people here were ethnically Chichimeca. This tribe is credited for founding a province known in pre-Hispanic Valley of Mexico as Acolhuacan.

The most notable rulers of Acolhuacan, who resided in Texcoco were Nopaltzin, Tlotzin Pochotl, Quinatzin Tlaltecatzin, Techotlalatzin, Ixtlixochitl El Viejo, Nezahualcoyotl, Nezahualpilli and Cacamatzin. All of these rulers were considered to be great warriors and priests who influenced the history of this valley. The most prominent of these rulers was Nezahualcoyotl who was one of the founders of the Aztec Triple Alliance. During his forty-year reign, the arts, culture and architecture flourished in the dominion.

=== Colonial period ===
Hernán Cortés initially arrived to Texcoco in 1519, while Cacamatzin was leader. Here the brigantines to attack Tenochtitlan were constructed in 1521. On Juárez Street there is an obelisk which marks this event. After the Spanish conquest of the Aztec Empire, Franciscan friars came to Texcoco to evangelize, principally Juan de Tecto, Juan de Ayora and Pedro de Gante. Gante founded the first primary school in Mesoamerica, teaching Latin, Spanish, sewing, carpentry and knitting. He also wrote the first catechism in Nahuatl. In the north of the Texcoco cathedral, there is a chapel named after him.

In 1551, indigenous leader Fernando Pimentel y Alvarado petitioned to have Texcoco recognized as a city by the Spanish Crown. This petition was granted and it received a coat of arms. While the overall style of the coat of arms is Spanish, the emblems inside, such as a coyote and a warrior with headdress are Aztec. In the very early colonial period, Texcoco was the second most important city in New Spain.

=== Post-independence ===
Despite its initial importance, Texcoco did not develop as a major city like some of its neighbors during the colonial period and for much of the post-independence period. It was mostly important for fishing and agriculture. From 1827 to 1830, Texcoco was the second capital of the State of Mexico, until it was moved to San Agustín de las Cuevas, today Tlalpan. Texcoco became the head of one of the districts of Mexico State in 1837. The appendage of "de Mora" was added in 1861. In 1919, it became a modern municipality.

Leopoldo Flores found a massive 125 tonne Tlaloc statue at Texcoco in 1903. Today, the statue stands in front of the National Museum of Anthropology in Mexico City; the local population resisted the relocation of the sculpture, even sabotaging the vehicles that came for it. There has been a proposal to install a 1:1 replica at the original site, with artists studying over 1,500 photographs of the original.

In 2003, archeologists sponsored by the National Geographic, University of Michigan and the Universidad Autónoma de Chapingo discovered a number of pre-Hispanic artifacts in an area which has been proposed for building an airport. The finds are at areas that are or were the shores of Lake Texcoco and sheds light on water tables over the centuries. Some of the pieces found include ceramics, utensils and ceremonial objects.

In 2005, traditional crafts vendors blocked the main roads of the historic center of Texcoco to demand that they not be relocated away from the city cathedral. They state that the area is an important meeting point especially on holidays. It is estimated that 1,500 people depend on sales made here during festivals such as Day of the Dead, Candelaria, Christmas and Independence Day.

In 2006, there were outbreaks of violence among merchants and farmers versus police in Texcoco and neighboring San Salvador Atenco, blocking the Texcoco-Lechería highway. The merchants were from the Belisario Dominguez market in Texcoco who have been denied public space in which to sell their merchandise, mostly flowers. State and federal police have blocked the area which the flower vendors used just outside the market proper. Supporters of the flower sellers from San Salvador Atenco have intervened in both the talks and the blocking of roads in protest.

== Government ==
As the seat of the municipality, the city of Texcoco is the local government for over 160 other communities which cover a territory of 418.69 km. About 47% of the municipality's population lives in the city proper. The main communities outside the city proper include San Felipe, San Miguel Tocuila, Santiaguito, Santa María Tulantongo, San Bernardino, Montecillo, Unidad Habitacional Embotelladores, Xocotlán and Santa Inés. The municipality borders the municipalities of San Salvador Atenco, Tepetlaoxtoc, Papalotla, Chiautla, Chiconcuac, Chimalhuacán, Chicoloapan, Ixtapaluca, Ciudad Nezahualcóyotl, Ecatepec as well as the states of Tlaxcala and Puebla to the north and east and Mexico City to the southwest.

The city is divided into 19 sectors and 55 communities. The main communities are Barrio San Pedro, El Xolache I, El Xolache II, Joyas de San Mateo, San Juanito, Santa Úrsula, Niños Héroes, Valle de Santa Cruz, El Centro, Las Salinas, Las Américas, San Lorenzo, El Carmen, San Mateo, San Martín, La Conchita, Joyas de Santa Ana and Zaragoza.

== Geography ==
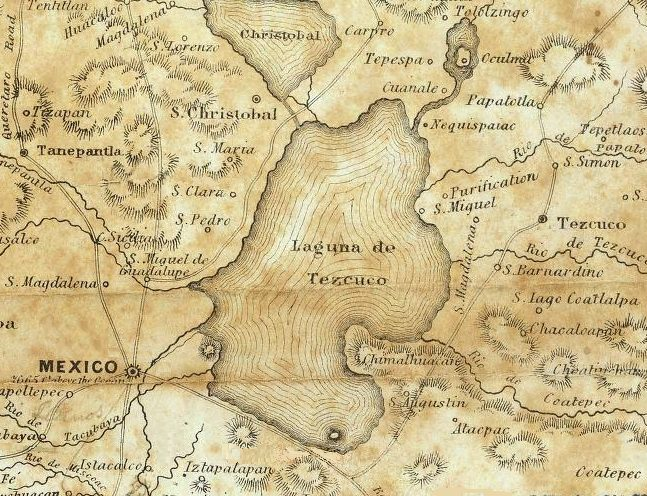
Map of Lake Texcoco

Tescoco lies about 25 km east of the centre of Mexico City. Major elevations in the municipality include the Tlaloc Mountain (4,500 meters) the Tetzcutzinco, Moyotepec and Tecuachacho. Most elevations are named after the major community to be found on them. There are also a number of small canyons. Part of the municipality used to be covered by Lake Texcoco, but most of this lake has since been drained. The rivers that fed it, such as the Cozcacuaco, the Chapingo and the San Bernardino still exist.

The city of Texcoco used to be located on the shore of Lake Texcoco. This lake covered an area of 9,600 km2, but since early colonial times, floods or fears of flooding have led to various drainage projects, which over time has nearly destroyed the lake completely. Starting in the 1970s and continuing to the present day, there have been efforts to clean the polluted remnants of the lake. The remains of Lake Texcoco extend about 1,700 hectares in which aquatic birds and migratory birds from the U.S. and Canada can still be seen.

The climate is temperate and semi-arid with a median temperature of 15.9 °C, and few frosts. Most rains come between the months of June and October. The higher peaks have forests of conifers and oaks while the drier lowlands have semi desert vegetation. Animal life includes deer, coyotes and ocelots, as well as smaller mammals. The municipality has lost a number of larger bird species such as the falcon, eagle and buzzard. Smaller birds such as swallows, canaries and others remain. Except for rattlesnakes, almost all reptiles have disappeared.

Climate data for Chapingo (1991–2020 normals, extremes 1952–present)
Month	Jan	Feb	Mar	Apr	May	Jun	Jul	Aug	Sep	Oct	Nov	Dec	Year
Record high °C (°F)	35.5 (95.9)	33.5 (92.3)	35 (95)	36.5 (97.7)	37.5 (99.5)	35 (95)	30.5 (86.9)	30 (86)	31 (88)	32 (90)	32 (90)	31 (88)	37.5 (99.5)
Mean daily maximum °C (°F)	22.7 (72.9)	23.9 (75.0)	26.2 (79.2)	27.4 (81.3)	27.5 (81.5)	25.1 (77.2)	23.6 (74.5)	23.8 (74.8)	23.4 (74.1)	23.8 (74.8)	23.7 (74.7)	22.6 (72.7)	24.5 (76.1)
Daily mean °C (°F)	12.7 (54.9)	13.8 (56.8)	16.2 (61.2)	17.8 (64.0)	18.6 (65.5)	18.1 (64.6)	17.1 (62.8)	17.1 (62.8)	16.8 (62.2)	15.8 (60.4)	14.2 (57.6)	13.0 (55.4)	15.9 (60.6)
Mean daily minimum °C (°F)	2.6 (36.7)	3.8 (38.8)	6.2 (43.2)	8.3 (46.9)	9.8 (49.6)	11.1 (52.0)	10.6 (51.1)	10.4 (50.7)	10.2 (50.4)	7.7 (45.9)	4.7 (40.5)	3.4 (38.1)	7.4 (45.3)
Record low °C (°F)	−8.5 (16.7)	−7 (19)	−5 (23)	−1.5 (29.3)	1.5 (34.7)	4.5 (40.1)	4 (39)	2 (36)	−1.5 (29.3)	−3 (27)	−5 (23)	−6.5 (20.3)	−8.5 (16.7)
Average precipitation mm (inches)	11.0 (0.43)	7.6 (0.30)	14.4 (0.57)	28.7 (1.13)	50.0 (1.97)	111.0 (4.37)	125.2 (4.93)	111.8 (4.40)	89.8 (3.54)	44.2 (1.74)	8.1 (0.32)	5.5 (0.22)	607.3 (23.91)
Average precipitation days (≥ 0.01 mm)	2.6	2.5	4.5	8.5	11.8	17.6	22.0	20.8	16.7	8.6	3.0	2.0	120.6
Source: Servicio Meteorológico Nacional

== Economy ==
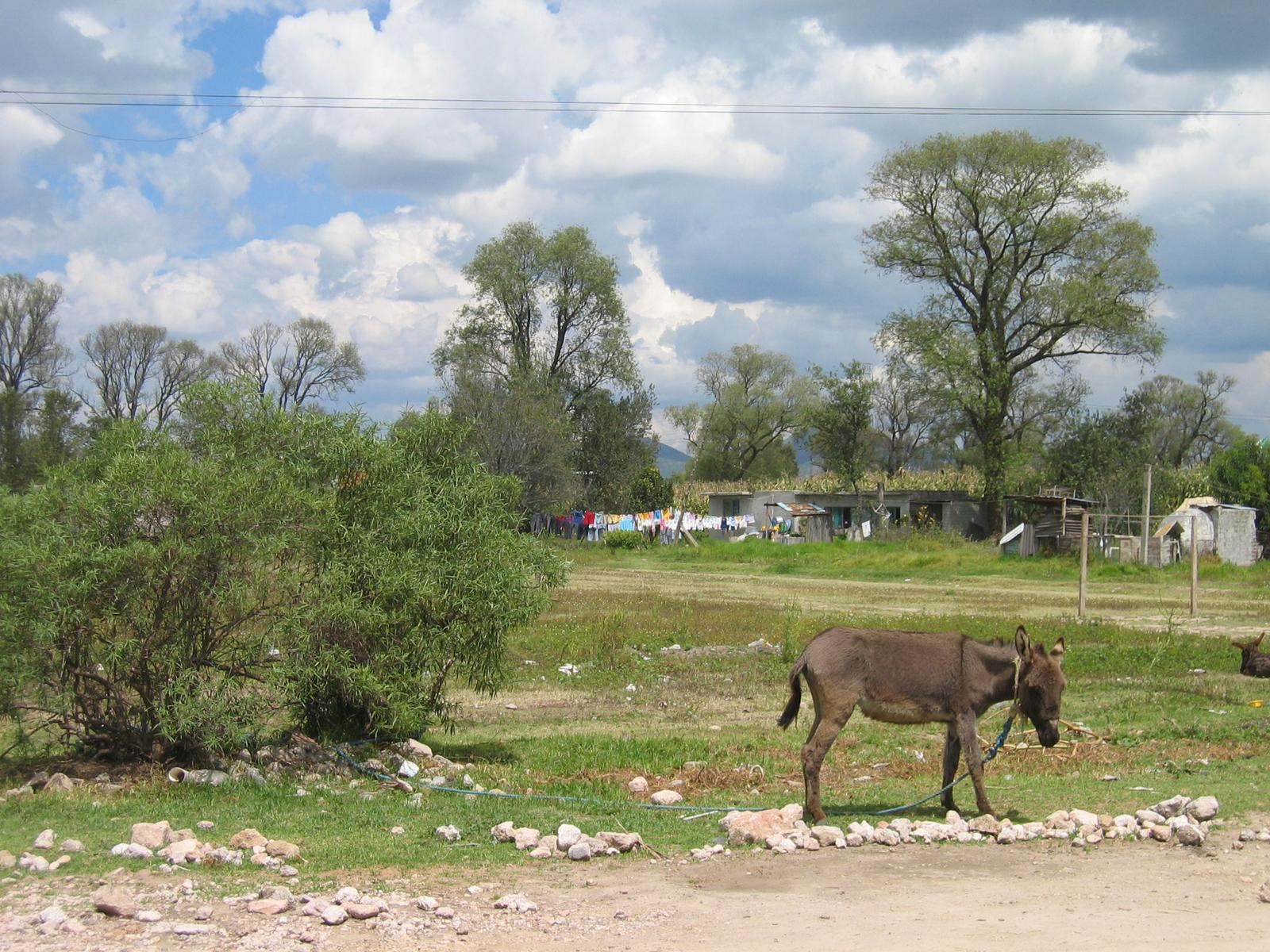
Ejido in the community of Tocuila

The city and municipality still keep much of its rural nature, lacking the heavy industry that many of its neighbors have. This requires that many residents here commute to other locations to work, such as Mexico City, Ecatepec and Tlalnepantla. The large volume of traffic that passes through the municipality via highways results in smog.

About 60% of the municipality is either forest or tree farms. About 25% of the land is used for agriculture. Most agriculture is based on family farms which produce avocados, plums, apples and pears as well as corn, beans, barley, wheat, maguey and nopal. Floriculture began in this municipality in the mid 20th century and is practices intensively in the communities of San Simón, San José Texopan, San Diego, San Miguel Coatlinchan, San Miguel Tlaixpan and San Nicolás Tlaminca. Most livestock is dairy cattle produced on ranches such as Xalapango, La Pría, Granja La Castilla, Establo México, Santa Rosa, Santa Mónica and La Moreda. Industry is a very recent development, mostly associated with agriculture. The main craft produced here is blown glass.

== Culture and community ==
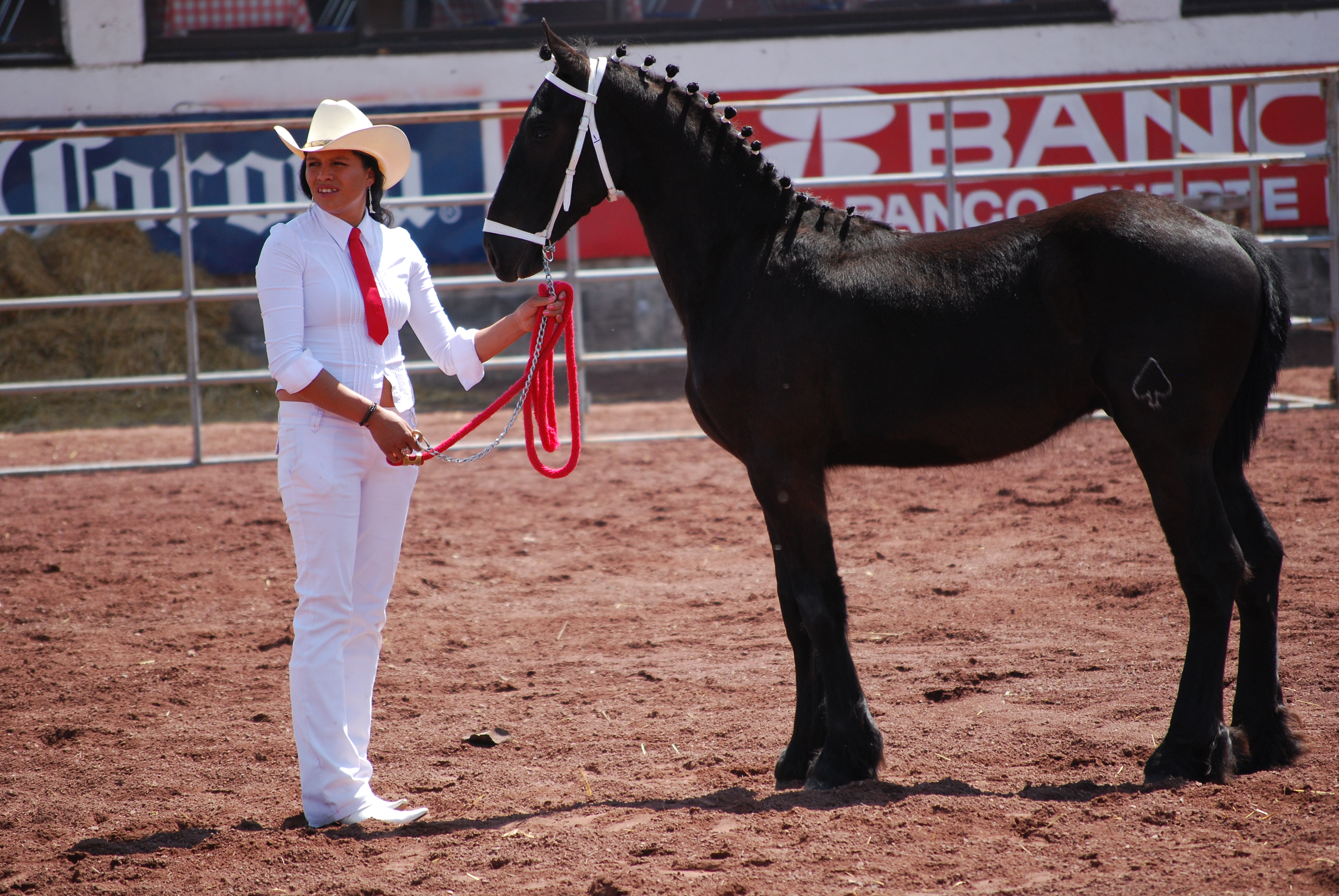
Presenter and horse at the 2010 Feria de Caballo

In the early 1970s, an idea emerged to create a regional fair to represent Texcoco to the rest of Mexico, exhibiting its agriculture and livestock. The first Feria de las Flores was held in 1975, however, it was not successful. In 1978, the focus of the fair was changed to horses, creating the first Feria Internacional del Caballo (International Fair of the Horse), for which a number of installations were built such as a bullring, an open-air theatre, a kiosk, stables, corrals, music stage and exhibition halls. This version of the festival has been successful and held yearly ever since. The Feria occurs at the end of March and includes musical shows, cockfights, open-air theatre and expositions of livestock, commerce and crafts, with one of the main events being bullfighting. Traditional crafts include blown glass, clay and ceramics, and painted dried plants which are a traditional decoration for Christmas here.

The city also holds an annual cultural festival called the Festival Cultural Nezahualcoyotl. Artists which have appeared at the event include Los Hermanos Carrión, Roberto Jordan and José Luis Rodríguez "El Puma." In 2008, the festival had its first international participants, with Filippa Giorgano coming from Italy and the group Los Bunkers from Chile. The ten-day event has activities related to dance, music, painting, crafts readings and culture.

The Feria de la Cazuela occurs in July in Santa Cruz de Arriba, very close to the city. This events includes traditional crafts especially pots, jars, plates and trays.

The ex Hacienda of El Molino de Flores, now the Molino de Flores Nezahualcóyotl National Park, is located three km east of the city and used to produce pulque and grains. Most of the buildings on the site, such as the main house, the church of San Joaquin and the Chapel of Señor de la Presa (Lord of the Dam), were constructed by Miguel de Cervantes and his wife. According to tradition, the chapel was named for an apparition of Christ which supposedly occurred on the rocks that border the Cuxcahuaco which crosses this property. The chapel is built out of the rockface, much like the temple at Malinalco. The hacienda reached its peak in the late 19th and early 20th century. After the Mexican Revolution, it was abandoned and it deteriorated. The hacienda was declared a national park by President Lázaro Cárdenas in 1937. Due to its style and condition, the hacienda has been used as a set for Mexican and foreign films.

== Landmarks ==
The historic center of the city contains the palace of Nezahualcoyotl, the Cathedral and the Chapel of Gante as well as a Casa de Cultura, which contains a small museum. The Palace of Nezahualcoyotl is also known as the archeological zone of Ahuehuetitlan or the Cerrito de los Melones. The palace had at least 300 rooms, five courtyards, a Mesoamerican ball court and an area called Tleotlapan (land of gods) which was a shrine with a nine-story pyramid. In the great halls were places where Nezahualcoyotl and his wife received visitors and where the scholarly and priestly elite congregated. There are also rooms dedicated to music, poetry and astronomy.

The Mexico State Constituent Congress ratified the state's first constitution at the former Juanino Monastery. The Casa de Cultura contains murals done by artist José Marin and contains various chapters of the history of Mexico. Puerto de Bergantines is the location where Hernán Cortés built brigantines and set sail from to attack Tenochtitlan by water in 1521. This site is marked by an obelisk.

The most important archeological site outside of the city is the site of Tetzcutiznco or Tetzcotzingo, but is popularly called the Baths of Nezahualcoyotl. It is located on a hill in the community of San Miguel Tlaminca. The site consists of a sophisticated hydraulic system, terraces, shrines, thrones and dwellings. About six structures have been completely excavated and are open to visitors. The site was a retreat for Nezahualcoyotl which reached its peak at about 1466 covering 120 hectares.

The hydraulic system includes ten km of canals and a four km aqueduct that transported water from San Pablo Izayo, nine km away on Tlaloc Mountain. The site was mistakenly believed to be baths due to the large water storage tanks found on the site. However, the water was used not for bathing but rather to water the elaborate gardens which had plants brought from Veracruz, Oaxaca and other parts of Mesoamerica. The idea that these were baths can be traced back to the paintings made of them by José María Velasco in the late 19th century.

Another myth about the site is that there were tunnels that led all the way to Teotihuacan. In reality, the underground passages are believed to have been caves that were dynamited when North American soldiers were looking for treasure in 1847. Excavation work by INAH began in 1981, but much of the site is still unexcavated. The site has suffered damage from vandalism and graffiti, including a portion called the Patio of the Gods, where ceremonies to mark the spring equinox and the birthday of Nezahualcoyotl (August 28) are still held.

In San Luis Huexotla, there is another archeological zone with a circular pyramid dedicated to Ehecatl. There are also remains of a wall and a Mesoamerican ball court. The monastery of San Luis was constructed in 1627 is located on one side of this site. It is of Baroque style and considered to be one of the smallest complexes of its type in the Americas.

These archaeological sites, as well as the Palace of Nezahualcoyotl in the city proper, are not promoted for tourism and they have little infrastructure for visitors.

== Transport ==
There are frequent bus services to Metro Indios Verdes, a terminus of the Mexico City Metro.

Attempts to develop an airport that would either supplement or replace the current Mexico City airport have been made since the latter half of the 1990s either here, neighboring San Salvador Atenco or even as far as Tizayuca, Hidalgo. Residents of both Texcoco and San Salvador Atenco have been vehemently opposed to any airport construction in their municipalities. Violent protests erupted in Texcoco in 2001 and 2002 with threats against public officials, which garnered much national and international press coverage. The need for a replacement or supplement airport still exists despite the addition of a second terminal to the current one. The last proposal to develop an airport in Texcoco was made in 2008.

== Education ==
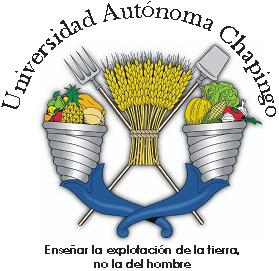
Chapingo university logo

Just south of the city limits is the Texcoco's most notable institution of higher education the Chapingo Autonomous University. The university is a federal public institution of higher education. It offers technical and full bachelor's degrees as well as having scientific and technological research programs. Many of these programs are related to agriculture, forestry and fishing.

The school began as the Escuela Nacional de Agricultura (National School of Agriculture) which was founded in 1854 at the Monastery of San Jacinto in Mexico City. The school was moved in 1923 to the ex Hacienda of Chapingo President Álvaro Obregón. Postgraduate studies were added in 1959. The school received autonomous status in 1978. It offers courses of study in Forestry, Agricultural Economics, Agricultural Industries, Irrigation, Rural Sociology and more.

The main attraction for visitors at this school is its murals. In the old hacienda chapel, which is now the University Ceremonies Room is a mural by Diego Rivera called “Tierra Fecundada” (Fertile Land). This work was begun in 1924 and completed in 1927. Covering an area of over 700m2, the work divides into three parts. The left panel depicts man's struggle to have land, the right panel shows the evolution of Mother Nature and the center shows the communion between man and earth. It is considered to be one of Rivera's best works.

More recently, the school acquired an unnamed mural by Luis Nishizawa. This work was produced during his last year at the Escuela Nacional de Artes Plasticas (ENAP) of UNAM and depicts the agriculture of Mexico in both the past and the present. The work is six meters high, nine meters wide and in the form of a triangle. It is placed in a building that is commonly called “El Partenon.” The school is also home to the National Museum of Agriculture. This installation covers about 2,000m2 and covers the development of agriculture in Mexico from the pre-Hispanic past to the present day. The collection has about 4,000 objects relating to technology, agronomy including farming implements and photographs by Hanz Gutmann.

Other educational institution located in the city include the Centro Universitario UAEM Texcoco and the Universidad del Valle de Mexico. The latter was opened in a two-story building in 2004 and contains a large library which is open to the public.

== Religious sites ==
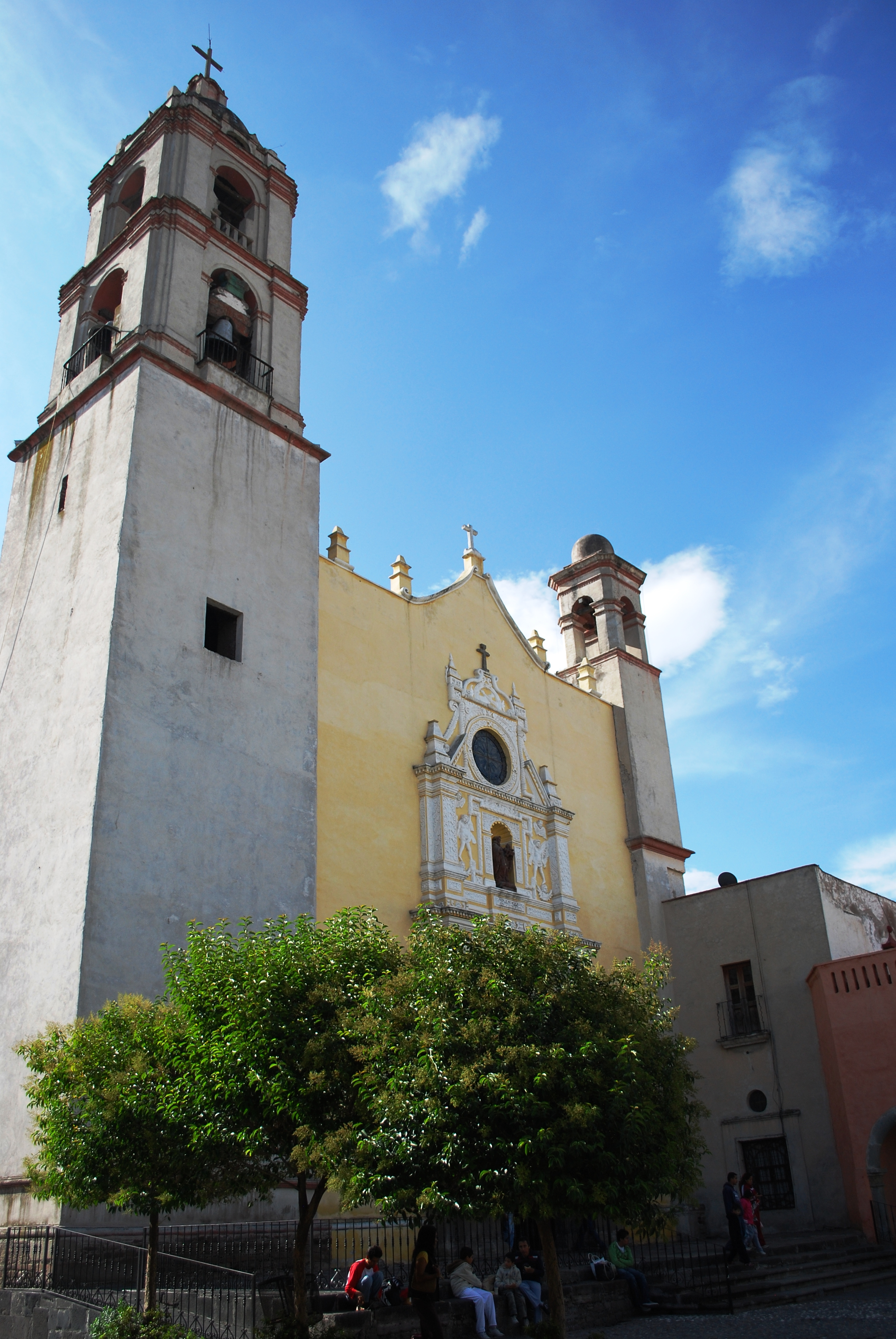
Facade of the cathedral

The cathedral was originally built on the site of a 16th-century Franciscan monastery. Later, it was rebuilt in 1664 as the Parish of San Antonio de Padua. The complex also housed the first European-style school for natives in Mesoamerica, and the Latin alphabet can be seen on some of its columns. Fragments of the portal, the Latin cross layout of the temple and the open chapel are all that is left of the original 16th century monastery. The feast day of the Anthony of Padua, the city's patron saint is celebrated on 13 June. Another festival if the Molino de Flores (Flower Windmill) which takes place on Pentecost. Juan Manuel Mancilla Sanchez was named bishop of the diocese of Texcoco in 2009.

== Sport ==
Emperadores de Texcoco play in the Mexican Football League Second Division at the Papalotla Stadium.

== Media ==
La Uni-K (XHOEX-FM) is a noncommercial, social community radio station broadcasting on 89.3 FM.

== Notable people ==
=== Mayors ===
- Mauricio Valdéz Rodríguez (1973–1975)
- Silverio Pérez (1976–1978)
- Isidro Burgos Cuevas (1991–1993)
- Héctor Terraza González (1994–1996)
- Jorge de la Vega (1996–2000)
- Horacio Duarte (2000–2003)
- Higinio Martínez Miranda (2003–2006)
- Constanzo de la Vega (2006–2009)
- Amado Acosta García (2009–2012)
- Arturo Martinez Alfaro (2012–2013)
- Delfina Gómez Álvarez (2013–2015)
- Joel Huerta (2015–2020)

== See also ==
- Texcoco (altepetl)
