= Mexico City Airport (disambiguation) =

Mexico City International Airport, officially called "Benito Juárez International Airport", is an international airport that serves Greater Mexico City, Mexico.

Mexico City Airport may also refer to:

- Felipe Ángeles International Airport opened in 2022 at Santa Lucía, Zumpango, State of Mexico
- Mexico City Texcoco Airport, a partially built, canceled airport
