= Colonia La Cuarta Transformación =

Neighborhood of Tultitlán, Mexico

La Cuarta Transformación
- Neighborhood
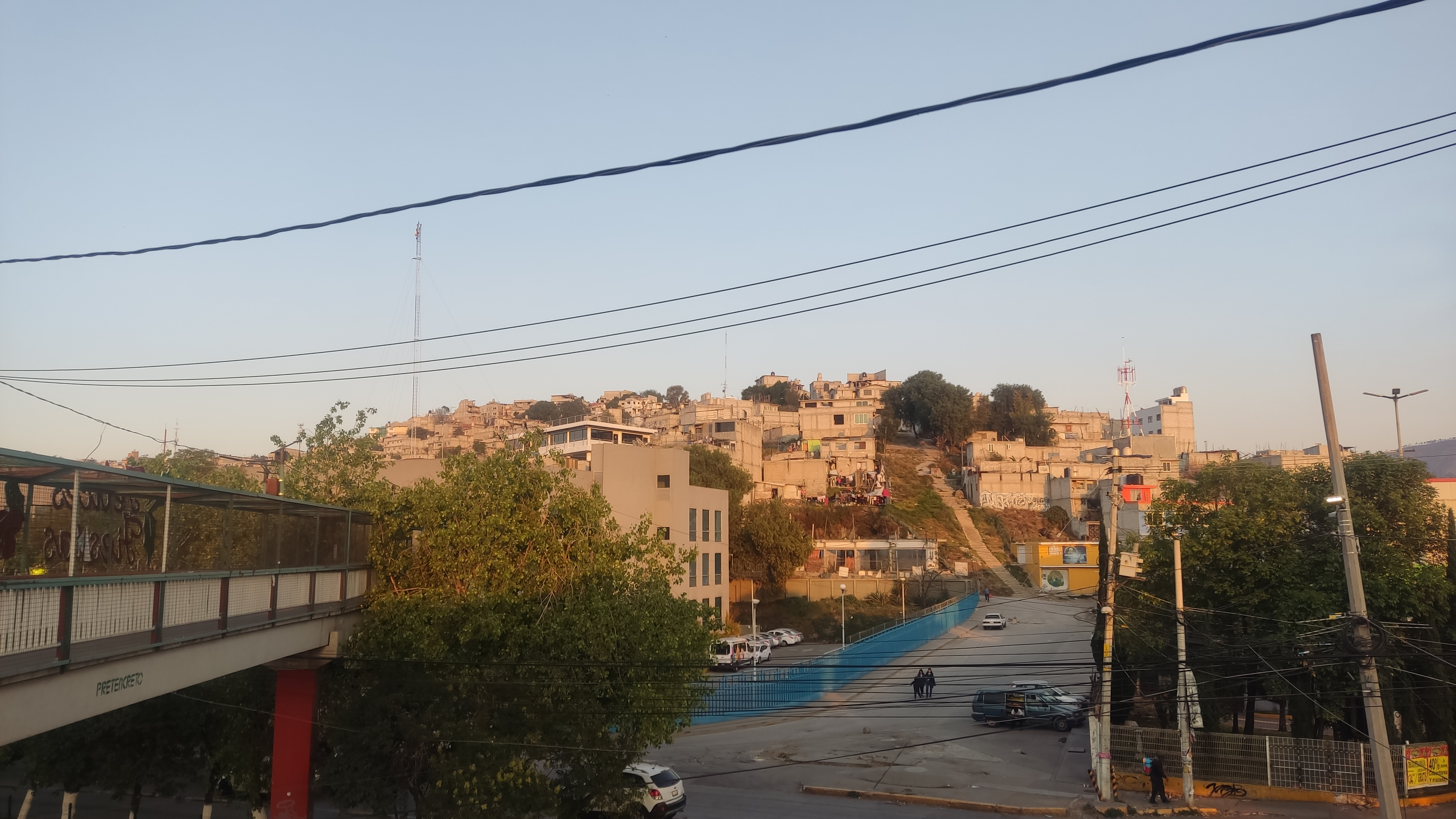
- Etymology: Fourth Transformation
- Nicknames: Fimesa, El Paraje
- Location within Mexico City urban area
- Coordinates: 19°35′59″N 99°10′45″W
- Country: Mexico
- Municipality: Tultitlán Municipality
- Colonia: 20 November 2024; 23 months ago (disputed)
- Founder: Municipal government of Tultitlán

Area
  - Total: 0.27 km^{2} (0.10 sq mi)
- Postal code: 54958

Colonia La Cuarta Transformación is a neighborhood (Spanish: colonia) in Tultitlán Municipality, State of Mexico. It was originally part of the ejido San Francisco Chilpan. In November 2024, under the administration of Elena García Martínez—the outgoing municipal president and member of the Morena political party—three areas—Fimesa II, Fimesa III, and El Paraje—were merged to form the colonia. The municipal authorities established it without prior notice or consultation with local residents and modified the postal codes. A few weeks later, in December, García Martínez's successor, Ana María Castro Fernández, installed the street signs reflecting the name changes.

Previously, the streets had different thematic names, primarily related to flora. Following the modification, they were renamed after concepts and projects associated with Andrés Manuel López Obrador, who served as president of Mexico from 2018 to 2024 and the founder and former leader of Morena. During his tenure, López Obrador promoted the political platform known as the Fourth Transformation (La cuarta transformación).

Residents expressed dissatisfaction with the name change, who expressed concern over the administrative burden of updating personal documents. In response, they removed the street signs, and the state authorities agreed to suspend the name changes until a public consultation could be conducted, an action opposed by municipal authorities.

== History ==
Fimesa, otherwise known as El Paraje, is part of a former ejido named San Francisco Chilpan, which lost its legal status in 1964 and was incorporated into of the Tultitlán Municipality, according to its municipal records. Like many former ejidos, the area became an irregular communal settlement, where people settle in abandoned land. Ejidos are areas that often lack essential infrastructure, including paved roads, drainage, or electricity. The settlement lies within the Sierra de Guadalupe mountain range in the State of Mexico. Due to its terrain, the streets are inclined, and unpaved roads become muddy during the rainy season.

For years, residents have faced conflicts with municipal authorities. In April 2023, the municipal government entered Fimesa II and evicted several families, demolishing at least ten residences without prior notice—some while residents were still inside. Several inhabitants have reported having purchased their land a decade earlier. In response, neighbors blocked the nearby Avenida Vía José López Portillo in protest. The government of the State of Mexico agreed to deploy personnel from the state's attorney general's office to file criminal complaints on behalf of those affected. The municipal government maintained that the properties were not legally available for sale and accused groups of ejidatarios of misleading the residents. By August 2024, approximately 300 lawsuits had been filed, including amparo actions, administrative proceedings, and civil cases. Neighbors have commented that the expropriations were intended to make way for the construction of the Fidel Castro High School.

Francisco Fuentes, the lawyer representing the residents, stated that the inhabitants of El Paraje already possess property deeds, while those in Fimesa II and Fimesa III are undergoing a regularization process. He also explained that in the municipal decrees issued prior to 2024, recognized the three neighborhoods as part of officially acknowledged territories. Fuentes further mentioned that, although an expropriation occurred in 1964, these areas were not included in it, as confirmed by a report from the Attorney General of Mexico.

== Establishment ==
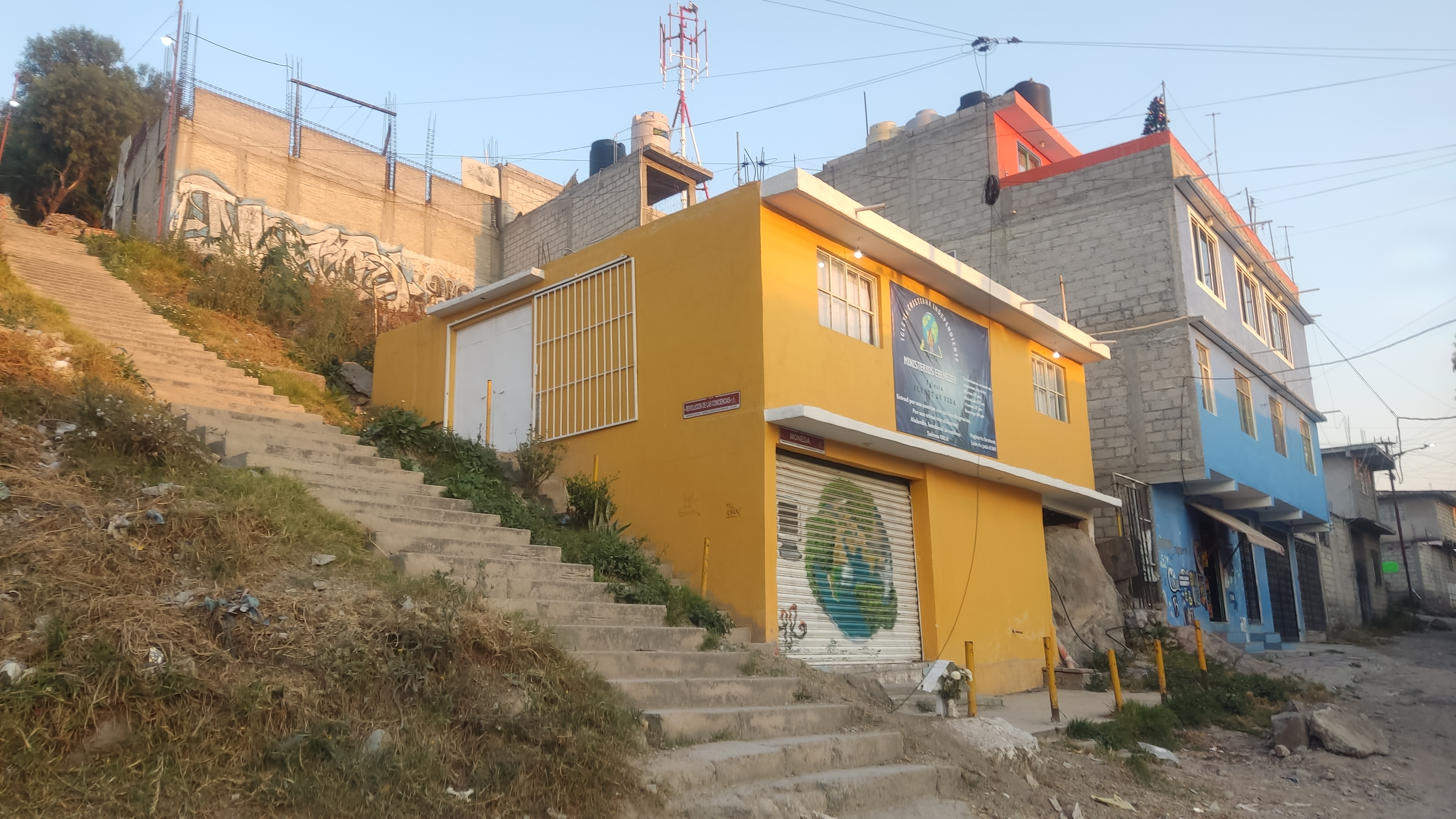
The corner of Avenida Moneda and Calle Revolución de las Conciencias as of December 2024

On 20 November 2024, Elena García Martínez, the outgoing municipal president of Tultitlán and member of the Morena political party, established the colonia (neighborhood) of La Cuarta Transformación. The colonia was formed by merging Fimesa II, Fimesa III, and El Paraje. The decision was approved during a municipal council session and implemented without prior notice to the residents.

On 3 December 2024, the municipal government of Tultitlán, led by Ana María Castro Fernández—successor of García Martínez, and member of the same political party—began installing street signs reflecting the creation of the neighborhood, La Cuarta Transformación (the Fourth Transformation). The term refers to the political platform created by Andrés Manuel López Obrador, president of Mexico from 2018 to 2024. The streets were renamed after projects, concepts, and phrases associated with López Obrador. A public notice from the municipality stated that, beginning in 2025, residents could start updating their address information, while still being allowed to use their former address for any necessary procedures.

=== Streets ===
The municipal government renamed 45 streets, all marked with maroon nameplates evoking the colors of the Morena party. Only two streets, Calle de las Flores and Avenida Moneda, retained their previous names. Residents photographed and reported that these streets had initially been renamed "Acúsalos con Su Mamá"—"Snitch on them to their mothers", a phrase said by López Obrador when encouraging people to report criminals to their families—and "Me Canso, Ganso" (a word play meaning "I'm Not Giving Up"), a phrase popularized by López Obrador during his presidential inauguration. The municipal government denied assigning those names. Eslie Ellian Reyes Barrera, legal adviser of the Tultitlán City Council, explained that because the area was irregular, the former names and postal codes were unofficial.

List of streets
| Name | References | Notes |
|---|---|---|
| Aeropuerto Felipe Ángeles | Felipe Ángeles International Airport in the State of Mexico | Formerly Fresno |
| Aeropuerto Tulum | Tulum International Airport in Quintana Roo | |
| Áreas Naturales Protegidas | Protected natural areas of Mexico | |
| Apoyo a la Cultura | Support for Mexican culture | |
| Banco del Bienestar | Banco del Bienestar banking institutions | |
| Becas Benito Juárez | Scholarship payments provided by the Secretariat of Welfare | Formerly Prolongación Pirules |
| Bien Pesca | A fishing program, Bienpesca, part of the Secretariat of Welfare | |
| Caminos Artesanales | Public roads built by communities, part of the Secretariat of Infrastructure, Communications and Transportation | |
| Canasta Alimentaria | A market basket program, part of the Secretariat of Welfare | |
| Corredor Interoceánico | Interoceanic Corridor of the Isthmus of Tehuantepec transit route | |
| Crédito a la Palabra | Credits provided to individuals registered with the Secretariat of Welfare without requiring additional paperwork. | |
| El Insurgente | El Insurgente train connecting the State of Mexico with Mexico City | |
| De las Flores | | Unchanged |
| Fertilizantes para el Bienestar | A fertilizer program, part of the Secretariat of Welfare | |
| Guardia Nacional | The National Guard institution, formerly a civil gendarmerie that was merged into the Secretariat of National Defense | |
| IMSS Bienestar | IMSS Bienestar, which was created following the dissolution of the Institute of Health for Welfare; part of the Secretariat of Health | |
| Internet para Todos | A program to increase internet coverage, part of the Secretariat of Welfare | |
| Jóvenes Construyendo el Futuro | A job training program | |
| Justicia en Pasta de Conchos | A plea for justice for the Pasta de Conchos mine disaster | Formerly Cerrada Jacarandas |
| La Escuela Es Nuestra | A program that allows school communities to decide how to use their resources | |
| Madres Trabajadoras | A support program for working mothers | |
| Mejoramiento Urbano | An urban improvement program | |
| Mexicana de Aviación | The Mexicana de Aviación brand which the government acquired from the defunct brand | |
| Avenida Moneda | | Unchanged |
| Nacional de Reconstrucción | Subsidies for partial or total reconstruction of communities affected by natural disasters | |
| Parque Lago de Texcoco | The Lake Texcoco Ecological Park national park | Formerly Gladiolas |
| Plan de Justicia Yaqui | A plea for justice for the Yaqui people | |
| Pensión Discapacidad | A pension program for people with disabilities aged 0 to 29 | |
| Pensión Mujeres | A pension program for women aged 60 or older | |
| Pensión para Adultos Mayores | A pension program for people aged 65 or older | |
| Precios de Garantía | Base prices for agricultural producers, part of the Secretariat of Agriculture and Rural Development | |
| Presa El Cuchillo | The Presa El Cuchillo dam, in China, Nuevo León | |
| Presa Santa María | The Presa Santa María dam, in El Rosario, Sinaloa | |
| Reforma Judicial | The 2024 judicial reform | |
| Reforma Laboral | The 2019 labor reform | |
| Refinería Olmeca | The Olmeca Refinery in Paraíso, Tabasco | |
| Revolución de las Conciencias | "Revolution of the Consciousness", a phrase used by López Obrador | Formerly Copal |
| Salario Mínimo | López Obrador significantly increased the minimum wage | |
| Sembrando Vida | A reforestation program | |
| Soberanía Energética | "Energy Sovereignty", López Obrador's call for Mexico to be self-sufficient in its energy supply | Formerly Pirules |
| Súper Farmacia | A mega pharmacy that stores medications in Huehuetoca, State of Mexico | |
| Tandas para el Bienestar | A tanda is an informal loan club; part of the Secretariat of Welfare | Formerly Rosal |
| Tianguis para el Bienestar | Distribution of confiscated fabrics and household goods, part of the Secretariat of Welfare | Formerly Orquídeas |
| Tren Maya | The Mayan Train in the Yucatán Peninsula | |
| Tren Suburbano | The Tren Interurbano's extension connecting Felipe Ángeles International Airport with Mexico City | |
| Turismo Comunitario | A community program supported by the Secretariat of Tourism | |
| Zonas Arqueológicas | Archaeology of Mexico | |

=== Reactions ===
Municipal president Ana María Castro Fernández stated that the name change provided residents with "legal identity", adding that "it would be more shameful to live on a street named after Gustavo Díaz Ordaz, a murderer of the 1968 student movement", referring to the Tlatelolco massacre. Former municipal president Elena García Martínez, in an interview with Leonardo Curzio of Radio Fórmula, explained that the name change was intended to support the regularization of properties and that the selection of names was made by the state's Urban Development Secretariat. She added that she did not view the change as problematic, asserting that the municipality had the authority to implement it, and that if the majority of residents had been opposed, Morena would not have been the most-voted option in that area.

Claudia Sheinbaum, López Obrador's successor, commented that the decision was made at the municipal level. Residents expressed dissatisfaction, noting that they were not consulted and were required to update their address on several official documents. Some also voiced concerns that their children might face bullying at school due to living in a neighborhood with politically charged names. The National Electoral Institute reported that address changes for voter identification cards cannot be processed until October 2025, due to mapping adjustments ahead of the 2025 judicial elections.

López Obrador had previously commented, including when a statue was erected in his honor, that he did not want streets, neighborhoods, statues, or monuments dedicated to honor his legacy believing that it was no longer time for personality cults.

=== Request for consultation, protests and legal issues ===
On 8 January 2025, the residents removed the street signs, stating that they had not been consulted about the name changes. Only the street signs for Moneda and De las Flores remained in place. They also reported that when attempting to pay for services such as water and property taxes, they were asked to change their addresses to proceed. Police officers tried to stop the removals using tear gas, but the neighbors repelled them by throwing stones. Later, they blocked the Vía José López Portillo and threatened to close the Federal Highway 57.

Following discussions between residents and state authorities, an agreement was reached to temporarily suspend the change of nomenclature, accept tax payments without requiring a change of address, and submit the issue to a popular consultation. On 12 January, the neighbors held an assembly where they voted by a show of hands against renaming the neighborhood. However, days later, Castro Fernández both the idea of holding a consultation and the possibility of reverting the updated names. The municipal government also announced that would press charges for potential crimes including damage, invasion, and assault, charges related to the removal of the street signs, the alleged assault of municipal police officers, and alleged squatting of municipal land.

On 20 January, a judge granted a writ of amparo to halt any changes to the street names temporarily. The following day, residents protested outside the state government palace in Toluca, bringing the removed signs with them. As part of their protest, residents also composed a corrido—a traditional folk song—to voice their opposition.

In March 2026, residents protested by symbolically renaming it Colonia Transformación de Cuarta (English: Fourth-class Transformation), and installing street signs referencing political controversies associated with Morena, including "Narcoestado" (Narco-state), "Desfalco Segalmex" (Segalmex scandal), "Huachicol Fiscal" (a fuel-tax fraud), or "Cártel de la Barredora" (La Barredora Cartel).
