= Phaeax =

Phaeax may refer to:

- Phaeax (architect), 5th century BC
- Phaeax (orator), 5th century BC
- Phaeax (mythology), son of Poseidon and Korkyra

== See also ==
- Phaeax II a cargo ship built as SS Green Hill Park
