= New International Airport for Mexico City =

New International Airport for Mexico City may refer to:

- Mexico City Santa Lucía Airport, current planned new airport
- Mexico City Texcoco Airport, the partially built new airport cancelled in 2018
