= Drainage tunnel =

Tunnel or channel created to drain water

A drainage tunnel, called an emissary in ancient contexts, is a tunnel or channel created to drain water, often from a stagnant or variable-depth body of water. It typically leads to a lower stream or river, or to a location where a pumping station can be economically run. Drainage tunnels have frequently been constructed to drain mining districts or to serve drainage districts.

== Etymology ==
Emissary comes from Latin emissarium, from ex and mittere 'to send out'.

== Ancient world ==
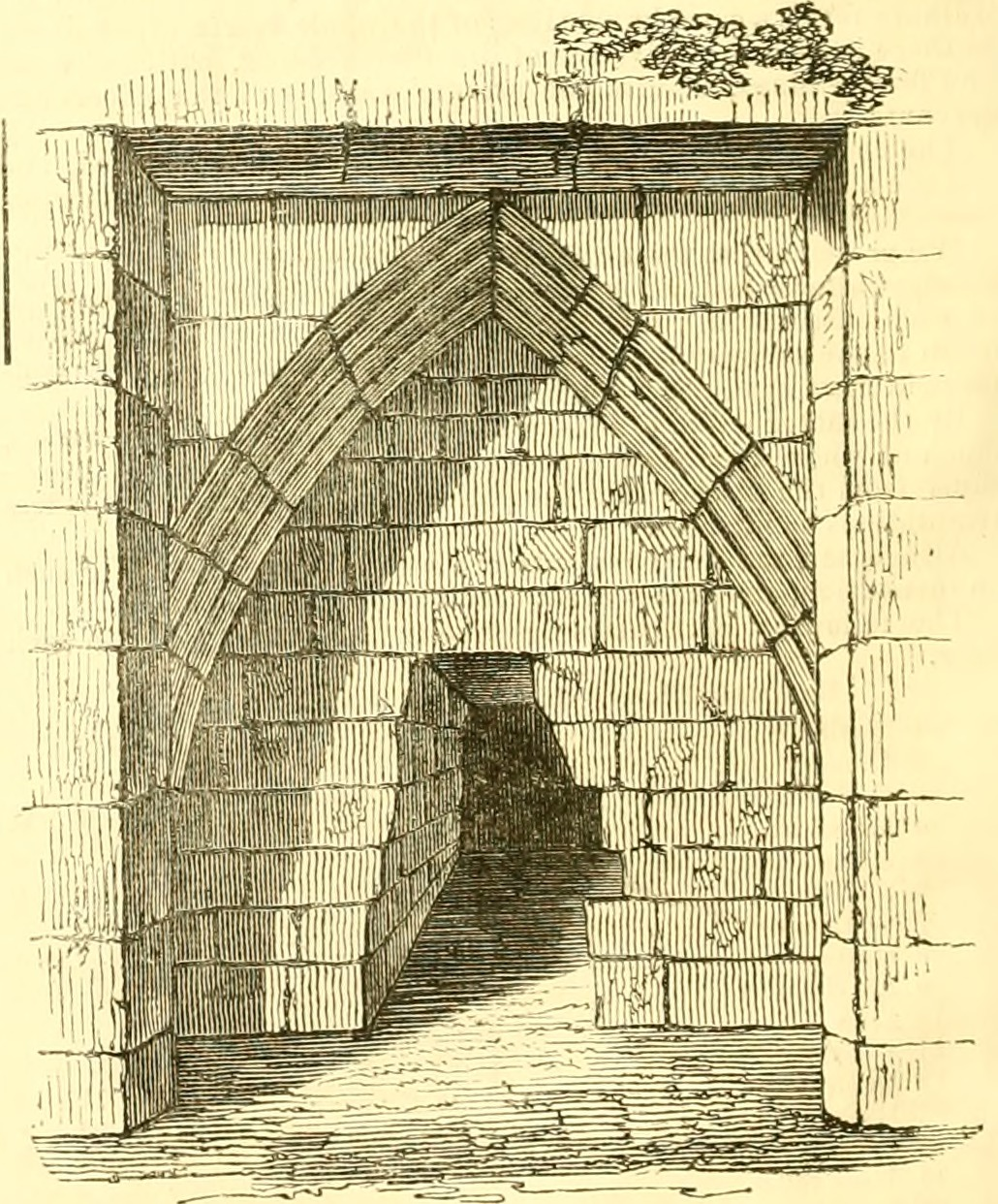
An Etruscan emissary

In ancient Greece, the waters of Lake Copais were drained into the Cephisus; they were partly natural and partly artificial. In 480 BC, Phaeax built drains at Agrigentum in Sicily: they were admired for their sheer size, although the workmanship was crude.

The ancient Romans excelled in the construction of emissaries, as in all their hydraulic works, and remains are extant showing that lakes Trasimeno, Albano and Nemi were all drained by means of emissaries. The case of Lake Fucino is remarkable in two ways: the attempt to drain it was one of the rare failures of Roman engineering, and the emissary is now completely above ground and open to inspection. Julius Caesar is said to have first conceived the idea of this stupendous undertaking (Suet. Jul. 44). Claudius inaugurated what was to have been a complete drainage scheme, the Tunnels of Claudius (Tac. Ann. xii.57), but the water level dropped by just 4 meters and stabilized, leaving the lake very much there. Hadrian tried it again, but failed; and it was not until 1878 that Lake Fucino was finally drained.

The initial text of this section was an abridgement from Smith's Dictionary of Greek and Roman Antiquities (1875 edition, public domain).

== Modern examples ==
Modern examples of drainage tunnels include the Emisor Oriente Tunnel near Mexico City, as well as the Tunnel and Reservoir Plan in Chicago.

== See also ==
- Storm drain
