= Paleontological Museum in Tocuila =

Fossil museum in Tocuila, Mexico

Coordinates: 19°31′13.00″N 98°54′28.04″W

The Paleontological Museum in Tocuila (Museo Paleontológico en Tocuila) is a fossil museum located in Municipality of Texcoco, State of Mexico, central Mexico.

It displays part of one of the richest deposits of Late Pleistocene fauna in America. International groups of archeologists discovered a large quantity of bones, mainly mammoth remains, estimated to be 11,000 to 12,000 years old, in an ancient river mouth that used to flow into the Lake Texcoco.

== Location ==
The Paleontological Museum in Tocuila is located on the street 16 de Septiembre, between streets Morelos and Benito Juárez, in the community of San Miguel Tocuila near Texcoco.

== History ==
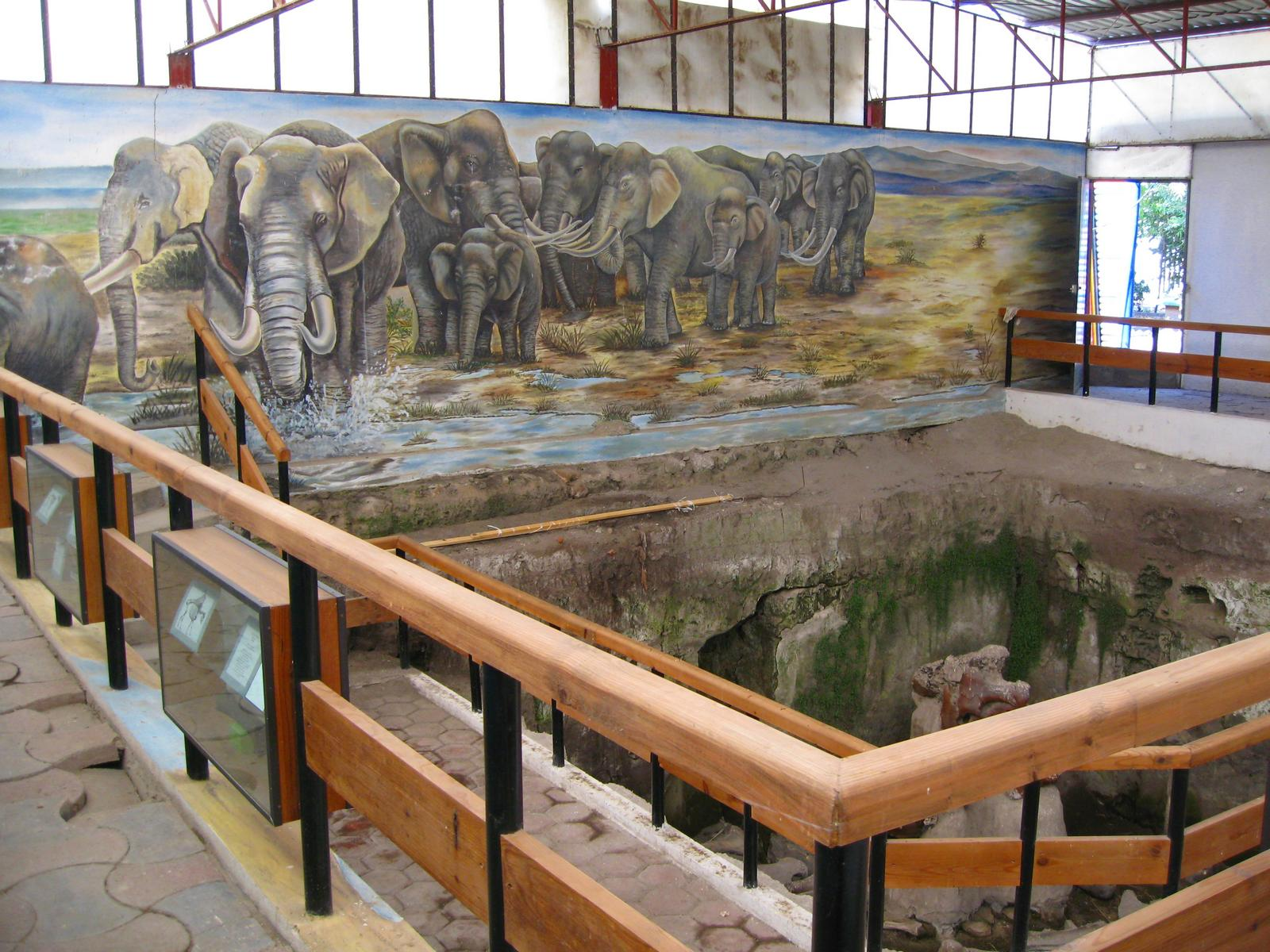
Discovery site.

The discovery of the site happened by chance in 1996. While Joaquín Ramírez was overseeing the excavation and construction of a cistern in the property of his brother Celso, he noticed that the dirt being removed was different from what he usually would find when digging in that area. Supposing it had to be bones, he informed his brother, who in turn, notified the Instituto Nacional de Antropología e Historia (INAH; National Institute of Anthropology and History). Since then many studies have been conducted in order to explain the large concentration of bones in the area.

The Paleontological Museum in Tocuila was opened in November 2001, with the support of the property owners, the community, the University of Chapingo and the INAH.

== Description of the Site ==
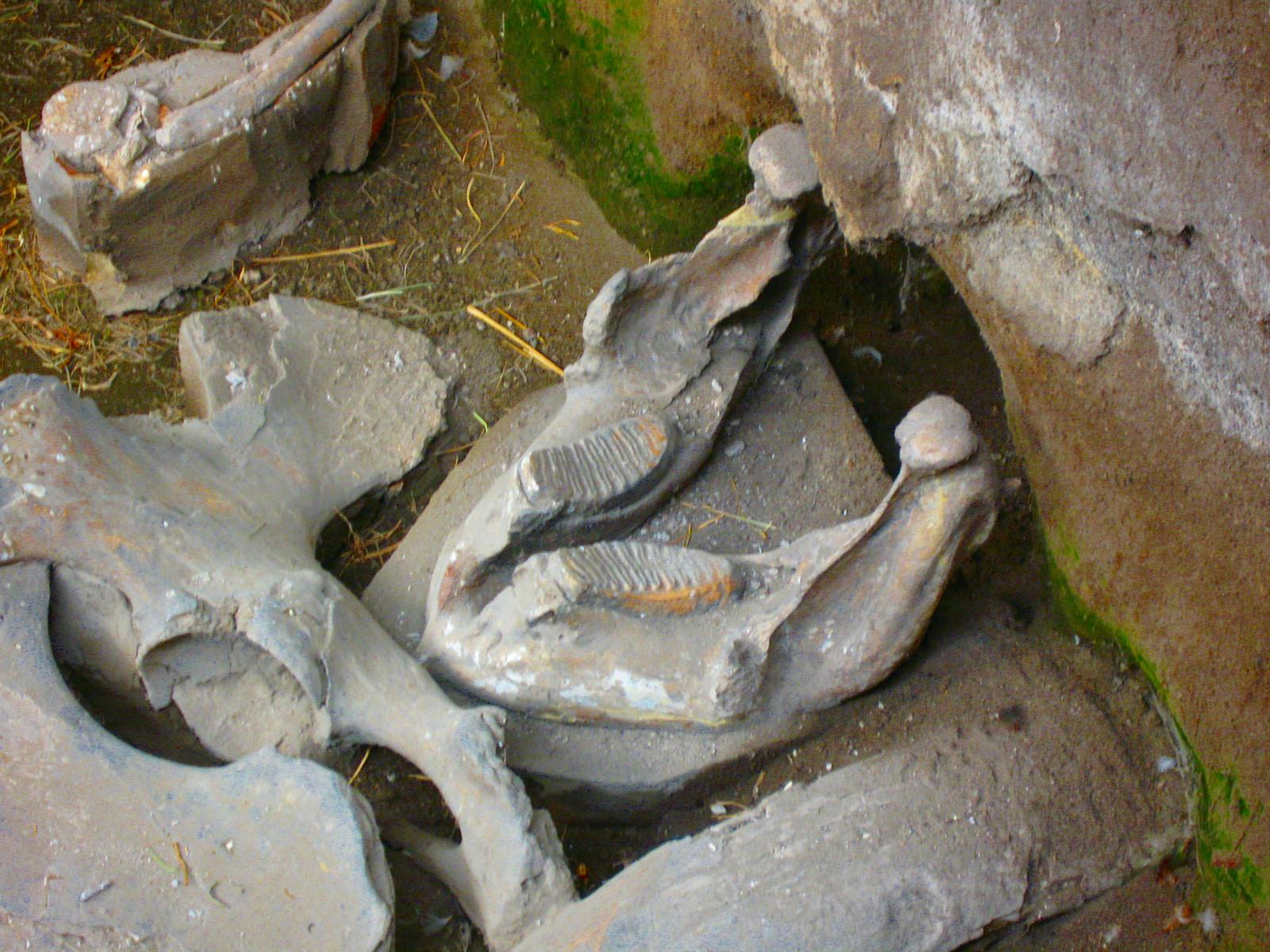
Mammoth jaw.

In the 28 square meters that have been explored, at a depth of three meters, the remains of seven mammoths were found together along with bones of ungulates, rabbits and aquatic animals. The results of most of the studies of the remains indicate an age of 10,000 to 12,000 years.

== Hypotheses ==
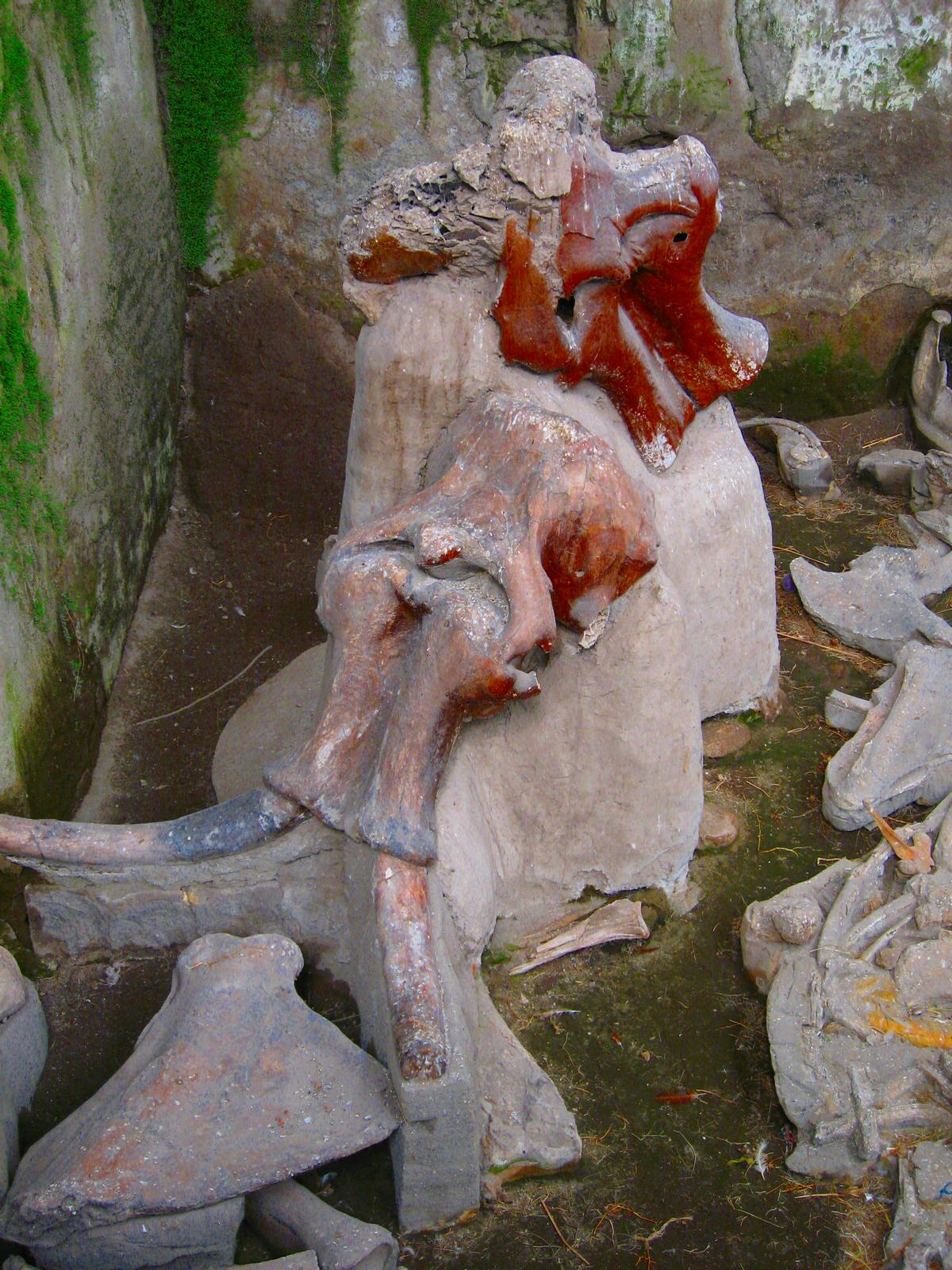
Mammoth skull.

The mode of accumulation of the remains is still uncertain. Nevertheless, there are several hypotheses that try to explain it. The first studies discussed the possibility that the mammoths were trapped by the flow of an ancient river, or a mudflow (Lahar). Claus Siebe, Peter Schaaf and Jaime Urrutia-Fucugauchi propose the lahar originated from the Popocatépetl volcano, while the research of S. Gonzalez, D. Huddart, L. Morett-Alatorre, J. Arroyo-Cabrales and O.J. Polaco presents prove that the lahar was caused by the Nevado de Toluca.

J. Arroyo-Cabrales, E. Johnson and L. Morett analyzed the fractured bones found in the area, and concluded there was human activity engaged in bone quarrying efforts to produce cores and flakes for future use, similar to the bone technology also seen in North America in the Late Pleistocene to manufacture tools.

== See also ==
- Pleistocene animals of North America
