= San Salvador Atenco =

(San Salvador) Atenco
- Town & Municipality
- Interactive map of (San Salvador) Atenco
- Coordinates: 19°33′30″N 98°54′45″W
- Country: Mexico
- State: State of Mexico
- Founded: 968 BC
- Municipal Status: after 1820

Government
  - Municipal President: Mario Ayala Pineda (2009-2012)

Area
  - Municipality: 84.9 km^{2} (32.8 sq mi)
- Elevation (of seat): 2,250 m (7,380 ft)

Population (2005) Municipality
  - Municipality: 42,739
  - Seat: 14,995
- Time zone: UTC-6 (CST)
- Postal code (of seat): 56300

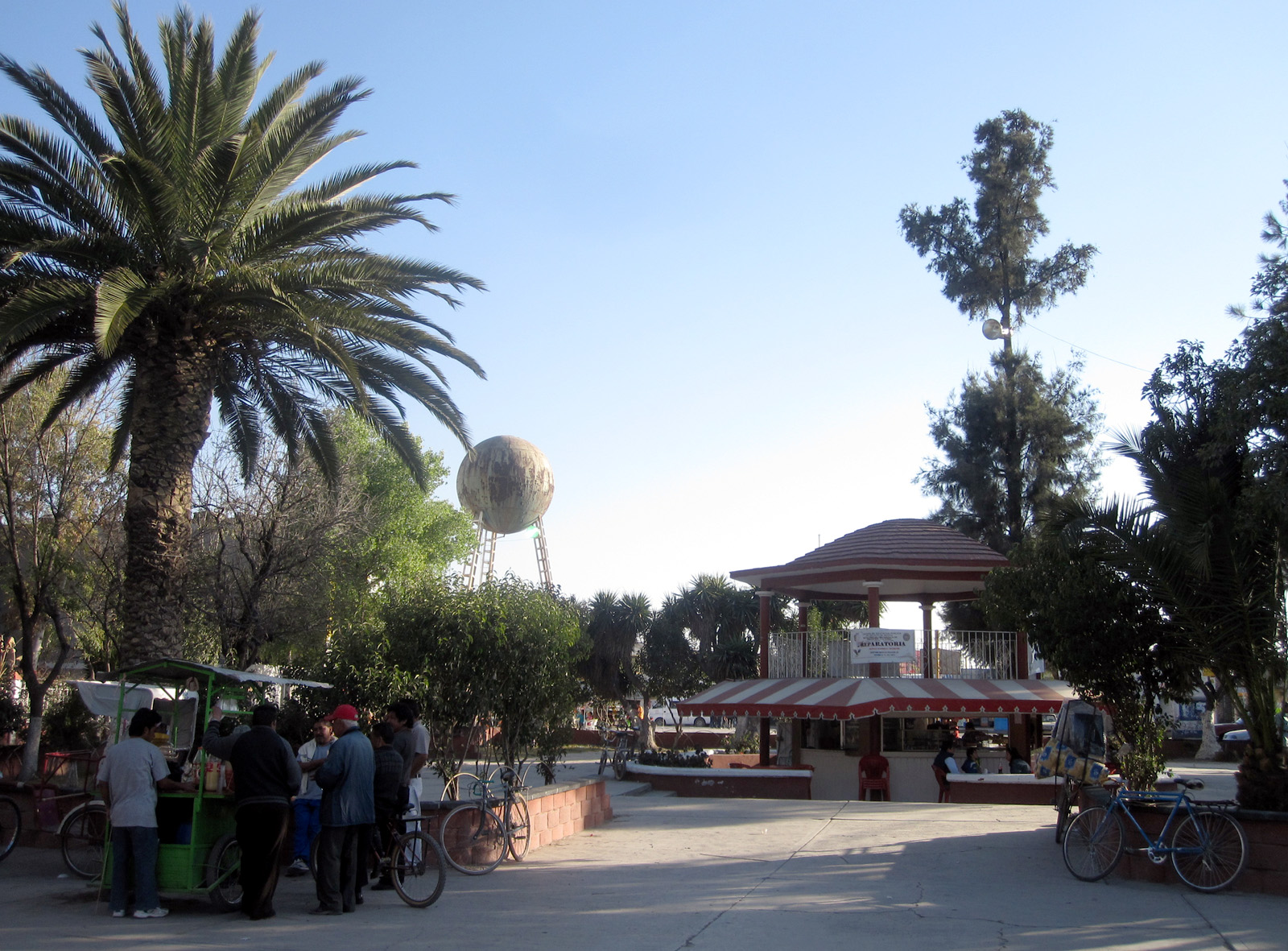
Downtown of San Salvador de Atenco

San Salvador Atenco is the municipal seat of Atenco, in the Mexican state of Mexico. The name "Atenco" comes from a Nahuatl phrase meaning "place on the edge of water".

== The town ==
Fifteen excavations have been done in this area, uncovering mammoth bones, stone tools and other artifacts showing human habitation from at least 7000 B.C.

According to some traditions in the historico-mythical accounts of the 16th century Nahuas, early Nahuatl-speaking groups ("pre-Aztecs", called also Chichimeca) invaded the area from the north around 968 BC. There was supposedly an intermarriage with the last Toltec king Topiltzin. From this lineage came the king Nezahualcóyotl, one of the three founders of the Aztec Triple Alliance. Atenco became subject to Texcoco in 1428.

After the fall of Tenochtitlán to the Spaniards under Hernán Cortés, the Aztecs of this area continued to fight against the Spanish conquest, supporting the lord of Texcoco. However, this area fell to the Spaniards in 1521. After this the Spaniards imposed a tribute system and Spanish law onto the land and built the Chapel of Cristo de Esquipulas in 1571.

This chapel was built by the Franciscans for the purpose of evangelization. It is constructed of stone and "tezontle" (porous volcanic rock). Its gilded retablo is the original built with the chapel with its saint's day celebrated the second Monday after Carnaval.

San Salvador Atenco received wide media coverage both in 2002 and 2006, when it was the site of violent mass protests against the federal and local governments. The 2002 protests were against the planned construction of a new international airport for Mexico City. The construction of the airport was cancelled.

In 2006, violent clashes followed the expulsion of eight downtown flower vendors by the police. The latter confrontation marked the beginning of the 2006 Atenco Riots, which lasted over a week and resulted in over 100 arrests and numerous allegations of human rights abuses committed by the police against the local population, including the detention of forty women, eleven of whom claimed they were sexually assaulted while in detention and who subsequently brought a case before the Inter-American Commission on Human Rights, alleging, in part, that the abuses were the result of a crackdown ordered by Mexican President Enrique Peña Nieto, who at the time was governor of the state of Mexico. In September 2016, the Commission upheld the women's claim.

== The municipality of Atenco ==
As municipal seat San Salvador Atenco has governing jurisdiction over the following communities:

Chileleco (Ampliación Nexquipayac Chileleco), Colonia el Salado, Ejido San Salvador Acuexcomac (Ejido la Purísima), Ejido de San Cristóbal Nexquipayac, El Amanal, Granjas Ampliación Santa Rosa, Hacienda la Grande Fracción Uno, La Pastoría, Los Hornos (El Presidio), Nueva Santa Rosa, San Cristóbal Nexquipayac, San Miguel Arcángel (Tepetzingo), Santa Isabel Ixtapan, and Zapotlán.

The municipality borders the municipalities of Acolman, Tezoyuca, Texcoco, Chiautla, Chiconcuac and Ecatepec with a total area of 94.67 km2. This territory lies on the Neovolcanic Axis that crosses Mexico. Even though the only elevations are in the south of the municipality (Huatepec and Tepetzingo hills), there is volcanic activity underground, under what was Lake Texcoco.

Most of the economic activity of the municipality is based on subsistence farming with a large percentage of its inhabitants owning farmland. Very little of the food grown is sold in markets.
