= Molino de Flores Nezahualcóyotl National Park =

National park in Mexico

Coordinates: 19.514°N 98.839°W

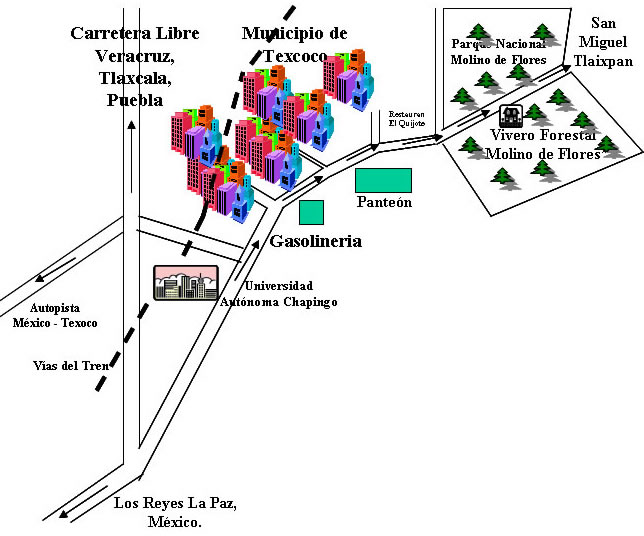
Map to Molino de Flores Nezahualcóyotl National Park, near Texcoco.

Molino de Flores Nezahualcóyotl National Park, located in the Municipality of Texcoco, the State of Mexico, Mexico.

== History ==
Site of the former Hacienda Molino de Flores, which produced pulque and grains. Most of the buildings on the site, including the main residence, the Church of San Joaquin, and the Chapel of Señor de la Presa (Lord of the Dam), were constructed by Miguel de Cervantes and his wife.

According to tradition, the chapel was named for an apparition of Christ which supposedly occurred on the rocks that border the Cuxcahuaco which crosses this property. The chapel is built out of the rockface, much like the temple at Malinalco.

The hacienda reached its peak in the late 19th and early 20th century. After the Mexican Revolution, it was abandoned and it deteriorated. The hacienda was declared a national park by President Lázaro Cárdenas in 1937. Due to its style and condition, the hacienda has been used as a set for numerous Mexican and foreign films.
