= Community Front in Defense of Land =

The Community Front in Defense of Land (in Spanish: Frente del Pueblo en Defensa de La Tierra, FPDT) was formed in 2002, by residents of San Salvador Atenco, to resist their forced displacement by the government of Mexico. The government planned to displace them to make way for a new Mexico City international airport. The people of San Salvador Atenco have risen up against the government from time to time for various reasons, the most common being disputes for land.

The FPDT is known to be allied with the Zapatista Army of National Liberation (EZLN) and with groups such as the FPFV (Francisco Villa Popular Front), through the program called The Other Campaign.

== See also ==
- 2006 civil unrest in San Salvador Atenco
