= Lake Texcoco =

Former lake in Valley of Mexico

- Lago de Texcoco; Tetzco(h)co

- Location within Mexico Location within North America
- Interactive map of Lake Texcoco
- Location: Central Mexico
- Coordinates: 19°25′10″N 99°08′00″W
- Type: Former pluvial and paleo salt lake, endorheic
- Surface area: 5,400 square kilometres (2,100 sq mi)
- Max. depth: over 150 metres (490 ft)
- Surface elevation: 2,240 metres (7,350 ft)

Ramsar Wetland
- Official name: Lago de Texcoco
- Designated: 5 June 2022
- Reference no.: 2469

Lake Texcoco (Spanish: Lago de Texcoco; Nahuatl languages: Tetzco(h)co) was a natural saline lake within the Anahuac or Valley of Mexico. Lake Texcoco is best known for an island situated on the western side of the lake where the Mexica built the city of Mēxihco Tenōchtitlan, which would later become the capital of the Aztec Empire. After the Spanish conquest, efforts to control flooding led to most of the lake being drained.

The entire lake basin is now almost completely occupied by Mexico City, the capital of the present-day country of Mexico. Drainage of the lake has led to serious ecological and human consequences. The local climate and water availability have changed considerably, contributing to water scarcity in the area; subsequent groundwater extraction leads to land subsidence under much of the city. Native species endemic to the lake region, such as the axolotl, have become severely endangered or extinct due to ecosystem change.

== Geography ==
The Valley of Mexico is a large natural basin located in the southern highlands of Mexico's central altiplano, with an average elevation of 2,236 m (7,336 ft) above mean sea level. Lake Texcoco formerly extended over a large portion of the southern half of this basin, where it was the largest of an interconnected chain of five major and several smaller lakes (the other major lakes being Lakes Xaltocan, Zumpango, Chalco, and Xochimilco). Much of the lake was fed by groundwater aquifers; freshwater poured in from Lake Chalco and Xochimilco's freshwater springs, while the thermal springs of Zumpango and Xaltocan, as well as some in Texcoco itself, provided saline water. During periods of high water levels—typically after the May-to-October rainy seasons—the lakes were often joined as one body of water, at an average elevation of 2,242 m (7,356 ft) above mean sea level. In the drier winter months the lake system tended to separate into individual bodies of water, a flow that was mitigated by the construction of dikes and causeways in the Late Postclassic period (1200–1521 CE) of Mesoamerican chronology. Lake Texcoco was the lowest-lying of all the lakes, and occupied the minimum elevation in the valley so that water ultimately drained towards it. The Valley of Mexico is a closed or endorheic basin. Because there is no outflow, evapotranspiration is estimated to be 72–79% of precipitation.

== History ==
Between the Pleistocene epoch and the last glacial period, the lake occupied the entire Mexico Valley. Lake Texcoco reached its maximum extent 11,000 years ago with a size of about 2,189 square miles (5,670 km^{2}) and over 500 feet (150 m) deep. When the lake's water level fell, it created several paleo-lakes that would connect with each other from time to time. In the north, in the modern community of San Miguel Tocuilla, there is an important paleontological field where many fossilized Pleistocene fauna have been discovered. The lake was primarily fed by snowmelt from nearby mountain glaciers when the Mexico Valley had a temperate climate. Between 11,000 and 6,000 years ago, the climate naturally warmed and snowfall in central Mexico became less prevalent. This caused the water level of the lake to drop over the next several millennia. Remnants of the ancient shoreline that Lake Texcoco had from the last glacial period can be seen on some slopes of Mount Tlaloc as well as mountains west of Mexico City. The disarticulated remains of seven Columbian mammoths dated between 10,220 ± 75 and 12,615 ± 95 years (BP) were found, suggesting human presence. It is believed that the lake may have disappeared and subsequently re-formed at least 10 times in the last 30,000 years.

Agriculture around the lake began about 7,000 years ago, with humans following the patterns of periodic inundations of the lake. Several villages appeared on the northeast side of the lake between 1700 and 1250 BC. By 1250 BC, the identifying signs of the Tlatilco culture, including more complex settlements and a stratified social structure, are seen around the lake. By roughly 800 BC, Cuicuilco had eclipsed the Tlatilco cultural centers and was the major power in the Valley of Mexico during the next 200 years when its famous conical pyramid was built. The Xitle volcano destroyed Cuicuilco around AD 30, a destruction that may have contributed to the rise of Teotihuacan.

After the fall of Teotihuacan, AD 600–800, several other city-states appeared around the lake, including Xoloc, Azcapotzalco, Tlacopan, Coyohuacan, Culhuacán, Chimalpa, and Chimalhuacán – mainly from Toltec and Chichimeca influence. None of these predominated and they coexisted more or less in peace for several centuries. This time was described as a Golden Age in Aztec chronicles. By the year 1300, however, the Tepanec from Azcapotzalco were beginning to dominate the area.

=== Tenochtitlan ===
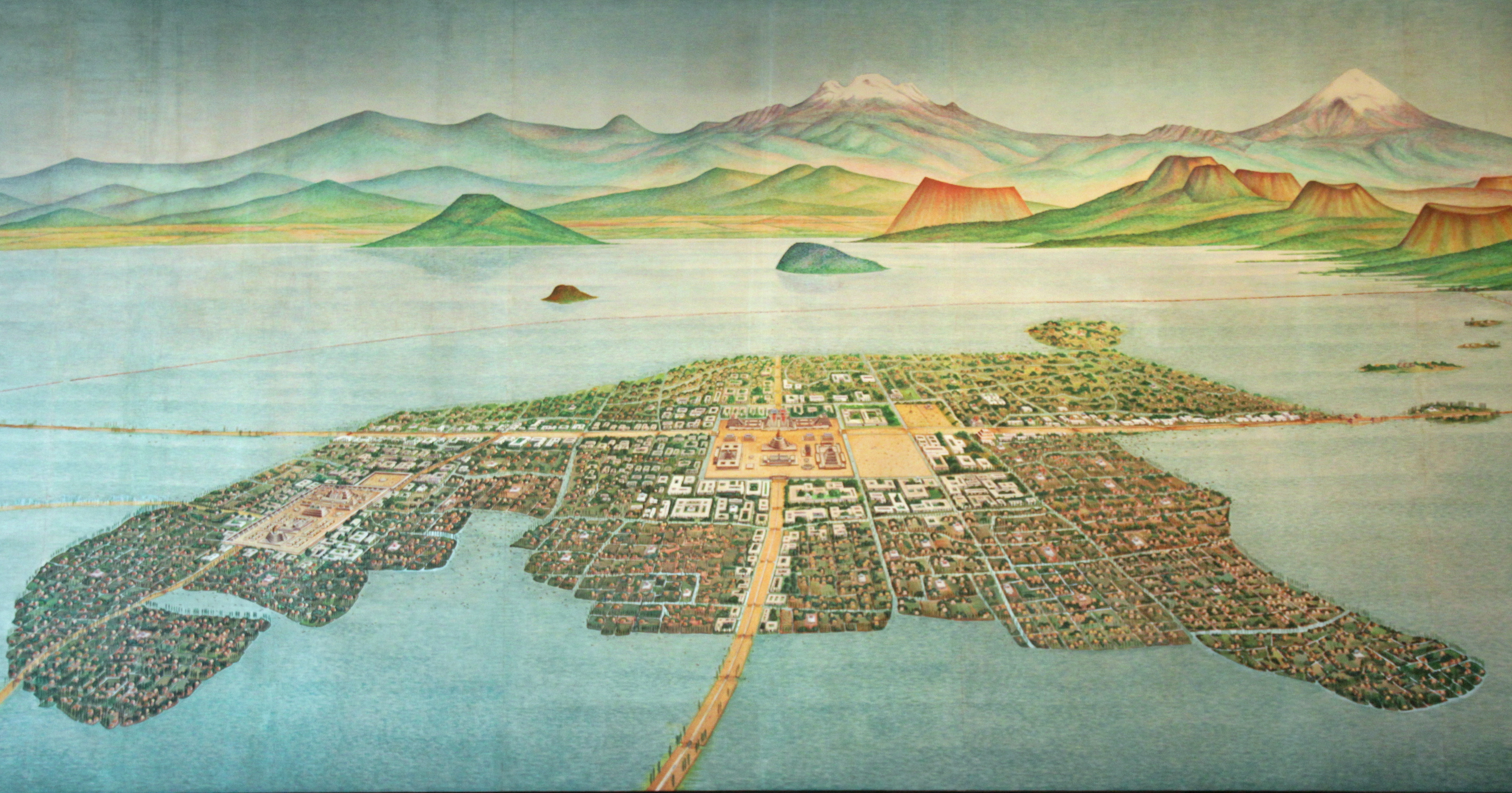
Tenochtitlan and Lake Texcoco in 1519

According to a traditional story, the Mexica wandered in the deserts of modern Mexico for 100 years before they came to the thick forests of the place now called the Valley of Mexico.

Tenochtitlan was founded on an islet in the western part of the lake in the year 1325. Around it, the Aztecs created a large artificial island using a system similar to the creation of chinampas. To overcome the problems of drinking water, the Aztecs built a system of dams to separate the salty waters of the lake from the rain water of the effluents. It also permitted them to control the level of the lake. The city also had an inner system of channels that helped to control the water.

The Aztec ruler Ahuitzotl attempted to build an aqueduct that would take fresh water from the mainland to the lakes surrounding Tenochtitlan. The aqueduct failed, and the city suffered a major flood in 1502.

During Hernán Cortés's siege of Tenochtitlan in 1521, the dams were destroyed and never rebuilt, so flooding became a big problem for the new Mexico City built over Tenochtitlan.

=== Artificial drainage ===
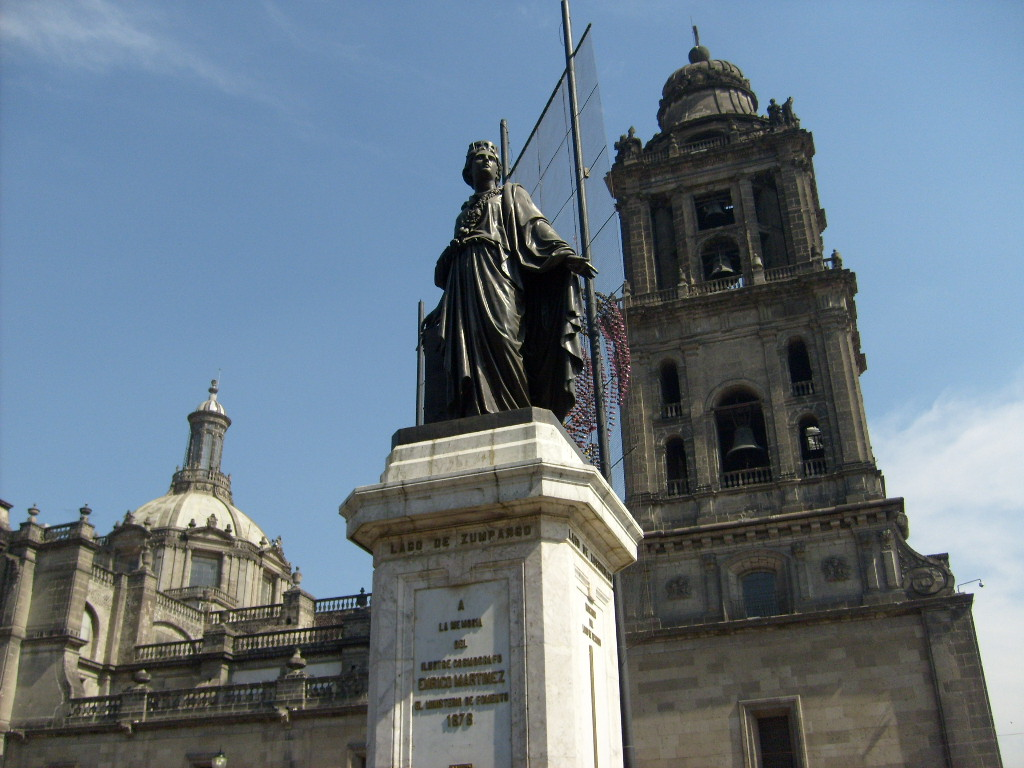
Monument to Enrico Martinez in Mexico City

Mexico City suffered from periodic floods; in 1604 the lake flooded the city, with an even more severe flood following in 1607. Under the direction of Enrico Martínez, a drain was built to control the level of the lake, but in 1629 another flood kept most of the city covered for five years. At that time, it was debated whether to relocate the city, but the Spanish authorities decided to keep the existing location.

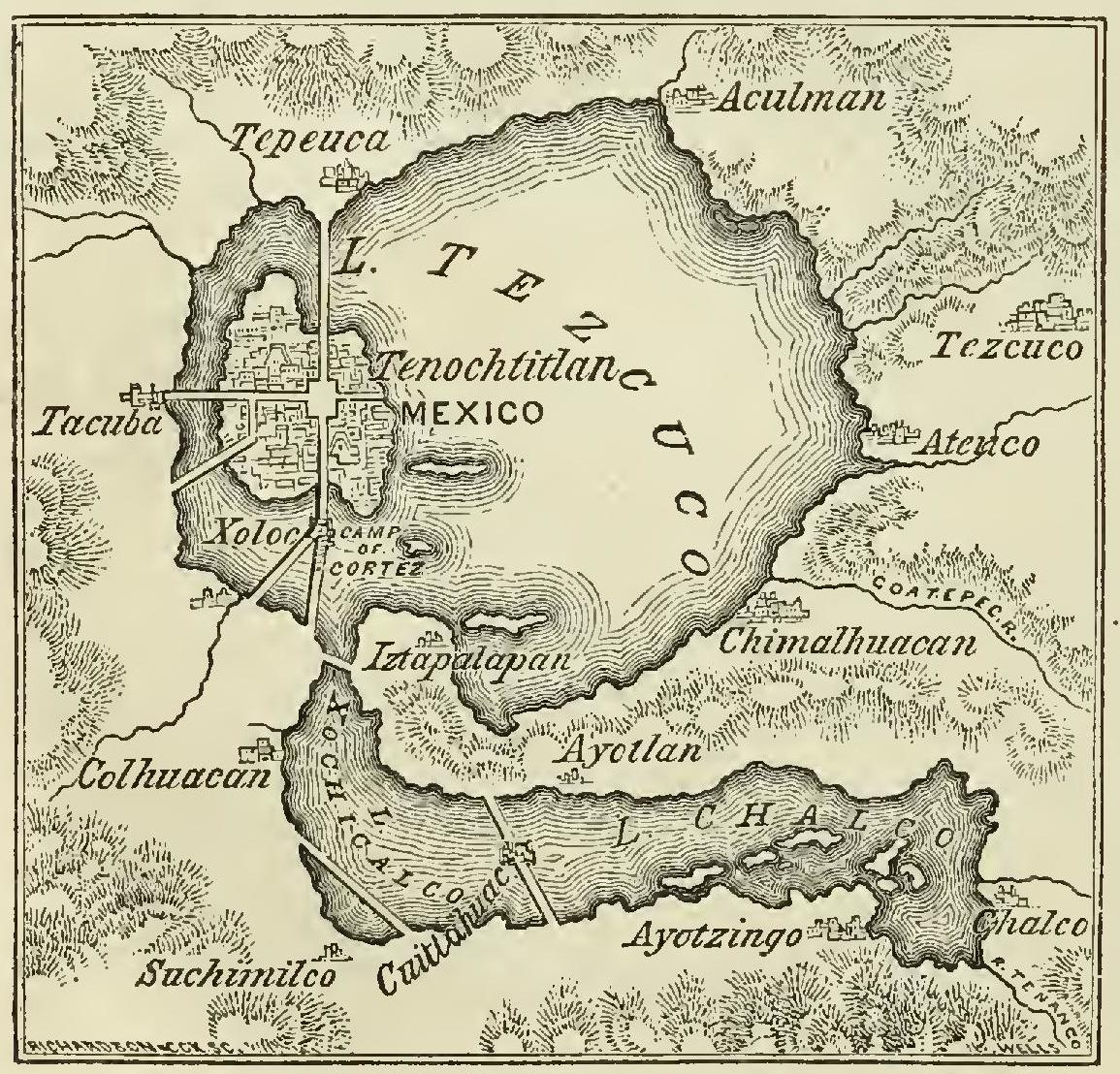
Lake Texcoco map from Harper's New Monthly Magazine, December 1855

Eventually the lake was drained by the channels and a tunnel to the Pánuco River, but even that could not stop floods, since by then most of the city was under the water table. The flooding could not be completely controlled until the twentieth century. In 1967, construction of the Drenaje Profundo ("Deep Drainage System"), a network of several hundred kilometers of tunnels, was completed, at a depth between 30 and 250 m (98 and 820 ft). The central tunnel has a diameter of 6.5 m (21.3 ft) and carries rain water out of the basin. The eastern discharge tunnel was inaugurated in 2019.

The ecological consequences of the draining were enormous. Parts of the valleys were turned semi-arid, and even today Mexico City suffers from lack of water. Due to overdrafting that is depleting the aquifer beneath the city, Mexico City is estimated to have sunk 10 meters (33 feet) in the last century. Furthermore, because soft lake sediments underlie most of Mexico City, the city has proven vulnerable to soil liquefaction during earthquakes, most notably in the 1985 earthquake when hundreds of buildings collapsed and thousands of people died.

The term "Texcoco Lake" now refers only to a big area surrounded by salt marshes 4 km (2.5 mi) east of Mexico City, which covers part of the ancient lake bed. There are also small remnants of the lakes of Xochimilco, Chalco, and Zumpango.

Several species indigenous to the lake are now extinct or endangered (e.g. axolotls).

The modern Texcoco Lake has a high concentration of salts and its waters are evaporated for their processing. A Mexican company, Sosa Texcoco S.A., has an 800-hectare (2,000-acre) solar evaporator known as El Caracol.

Land reclamation of the lakebed was part of Mexico's attempts at development in the twentieth century.

== Restoration and conservation ==
=== Ecological park ===
The Lake Texcoco Ecological Park, officially called Parque Ecológico Lago de Texcoco (PELT), is a national park in the State of Mexico, and a federal government project. It is part of the larger metropolitan area in the Valley of Mexico, around Mexico City.

The planned area for the park is 14,000 ha (35,000 acres), of which 4,800 ha (12,000 acres) will be public spaces. The park was inaugurated by the president of Mexico Andrés Manuel López Obrador on 30 August 2024. The park was designated after the cancellation of an airport in the same location.

The park is both a major ecological restoration project, and a site with great potential for climate adaptation for Mexico City.

=== Wildlife ===
The lake is home to an endemic subspecies of Mexican garter snake called the Lake Chapala Garter Snake, the critically endangered axolotl, and at one point in time the now-extinct slender-billed grackle.

== See also ==
- History of Mexico City
- Paleontological Museum in Tocuila
- List of prehistoric lakes
