= Mining district =

Mining district may refer to:

- Mining district (North America)
- Mining district (Europe)
