= Emisor Oriente Tunnel =

Tunnel in Mexico

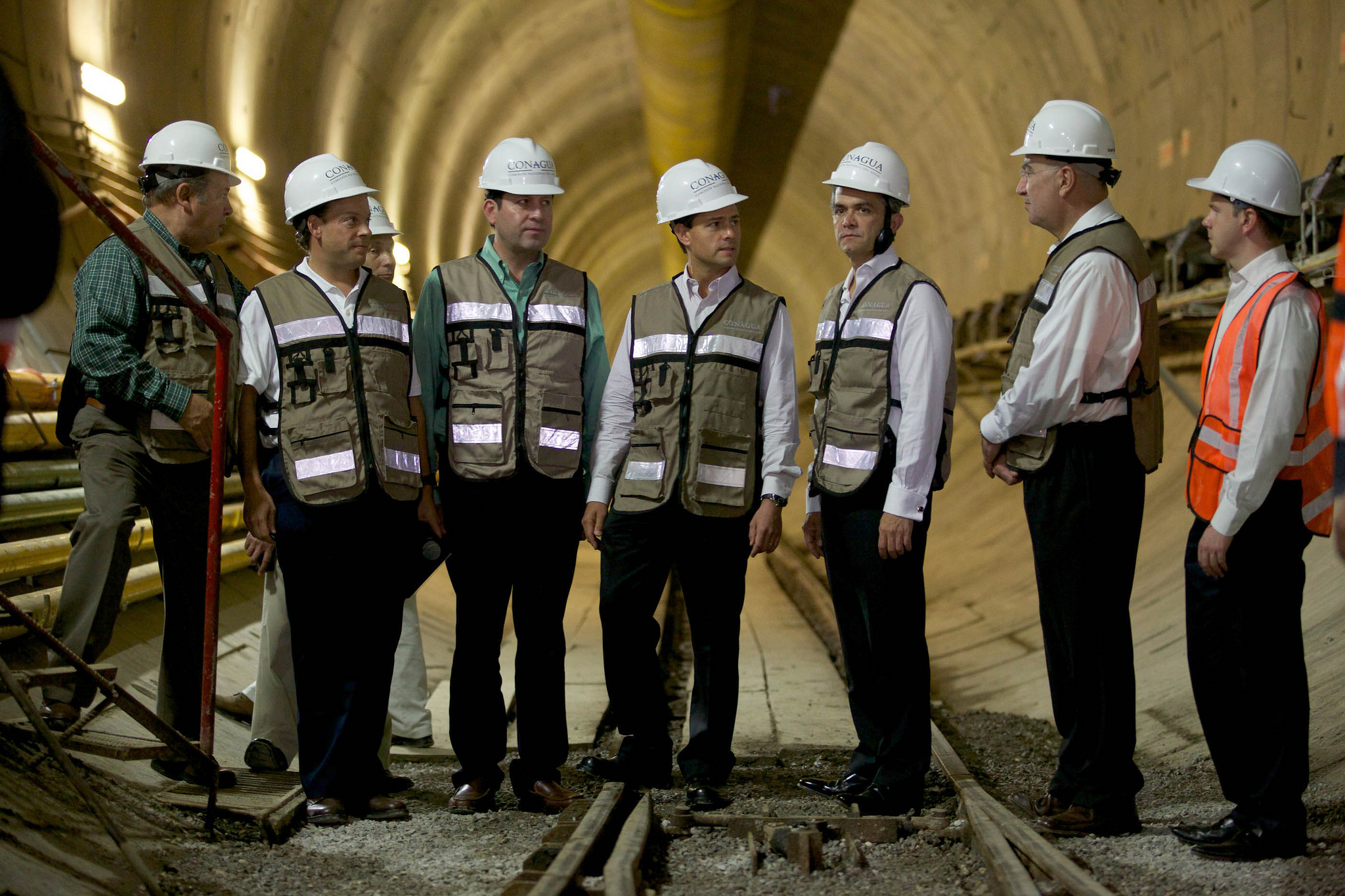
- Enrique Peña Nieto and Miguel Ángel Mancera in the tunnel in 2013
- Interactive map of Emisor Oriente Tunnel

Overview
- Official name: Túnel Emisor Oriente
- Location: Mexico City
- Coordinates: Entrance: 19.503338°N 99.077452°W; Exit: 19.948116°N 99.295649°W
- Start: Mexico City
- End: Atotonilco Wastewater Treatment Plant in Hidalgo state

Technical
- Length: 62,500 m (38.8 mi)
- Min elevation: maximum 200 metres below ground level

The Emisor Oriente Tunnel, also known as the Túnel Emisor Oriente, Eastern Discharge Tunnel, Eastern Wastewater Tunnel, and East Issuing Tunnel, is a wastewater treatment tunnel in Mexico City, Mexico. At 62,500 m (38.8 mi), it is the eighth longest tunnel in the world. It was constructed between 2008 and 2019 using a tunnel boring machine. Serving a population of 20 million, it runs from Mexico City to the Atotonilco Wastewater Treatment Plant in Hidalgo state. It runs at a maximum depth of 200 meters (656 Feet) below ground level and has a discharge capacity of 150 m^{3}/s. This tunnel will help prevent flooding and serves as an alternate exit for the Emisor Central, another drainage tunnel.

In order to prevent collapse, the tunnel is constructed using a lining with segmental rings made of concrete and steel.

The estimated cost for the tunnel was 15 billion pesos (equivalent to $780 million in 2008). After completion, the tunnel was realized to have gone over budget and cost 30 billion pesos (equivalent to $1.6 billion in 2019).
