= Lake Texcoco Ecological Park =

Planned urban park in Mexico City

Coordinates: 19.50°N 98.99°W

The Lake Texcoco Ecological Park, officially called Parque Ecológico Lago de Texcoco (PELT), is a national park in the State of Mexico, and a federal government project. It is part of the larger metropolitan area in the Valley of Mexico, around Mexico City.

The planned area for the park is 14,000 ha (35,000 acres), of which 4,800 ha (12,000 acres) will be public spaces. The park was inaugurated by the president of Mexico Andrés Manuel López Obrador on 30 August 2024. The park was designated after the cancellation of an airport in the same location.

The park is both a major ecological restoration project, and a site with great potential for climate adaptation for Mexico City.

== History ==
Before the arrival of the Spanish in 1519, the indigenous groups of the area were thriving. Specifically in the Valley of Mexico, the Teotihuacan, Toltecs, and Aztecs had risen to power at different points throughout history. In 1519, however, only the Aztecs were still active civilizations. The Aztec empire was conquered by the Spanish in 1521, and the city of Tenochtitlan was rebuilt and named Mexico City.

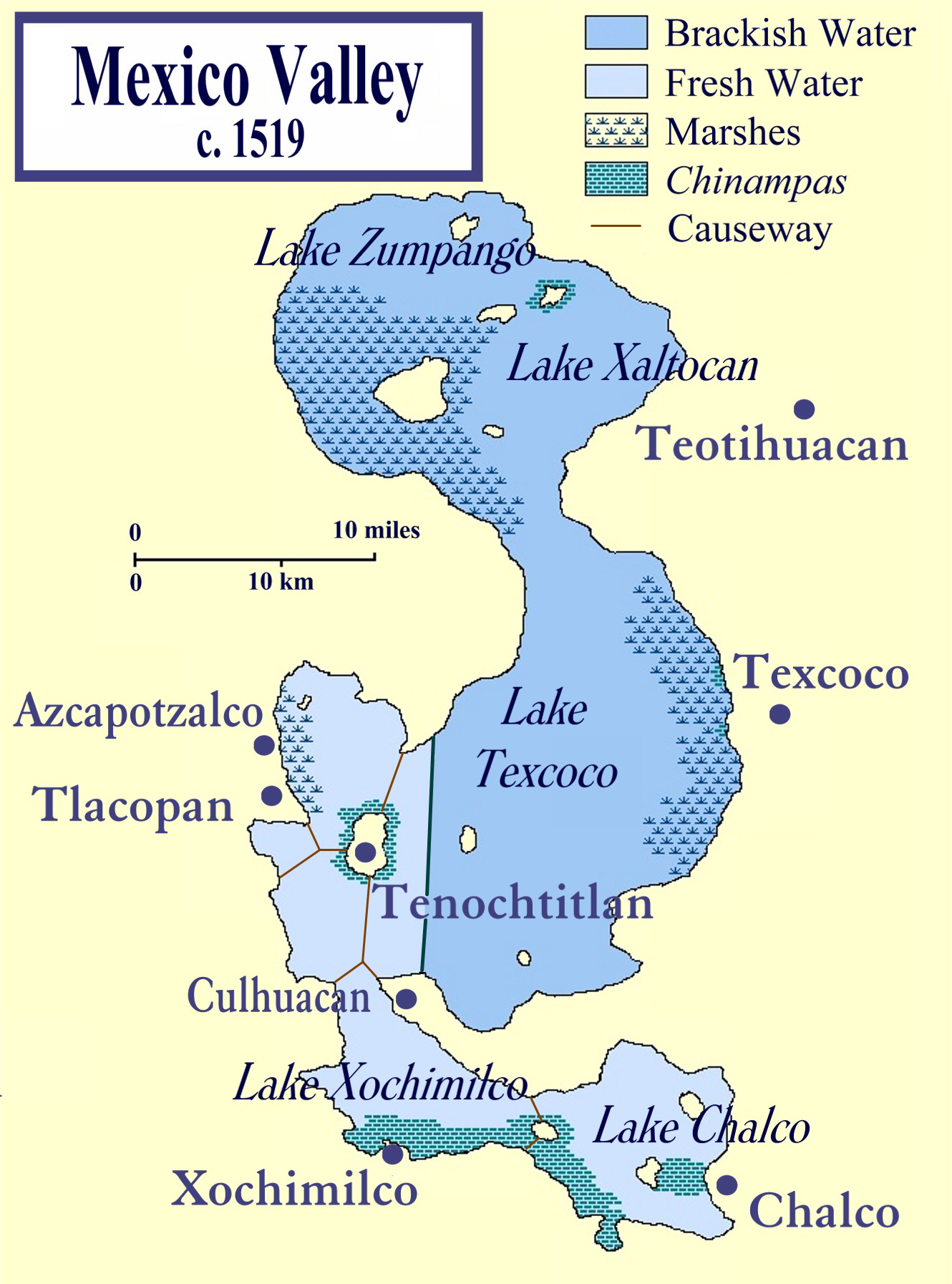
Map of the Valley of Mexico c. 1519

The park occupies land in Mexico City which had previously been part of the Lake of Texcoco. In the Valley of Mexico, the indigenous people altered the landscape around them through the use of technology like dikes to redirect water flow from the lakes that surrounded them. They utilized the flooding for crops and to ensure proper maintenance of the land. When the Spanish colonized the area, they began a massive project to drain the lakes instead of utilizing the benefits of the floods. This project, called the Desagüe (drain), began in 1607, when they officially broke ground.

The Spanish felt that the drainage of the lake was necessary because of the frequent floods that threatened to destroy buildings and the infrastructure that the Spanish had established. Constant maintenance of the project was necessary and in as early as 1629, the system failed and the city flooded. Because of this failure, engineers turned to a trench model instead of tunnels, and the construction lasted for more than 150 years. This project resulted in massive destruction of the land and endangered species that live in the area, such as the axolotl.

There are ongoing issues with obtaining enough drinking water for people who live in Mexico City. This is partially due to the fact that the lakes were drained and the location of the city makes it difficult to funnel in new sources of water. Some of the current issues that the city is facing with regards to water is the management of sewage and the inequality that exists in water distribution. People that live in wealthier areas get access to water first while the rest of Mexico City has to wait to get their water later.

The space had been designated for the construction of the new international airport for Mexico City. There were protests about the airport project, specifically a movement was created called #YoPrefieroElLago (I prefer the lake). This movement was built by local people who wanted to prevent the destruction of the land and ensure that their land was not stripped from them. In October 2018, while construction of the airport 15% completed, a non-binding referendum was organized by then President-elect Andrés Manuel López Obrador, in which almost 70 percent of the 1.067 million voters rejected the planned airport, choosing instead to build a new airport on the grounds of Santa Lucía Air Force Base.

=== Announcement and financing ===
In August 2020, the government announced the project. On 27 August, the Secretariat of Finance and Public Credit (SHCP) announced that the estimated cost was 17.713 billion pesos to be spent over 8 years. In December 2020 the National Water Commission (Comisión Nacional del Agua or CONAGUA), said that it was investing 13 billion pesos into the project.

== Description ==
The park will include multiple natural spaces from the metropolitan area such as the Bosque de Chapultepec. Mexican architect Iñaki Echeverría is in charge of the direction of the parks. The design was in charge of the Master in Architecture Daniel Holguin as well as the Landscape Architect Pedro Camarena Berruecos.

The park will be divided into four parts: Lago Nabor Carrillo, Cruickshank, Xochiaca-Churubusco and Caracol.

=== Planned land use ===
Land use (ha)	Zone I	Zone II	Zone III	Zone IV	Total
Land use (ha)	Nabor Carrillo	Cruickshank	Xochiaca-Churubusco	Caracol	Total
Water body	1 878	1 295	551	922	4 464
Infrastructure	11	32	162	105	309
Roads	18	–	23	–	41
Total	3 149	4 875	2 327	1 873	12 224

The main objective of this project is to reclaim the site for green infrastructure in the valley of Mexico City. Rather than returning the area to an intact ecosystem from before Spanish colonization, the key is to create a complete balance between infrastructure and nature.

The proposed area of the park will be 35,000 acres, constituting reforested areas for hiking and biking, soccer fields, restored wetlands and lakes, and areas for families and picnics. In addition, the park will host renewable energy facilities, community gardens, water treatment facilities and a research center for the study of wetlands.

The project aims to reconcile the city with its geography, incorporating hydrological cycles, eliminating the threat of floods for the metropolitan area of Mexico City, and also contributing to re-establish the native biodiversity. The finished plan will preserve 678 species of native flora and fauna to the Lake Texcoco area, including 5 species of amphibians, 14 species of reptiles, 276 species of birds, and 29 species of mammals. Special attention will be provided to the burrowing owl, the rough-necked alligator lizard, the ridged tree frog, and the mexclapique of the basin of Mexico.

The first phases of the park opened in July 2024.

== See also ==
- Mexico City Texcoco Airport
