= Phaeax (architect) =

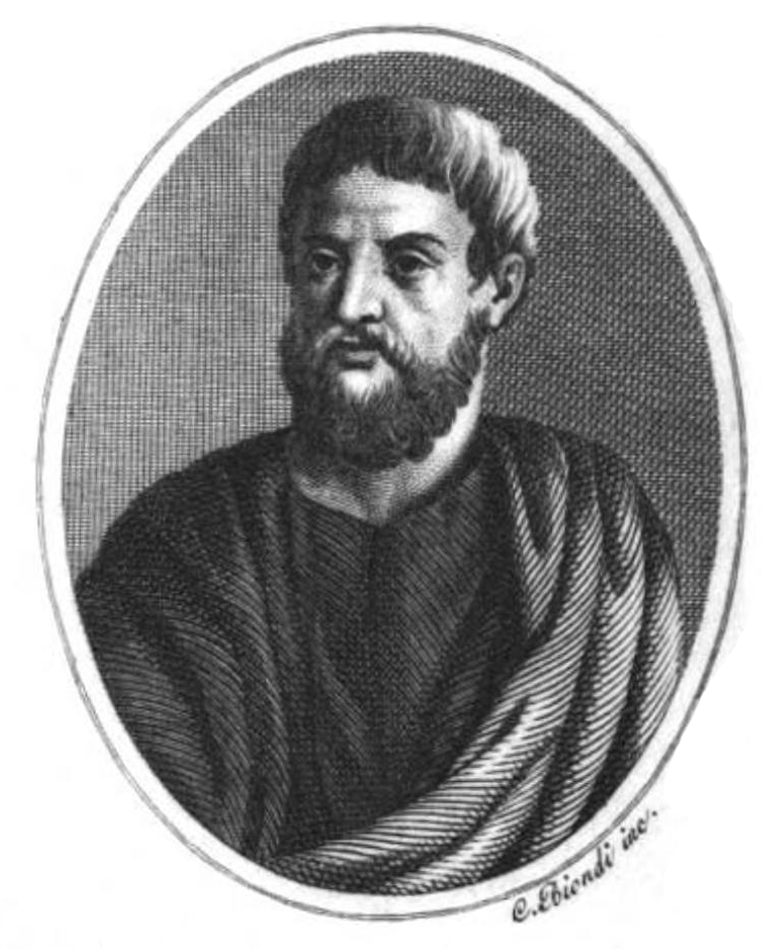
Portrait of Phaeax made in 1818

Phaeax (Greek: Φαίαξ) was a celebrated architect of Akragas in Magna Graecia, who flourished about 480 BC, and executed several important public works for his native city. Among the most remarkable of these works were the sewers, which were named after the architect.
