= Mexico City Texcoco Airport =

Mexico City Texcoco Airport Aeropuerto de Texcoco, formerly Nuevo Aeropuerto Internacional de México (NAIM)
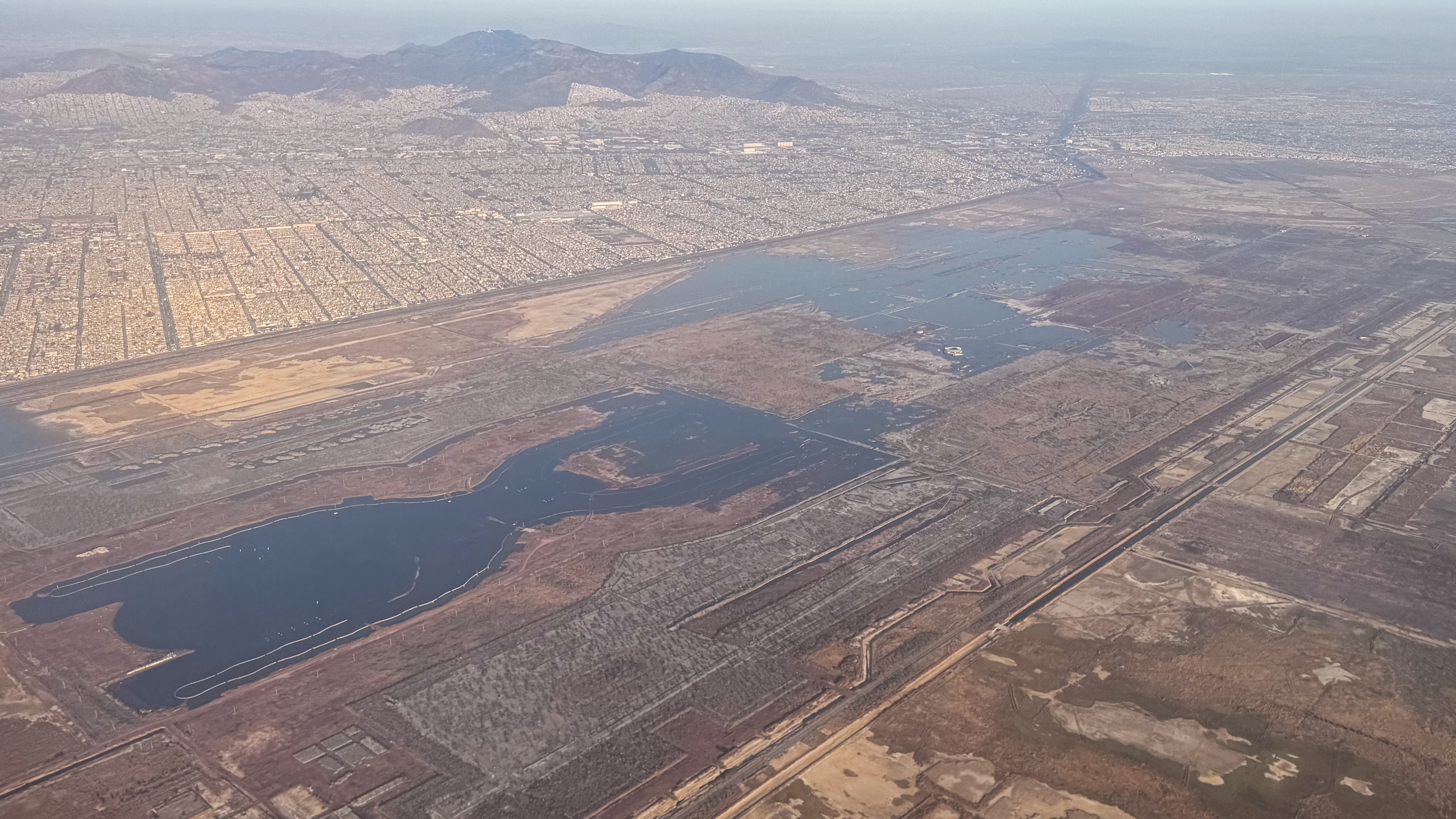
- View of the abandoned construction site, 2026
- IATA: ~~MEX~~; ICAO: ~~MMMX~~

Summary
- Serves: Mexico City
- Location: Zona Federal del Lago de Texcoco, municipalities of Ecatepec, Atenco and Texcoco, State of Mexico, Greater Mexico City
- Coordinates: 19.5°N 98.9975°W

Map
- Location within Mexico City urban area Location within Mexico Location within North America

Runways
Direction	Length		Surface
Direction	m	ft	Surface
17R/35L	4,500	14,764	Asphalt
17L/35R	5,000	16,404	Asphalt
18R/36L	5,000	16,404	Asphalt
18L/36R	4,500	14,764	Asphalt
01L/19R	4,500	14,764	Asphalt
01R/19L	4,000	13,123	Asphalt

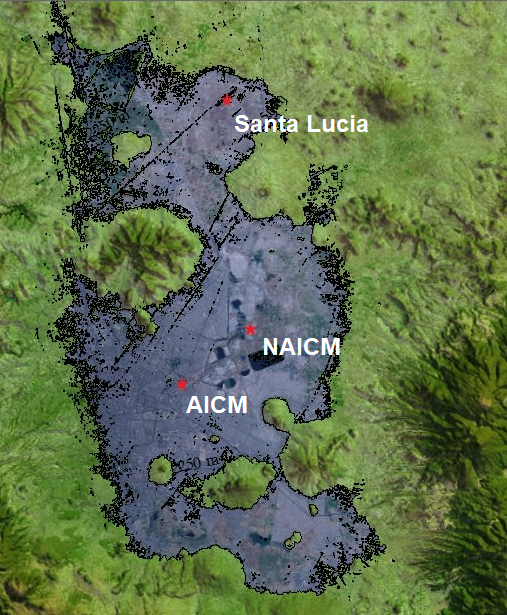
Airports built on the old Texcoco Lake

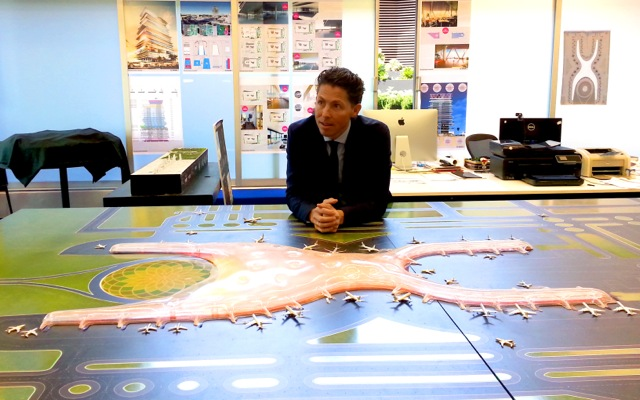
Fernando Romero with a model of the airport

Mexico City Texcoco Airport was a planned airport in Mexico City that was meant to become Mexico's New International Airport (Spanish: Nuevo Aeropuerto Internacional de México—NAICM or NAIM). The project was announced in September 2014 but was canceled in late 2018 after a referendum was held stating that the new airport should be built at a different location due to how close it was to housing, rising cost, and its location on subsiding former wetlands.

Texcoco Airport was first announced by President Enrique Peña Nieto in his State of the Union Address on 2 September 2014. It was billed as Mexico's largest public infrastructure work in a century, and was set to replace Mexico City's current Benito Juárez International Airport.

In October 2018, while construction was already taking place, a non-binding referendum was organized by then President-elect Andrés Manuel López Obrador, in which almost 70 percent of the 1.067 million voters rejected the planned airport, choosing instead to build a new airport on the grounds of Santa Lucía Air Force Base. Felipe Ángeles International Airport opened in March 2022.

Construction continued for several weeks, but was suspended on 27 December 2018 after López Obrador took office. In 2020, the government of Mexico announced that they would convert the 12,000-hectare (46 sq mi) space where the airport was being built into the Lake Texcoco Ecological Park, which will be a public space and an area of ecological restoration.

== Location ==
Texcoco Airport was to be constructed on a 44-square-kilometre (17 sq mi) site in the Zona Federal del Lago de Texcoco, in part of the dry bed of Lake Texcoco. The site was only 5 kilometres (3 mi) away from the existing Benito Juárez Airport, making the simultaneous operation of the airports impossible. It was therefore planned that all operations and traffic from Benito Juárez would be transferred to NAIM upon the airport reaching operational status.

== Costs and financing ==
The total cost for construction and initial operation of NAIM was estimated at up to US$13.3 billion, of which approximately 60% was to be contributed by the Mexican government through public funds, and approximately 40% was expected to be funded through a combination of bank loans and the offering of debt securities.

The Grupo Aeroportuario de la Ciudad de México (GACM), which is fully owned by the Mexican Secretariat of Communications and Transportation (SCT), was to build and operate the new airport. The GACM created a special purpose trust, the Mexico City Airport Trust, in order to execute the airport's private financing. The trust structured the private contributions as securities drawing from passenger charges at the existing AICM and the future passenger charges of the new airport, without recourse to the Mexican government or the airport sponsors. This collateral structure was designed to ensure that even if the project were to be canceled, the issued bonds would still be honored.

In September 2017, the Mexico City Airport Trust successfully placed US$4 billion in private debt securities for the financing of NAIM. $2 billion were issued in long-term green bonds. This green bond issuance became the largest in Latin America at the time and the first green bond from an emerging market to receive a Green Bond Assessment grade from Moody's Investors Service.

== Facilities ==
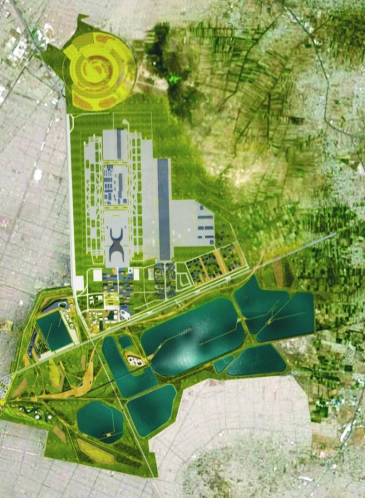
NAICM and Hydraulic Project

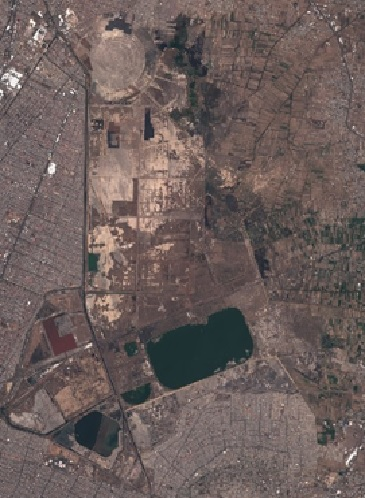
NAICM site in 2015

The facilities at NAIM were planned to be completed in several stages. By 20 October 2020, the airport was expected to have one main terminal of 8,000,000 square feet (743,000 m^{2}) and three independent runways, which would yield a capacity for 68 million passengers annually. By 2065, the airport was expected to host six runways, an additional main terminal, and two satellite terminals, giving it a capacity for 125 million passengers. This would have made NAIM the second largest airport in the world.

The construction plan for the airport was developed by the global engineering and consultancy company Arup Group Limited. The architectural project was to be designed in collaboration by Norman Foster, who worked on Beijing Capital International Airport and Hong Kong International Airport, and Mexican architect Fernando Romero, who worked on the Soumaya Museum.

=== Terminal design ===
The entrance to the terminal was to feature a garden of cacti and symbols of the eagle and snake, part of the national symbol pictured on the country's Coat of Arms and flag.

The main terminal was to be constructed in an X shape, which is considered an efficient way to extend the number of gates, and is used in many other airports. The X shape is also thought to be symbolic of the country's name, "México".

According to the architects, the terminal was to be built in the style of Mexican architecture and was to be much larger than typical terminals, with a maximum internal span in excess of 170 metres (560 ft). The roof was to be made of a lightweight membrane-like material. The whole terminal was to be constructed using pre-fabricated segments.

Mexican architect	Foreign architect	Airport technology consultant	Structural engineer
Fernando Romero	Foster and Partners	Netherlands Airport Consultants	Arup
Bernardo Gómez Pimienta	Gensler	TransSolutions	Walter P. Moore and Aguilar Ingenieros Consultores
Teodoro González de León and Alberto Kalach	Fentress Architects	Landrum & Brown	DITEC/URS
Ricardo Legorreta Vilchis	Rogers Stirk Harbour + Partners	Stantec	Stantec
Francisco López-Guerra Almada	Helmut Jahn	WSP Group	Werner Sobek Stuttgart and Postensa
Enrique Norten	Skidmore, Owings and Merrill	Leo A. Daly	CTC Ingenieros Civiles
Serrano Arquitectos y Asociados	Zaha Hadid Architects	Ricondo and Associates	Izquierdo Ingenieros y Asociados, García Hermanos y Asociados, Javier Alonso and WSP
Sordo Madaleno Arquitectos	Pascall+Watson	Logplan	Grupo Riobóo

=== Sustainability ===
The project claimed it was "designed to be the world’s most sustainable airport", and was aiming for a LEED Platinum certification.

== Antecedents and protests ==
In 2002, President Vicente Fox announced the construction of a new, larger airport on 5,000 ha (12,000 acres) of land in the municipalities of Texcoco and San Salvador Atenco in the same area as was later planned. When protests held by the Community Front in Defense of Land - an organization of locals who were to be displaced - were violently repressed, the new airport was cancelled.

Prior to the 2014 announcement of the construction of the new airport, the government had purchased ejido land (agricultural land held in common by local communities), in order to make space for the new airport. Some local groups in Atenco and nearby communities claimed that the federal government had acquired the land through deception and strong-arming, and small-scale protests took place after the announcement. The airport plan drew negative reactions across social media with the new movement, #YoPriefieroElLago, in which the distribution of infographics and "fast facts" spread across various platforms. The movement culminated in the creation of a mini-documentary of the same name documenting the airport plan, the land and space it would require, interviews with Atenco community members, and the proliferation of the social media movement.

Post-closure

According to the SCT, cancellation of the project left a debt of US$6 billion in bonds and $30 billion in securities, which will be paid off through the landing fees at Benito Juárez International Airport over a period of 19 years. This debt is in addition to the US$56.8 billion paid to the GACM as compensation for the cessation agreement of the fees. None of the money raised through the landing fees at Benito Juárez can be allocated for the construction of the new Mexico City Santa Lucía Airport or for maintenance of the current airport.

In early 2021, the Superior Auditor of the Federation estimated that cancelling the airport would cost 113 billion pesos.

=== Alleged fraud ===
On 10 July 2020, it was alleged that Grupo Gilbert had fraudulently won possession of 49,000 tons of steel that had originally been designated for the NAIM.

On 12 August 2020, Hugo Bello, leader of the Confederacón Libertad de Trabajadores de México (Freedom Confederation of Mexican Workers), was arrested for kidnapping and for suspected involvement in embezzlement of money destined for construction of the now-defunct airport.

== Ecological Park project ==
The Lake Texcoco Ecological Park, officially called Parque Ecológico Lago de Texcoco (PELT), is a national park in the State of Mexico, and a federal government project. It is part of the larger metropolitan area in the Valley of Mexico, around Mexico City.

The planned area for the park is 14,000 ha (35,000 acres), of which 4,800 ha (12,000 acres) will be public spaces. The park was inaugurated by the president of Mexico Andrés Manuel López Obrador on 30 August 2024. The park was designated after the cancellation of an airport in the same location.

The park is both a major ecological restoration project, and a site with great potential for climate adaptation for Mexico City.
