= List of cities in Mexico =

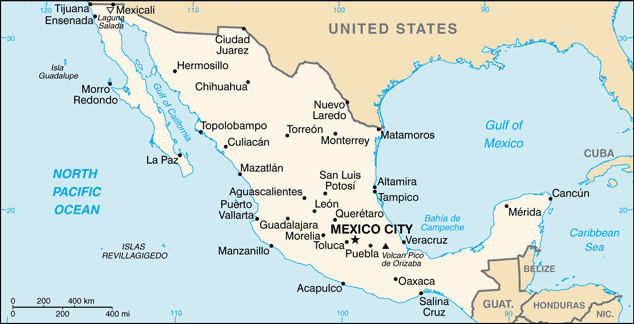
Cities in Mexico

This is a list of the top 100 cities in Mexico by fixed population, according to the 2020 Mexican National Census.

According to Mexico's National Institute of Statistics and Geography (INEGI), a locality is "any place settled with one or more dwellings, which may or may not be inhabited, and which is known by a name given by law or tradition". Urban localities are those with more than 2,500 residents, which can be designated as cities, villages or towns according to the laws of each state. The National Urban System, compiled by the National Population Council (CONAPO) in 2018, identifies 401 urban localities in Mexico with more than 15,000 residents as "cities". Most localities defined by INEGI are contained within a single municipality, although exceptions such as Naucalpan and Veracruz exist.

For a list of metropolitan areas defined by CONAPO, many of which comprise more than one urban locality according to INEGI's definitions, see Metropolitan areas of Mexico.

== Top 100 cities by population ==
Only one state (Tlaxcala) has no cities in the Top 500. Mexico City contains all of the federal entity's area, including rural areas with relatively small populations. All of the map links are of the same scale.

State capital
State largest city
State capital and largest city
Federal capital

Rank	City	Municipality	State	Geo. coordinates	2020 Census	2010 Census	Change
1	Mexico City	16 boroughs‡	Mexico City	19°25′57″N 99°07′52″W	9,209,944	8,851,080	+4.05%
2	Tijuana	Tijuana	Baja California	32°32′05″N 117°02′37″W	1,810,645	1,512,512	+19.71%
3	Ecatepec	Ecatepec	State of Mexico	19°36′35″N 99°03′36″W	1,643,623	1,655,015	−0.69%
4	León	León	Guanajuato	21°07′11″N 101°40′50″W	1,579,803	1,319,361	+19.74%
5	Puebla	Puebla	Puebla	19°02′43″N 98°11′51″W	1,542,232	1,434,062	+7.54%
6	Ciudad Juárez	Juárez	Chihuahua	31°44′22″N 106°29′13″W	1,501,551	1,321,015	+13.67%
7	Guadalajara	Guadalajara	Jalisco	20°40′35″N 103°20′32″W	1,385,629	1,495,182	−7.33%
8	Monterrey	Monterrey	Nuevo León	25°40′17″N 100°18′31″W	1,142,952	1,135,512	+0.66%
9	Nezahualcóyotl	Nezahualcóyotl	State of Mexico	19°23′59″N 98°59′22″W	1,072,676	1,104,603	−2.89%
10	Zapopan	Zapopan	Jalisco	20°43′14″N 103°23′18″W	1,476,491	1,143,168	+29.16%
11	Chihuahua	Chihuahua	Chihuahua	28°38′07″N 106°05′20″W	925,762	809,685	+14.34%
12	Mérida	Mérida	Yucatán	20°58′04″N 89°37′18″W	921,771	780,423	+18.11%
13	Naucalpan	Naucalpan, Huixquilucan‡	State of Mexico	19°28′31″N 99°14′16″W	911,168	913,681	−0.28%
14	Cancún	Benito Juárez	Quintana Roo	21°09′38″N 86°50′51″W	888,797	628,306	+41.46%
15	Saltillo	Saltillo	Coahuila	25°26′00″N 101°00′00″W	864,431	709,674	+21.81%
16	Aguascalientes	Aguascalientes	Aguascalientes	21°52′51″N 102°17′46″W	863,893	729,380	+18.44%
17	Hermosillo	Hermosillo	Sonora	29°05′56″N 110°57′15″W	855,563	715,229	+19.62%
18	Mexicali	Mexicali	Baja California	32°39′48″N 115°28′04″W	854,186	689,775	+23.84%
19	San Luis Potosí	San Luis Potosí	San Luis Potosí	22°08′59″N 100°58′30″W	845,941	724,252	+16.80%
20	Culiacán	Culiacán	Sinaloa	24°47′31″N 107°23′53″W	808,416	675,841	+19.62%
21	Querétaro	Querétaro	Querétaro	20°35′17″N 100°23′17″W	794,789	646,720	+22.90%
22	Morelia	Morelia	Michoacán	19°42′08″N 101°11′08″W	743,275	645,251	+15.19%
23	Chimalhuacán	Chimalhuacán	State of Mexico	19°26′15″N 98°57′15″W	703,215	612,383	+14.83%
24	Reynosa	Reynosa	Tamaulipas	26°05′32″N 98°16′40″W	691,557	592,532	+16.71%
25	Torreón	Torreón	Coahuila	25°32′40″N 103°26′30″W	690,193	611,447	+12.88%
26	Tlalnepantla	Tlalnepantla	State of Mexico	19°32′12″N 99°11′41″W	658,907	653,410	+0.84%
27	Acapulco	Acapulco	Guerrero	16°51′42″N 99°53′11″W	658,609	674,764	−2.39%
28	Tlaquepaque	Tlaquepaque	Jalisco	20°38′19″N 103°18′26″W	650,123	577,911	+12.50%
29	Guadalupe	Guadalupe	Nuevo León	25°40′45″N 100°14′06″W	635,862	673,626	−5.61%
30	Durango	Durango	Durango	24°01′22″N 104°39′16″W	616,068	520,351	+18.39%
31	Tuxtla Gutiérrez	Tuxtla Gutiérrez	Chiapas	16°45′11″N 93°06′56″W	578,830	537,112	+7.77%
32	Cuautitlán Izcalli	Cuautitlán Izcalli	State of Mexico	19°38′46″N 99°12′41″W	555,163	484,573	+14.57%
33	Veracruz	Veracruz, Boca del Río‡	Veracruz	19°11′25″N 96°09′12″W	537,963	562,984	−4.44%
34	Ciudad Apodaca	Apodaca	Nuevo León	25°46′54″N 100°11′20″W	536,436	467,185	+14.82%
35	Ciudad López Mateos	Atizapán de Zaragoza	State of Mexico	19°33′40″N 99°14′49″W	523,065	489,160	+6.93%
36	Matamoros	Matamoros	Tamaulipas	25°52′47″N 97°30′15″W	510,739	449,817	+13.54%
37	General Escobedo	General Escobedo	Nuevo León	25°48′31″N 100°19′37″W	454,967	352,475	+29.08%
38	Irapuato	Irapuato	Guanajuato	20°40′27″N 101°20′51″W	452,090	405,456	+11.50%
39	Xalapa	Xalapa	Veracruz	19°32′17″N 96°54′33″W	443,063	424,766	+4.31%
40	Tonalá	Tonalá	Jalisco	20°37′24″N 103°14′44″W	442,440	408,951	+8.19%
41	Mazatlán	Mazatlán	Sinaloa	23°14′29″N 106°24′35″W	441,975	381,587	+15.83%
42	Nuevo Laredo	Nuevo Laredo	Tamaulipas	27°29′11″N 99°30′29″W	416,055	375,439	+10.82%
43	San Nicolás	San Nicolás de los Garza	Nuevo León	25°44′30″N 100°18′08″W	412,199	443,273	−7.01%
44	Ojo de Agua	Tecámac	State of Mexico	19°40′49″N 99°00′36″W	386,290	242,518	+59.28%
45	Xico	Valle de Chalco	State of Mexico	19°17′30″N 98°56′20″W	384,327	356,352	+7.85%
46	Celaya	Celaya	Guanajuato	20°31′44″N 100°48′54″W	378,143	344,757	+9.68%
47	Tepic	Tepic	Nayarit	21°30′59″N 104°53′39″W	371,387	332,863	+11.57%
48	Ixtapaluca	Ixtapaluca	State of Mexico	19°19′07″N 98°52′56″W	368,585	322,271	+14.37%
49	Cuernavaca	Cuernavaca	Morelos	18°55′07″N 99°14′03″W	341,029	338,650	+0.70%
50	Villahermosa	Centro	Tabasco	17°59′21″N 92°55′41″W	340,060	353,577	−3.82%
51	Ciudad Victoria	Victoria	Tamaulipas	23°44′10″N 99°08′46″W	332,100	305,234	+8.80%
52	Ensenada	Ensenada	Baja California	31°51′28″N 116°36′21″W	330,652	286,518	+15.40%
53	Ciudad Obregón	Cajeme	Sonora	27°29′21″N 109°56′06″W	329,404	298,698	+10.28%
54	Ciudad Nicolás Romero	Nicolás Romero	State of Mexico	19°37′30″N 99°18′51″W	323,545	281,799	+14.81%
55	Soledad	Soledad	San Luis Potosí	22°10′59″N 100°56′27″W	310,192	255,045	+21.62%
56	Ciudad Benito Juárez	Juárez	Nuevo León	25°38′51″N 100°05′41″W	308,285	151,958	+102.88%
57	Playa del Carmen	Solidaridad	Quintana Roo	20°37′39″N 87°04′52″W	304,942	149,926	+103.40%
58	Santa Catarina	Santa Catarina	Nuevo León	25°40′32″N 100°27′44″W	304,052	268,347	+13.31%
59	Gómez Palacio	Gómez Palacio	Durango	25°33′40″N 103°29′54″W	301,742	258,882	+16.56%
60	Uruapan	Uruapan	Michoacán	19°25′10″N 102°03′30″W	299,523	264,481	+13.25%
61	Los Mochis	Ahome	Sinaloa	25°47′37″N 108°59′49″W	298,009	256,747	+16.07%
62	Pachuca	Pachuca	Hidalgo	20°07′18″N 98°44′09″W	297,848	256,750	+16.01%
63	Tampico	Tampico	Tamaulipas	22°15′19″N 97°52′07″W	297,373	297,284	+0.03%
64	Tehuacán	Tehuacán	Puebla	18°27′50″N 97°23′35″W	293,825	249,735	+17.65%
65	San Francisco Coacalco	Coacalco	State of Mexico	19°38′00″N 99°05′35″W	293,245	277,959	+5.50%
66	Nogales	Nogales	Sonora	31°19′07″N 110°56′45″W	261,137	215,551	+21.15%
67	Oaxaca	Oaxaca	Oaxaca	17°04′04″N 96°43′12″W	258,913	255,532	+1.32%
68	La Paz	La Paz	Baja California Sur	24°08′32″N 110°18′39″W	250,141	217,534	+14.99%
69	Campeche	Campeche	Campeche	19°50′45″N 90°32′12″W	249,623	220,490	+13.21%
70	Monclova	Monclova	Coahuila	26°54′03″N 101°25′00″W	237,169	215,475	+10.07%
71	García	García	Nuevo León	25°49′00″N 100°35′00″W	234,698	93,656	+150.60%
72	Chilpancingo	Chilpancingo	Guerrero	17°33′00″N 99°30′04″W	225,728	187,619	+20.31%
73	Puerto Vallarta	Puerto Vallarta	Jalisco	20°36′49″N 105°13′38″W	224,166	203,368	+10.23%
74	Toluca	Toluca	State of Mexico	19°17′32″N 99°39′14″W	223,876	489,333	−54.25%
75	Tapachula	Tapachula	Chiapas	14°54′29″N 92°15′38″W	217,550	202,759	+7.29%
76	Buenavista	Tultitlán	State of Mexico	19°36′30″N 99°10′10″W	216,776	206,081	+5.19%
77	Coatzacoalcos	Coatzacoalcos	Veracruz	18°08′09″N 94°27′48″W	212,540	235,983	−9.93%
78	Ciudad Madero	Ciudad Madero	Tamaulipas	22°16′35″N 97°49′53″W	205,933	197,216	+4.42%
79	Cabo San Lucas	Los Cabos	Baja California Sur	22°53′23″N 109°54′56″W	202,694	131,770	+53.82%
80	Chicoloapan	Chicoloapan	State of Mexico	19°24′55″N 98°54′04″W	193,532	172,919	+11.92%
81	Ciudad del Carmen	Carmen	Campeche	18°38′18″N 91°50′07″W	191,238	169,577	+12.77%
82	San Cristóbal	San Cristóbal de las Casas	Chiapas	16°44′12″N 92°38′18″W	183,509	158,027	+16.13%
83	Poza Rica	Poza Rica	Veracruz	20°32′03″N 97°26′37″W	180,057	187,601	−4.02%
84	San Juan del Río	San Juan del Río	Querétaro	20°23′20″N 99°59′47″W	177,719	144,538	+22.96%
85	San Luis Río Colorado	San Luis Río Colorado	Sonora	32°28′36″N 114°45′45″W	176,685	158,089	+11.76%
86	Chalco	Chalco	State of Mexico	19°15′53″N 98°53′51″W	174,704	168,720	+3.55%
87	Jiutepec	Jiutepec	Morelos	18°52′53″N 99°10′40″W	174,629	162,427	+7.51%
88	Piedras Negras	Piedras Negras	Coahuila	28°42′00″N 100°31′23″W	173,959	150,966	+15.23%
89	Guadalupe	Guadalupe	Zacatecas	22°45′10″N 102°30′28″W	170,029	125,320	+35.68%
90	Chetumal	Othón P. Blanco	Quintana Roo	18°30′13″N 88°18′19″W	169,028	151,277	+11.73%
91	Miramar	Altamira	Tamaulipas	22°19′59″N 97°51′59″W	161,820	119,375	+35.56%
92	Salamanca	Salamanca	Guanajuato	20°34′13″N 101°11′50″W	160,682	160,169	+0.32%
93	Ciudad Acuña	Acuña	Coahuila	29°19′27″N 100°55′54″W	160,225	134,286	+19.32%
94	Manzanillo	Manzanillo	Colima	19°03′08″N 104°18′57″W	159,853	130,086	+22.88%
95	San Pablo de las Salinas	Tultitlán	State of Mexico	19°39′56″N 99°05′30″W	157,998	189,453	−16.60%
96	Cuautla	Cuautla	Morelos	18°48′44″N 98°57′21″W	157,336	154,358	+1.93%
97	Zamora	Zamora	Michoacán	19°59′08″N 102°16′59″W	154,546	141,957	+8.87%
98	Minatitlán	Minatitlán, Cosoleacaque‡	Veracruz	17°59′00″N 94°33′00″W	149,162	159,557	−6.51%
99	Villa de Álvarez	Villa de Álvarez	Colima	19°15′50″N 103°44′13″W	147,496	117,607	+25.41%
100	Colima	Colima	Colima	19°14′30″N 103°43′41″W	146,965	137,502	+6.88%

‡ These cities extend beyond the borders of a single municipality.

=== Distribution ===
For the Top 100 cities, the following distributions hold as of the 2020 Census.

The total population is 57,930,969, 45.97% of Mexico's total.

The mean city population is 579,310. The median city in population is Villahermosa.

The mean city growth from 2010 to 2020 is 20.77%, compared to a national growth of 12.17%. The median city in population growth is Ixtapaluca.

Population	Number of cities
1,000,000+	10
500,000–999,999	26
250,000–499,999	32
100,000–249,999	32
Total	100

State	Number of listed cities
State of Mexico	17
Nuevo León	8
Tamaulipas	7
Coahuila, Jalisco, Veracruz	5
Guanajuato, Sonora	4
Baja California, Chiapas, Colima, Michoacán, Morelos, Quintana Roo. Sinaloa	3
Baja California Sur, Campeche, Chihuahua, Durango, Guerrero, Puebla, Querétaro, San Luis Potosí	2
Aguascalientes, Hidalgo, Mexico City, Nayarit, Oaxaca, Tabasco, Yucatán, Zacatecas	1
Tlaxcala	0

== See also ==
- List of most populous cities in Mexico by decade
- List of municipalities in Mexico by population
- Metropolitan areas of Mexico
- Demographics of Mexico
