= 20th federal electoral district of the State of Mexico =

Federal electoral district of Mexico

State of Mexico's 20th
- Electoral district of the Chamber of Deputies of Mexico

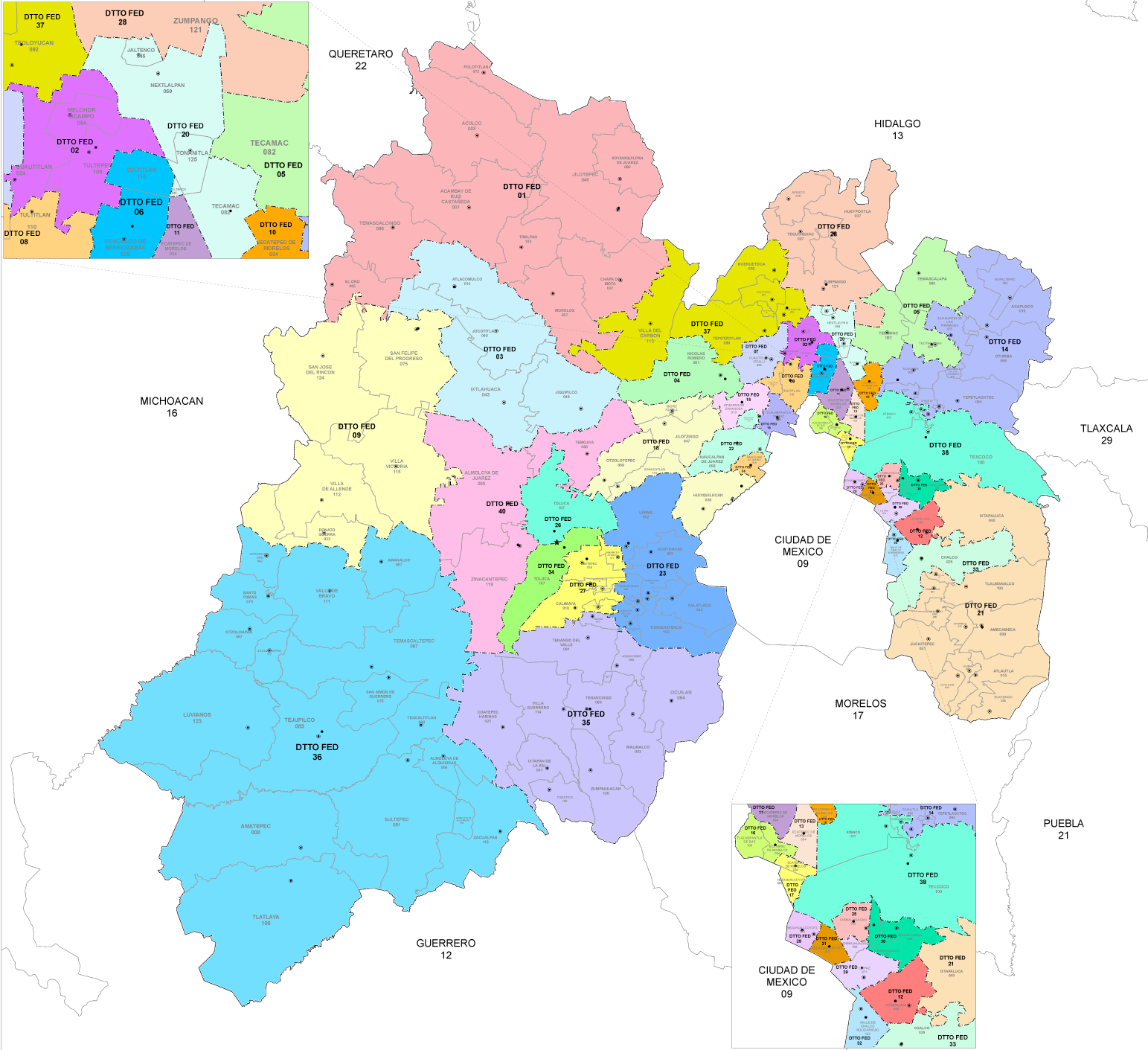
- State of Mexico's districts since 2023

Incumbent
- Member: Montserrat Ruiz Paez
- Party: ▌Morena
- Congress: 66th (2024–2027)

District
- State: State of Mexico
- Head town: Ojo de Agua
- Coordinates: 19°41′N 99°00′W
- Covers: Jaltenco, Nextlalpan, Tonanitla, Tecámac (part)
- PR region: Fifth
- Precincts: 158
- Population: 383,060 (2020 census)

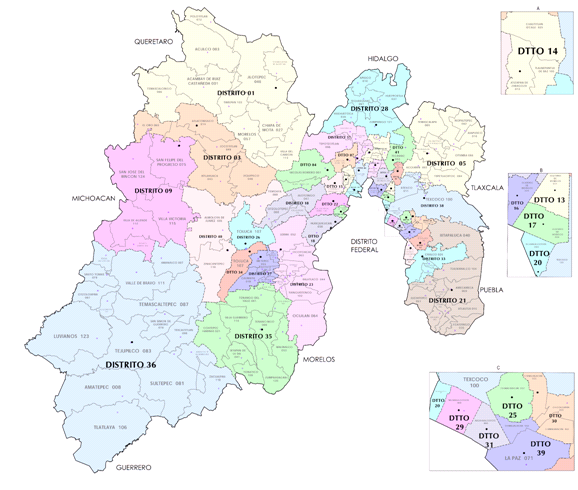
2017–2022 districting scheme

The 20th federal electoral district of the State of Mexico (Spanish: Distrito electoral federal 20 del Estado de México) is one of the 300 electoral districts into which Mexico is divided for elections to the federal Chamber of Deputies and one of 40 such districts in the State of Mexico.

It elects one deputy to the lower house of Congress for each three-year legislative session by means of the first-past-the-post system. Votes cast in the district also count towards the calculation of proportional representation ("plurinominal") deputies elected from the fifth region.

The 20th district was created by the 1977 electoral reforms, which increased the number of single-member seats in the Chamber of Deputies from 196 to 300. Under that plan, the State of Mexico's seat allocation rose from 15 to 34. The new districts were first contended in the 1979 mid-term election.

The current member for the district, elected in the 2024 general election, is Montserrat Ruiz Paez of the National Regeneration Movement (Morena).

== District territory ==
Under the 2023 districting plan adopted by the National Electoral Institute (INE), which is to be used for the 2024, 2027 and 2030 federal elections, the 20th district covers 158 electoral precincts (secciones electorales) across four of the state's 125 municipalities:

- Jaltenco, Nextlalpan, Tonanitla and the southern portion of Tecámac. (Note: The remainder of Tecámac is in the 5th district.)

The head town (cabecera distrital), where results from individual polling stations are gathered together and tallied, is the city of Ojo de Agua, Tecámac. In the 2020 census, the district reported a total population of 383,060.

== Previous districting schemes ==
Evolution of electoral district numbers
	1974	1978	1996	2005	2017	2023
State of Mexico	15	34	36	40	41	40
Chamber of Deputies	196	300				

Under the previous districting plans enacted by the INE and its predecessors, the 20th district was situated as follows:

2017–2022

The northern portion of the municipality of Nezahualcóyotl.

2005–2017

The northern portion of the municipality of Nezahualcóyotl, slightly smaller than under the 2022 plan.

1996–2005

The northern portion of the municipality of Nezahualcóyotl, slightly smaller than under the 2005 plan.

1978–1996

A portion of Naucalpan de Juárez.

== Deputies returned to Congress ==
(Mexico) National parties
- Current
- PAN
- PRI
- PT
- PVEM
- MC
- Morena
- PAZ
- Somos
- Defunct or local only
- PLM
- PNR
- PRM
- PNM
- PP
- PPS
- PARM
- PFCRN
- CON
- PANAL
- PSD
- PES
- PES
- PRD

State of Mexico's 20th district
Election	Deputy	Party	Term	Legislature
1979	José Antonio Rivas Roa	Institutional Revolutionary Party	1979–1982	51st Congress
1982	José Ruiz González	Institutional Revolutionary Party	1982–1985	52nd Congress
1985	Serafín Roa Cortés	Institutional Revolutionary Party	1985–1988	53rd Congress
1988	Mario Galicía Vargas	Popular Socialist Party (Mexico)	1988–1991	54th Congress
1991	Roberto Soto Prieto	Institutional Revolutionary Party	1991–1994	55th Congress
1994	Roberto Flores González	Institutional Revolutionary Party	1994–1997	56th Congress
1997	José Luis Sánchez Campos	Party of the Democratic Revolution	1997–2000	57th Congress
2000	Lionel Funes Díaz	National Action Party (Mexico)	2000–2003	58th Congress
2003	José Luis Naranjo y Quintana	Party of the Democratic Revolution	2003–2006	59th Congress
2006	Martín Zepeda Hernández	Party of the Democratic Revolution	2006–2009	60th Congress
2009	Jesús Ricardo Enríquez Fuentes; Martha Patricia Bernal Díaz (Note: Bernal Díaz was sworn in as the alternate on 30 April 2012.)	Institutional Revolutionary Party	2009–2012; 2012	61st Congress
2012	Joaquina Navarrete Contreras	Party of the Democratic Revolution	2012–2015	62nd Congress
2015	José Santiago López	Party of the Democratic Revolution	2015–2018	63rd Congress
2018	Juan Pablo Sánchez Rodríguez	National Regeneration Movement	2018–2021	64th Congress
2021	Juan Pablo Sánchez Rodríguez	National Regeneration Movement	2021–2024	65th Congress
2024	Montserrat Ruiz Paez	National Regeneration Movement	2024–2027	66th Congress

== Presidential elections ==
State of Mexico's 20th district
Election	District won by	Party or coalition	%
2018	Andrés Manuel López Obrador	Juntos Haremos Historia	59.0476
2024	Claudia Sheinbaum Pardo	Sigamos Haciendo Historia	60.7677
