= Fuentes del Valle =

Coordinates: 19°37′57″N 99°08′19″W

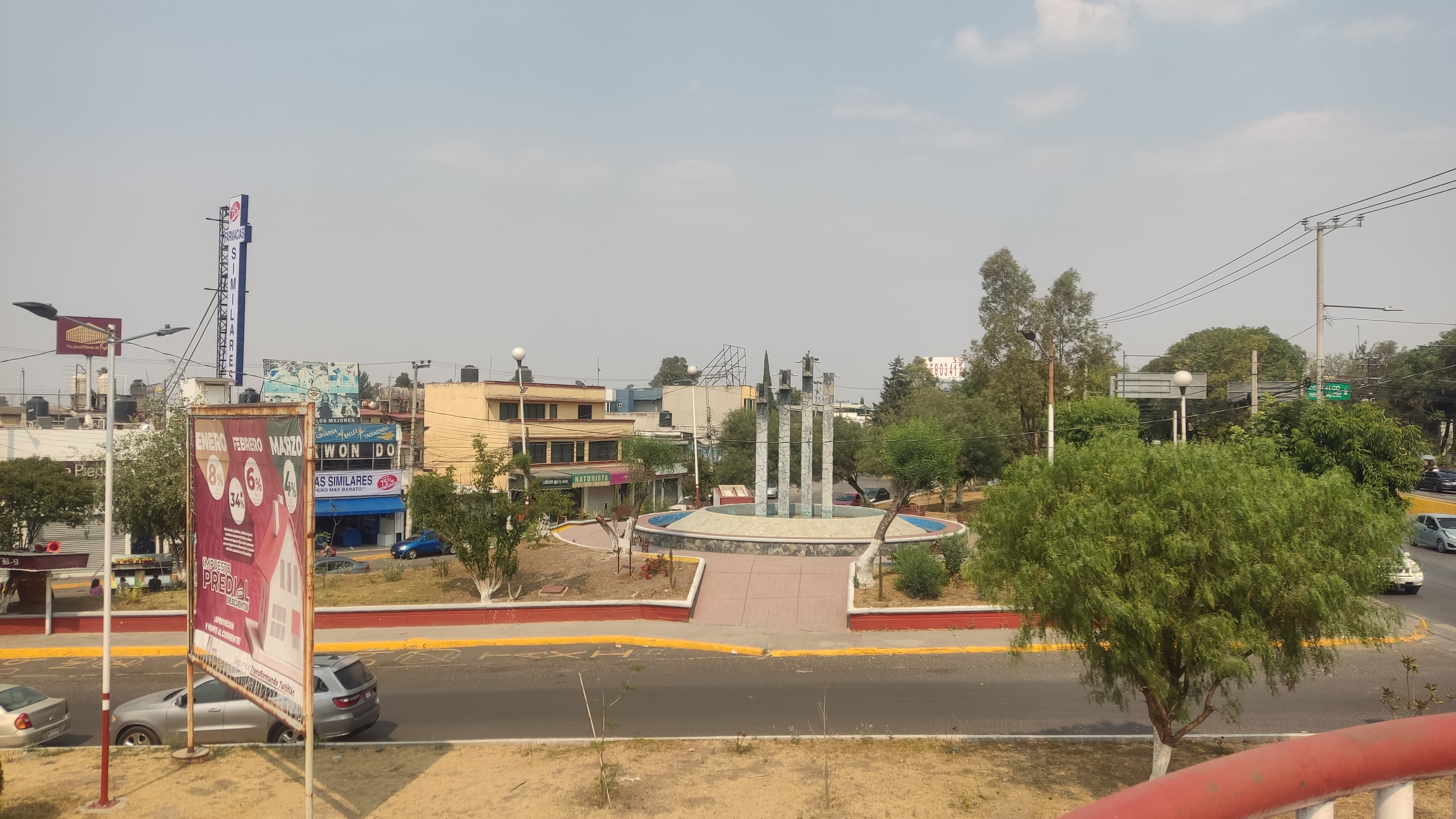
Main entrance

Fuentes del Valle is the third-largest colonia in Tultitlán Municipality in Mexico State, Mexico. The neighborhood is part of the Mexico City metropolitan area and had a 2010 census population of 74,087 inhabitants. It lies near the northern tip of the Federal District (Distrito Federal), and between the larger Buenavista and San Pablo de las Salinas.
