= Tultitlán de Mariano Escobedo =

- Town and Municipality
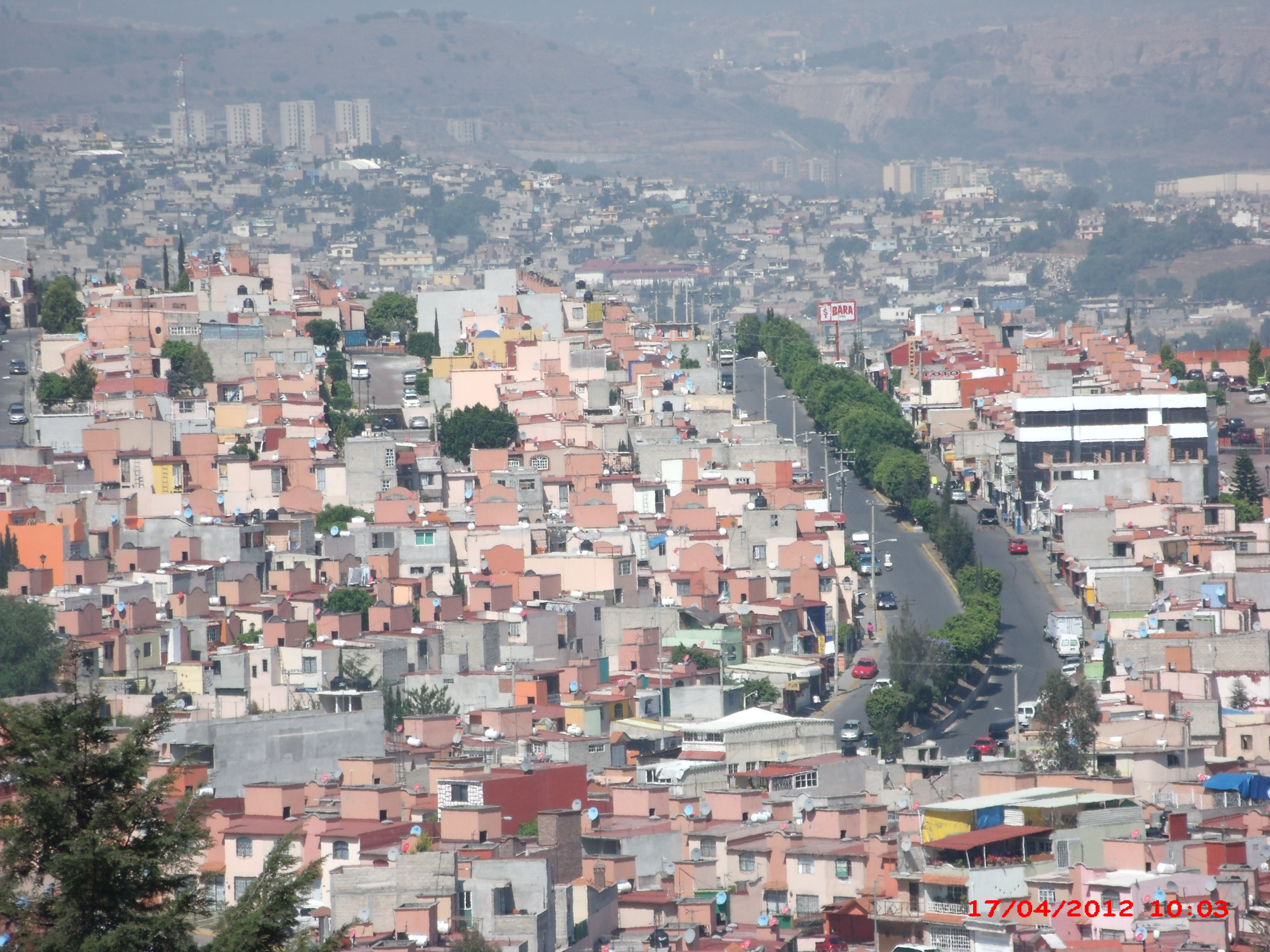
- View from Sierra de Guadalupe

- Coat of arms

- Location of Tultitlán in the State of Mexico
- Coordinates: 19°38′42″N 99°10′10″W
- Country: Mexico
- State: State of Mexico
- Municipality: Tultitlán
- Region: Tultitlán
- Metro area: Greater Mexico City
- Municipality Created: July 12, 1820
- Municipal Seat: Tultitlán de Mariano Escobedo

Government
  - Type: Ayuntamiento
  - Municipal President: Ana María Castro Fernández

Area
  - Land: 69.15 km^{2} (26.70 sq mi)
  - Water: 0.00 km^{2} (0 sq mi)
- Elevation: 2,240 m (7,350 ft)

Population (2020 Census)
  - Total: 516,341
- Time zone: UTC–06:00 (Zona Centro)
- Postal code (of seat): 54900
- Area code: 55
- Demonym: Tultitlense
- Website: Official website (in Spanish)

Tultitlán de Mariano Escobedo is the fourth largest town in and municipal seat of the municipality of Tultitlán located in the northeastern part of the State of México in Mexico. It lies adjacent to the northern tip of the Federal District (Distrito Federal) and is part of the Greater Mexico City urban area. Both the city and the municipality are interchangeably known as San Antonio Tultitlán or simply Tultitlán, a name which comes from Náhuatl meaning "among the tule plants". "de Mariano Escobedo" was added to the city's name in 1902 in honor of the general who fought in the Mexican–American War and for the liberals during the period of La Reforma with Benito Juárez.

== The city ==
The bones of mammoths and other animals have been found in the area, excavated starting in 1991. It is an important site because it establishes the presence of man here to about 15000–13000 BC, making it one of the oldest human settlements in the Americas. Ceramic pieces here date to about 400 BC. Teotihuacan presence is documented around 200 to 750 AD, mostly agricultural villages that also produced items like baskets and rope. Between 850 and 1110, the area was inhabited by peoples speaking Náhuatl and Otomis, while the area was under Toltec domination from the city of Tula (located in the present-day state of Hidalgo). The current city was founded by the Tepanecas in 1356, but its first tlatoani (chief), named Cuauhtzinteuctli, did not begin his rule until 1408. The city's last tlatoani died in 1519 of measles brought over by the Spanish. After the Spanish Conquest, the area was reorganized into large haciendas with the city of Tultitlán under the jurisdiction of Tacuba. The village became a parish in 1605. In 1645, an image of San Antonio de Padua arrived and became the town's patron saint. The small village remained so until 1969 when it was named a town, attaining city status in 1997. As of the 2010 census, the city's population was 31,936.

Principal sites to see in the city include the Temple of San Lorenzo from the 16th century and modifications dating from the 18th century to the 20th century. The Temple of San Antonio de Padua was initiated in the 18th century and finished in the 20th. The Chapel of the Holy Cross (Capilla de la Santa Cruz) was probably begun in the 17th century and is now integrated into the new municipal palace. Aside from these constructions is a cypress (ahuehuete) located in the center of the city that is at least 250 years old.

Armando Portuguez Fuentes, municipal president, died of a heart attack on May 23, 2020.

As of February 18, 2021, there were 4,771 reported cases and 766 deaths in the municipality attributed to the COVID-19 pandemic in Mexico.

== The municipality ==
As municipal seat, the city has governing jurisdiction over the following communities: Buenavista, Sierra de Guadalupe (Loma Sta. Ma. Guadalupe), San Pablo de las Salinas, Fuentes del Valle, Ampliación San Mateo (Colonia Solidaridad), El Cerrito (La Capilla), Colonia Lázaro Cárdenas (Los Hornos), Ejido la Reyna (La Reyna), Ejido de San Antonio Tultitlán, Paraje San Pablito, and Las Chinampas. The largest of these are Buenavista, San Pablo de las Salinas, and Fuentes del Valle. There was a total population of 524,074 in the municipality in 2010. It has the distinction of being the only municipality in Mexico that has two cities (localities) of over 100,000 population (Buenavista and San Pablo de las Salinas). It is also the only municipality with three localities of over 70,000 inhabitants (adding Fuentes del Valle), and the only one with four localities of over 30,000 (adding Tultitlán de Mario Escobedo, its own municipal seat). Buenavista and San Pablo de las Salinas are also the second- and third-largest cities (localities) in Mexico that are not a municipal seat (after Ojo de Agua, Tecámac Municipality, State of México).

=== Towns and villages ===
Localities (cities, towns, and villages) are:

Name	2020 Census Population
Buenavista	216,776
San Pablo de las Salinas	157,998
Fuentes del Valle	82,274
Tultitlán de Mariano Escobedo	30,929
Ampliación San Mateo (Colonia Solidaridad)	19,460
Colonia Lázaro Cárdenas (Los Hornos)	4,473
Sierra de Guadalupe	2,778
Ejido de San Antonio Tultitlán	674
Las Chinampas	453
Paraje San Pablito	324
El Cerrito (La Capilla)	5
Total Municipality	516,341

The municipality was established in 1820. It has two geographically separate sections. The larger southwestern section of the municipality, which contains its municipal seat, borders the municipalities of Cuautitlán, Tultepec, Coacalco de Berriozábal, Tlalnepantla, Cuautitlán Izcalli and the Gustavo A. Madero borough of Mexico City. The geographically separate northeastern section, which contains San Pablo de las Salinas, Paraje San Pablito, and Las Chinampas, is also bordered by Ecatepec de Morelos, Jaltenco, and Nextlalpan. The two sections are separated by the municipalities of Tultepec and Coacalco, which border both sections. The municipality has a territory of 71.1 km^{2} (27.45 sq mi).

The area is subtropical due to its altitude with rainy and dry seasons. It divides into two geographic zones: the plains and the mountain range of La Sierra de Guadalupe, which extendes into various other municipalities and was declared an ecological park.

Climate data for Tultitlán (Presa Guadalupe; 1951–2010)
Month	Jan	Feb	Mar	Apr	May	Jun	Jul	Aug	Sep	Oct	Nov	Dec	Year
Record high °C (°F)	29.5 (85.1)	30.0 (86.0)	35.0 (95.0)	34.5 (94.1)	37.0 (98.6)	33.0 (91.4)	33.5 (92.3)	29.0 (84.2)	29.0 (84.2)	29.0 (84.2)	29.0 (84.2)	29.5 (85.1)	37.0 (98.6)
Mean daily maximum °C (°F)	21.7 (71.1)	23.3 (73.9)	26.0 (78.8)	27.1 (80.8)	26.9 (80.4)	25.4 (77.7)	23.7 (74.7)	23.8 (74.8)	23.0 (73.4)	22.6 (72.7)	22.4 (72.3)	21.6 (70.9)	24 (75)
Daily mean °C (°F)	12.7 (54.9)	14 (57)	16.4 (61.5)	17.9 (64.2)	18.4 (65.1)	18.3 (64.9)	17.4 (63.3)	17.4 (63.3)	17.0 (62.6)	15.6 (60.1)	14.2 (57.6)	13.1 (55.6)	16.0 (60.8)
Mean daily minimum °C (°F)	3.7 (38.7)	4.7 (40.5)	6.8 (44.2)	8.8 (47.8)	9.9 (49.8)	11.3 (52.3)	11.1 (52.0)	11.0 (51.8)	10.9 (51.6)	8.5 (47.3)	6.0 (42.8)	4.5 (40.1)	8.1 (46.6)
Record low °C (°F)	−5.5 (22.1)	−4.5 (23.9)	−3.0 (26.6)	1.0 (33.8)	4.0 (39.2)	4.0 (39.2)	5.5 (41.9)	4.5 (40.1)	2.5 (36.5)	−0.5 (31.1)	−2.5 (27.5)	−5.0 (23.0)	−5.5 (22.1)
Average rainfall mm (inches)	7.1 (0.28)	8.0 (0.31)	11.2 (0.44)	24.7 (0.97)	55.5 (2.19)	125.4 (4.94)	143.3 (5.64)	140.6 (5.54)	121.7 (4.79)	57.7 (2.27)	9.8 (0.39)	5.4 (0.21)	710.4 (27.97)
Average rainy days (≥ 0.1 mm)	1.6	2.0	3.0	5.6	9.8	14.3	18.7	18.0	14.9	8.1	2.8	1.8	100.6
Source: Servicio Meteorológico Nacional

The area is a source of building materials such as stone, and agricultural activities such as the grown of corn, alfalfa and fruit trees is still practiced. However, the urbanization of the area is diminishing the land dedicated to these activities. Industry is now the major employer with entities devoted to chemicals, cardboard boxes, plastics, and various types of metal production.

=== The June Festival ===
One of the most famous attractions in Tultitlan is the San Antonio Local Festival. Each year, it falls on June 14 when all the people from the neighboring areas of Tultitlan centers around the town's parish church to worship San Antonio de Padua, the saint who gives name to the town. The figure of the saint is carried along the streets among the crowd of people and musicians until it finally arrives to the church.

The festival begins on June's first days and is extended almost for one month. Along the festival there are many things to see such as the traditional pottery from the region and other handcraft objects produced in Mexican states. People can also appreciate the fireworks that are always set off every night from the beginning to the end of the festival. In the center of the plaza there are many traditional foods to be found such as quesadillas, pambazos, tlacoyos, huaraches, tacos, baked bread, barbacoa made of sheep and other appetizers like strawberries in cream, fried sausages and many traditional candies (cocada, alegria, chilacayote and obleas). In addition to this food the inhabitants also can find a variety of drinks made with combinations of vodka, beer, whisky, rum, tequila, coke and mineral water.

== Notable people ==
- Omar Lorméndez Pitalúa, Mexican drug lord and high-ranking member of Los Zetas
