= Mexibús Line 1 =

Bus rapid transit line in the State of Mexico

Line 1
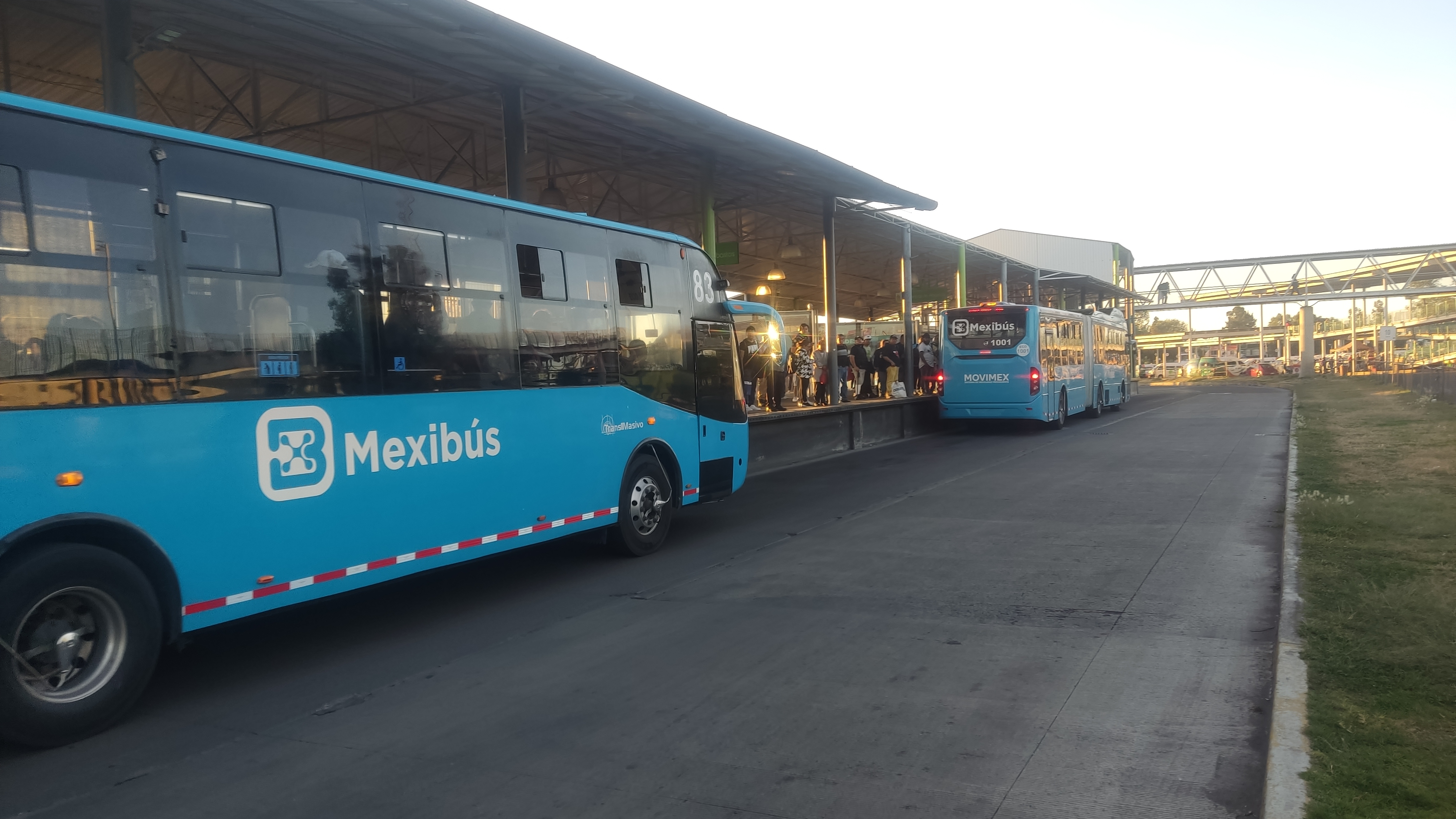
- Buses at Central de Abastos station

Overview
- Status: In service
- Termini: Ciudad Azteca; Central de Abastos / Ojo de Agua / Terminal de Pasajeros
- Stations: 35
- Website: Línea 1

Service
- Type: Bus rapid transit
- System: Mexibús
- Services: 4
- Operator: Transmasivo
- Depot: Ciudad Azteca / Ojo de Agua
- Rolling stock: 75
- Daily ridership: 130,000 (2012)

History
- Opened: 1 December 2010; 15 years ago

Technical
- Line length: 20 km (12.4 mi)
- Character: Exclusive right-of-way (Ciudad Azteca–Ojo de Agua)

The Mexibús Line 1 (also stylized in Roman numbers as I) is a bus rapid transit (BRT) line in the Mexibús system. It operates between Felipe Ángeles International Airport in Zumpango, Ojo de Agua in Tecámac and Ciudad Azteca in Ecatepec de Morelos. It was the first line to be built and to be opened. It was inaugurated by the governor of the State of Mexico, Enrique Peña Nieto on 1 December 2010 with 24 stations. Another station was opened later. It is 20 kilometers (12 mi) long and was used by approximately 130,000 users per day during 2012. The line has four different types of services, including a service exclusive for women and children. The line operates with 75 articulated Volvo 7300 BRT buses painted white with red, light green and dark green trim. It began free operations in October 2010.

== Stations ==
There are three variations of this route:

- TR-1 Ojo de Agua–Ciudad Azteca regular service
- TR-3 Ojo de Agua–Ciudad Azteca express service (women-and-children-only service available)
- TR-4 Central de Abastos–Ciudad Azteca express service
- L1-A Ojo de Agua–Terminal de Pasajeros regular service

Key (Note: The following list was adapted from different websites and official maps.: Metro connections obtained from the official Mexico City Metro system map.; Accessibility obtained from the Mexico City Metro system map. In some cases, the map omits the accessibility icon as the station(s) are actually partially accessible. However, the respective websites of each station on the official site indicate the respective accessibility methods. Stations with the symbol are fully accessible; stations with the symbol are partially accessible.; Cablebús obtained from their official website.; Centro de transferencia modal (CETRAM;) obtained from the official website of the Órgano Regulador de Transporte.; Ecobici obtained from their official website.; Metrobús obtained from the Mexico City Metrobús system map.; Mexibús obtained from the official Mexico City Metro system map.; Mexicable obtained from the official Mexico City Metro system map.; Public buses network (peseros) obtained from the official website of the Órgano Regulador de Transporte.; Red de Transporte de Pasajeros obtained from their official website.; Trolleybuses obtained from their official website.)
Handicapped/disabled access	Fully accessible station	Cablebús Line {{{3}}}	Cablebús connection	Red de Transporte de Pasajeros	RTP connection
Handicapped/disabled access	Partially accessible station	Mexibús	Mexibús connection	Tren Interurbano	Tren Interurbano connection
Transfer hub	CETRAM transfer station	Mexicable	Mexicable connection	Tren Suburbano	Tren Suburbano connection
Transfer hub	ETRAM transfer station	Mexico City Metro	Mexico City Metro connection	Trolleybus	Trolleybus connection
Ecobici	Ecobici bikeshare	Mexico City minubus	Pesero connection	Mexico City Light Rail	Mexico City Light Rail connection

Station (Note: All the stations are fully accessible to people with disabilities.)	TR-1	TR-3	TR-4	L1-A	Location	Connection	Picture	Opened
Ciudad Azteca	●	●	●		Ecatepec de Morelos	Mexico City Metro Line B		1 December 2010
Quinto Sol	●				Ecatepec de Morelos			1 December 2010
Josefa Ortíz	●				Ecatepec de Morelos			1 December 2010
Industrial	●				Ecatepec de Morelos			1 December 2010
UNITEC	●	●	●		Ecatepec de Morelos			1 December 2010
Alfredo Torres	●				Ecatepec de Morelos			1 December 2010
Zodiaco	●				Ecatepec de Morelos			1 December 2010
Adolfo López Mateos	●				Ecatepec de Morelos			1 December 2010
Vocacional 3	●	●	●		Ecatepec de Morelos			1 December 2010
Valle Ecatepec	●				Ecatepec de Morelos			1 December 2010
Las Américas	●				Ecatepec de Morelos			1 December 2010
1° de Mayo	●	●	●		Ecatepec de Morelos	(at Las Américas)		1 December 2010
Hospital	●	●	●		Ecatepec de Morelos	(at Matamoros)		1 December 2010
Aquiles Serdán	●				Ecatepec de Morelos			1 December 2010
Jardines de Morelos	●	●	●		Ecatepec de Morelos	(at Jardines de Morelos); (at Monumento a la Familia)		1 December 2010
Palomas	●				Ecatepec de Morelos			1 December 2010
19 de Septiembre	●				Ecatepec de Morelos			1 December 2010
Central de Abastos	●	●	●		Ecatepec de Morelos	Mexibús Mexibús Line 4		1 December 2010
Insurgentes	●				Ecatepec de Morelos			Between 2015 and 2018 (Note: The station was not inaugurated in 2010 due to low ridership. As of 2015, the station remained closed. By 2018, the station was reported operating.)
Hidalgo	●				Ecatepec de Morelos			1 December 2010
Cuauhtémoc Sur	●				Ecatepec de Morelos			1 December 2010
Cuauhtémoc Norte	●	●			Ecatepec de Morelos			1 December 2010
Esmeralda	●				Tecámac			1 December 2010
Ojo de Agua	●	●		●	Tecámac	State of Mexico minubus		1 December 2010
Loma Bonita				●	Tecámac			21 March 2022
Ozumbilla				●	Tecámac			21 March 2022
San Francisco				●	Tecámac			21 March 2022
Quetzalcóatl				●	Tecámac			Second half of 2023
Tecámac				●	Tecámac			21 March 2022
La Redonda				●	Tecámac			Second half of 2023
Glorieta Militar				●	Zumpango			21 March 2022
Combustibles				●	Zumpango			21 March 2022
Hacienda				●	Zumpango			21 March 2022
Torre de Control				●	Zumpango			July 2026
Terminal de Pasajeros				●	Zumpango	Felipe Ángeles International Airport; Felipe Ángeles (at AIFA)		21 March 2022

=== Former stations ===
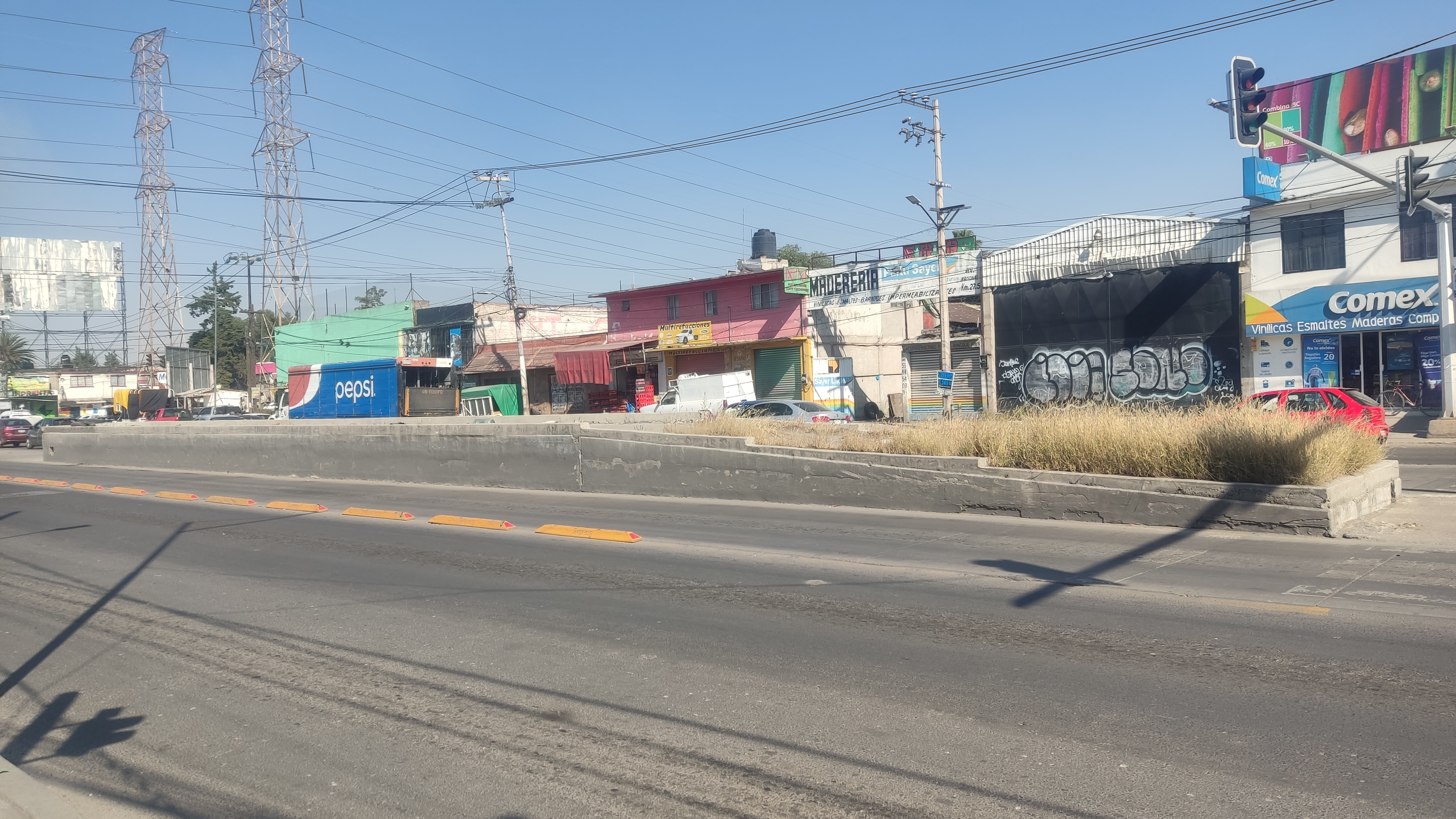
The plinth of the former station

Las Torres Santa María Chiconautla station was closed and totally dismantled in 2022. The station opened in 2010 and served the town of Santa María Chiconautla. To facilitate the operation of Lines I and IV, it was decided to open the then-inoperative Insurgentes station instead. The approximate distance between Hidalgo and Insurgentes stations is 1.5 kilometers (0.93 mi).

== Incidents ==
On 29 May 2021, at 6:00 hours, a driver crashed into the turnstiles of UNITEC station. No riders resulted injured and the driver and their passengers ran away.
