= Censo General de Población y Vivienda =

Main national census of Mexico

The Censo de Población y Vivienda (Population and Housing Census) is the main national population census for Mexico. It is compiled by the National Institute of Statistics and Geography (INEGI), a decentralized agency of the Mexican Federal government, with the purpose of collating and reporting detailed demographic, socioeconomic and geographical data from across the nation, and is conducted every ten years.

As of 2021, there have been a total of 14 national population censuses, the most recent completed in 2020.

== History ==
=== Pre-Columbian era ===
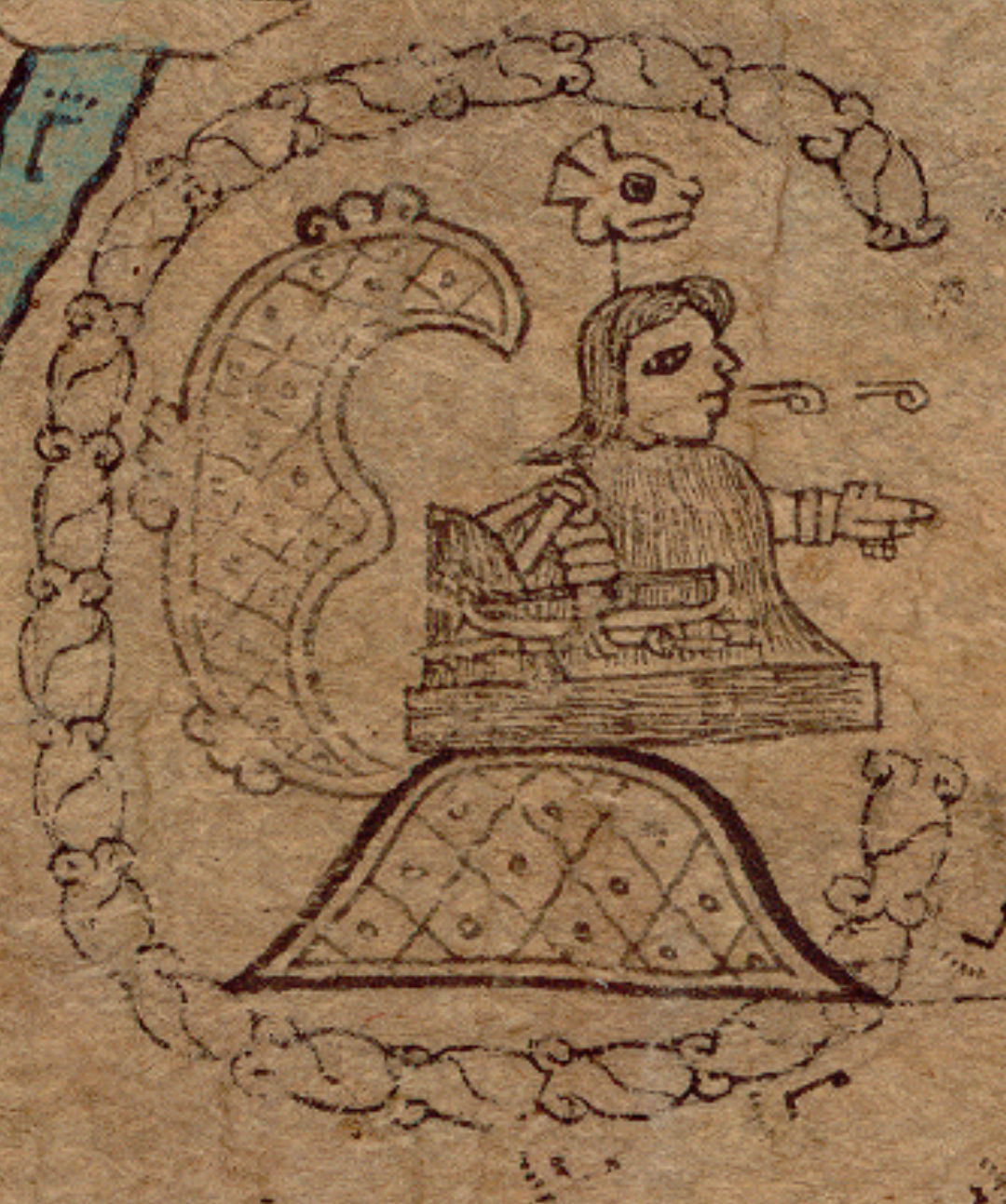
Xolotl in Tenayuca.

The practice of census-taking in Mexico may have precedents dating back to the late pre-Columbian period. According to traditions recorded in several of the post-conquest historical sources, Xólotl, a 12th-century ruler of a Chichimec polity in the Valley of Mexico, ordered a review to be undertaken to enumerate the populace under his control. This survey was carried out close to its capital, Tenayuca, at a locality subsequently named Nepōhualco in Classical Nahuatl, meaning "place of enumeration".

The count was conducted by adding stones to a pile representing each person counted, giving a total of 3,200,000 residents. The retelling of this tradition was documented in the late 18th century by Francesco Clavigero, based on Fray Juan de Torquemada's Monarchia Indiana, first published in 1615. Clavigero himself goes on to doubt some of what Torquemada wrote on the tale, citing aspects of it as "incredible". Nepohualco and the survey is also referenced in the codex Historia Tolteca-Chichimeca, folio 33R.

During the later Aztec Empire, it is known that written census-like records were used to keep track of land ownership and the tribute obligations of individual city-states (altepetl) across central Mexico.

=== Spanish rule ===
In the decades after the conquest and Spanish colonial expansion, the administrators and missionaries for the Real Audiencia of Mexico began the systematic collection of population data for the new territories. One such was the document known as the Suma de visitas de pueblos por orden alfabético from 1548, which contained a survey and description of 907 villages and settlements in central Mexico.

A census taken twenty years later in 1568, covering about 90% of the towns and villages of Central Mexico, is probably the most comprehensive of the 16th-century recorded enumerations. During the later Colonial period in the 17th century a number of other demographic counts and compilations were made. In general the data from these, likely incomplete and rudimentary, are no longer preserved.

It was not until the late 18th century that an accounting of the population was conducted, known as the Revillagigedo census, the first poll to resemble a national census. Conducted under viceroy Juan de Güemes Padilla, Count of Revillagigedo between 1790 and 1791, some forty volumes of data from this census are conserved in the Mexican national archives.

=== Independence and modern era ===
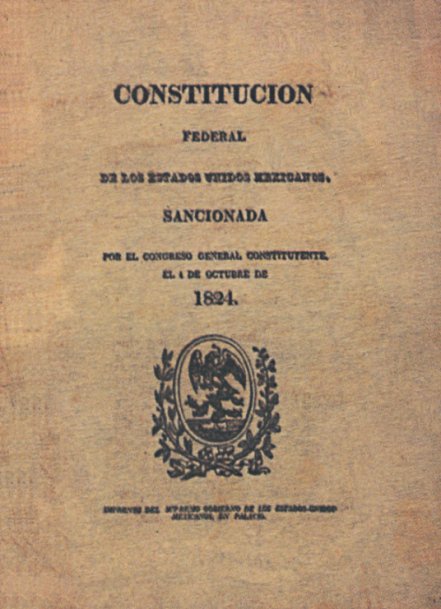
1824 Constitution.

After the Mexican independence from Spain was achieved in 1824, the new Republic sought a process to enumerate the citizens in each of its constituent federated states and entities.

Article 12 of the 1824 Constitution of Mexico expressed this intention:

A census of the whole confederation shall be taken within five years, and shall be renewed afterward every ten years, which shall serve to designate the number of deputies to which each state is entitled. In the meantime, elections are to be regulated on the basis established in the preceding article, and the census which served to regulate the election of deputies in the Congress now in session.

The General Directorate of Statistics was created in 1882. The next year, it issued regulations establishing that the Directorate should conduct a general census of the country's inhabitants every ten years. In 1892, a pilot population census known as "Peñafiel Census" was carried out in Mexico City.

Under the presidency of Porfirio Díaz, the first national statistical enumeration was conducted in 1895, initiating the era of contemporary censuses.

Since 1900, the population census has been conducted on a decennial basis, taking place on the year ending in zero of each decade. The only variation to this schedule thus far occurred with the fourth census, where difficulties arising from the Mexican Revolution resulted in its deferral from 1920 to 1921.

In 1995 and 2005, INEGI compiled an intermediate series of national population and housing statistics, surveying only a selected subset of key demographic indicators. Known as Nacional Population Count (Conteo Nacional de Población), they facilitated the planning for public policy and services by providing more up-to-date statistics than the decennial census. The 2015 count was replaced by an intercensal survey, although the INEGI does not consider that data as official population statistics.

== Official census dates ==
The following table lists the official names and dates of all the conducted national population censuses from 1895.

| Designation | Year | Official Date |
|---|---|---|
| Censo General de la República Mexicana 1895 | 1895 | October 20 |
| Censo General de la República Mexicana 1900 | 1900 | October 28 |
| Tercer Censo de Población de los Estados Unidos Mexicanos 1910 | 1910 | October 27 |
| Censo General de Habitantes 1921 | 1921 | November 30 |
| Quinto Censo de Población 1930 | 1930 | May 15 |
| Sexto Censo de Población 1940 | 1940 | March 6 |
| Séptimo Censo General de Población 1950 | 1950 | June 6 |
| VIII Censo General de Población 1960 | 1960 | June 8 |
| IX Censo General de Población 1970 | 1970 | January 28 |
| X Censo General de Población y Vivienda 1980 | 1980 | June 4 |
| XI Censo General de Población y Vivienda 1990 | 1990 | March 12 |
| XII Censo General de Población y Vivienda 2000 | 2000 | February 14 |
| Censo de Población y Vivienda 2010 | 2010 | June 12 |
| Censo de Población y Vivienda 2020 | 2020 | March 15 |

== See also ==
- Demographics of Mexico
- List of cities in Mexico
- List of most populous cities in Mexico by decade
