= Martín Zepeda Hernández =

Mexican politician

- Born: 12 January 1967 (age 59); State of Mexico, Mexico
- Occupation: Politician
- Political party: PRD

Martín Zepeda Hernández (born 12 January 1967) is a Mexican politician affiliated with the Party of the Democratic Revolution (PRD). In the 2006 general election he was elected to the Chamber of Deputies In the 2003 mid-terms he was elected to the Chamber of Deputies to represent the State of Mexico's 20th district during the 60th session of Congress.
