= Xaltocan =

Pre-Columbian city-state

Coordinates: 19.417°N 98.2°W

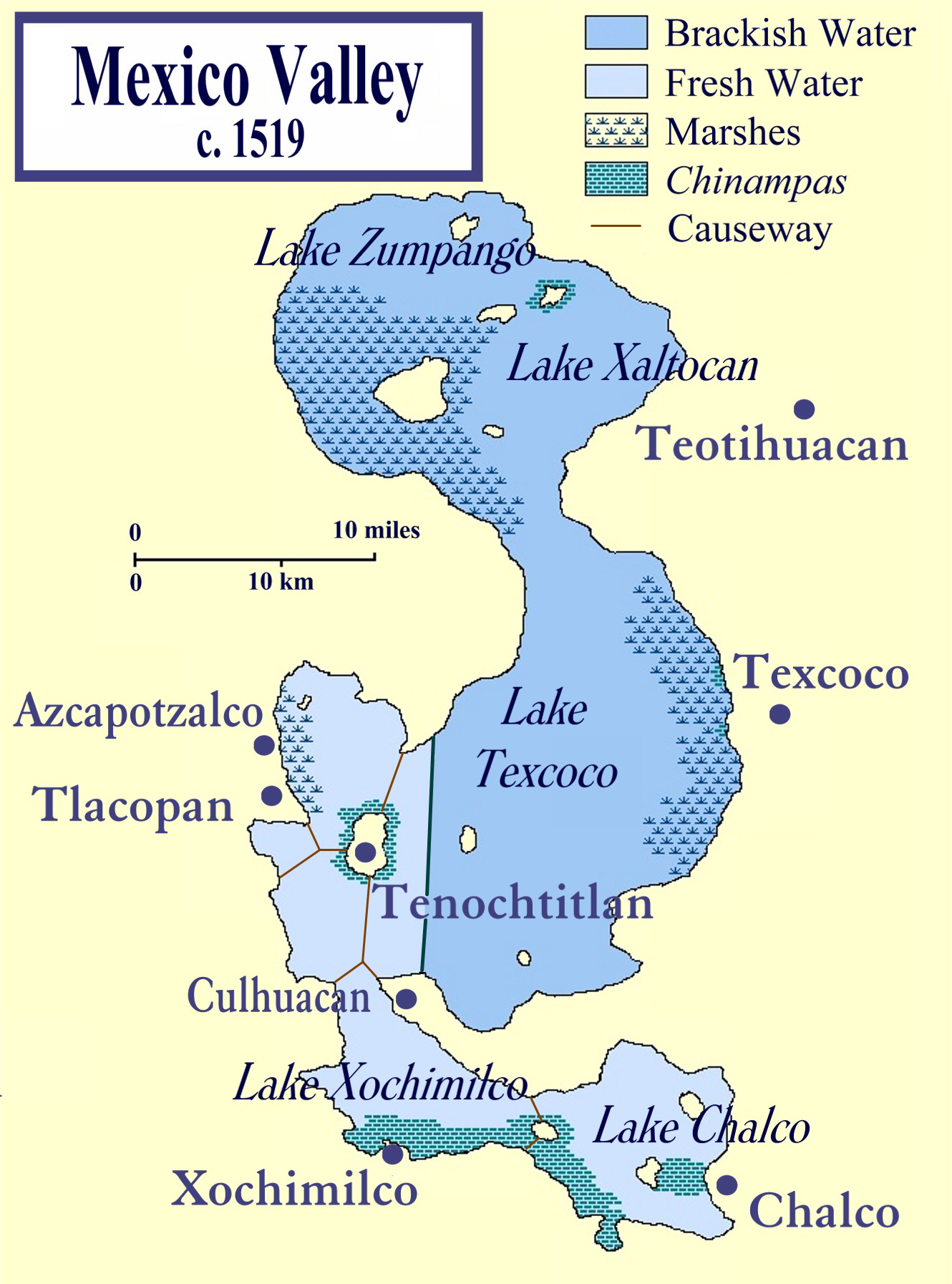
Map of the Valley of Mexico at the time of the Spanish conquest showing the location of lake Xaltocan.

Xaltocan was a pre-Columbian city-state and island in the Valley of Mexico, located in the center of Lake Xaltocan, part of an interconnected shallow lake system which included Lake Texcoco; this place is now inside the village of San Miguel Jaltocan in Nextlalpan, State of Mexico. The site was originally settled by the Otomi people but following a war in the late fourteenth century where the Otomi were defeated by an alliance of Tepanecs and Mexica, the Otomi were driven off the island and relocated to Otumba, Metztitlan and Tlaxcala. The island of Xaltocan was then resettled by Nahuatl speakers. The name can mean either of two things in the Nahuatl language: either 'sandy ground of spiders' or 'where it is planted on the sand'.

== Overview ==
Xaltocan is known to have been inhabited in the Postclassic period. Ceramics and other archaeological remains dating to this period have been recovered in excavations at the site. It is thought to have been a local center of power capable of exacting tribute from other city-states in the area.

The founding of Xaltocan is described in the mytho-historical documents, the Historia Tolteca-Chichimeca and Anales de Cuauhtitlan. According to the Anales the Xaltocameca (people of Xaltocan) were among the Chichimec tribes that left the mythical place of origin, Aztlán, under a leader named Quauhtliztac ("White Eagle"). The Historia also identifies the Xaltocameca as belonging to the Otomi ethnic group. In this document, written by Ixtlilxochitl, the first leader of the Xaltocameca is named Iztacquauhtli, which also means "White Eagle" in Nahuatl. A lunar goddess, perhaps Zäna, was the leading deity of Xaltocan.

Xaltocan's island location gave it certain advantages that other areas would not have had access to, such as making it easier to fortify, however one particularly noteworthy use of Xaltocan's location was to use the lake to create chinampas which played a vital role in the agriculture of Xaltocan. The chinampas would have been used to grow a variety of foods including corn, beans, squash and much more. It's been found that there was a calculable agricultural surplus in Xaltocan.

In the 13th century Xaltocan were involved in a prolonged war with the Nahua city-state of Cuauhtitlan. Xaltocan was initially the strongest but around 1395 the ruler of Cuauhtitlan, Xaltemoctzin, allied himself with Tezozomoc of Azcapotzalco and his subjects the Mexica of Tenochtitlan and finally managed to conquer Xaltocan. The Otomi inhabitants fled north to the Otomian city-state of Metztitlan and to Tlaxcala, while others were allowed to resettle on the lands of Texcoco in the place that was henceforth called Otumba - "Place of the Otomies".

During the next 100 years the site was resettled by Nahua peoples. After the Aztec Triple Alliance defeated the Tepanecs of Azcapotzalco, Xaltocan became an Aztec subject city and paid tribute to Tenochtitlan, mainly in the form of woven blankets. The Aztec resettlement of Xaltocan also caused a breakdown in several of the key institutions that were required to keep the farming in Xaltocan sustainable, this caused the chinampas to eventually be abandoned.

In 1521, during the Spanish conquest of the Aztec Empire, the army of Hernán Cortés razed Xaltocan and burned it to the ground.
