= List of most populous cities in Mexico by decade =

This list tracks and ranks the population of the top 10 largest cities and other urban places in Mexico by decade, as reported by each Mexican Population Census, starting with the 1900 Census.

This list generally refers only to the population of individual localities within their defined limits at the time of the indicated census. Some of these places have since been annexed or merged into other cities, while others may have expanded their borders due to such consolidation. One example is the 1928 integration of several municipalities into Mexico City.

== 1900 ==
There is no information at locality level from the first population census, completed in 1895. At that time, Mexico City was already the most populated city in the country, even if it only covered what is now the Cuauhtémoc borough.

Rank	City	State	Population	
1	Mexico City	Distrito Federal	344,721	First city in Mexico to reach 100,000. Mexico City has ranked as the city with the highest population in every census count.
2	Guadalajara	Jalisco	101,208	Highest ranking. Second city in Mexico to reach 100,000.
3	Puebla	Puebla	93,521	Highest ranking.
4	León	Guanajuato	63,263	Highest ranking.
5	Monterrey	Nuevo León	62,266	
6	San Luis Potosí	San Luis Potosí	61,019	
7	Mérida	Yucatán	43,630	
8	Guanajuato	Guanajuato	41,486	Only appearance in the Top 10.
9	Pachuca	Hidalgo	37,487	Only appearance in the Top 10.
10	Morelia	Michoacán	37,278	

The total population of these 10 cities was 885,879.

== 1910 ==
Rank	City	State	Population	
1	Mexico City	Distrito Federal	471,066	
2	Guadalajara	Jalisco	119,468	
3	Puebla	Puebla	96,121	
4	Monterrey	Nuevo León	78,528	
5	San Luis Potosí	San Luis Potosí	68,022	Highest ranking.
6	Mérida	Yucatán	62,447	
7	León	Guanajuato	57,722	
8	Veracruz	Veracruz	48,683	First appearance in the Top 10.
9	Aguascalientes	Aguascalientes	45,198	First appearance in the Top 10. Would disappear from the Top 10 in the next census.
10	Morelia	Michoacán	40,042	Last appearance in the Top 10.

The total population of these 10 cities was 1,087,297.

== 1921 ==
Because of the Mexican Revolution, the 1920 census was postponed a year.

Rank	City	State	Population	
1	Mexico City	Distrito Federal	615,367	First city in Mexico to reach 500,000.
2	Guadalajara	Jalisco	143,376	
3	Puebla	Puebla	95,535	
4	Monterrey	Nuevo León	88,479	
5	Mérida	Yucatán	79,225	Highest ranking.
6	San Luis Potosí	San Luis Potosí	57,353	
7	Tacubaya	Distrito Federal	54,775	Only appearance in the Top 10. Merged with Mexico City in 1928.
8	Veracruz	Veracruz	54,225	Highest ranking.
9	León	Guanajuato	53,639	
10	Torreón	Coahuila	50,902	First appearance in the Top 10.

The total population of these 10 cities was 1,292,876.

== 1930 ==
Rank	City	State	Population	
1	Mexico City	Distrito Federal	1,029,068	First city in Mexico to reach 1,000,000.
2	Guadalajara	Jalisco	179,556	
3	Monterrey	Nuevo León	132,577	Highest ranking. Third city in Mexico to reach 100,000.
4	Puebla	Puebla	114,793	Fourth city in Mexico to reach 100,000.
5	Mérida	Yucatán	95,015	
6	San Luis Potosí	San Luis Potosí	74,003	
7	León	Guanajuato	69,403	
8	Tampico	Tamaulipas	68,126	First appearance in the Top 10.
9	Veracruz	Veracruz	67,801	Would disappear from the Top 10 in the next census.
10	Torreón	Coahuila	66,001	

The total population of these 10 cities was 1,896,343.

== 1940 ==
Rank	City	State	Population	
1	Mexico City	Distrito Federal	1,448,422	
2	Guadalajara	Jalisco	229,235	
3	Monterrey	Nuevo León	186,092	
4	Puebla	Puebla	138,491	
5	Mérida	Yucatán	98,852	
6	Tampico	Tamaulipas	82,475	Highest ranking. Last appearance in the Top 10.
7	Aguascalientes	Aguascalientes	82,234	Highest ranking. Last appearance in the Top 10.
8	San Luis Potosí	San Luis Potosí	77,161	
9	Torreón	Coahuila	75,796	
10	León	Guanajuato	74,155	

The total population of these 10 cities was 2,492,913.

== 1950 ==
Rank	City	State	Population	
1	Mexico City	Distrito Federal	2,234,795	
2	Guadalajara	Jalisco	377,016	
3	Monterrey	Nuevo León	333,422	
4	Puebla	Puebla	211,331	
5	Mérida	Yucatán	142,858	Fifth city in Mexico to reach 100,000.
6	Torreón	Coahuila	128,971	Highest ranking. Sixth city in Mexico to reach 100,000.
7	San Luis Potosí	San Luis Potosí	125,662	Seventh city in Mexico to reach 100,000.
8	León	Guanajuato	122,726	Eighth city in Mexico to reach 100,000.
9	Ciudad Juárez	Chihuahua	122,566	Ninth city in Mexico to reach 100,000. First appearance in the Top 10. First border city in the list.
10	Veracruz	Veracruz	101,221	Tenth city in Mexico to reach 100,000. Last appearance in the Top 10.

The total population of these 10 cities was 3,900,568.

== 1960 ==
Rank	City	State	Population	
1	Mexico City	Distrito Federal	2,832,133	
2	Guadalajara	Jalisco	736,800	Second city in Mexico to reach 500,000.
3	Monterrey	Nuevo León	596,939	Third city in Mexico to reach 500,000.
4	Puebla	Puebla	289,049	
5	Ciudad Juárez	Chihuahua	262,119	
6	León	Guanajuato	209,870	
7	Torreón	Coahuila	179,901	Highest ranking. Last appearance in the Top 10.
8	Mexicali	Baja California	174,540	Highest ranking. First appearance in the Top 10. Second border city in the list.
9	Mérida	Yucatán	170,834	Last appearance in the Top 10.
10	San Luis Potosí	San Luis Potosí	159,980	Last appearance in the Top 10.

The total population of these 10 cities was 5,612,165.

== 1970 ==
Rank	City	State	Population	
1	Mexico City	Distrito Federal	2,902,969	
2	Guadalajara	Jalisco	1,193,601	Second city in Mexico to reach 1,000,000.
3	Monterrey	Nuevo León	858,107	
4	Ciudad Nezahualcóyotl	State of Mexico	580,436	Fourth city in Mexico to reach 500,000. First appearance in the Top 10. First suburb from Greater Mexico City in the list.
5	Ciudad Juárez	Chihuahua	424,135	
6	Puebla	Puebla	401,603	
7	León	Guanajuato	364,990	
8	Tijuana	Baja California	277,306	First appearance in the Top 10. Third border city in the list. Would disappear from the Top 10 in the next 3 census.
9	Mexicali	Baja California	263,498	Last appearance in the Top 10.
10	Chihuahua	Chihuahua	257,027	Only appearance in the Top 10.

The total population of these 10 cities was 7,523,672.

== 1980 ==
Rank	City	State	Population	
1	Mexico City	Distrito Federal	8,831,079	All 16 boroughs of Distrito Federal consolidated into Mexico City after the 1970 census.
2	Guadalajara	Jalisco	1,626,152	
3	Ciudad Nezahualcóyotl	State of Mexico	1,341,230	Third city in Mexico to reach 1,000,000. Highest position. First city other than Monterrey or Puebla reaching # 3. Population peaked in this census.
4	Monterrey	Nuevo León	1,084,696	Fourth city in Mexico to reach 1,000,000.
5	Tlalnepantla	State of Mexico	778,173	Fifth city in Mexico to reach 500,000. First appearance in the Top 10. Second suburb from Greater Mexico City in the list. Population peaked in this census.
6	Puebla	Puebla	772,908	
7	Ecatepec	State of Mexico	741,821	Sixth city in Mexico to reach 500,000. First appearance in the Top 10. Third suburb from Greater Mexico City in the list.
8	Naucalpan	State of Mexico	723,723	Seventh city in Mexico to reach 500,000. First appearance in the Top 10. Fourth suburb from Greater Mexico City in the list.
9	León	Guanajuato	593,002	Eighth city in Mexico to reach 500,000.
10	Ciudad Juárez	Chihuahua	544,496	Ninth city in Mexico to reach 500,000.

The total population of these 10 cities was 17,037,280.

== 1990 ==
Rank	City	State	Population	
1	Mexico City	Distrito Federal	8,235,744	
2	Guadalajara	Jalisco	1,650,042	Population peaked in this census.
3	Ciudad Nezahualcóyotl	State of Mexico	1,255,456	
4	Ecatepec	State of Mexico	1,218,135	Fifth city in Mexico to reach 1,000,000.
5	Monterrey	Nuevo León	1,068,996	
6	Puebla	Puebla	1,007,170	Sixth city in Mexico to reach 1,000,000.
7	Naucalpan	State of Mexico	845,960	Highest ranking.
8	Ciudad Juárez	Chihuahua	789,522	
9	León	Guanajuato	758,279	
10	Tlalnepantla	State of Mexico	702,270	Last appearance in the Top 10.

The total population of these 10 cities was 17,531,574.

== 2000 ==
Rank	City	State	Population	
1	Mexico City	Distrito Federal	8,605,239	
2	Guadalajara	Jalisco	1,646,183	
3	Ecatepec	State of Mexico	1,621,827	
4	Puebla	Puebla	1,271,673	
5	Ciudad Nezahualcóyotl	State of Mexico	1,225,083	
6	Ciudad Juárez	Chihuahua	1,187,275	Sixth city in Mexico to reach 1,000,000.
7	Tijuana	Baja California	1,148,681	Seventh city in Mexico to reach 1,000,000.
8	Monterrey	Nuevo León	1,110,909	First time outside the Top 5.
9	León	Guanajuato	1,020,818	Eighth city in Mexico to reach 1,000,000.
10	Naucalpan	State of Mexico	943,004	Last appearance in the Top 10. Population peaked in this census.

The total population of these 10 cities was 19,780,692.

== 2010 ==
Rank	City	State	Population	
1	Mexico City	Distrito Federal	8,851,080	
2	Ecatepec	State of Mexico	1,655,015	First city other than Guadalajara reaching # 2. Population peaked in this census.
3	Guadalajara	Jalisco	1,495,182	
4	Puebla	Puebla	1,434,062	
5	Ciudad Juárez	Chihuahua	1,321,004	Highest ranking.
6	Tijuana	Baja California	1,300,983	
7	León	Guanajuato	1,238,962	
8	Zapopan	Jalisco	1,142,483	First appearance in the Top 10. First suburb of Greater Guadalajara in the list.
9	Monterrey	Nuevo León	1,135,512	
10	Ciudad Nezahualcóyotl	State of Mexico	1,104,585	

The total population of these 10 cities was 20,678,868.

== 2020 ==
Rank	City	State	Population	
1	Mexico City	Mexico City	9,209,944	
2	Tijuana	Baja California	1,810,645	Highest ranking.
3	Ecatepec	State of Mexico	1,643,623	
4	León	Guanajuato	1,579,803	
5	Puebla	Puebla	1,542,232	
6	Ciudad Juárez	Chihuahua	1,501,551	
7	Guadalajara	Jalisco	1,385,629	First time outside the Top 5.
8	Zapopan	Jalisco	1,257,547	
9	Monterrey	Nuevo León	1,142,952	
10	Ciudad Nezahualcóyotl	State of Mexico	1,072,676	

The total population of these 10 cities was 22,146,602.

== See also ==
- List of cities in Mexico
- Metropolitan areas of Mexico
- List of Mexican states by population
- Demographics of Mexico
