= San Miguel Jaltocan =

- Town
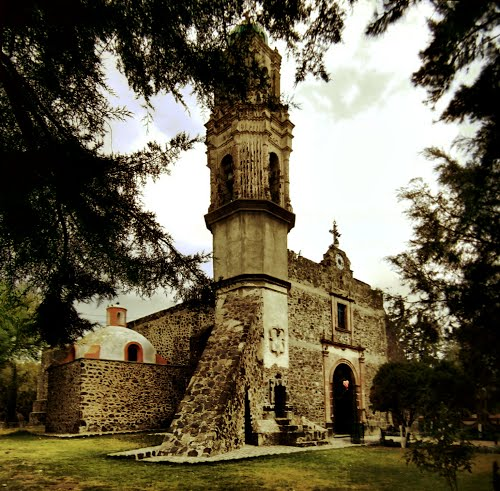
- Church of San Miguel Jaltocan

- Location in Mexico
- Coordinates: 19°43′N 99°3′W
- Country: Mexico
- State: Mexico State
- Municipality: Nextlalpan

Population (2010)
  - Total: 3 681

San Miguel Jaltocan is a town of Nextlalpan, in the state of Mexico State, north of Mexico Valley.

== See also ==
- Xaltocan
