= Lionel Funes Díaz =

Mexican politician

- Born: 1 July 1968 (age 57); State of Mexico, Mexico
- Occupation: Politician
- Political party: PAN

Lionel Funes Díaz (born 1 July 1968) is a Mexican politician from the National Action Party (PAN). In the 2000 general election he was elected to the Chamber of Deputies to represent the State of Mexico's 20th district during the 58th session of Congress. He had previously served in the 53rd session of the Congress of the State of Mexico.
