= José Luis Naranjo y Quintana =

Mexican politician

- Born: 26 August 1944 (age 81); Ciudad Nezahualcóyotl, State of Mexico, Mexico
- Occupation: Politician
- Political party: PRD

José Luis Naranjo y Quintana (born 26 August 1944) is a Mexican politician affiliated with the Party of the Democratic Revolution (PRD).In the 2003 mid-terms he was elected to the Chamber of Deputies to represent the State of Mexico's 20th district during the 59th session of Congress.
