= Martha Patricia Bernal =

Mexican politician (born 1965)

- Born: 29 November 1965 (age 60); State of Mexico, Mexico
- Occupation: Politician
- Political party: PRI

Martha Patricia Bernal Díaz (born 29 November 1965) is a Mexican politician from the Institutional Revolutionary Party (PRI). In 2012, she served in the Chamber of Deputies for the State of Mexico's 20th district as the alternate of Jesús Ricardo Enríquez Fuentes.
