= Conteo de Población y Vivienda =

Mexican national census

The Conteo de Población y Vivienda (Count of Population and Housing) is a national census compiled by the government of Mexico, conducted between the more comprehensive national general censuses (Censo General de Población y Vivienda). Like the general census, the Conteo is conducted every ten years, in a year ending in 5, while the censo general is conducted in years ending in 0. The first conteo was conducted in 1995, and the second in 2005, conducted between the last Censo General in 2000 and the next scheduled census in 2010.

The responsibility for designing and carrying out the Conteo and the Censo General lies with Maxico's national statistics agency, INEGI (Instituto Nacional de Estadística, Geografía e Informática).
