= San Pablo de las Salinas =

Town in State of Mexico, Mexico

Coordinates: 19°39′56″N 99°05′30″W

San Pablo de las Salinas is an exclave and the second-largest colonia in Tultitlán Municipality in the State of Mexico, Mexico. The neighborhood is part of the Mexico City metropolitan area and had a 2010 census population of 189,453 inhabitants, or 36.15% of the municipal population.

The town lies near the northern tip of Mexico City. It is the third-largest locality in Mexico that is not a municipal seat (after Ojo de Agua, Tecámac Municipality, and Buenavista, also in Tultitlán Municipality).
