= Joaquina Navarrete Contreras =

Mexican politician

- Born: 3 August 1966 (age 60); Acambay, State of Mexico, Mexico
- Occupation: Politician
- Political party: PRD

Joaquina Navarrete Contreras (born 3 August 1966) is a Mexican politician affiliated with the Party of the Democratic Revolution (PRD). In the 2012 general election she was elected to the Chamber of Deputies to represent the State of Mexico's 20th district during the 62nd session of Congress.
