= Nextlalpan =

- Municipality
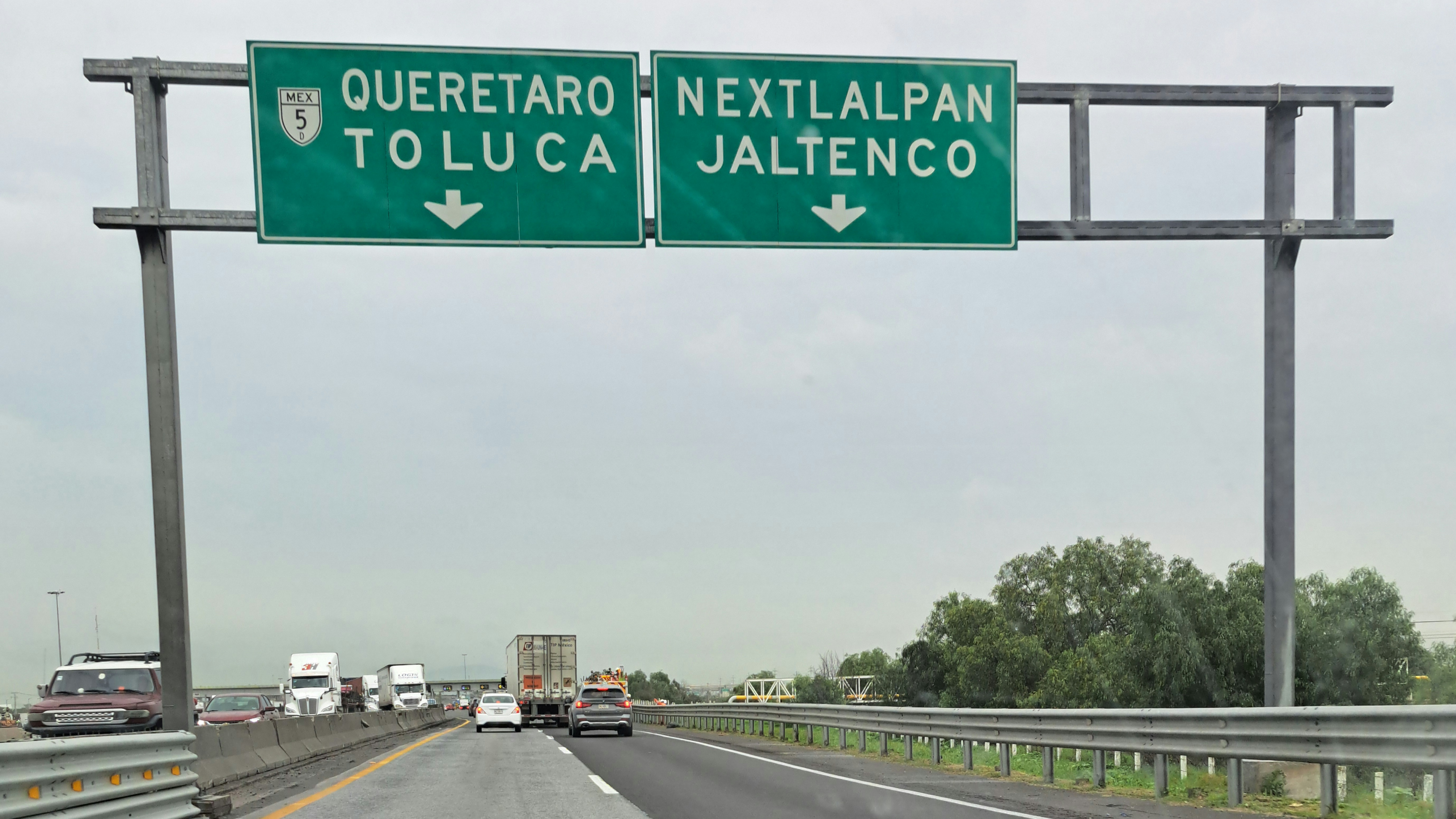
- Highway in Nextlalpan

- Location in Mexico
- Coordinates: 19°43′N 99°04′W
- Country: Mexico
- State: Mexico (state)
- Municipal seat: Santa Ana Nextlalpan

Area
  - Total: 42.49 km^{2} (16.41 sq mi)

Population (2005)
  - Total: 22,507
- Time zone: UTC-6 (Central Standard Time)
- Postal code: 55790
- Area code: 591
- Website: Official website

Nextlalpan is a municipality in the State of Mexico in Mexico. The municipality covers an area of 42.49 km^{2} (16.41 sq mi). Its municipal seat is the town of Santa Ana Nextlalpan.

As of 2005, the municipality had a total population of 22,507.

== Politics ==
Mayor	Period
Joel González Cervantes	2000-2003
Apolinar Guzmán Suárez	2003-2006
Juan Carlos Márquez Castillo	2006-2009
Francisco Zavala Carmona	2009-2012
Sergio Juárez Briones	2013-2015
Ángel Adriel Negrete Avonce	2015-2018

== See also ==
- San Miguel Jaltocan, a town in the municipality
