= Santa Ana Nextlalpan =

Santa Ana Nextlalplan
- Town
- Location in Mexico
- Coordinates: 19°45′0″N 99°10′16″W
- Country: Mexico
- State: Mexico (state)
- Time zone: UTC-6 (Central Standard Time)

Santa Ana Nextlalplan is a town of Nextlalpan municipality in Mexico State in Mexico.
