= Ecatepec Region =

Ecatepec Region Región Ecatepec
- Region
- Country: Mexico
- State: State of Mexico
- Capital and largest city: Ecatepec
- Main cities: 5: Acolman; Ecatepec; Otumba; Tecámac; Temascalapa

Area
  - Total: 1,332 km^{2} (514 sq mi)

Population (2020)
  - Total: 2,571,454
  - Density: 1,931/km^{2} (5,000/sq mi)
- Time zone: UTC−6 (CST)

Region V (Spanish: Región V. Ecatepec) is an intrastate region within the State of Mexico. It lies to the north of Mexico City in the Valley of Mexico, borders the state of Hidalgo, and the whole region is one of 10 regions in the state which comprise the Metropolitan Area of the Valley of Mexico, but the least populated least dense and furthest municipality is not included in the definition of Mexico City Metropolitan Area (see Greater Mexico City). The region comprises five cities, Ecatepec de Morelos, Otumba, Tecámac, Temascalapa, and Acolman.

Municipality	Area (km^{2}) 2010	Population 2010 Census	Population density (/km^{2} 2010)
Acolman	86.88	136,558	1,587/km^{2}
Axapusco	260.01	25,559	98/km^{2}
Ecatepec de Morelos	160.17	1,656,107	10,259/km^{2}
Nopaltepec	208.8	8,895	42/km^{2}
Otumba	143.42	34,232	240/km^{2}
San Martín de las Pirámides	67.22	24,851	370/km^{2}
Tecámac	157	364,579	2,318/km^{2}
Temascalapa	168.26	35,987	214/km^{2}
Teotihuacán	83.16	53,010	638/km^{2}
Region V Ecatepec	1332	2,339,778	1750/km^{2}
