= 1895 Mexican census =

First Census of United Mexican States
- October 20, 1895
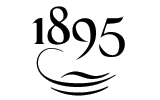
- Census Logo

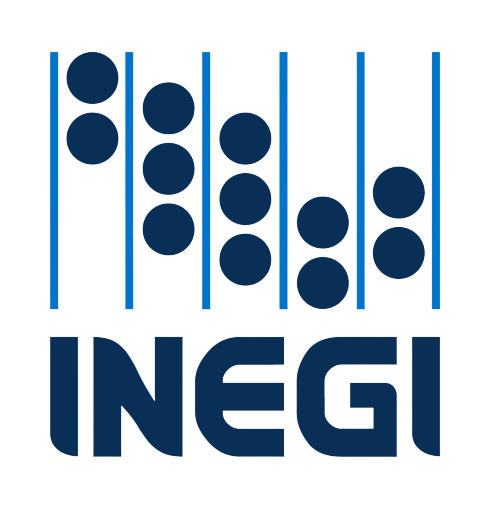
- National Institute of Statistic and Geography Logo

General information
- Country: Mexico

Results
- Total population: 12,700,294
- Most populous state: Jalisco; 1,114,765
- Least populous state: Baja California Territory; 42,875

The 1895 Mexico Census was the first census that took place in Mexico (excluding the 1793 Census which has been lost). It took place on October 20, 1895, and the total population was 12,700,294. The results also showed that most Mexicans were Catholic.

== State populations ==
State	Population
Jalisco	1,114,765
Guanajuato	1,069,418
Puebla	992,426
Michoacán	898,809
Oaxaca	897,182
Veracruz	863,220
Mexico	842,873
San Luis Potosí	571,420
Hidalgo	563,824
Federal District	474,860
Zacatecas	456,241
Guerrero	420,926
Chiapas	320,694
Nuevo León	311,665
Yucatán	298,569
Durango	296,979
Chihuahua	265,546
Sinaloa	261,050
Coahuila	242,021
Querétaro	232,305
Tamaulipas	209,106
Sonora	192,721
Tlaxcala	168,358
Morelos	159,123
Tepic Territory	149,807
Tabasco	134,956
Aguascalientes	104,693
Campeche	88,144
Colima	55,718
Baja California Territory	42,875

== Languages in Mexico ==
83.3% of the resident population spoke Spanish with the remainder of the population mostly speaking Indigenous languages. The most widely spoken indigenous languages were Nahuatl and Mayan. The most widely spoken European language besides Spanish was English.

Languages of Mexico in 1895
Language	Speaking population
Castilian	10,573,874
Nahuatl	649,853
Mayan	249,524
Zapotec	231,124
Otomi	189,745
Mixtecan	146,179
Totonac	77,022
Mazahua	59,597
English	13,132
French	3,440
German	2,171
Italian	1,305

== Immigration ==
Immigrant population in Mexico in 1895
Country	Total population	Male	Female
Guatemala	13,992	7,337	6,655
Spain	13,740	11,079	2,661
United States	12,268	7,499	4,769
France	3,756	2,751	1,005
England	3,172	2,391	781
Germany	2,421	1,947	474
Italy	2,070	1,440	630
China	1,023	996	27

== See also ==
- Demographics of Mexico
