= Temascalapa =

- Municipality
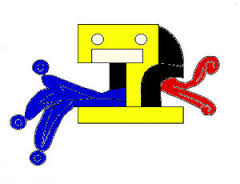
- Coat of arms

- Location within State of Mexico Location within Mexico
- Coordinates: 19°48′N 98°54′W
- Country: Mexico
- State: Mexico (state)
- Municipal seat: Temascalapa

Area
  - Total: 168.26 km^{2} (64.97 sq mi)
- Elevation: 2,249 m (7,379 ft)

Population (2005)
  - Total: 33,063
- Time zone: UTC-6 (Central Standard Time)

Temascalapa is a city in the State of Mexico in Mexico. It serves as the municipal seat for the surrounding municipality of the same name. It is located to the north of Mexico City and in the west of the municipality, close to the border with the state of Hidalgo and connected with the city of Tizayuca by land. This locality was formerly known as San Francisco Temascalapa.

The municipality covers an area of 168.26 km^{2}. As of 2005, the municipality had a total population of 33,063.

The region is noted for drug cartel activity after the death of Netflix's location scout, Carlos Muñoz Portal, for the TV Series Narcos: Mexico, who was found dead in his car with multiple gunshot wounds on September 15, 2017.

Martha Rodríguez Martínez, a member of the Temascalapa city council, died on January 31, 2021, after being run over by a tractor-trailer that refused to stop while the mayor carried out an awareness-raising operation about health measures related to the COVID-19 pandemic in Mexico.

== See also ==
- Ecatepec Region
