= 2020 Mexican census =

- 27 March 2020

General information
- Country: Mexico
- Authority: INEGI
- Website: censo2020.mx

Results
- Total population: ▲126,014,024
- Most populous state: State of Mexico (16,992,418)
- Least populous state: Colima (731,391)

The 2020 Population and Housing Census (Censo de Población y Vivienda 2020) was the 14th population census conducted in Mexico. It was carried out by the National Institute of Statistics and Geography (INEGI) from 2 to 27 March 2020 and recorded a total of 126,014,024 inhabitants, a growth of 12.5% over the 112.3 million reported in the 2010 census.

== Objective ==
The goal of the 2020 Population and Housing Census was to obtain information on the size, structure and spatial distribution of the population, on its main sociodemographic and cultural variables, and on the characteristics of the nation's housing stock. The data obtained are to be used to allocate government spending, to determine electoral apportionment, to calculate population projections, to set sampling frameworks for household surveys, to quantify poverty and marginalization, to determine the limits of metropolitan areas, and as inputs for demographic research, market analyses, and workforce profiling.

== Method ==
Midnight on 15 March 2020 was selected as the reference time and date for the census. Between 2 and 27 March, a total of almost 147,000 interviewers were deployed across 189,432 inhabited settlements.

A responsible adult was identified at each household, to whom one of two questionnaires was administered, with the responses recorded on dedicated mobile-computing devices. Paper questionnaires were available as a fall-back option, and households where the interviewers were unable to gain access after a third visit were invited to submit their reponses online or via telephone. A label with a QR code was placed on all dwellings where the census had been successfully taken. For most respondents, the 38-question basic basic was used; the extended questionnaire, with 103 questions, was applied to a probabilistic sample of 4 million households. Special operations were used for members of the foreign service and for residents of shelters, hospitals, prisons, etc., and the homeless.

== Questionnaires ==
The 38-question basic questionnaire was intended to ascertain, with respect to each habitual resident of the household, the following details:

- Name.
- Sex.
- Age.
- Relationship to head of household.
- Place of birth
- Self-identification as Afro-Mexican or Afrodescendant
- Health service entitlement.
- Religion.
- Disability: type and degree.
- Ability to speak an Indigenous language.
- Ability to speak the Spanish language.
- Currently in education.
- Highest completed level of education.
- Ability to read and write.
- State or foreign country of residence in 2015.
- Municipality of residence in 2015.
- Reason for relocation.
- Marital status
- Economic activity (employment status).
- Number of live births.
- Number of deceased offspring.

And, with respect to the dwelling:

- Type (house on own plot, house on shared plot, duplex, apartment, etc.)
- Floor type (earth, cement, wood/tile/etc.)
- Number of bedrooms.
- Number of rooms.
- Availability of electricity.
- Availability of mains water.
- Availability of non-mains water
- Equipment for storing water
- Availability of a sanitation system.
- Availability of water in the sanitation system.
- Availability of drainage and discharge site.
- Household appliances and means of transport.
- Information and communications technologies.

The extended questionnaire explored the respondents and their dwellings in greater detail. With respect to the occupants, additional questions inquired into such issues as their nationality, place of birth registration, ability to understand an Indigenous language and self-identification as Indigenous, earnings and other income, travel time to work/school and mode of transport, international migration history, and adequacy of meals. Additional questions about the dwelling covered topics such as roof/wall construction methods, type and location of the food preparation area and fuel used, number of lightbulbs, refuse separation and disposal, ownership (owner-occupier, tenant, etc.), title deeds, mortgages and home loans.

== Results ==
For the census, the INEGI visited 43,903,443 dwellings, of which 35,233,462 (80.3%) were inhabited; the remainder were either uninhabited (built but not currently occupied) or classified as "temporary use": holiday homes, temporary accommodation, etc. Interviews were conducted at 35,219,141 inhabited households (95.5%).

=== Population ===
Of the total recorded population of 126,014,024, the breakdown by sex was 51.2% female and 48.8% male. The median age was 29 years, up from 26 in the 2010 census and 22 in 2000; the state of Chiapas, with a median age of 24, and Mexico City, with 35, represented the extreme cases. The population growth rate was 1.2%, down from 1.4% in 2010. Almost half the population (48.4%) lived in settlements of 100,000 inhabitants or more. There were 50 dependent persons per 100 persons of working age, broken down as 38 aged under 15 and 12 aged 65 and over.

The foreign-born population totalled 1,212,252, with the leading countries being the United States (797,266), Guatemala (56,810) and Venezuela (52,948). Domestically, the state with the highest 2015–2020 net migration rate was Quintana Roo (+6.8%), with Guerrero having the lowest (-42.%).

The census reported 7,364,645 people aged 3 and over who spoke an Indigenous language (6.1%), down from 6.6% in 2010. Of that total, 865,972 (11.8%) could not speak Spanish, against 15.9% in 2010. The highest proportions of Indigenous-language speakers were recorded in Oaxaca (31.2%), Chiapas (28.2%) and Yucatán (23.7%), with Jalisco, Colima, Tamaulipas, Zacatecas, Guanajuato and Aguascalientes reporting totals below 1%. Nahuatl and Maya were the Indigenous languages with the largest numbers of speakers. Of the Indigenous-language speakers, 60.3% lived in settlements of fewer than 2,500 inhabitants. Afro-Mexicans and Afrodescendants numbered 2,576,213 (2% of the total population), and 7.4% of them spoke an Indigenous language.

The illiteracy rate stood at 4.7%, down from 6.9% in 2010 and 9.5% in 2000, and ranged from 26% among those aged 75 and older to 15% among the 15–29 age group. The states with the highest numbers of illiterate inhabitants were Veracruz, Chiapas and the State of Mexico, with Baja California Sur, Colima and Aguascalientes having the lowest. In percentage terms, illiteracy was highest in Chiapas, Guerrero and Oaxaca, and lowest in Mexico City, Nuevo León and Coahuila.

Roman Catholics accounted for 77.7% of the total population (down from 82.7% in 2010). Protestants and Evangelicals totalled 11.2% (against 7.5% in 2010), while 8.1% said they had "no religion" (an increase from 4.7% in the 2010 census).

=== Housing ===
The census results indicated that over half (53.2%) of dwellings had bare concrete floors and 3.5% earthen floors (compared to 55.9% and 6.2% in 2010, respectively), while the proportion of homes with wooden, tiled or otherwise covered floors rose to 40% from 31% in 2010. Earthen floors were most prevalent in Guerrero (14.0%), Oaxaca (13.3%) and Chiapas (11.1%). Electricity was available in 99% of households, and mains water within the dwelling in 77.6%; an additional 18.7% had mains water available in the yard or elsewhere on the property. Up from 72.1% in 2010, 78.1% of homes were connected to public sanitation services.

Refrigerators were reported in 87.6% of households, washing machines in 72.8%, and cars, trucks or vans in 46.5% (up from 82.1%, 66.4%, and 44.2% in 2010). Household Internet availability stood at 52.1% (compared to 21.3% in 2010), while 37.5% of households had a landline telephone (down from 43.2% in the previous census). The penetration of cellular telephony, in contrast, rose to 87.5% from 65.1% in 2010. In 2020, 47.4% of homes had microwave ovens, 43.3% had subscription television services, and 11.8% had videogame consoles.

=== Tabulated data ===
Population
INEGI code	State	Total	Growth rate	Median age	Hab/km²	Speakers Indig. lang. (Note: Aged 3 and over.)
01	Aguascalientes	1,425,607	1.9	27	253.9	2,539
02	Baja California	3,769,020	1.8	30	52.8	49,130
03	Baja California Sur	798,447	2.3	29	10.8	13,581
04	Campeche	928,363	1.2	29	16.1	91,801
05	Coahuila	3,146,771	1.4	29	20.8	5,527
06	Colima	731,391	1.2	30	130.0	5,210
07	Chiapas	5,543,828	1.5	24	75.6	1,459,648
08	Chihuahua	3,741,869	1.0	29	15.1	110,498
09	Mexico City	9,209,944	0.4	35	6,163.3	125,153
10	Durango	1,832,650	1.2	27	14.9	47,242
11	Guanajuato	6,166,934	1.2	28	201.5	14,048
12	Guerrero	3,540,685	0.5	27	55.7	515,487
13	Hidalgo	3,082,841	1.5	30	148.1	362,629
14	Jalisco	8,348,151	1.3	29	106.2	66,963
15	State of Mexico	16,992,418	1.2	30	760.2	417,603
16	Michoacán	4,748,846	0.9	28	81.0	154,943
17	Morelos	1,971,520	1.1	30	404.1	38,110
18	Nayarit	1,235,456	1.3	29	44.4	69,069
19	Nuevo León	5,784,442	2.3	30	90.2	77,945
20	Oaxaca	4,132,148	0.9	28	44.1	1,221,555
21	Puebla	6,583,278	1.3	28	191.9	615,622
22	Querétaro	2,368,467	2.7	29	202.6	31,383
23	Quintana Roo	1,857,985	3.5	28	41.6	204,949
24	San Luis Potosí	2,822,255	0.9	29	46.2	231,213
25	Sinaloa	3,026,943	0.9	30	52.8	35,539
26	Sonora	2,944,840	1.0	30	16.4	62,808
27	Tabasco	2,402,598	0.7	29	97.1	91,025
28	Tamaulipas	3,527,735	0.8	30	44.0	22,651
29	Tlaxcala	1,342,977	1.4	28	336.0	27,174
30	Veracruz	8,062,579	0.5	31	112.3	663,503
31	Yucatán	2,320,898	1.8	30	58.7	525,092
32	Zacatecas	1,622,138	0.9	28	21.5	5,005
Mexico		126,014,024	1.2	29	64.3	7,364,645

Housing
INEGI code	State	Inhabited homes	Have electricity	% with electricity	Have mains water in home	% with mains water	Have fridge	% with fridge	Have tablet or computer	% with tablet or computer
01	Aguascalientes	386,445	384,361	99.46	367,744	95.16	365,189	94.50	177,149	45.84
02	Baja California	1,148,913	1,132,622	98.58	1,063,106	92.53	1,086,226	94.55	576,454	50.17
03	Baja California Sur	240,468	235,285	97.84	196,970	81.91	219,805	91.41	108,948	45.31
04	Campeche	260,725	255,453	97.98	168,344	64.57	218,630	83.86	87,769	33.67
05	Coahuila	900,883	895,921	99.45	832,812	92.45	870,949	96.68	367,970	40.84
06	Colima	226,853	224,634	99.02	209,231	92.23	211,596	93.27	90,200	39.76
07	Chiapas	1,351,023	1,317,473	97.52	705,992	52.26	870,621	64.44	212,970	15.76
08	Chihuahua	1,146,395	1,125,620	98.19	1,071,779	93.49	1,081,646	94.35	488,724	42.63
09	Mexico City	2,756,319	2,746,872	99.66	2,491,496	90.39	2,580,111	93.61	1,649,403	59.84
10	Durango	493,698	483,167	97.87	393,835	79.77	449,272	91.00	169,760	34.38
11	Guanajuato	1,586,531	1,573,803	99.20	1,292,280	81.46	1,464,808	92.33	550,020	34.67
12	Guerrero	942,043	920,890	97.75	463,959	49.25	758,141	80.48	191,317	20.31
13	Hidalgo	857,174	847,206	98.84	572,312	66.77	708,258	82.62	261,093	30.46
14	Jalisco	2,330,706	2,305,305	98.91	2,201,159	94.44	2,207,380	94.71	1,034,977	44.41
15	State of Mexico	4,568,635	4,543,258	99.44	3,426,029	75.00	3,913,160	85.65	1,851,854	40.53
16	Michoacán	1,284,644	1,273,522	99.13	1,004,211	78.17	1,139,678	88.72	374,189	29.12
17	Morelos	560,669	556,409	99.24	369,512	65.88	504,256	89.94	204,850	36.54
18	Nayarit	361,270	353,523	97.86	272,253	75.36	322,557	89.28	125,693	34.79
19	Nuevo León	1,655,256	1,645,742	99.43	1,605,673	97.01	1,595,180	96.37	791,493	47.82
20	Oaxaca	1,125,892	1,093,796	97.15	455,703	40.48	789,838	70.16	228,976	20.32
21	Puebla	1,713,381	1,695,462	98.95	1,026,950	59.94	1,275,842	74.44	505,613	29.51
22	Querétaro	668,487	661,924	99.02	569,045	85.11	611,057	91.40	320,239	47.90
23	Quintana Roo	575,489	562,025	97.66	490,789	85.29	500,455	86.96	213,846	37.16
24	San Luis Potosí	774,658	761,594	98.31	537,993	69.45	679,234	87.68	263,244	33.98
25	Sinaloa	854,816	847,989	99.20	740,739	86.65	810,884	94.86	326,641	38.21
26	Sonora	876,333	864,910	98.70	780,261	89.03	823,651	94.00	380,911	43.47
27	Tabasco	669,303	663,718	99.17	447,097	66.80	578,464	86.42	169,377	25.30
28	Tamaulipas	1,069,121	1,058,620	99.02	954,566	89.29	1,005,517	94.05	380,911	35.63
29	Tlaxcala	341,577	333,902	97.75	240,271	70.31	258,276	75.61	96,501	28.25
30	Veracruz	2,390,726	2,352,018	98.38	1,469,781	61.48	1,949,422	81.54	617,769	25.84
31	Yucatán	658,085	649,791	98.74	513,253	77.99	552,727	83.99	246,448	37.45
32	Zacatecas	442,623	439,161	99.22	342,717	77.40	408,430	92.28	139,371	31.49
Mexico		35,219,141	34,805,976	98.83	27,277,862	77.45	30,811,260	87.48	13,204,680	37.49

== See also ==
- Demographics of Mexico
- Censo General de Población y Vivienda
- Population and housing censuses by country
