= Tecámac =

- Town & Municipality
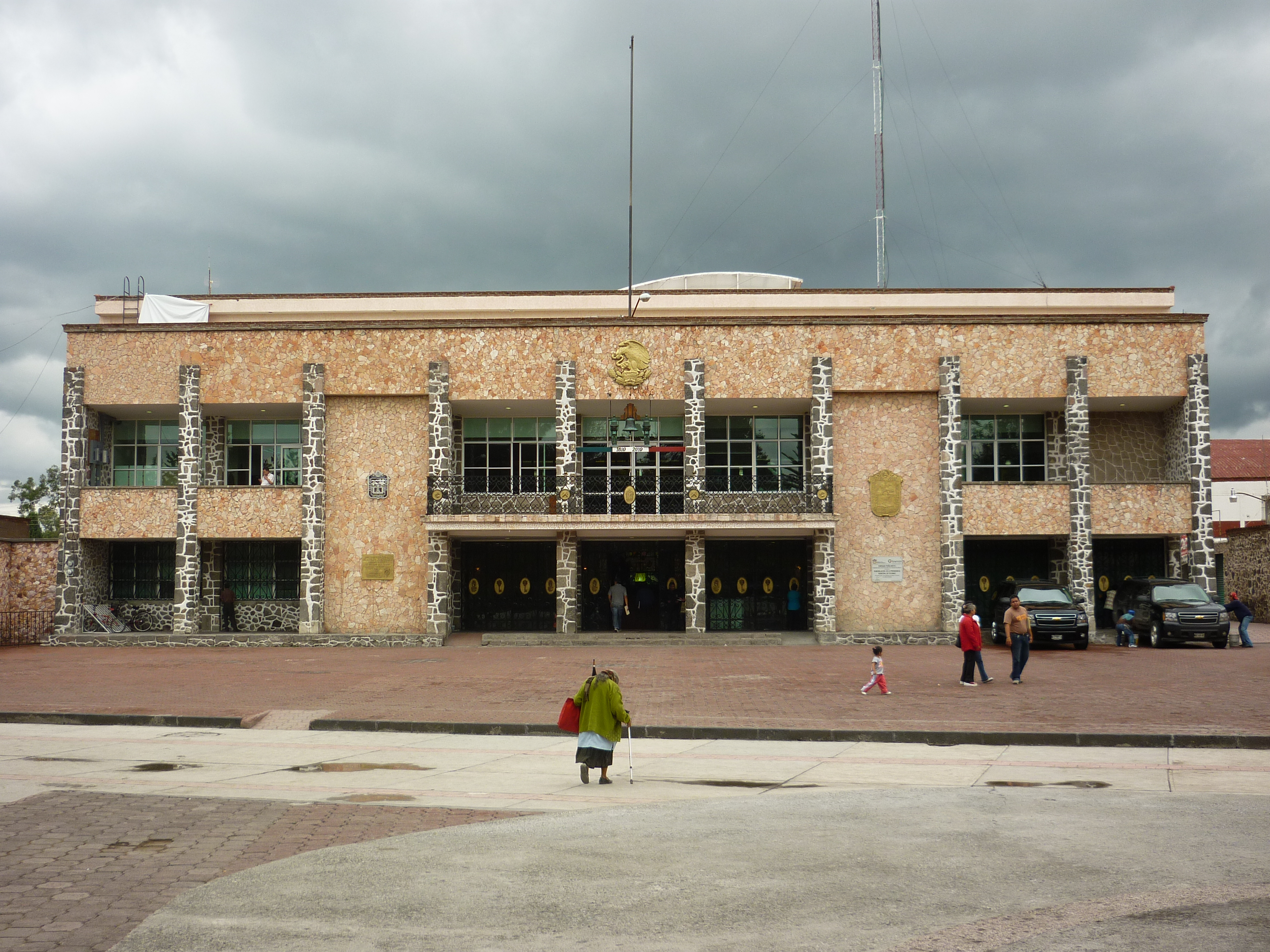
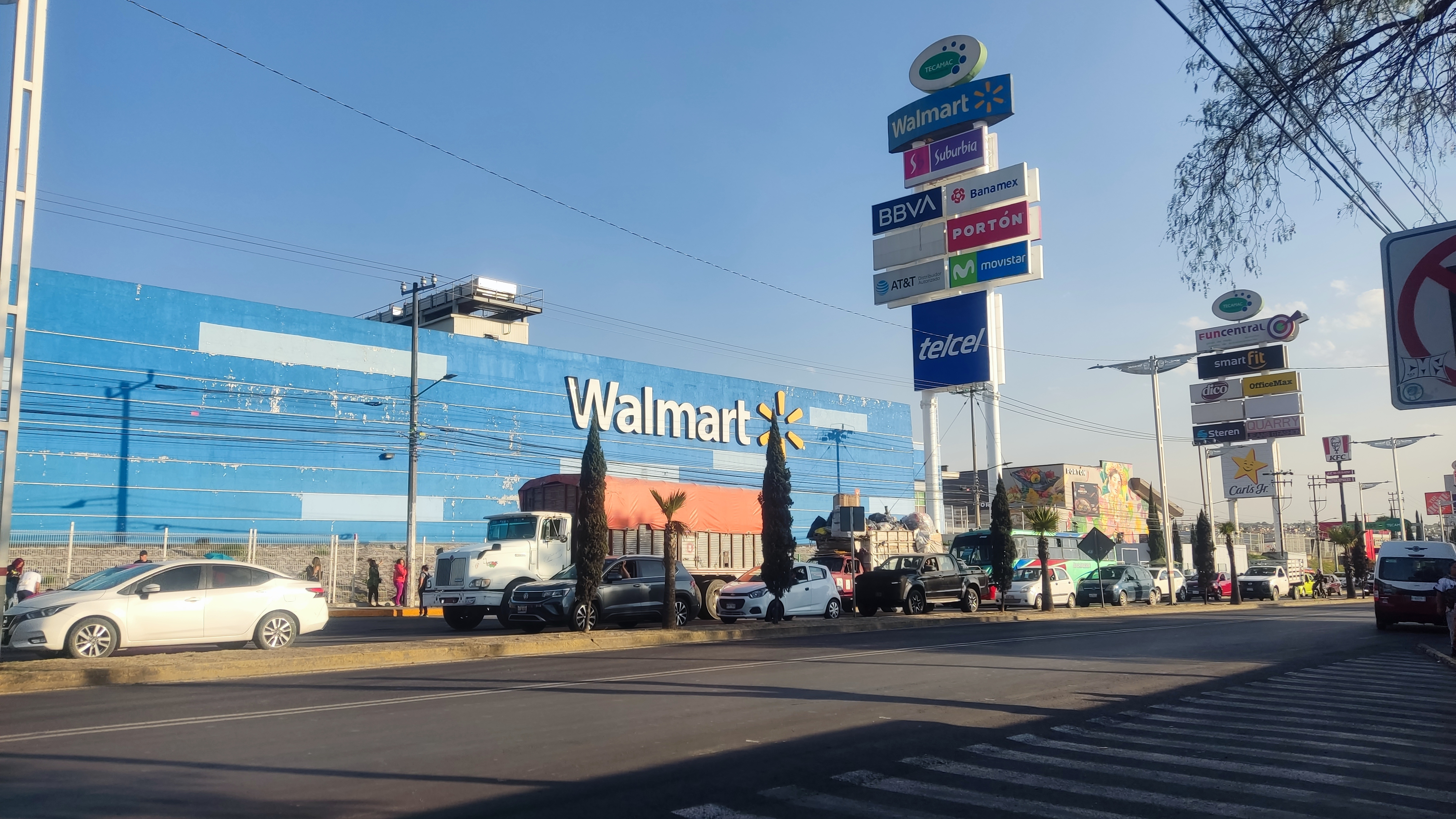
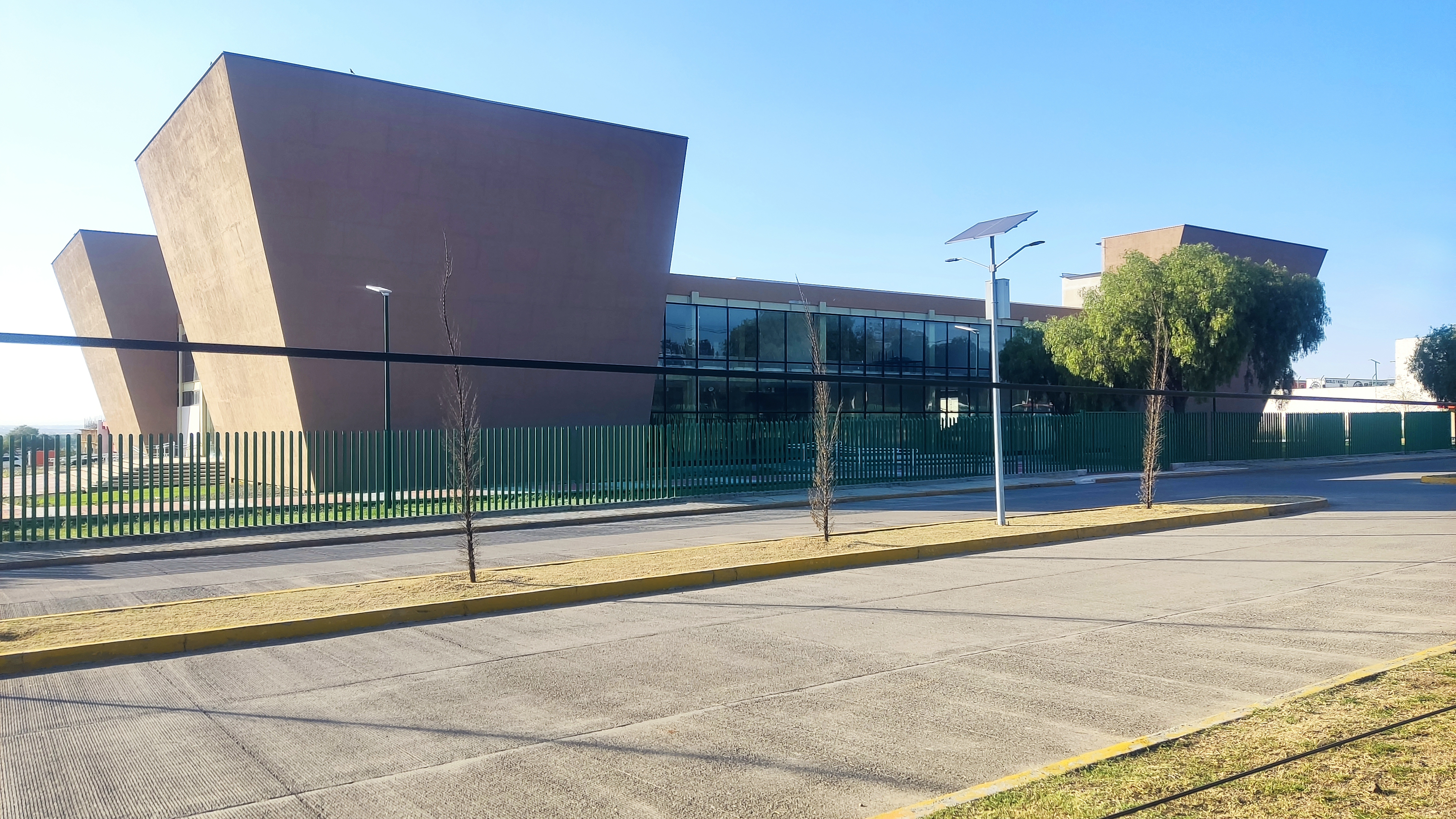
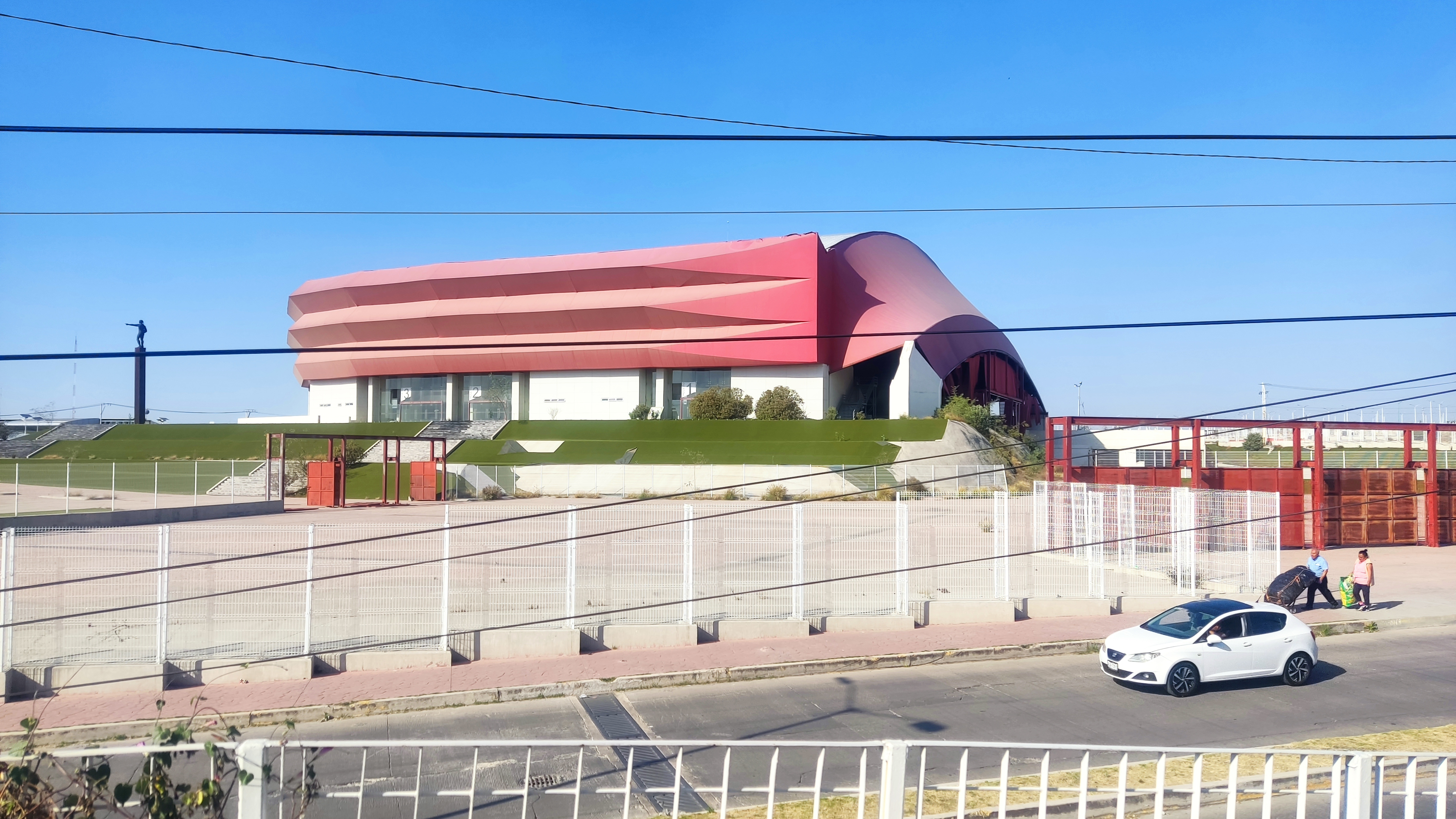
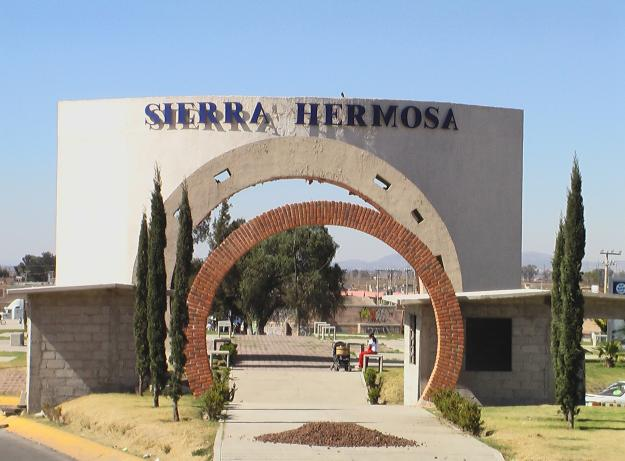
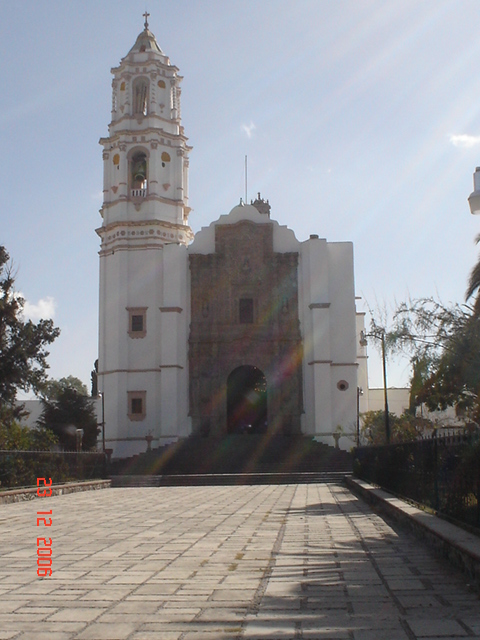
- Clockwise, from top: Municipal palace, Universidad Tecnológica de Tecámac, Sierra Hermosa, Our Lady of Candelaria Parish Church, Auditorio Metropolitano de Tecámac, Tecámac Power Center

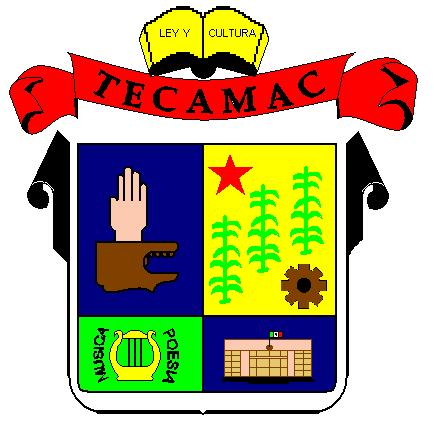
- Coat of arms

- Location of the municipality in Mexico State

- Location in Mexico
- Coordinates: 19°42′47″N 98°58′06″W
- Country: Mexico
- State: State of Mexico
- Region: Ecatepec Region
- Metro area: Greater Mexico City
- Municipal Status: September 12, 1825
- Municipal Seat: Tecámac de Felipe Villanueva

Government
  - Type: Ayuntamiento
  - Municipal President: Rocío Díaz Montoya

Area
  - Total: 157.34 km^{2} (60.75 sq mi)
  - Land: 157.34 km^{2} (60.75 sq mi)
  - Water: 0.00 km^{2} (0 sq mi)
- Elevation: 2,260 m (7,410 ft)

Population (2020)
  - Total: 547,500
- Time zone: UTC-6 (CST)
- Postal code (of seat): 55740
- Area code: 55
- Demonym: Tecamaquense
- Website: Official website (in Spanish)

Tecámac is a municipality in State of Mexico in Mexico. The municipality covers an area of 157.34 km^{2} (60.75 sq mi). The municipal seat lies in the town (locality) of Tecámac de Felipe Villanueva. Its largest town, Ojo de Agua, with a population of 242,283 inhabitants, is the largest locality in Mexico that is not a municipal seat.

As of the 2020 census, the municipality had a total population of 547,500, with most people residing in Ojo de Agua.

== Geography ==
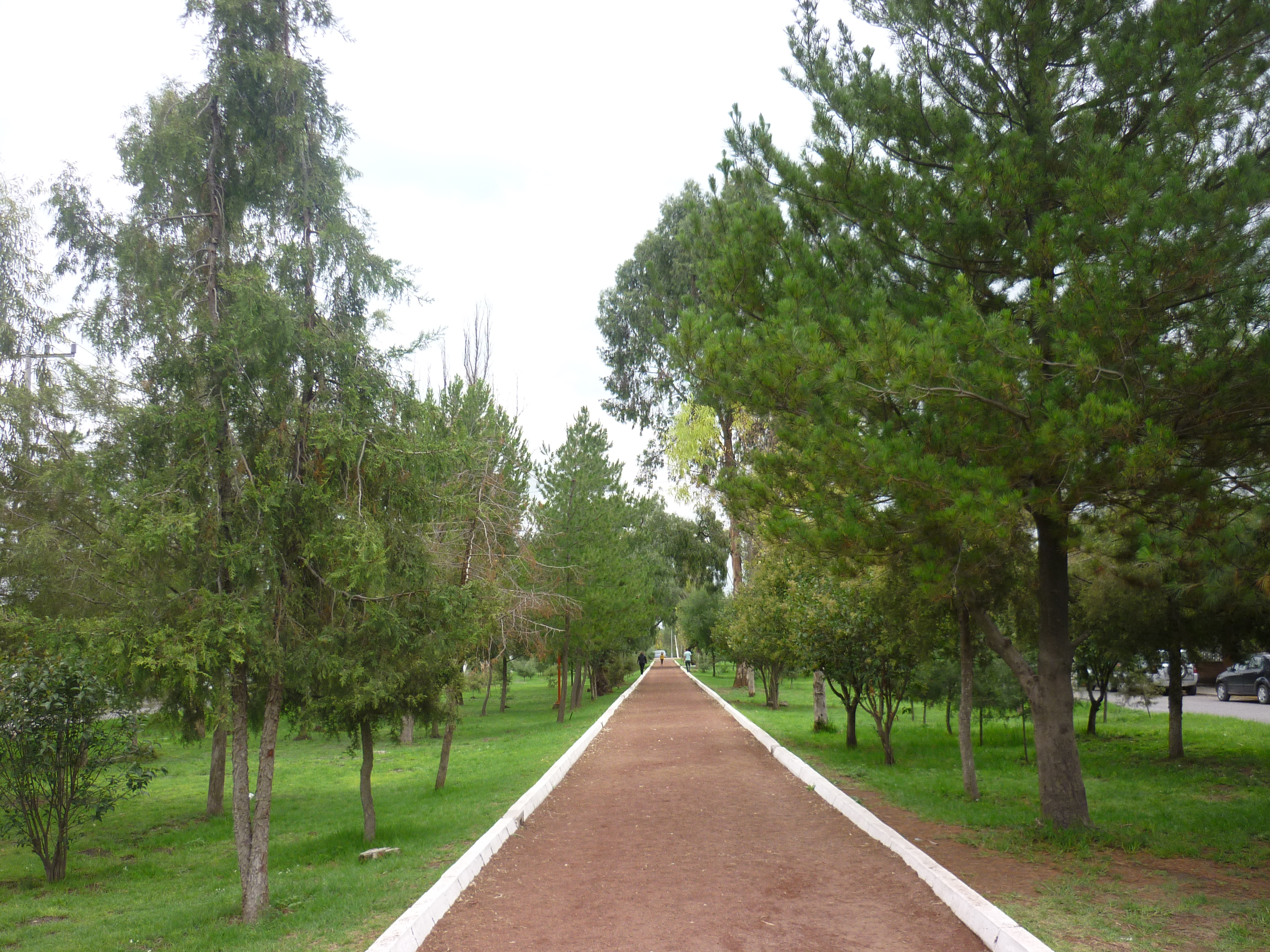
Urban park in Ojo de Agua, Tecámac.

The town of Tecámac de Villanueva, a municipal seat, has governing jurisdiction over the following communities: Ozumbilla, Santa María Ajoloapan, San Lucas Xolox, Los Reyes Acozac and Ojo de Agua. The total municipality extends 157.34 km^{2} and borders with the municipalities of Zumpango, Temascalapa, Tonanitla, Teotihuacán and Ecatepec de Morelos.

== Infrastructure ==
Felipe Ángeles International Airport is located within the municipalities Zumpango and Tecámac.

Tecámac Power Center is an important shopping destination for Tecámac and surrounding municipalities, 812,000 square feet (75,400 m^{2}) in area, anchored by Cinépolis cinemas, FunCentral (entertainment area), Home Depot, Sam's Club, Suburbia, and Walmart.

== Politics ==
Mayor	Time
Aaron Urbina Bedolla	2012–2015
Rocío Díaz Montoya	2016–

== Demography ==
The largest localities (cities, towns, and villages) are:

Populated place	2010 Census Population
Ojo de Agua	242,283
San Martín Azcatepec	35,390
Los Reyes Acozac	21,910
Santa María Ajoloapan	17,784
Tecámac de Felipe Villanueva	15,911
San Lucas Xolox	20,478
Fraccionamiento Social Progresivo Santo Tomás Chiconautla	15,061
Total Municipality	364,590
