= Buenavista, Tultitlán =

Town in State of Mexico, Mexico

Coordinates: 19°36′30″N 99°10′10″W

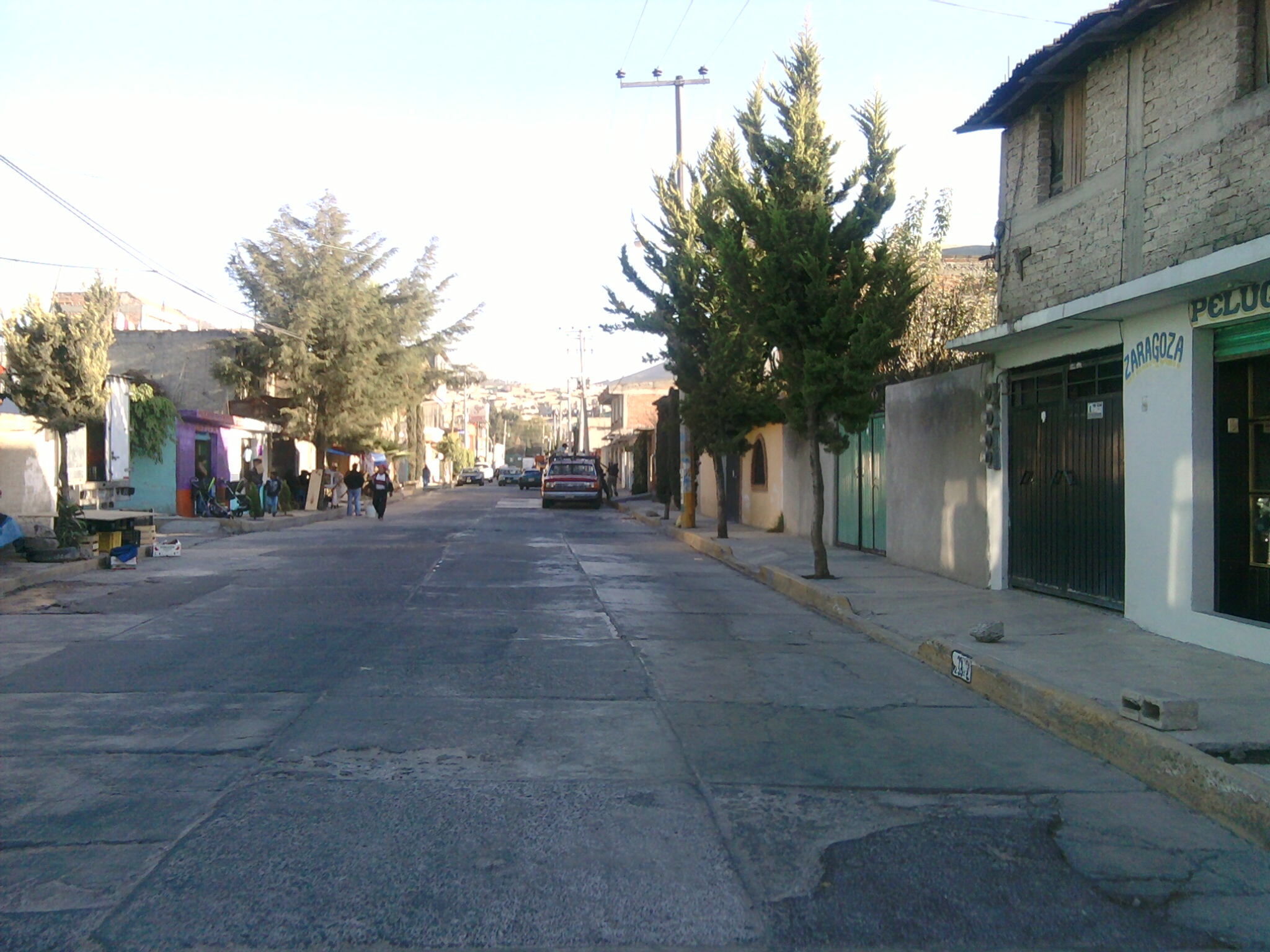
Avenida Pelícanos

Buenavista is the largest colonia in Tultitlán Municipality in State of Mexico, Mexico. The neighborhood is part of the Mexico City metropolitan area and had a 2010 census population of 206,081 inhabitants, or 39.32% of its municipal population of 524,074. It lies near the northern tip of the Federal District (Distrito Federal). It is the second-largest locality in Mexico that is not a municipal seat (after Ojo de Agua, Tecámac Municipality, State of Mexico). Tultitlán Municipality's seat lies in the town of Tultitlán de Mariano Escobedo, with a population of 31,936. As of 2020, the population change soared to 216,776 inhabitants.
