= Ojo de Agua, Tecámac =

Town in State of Mexico, Mexico

- City
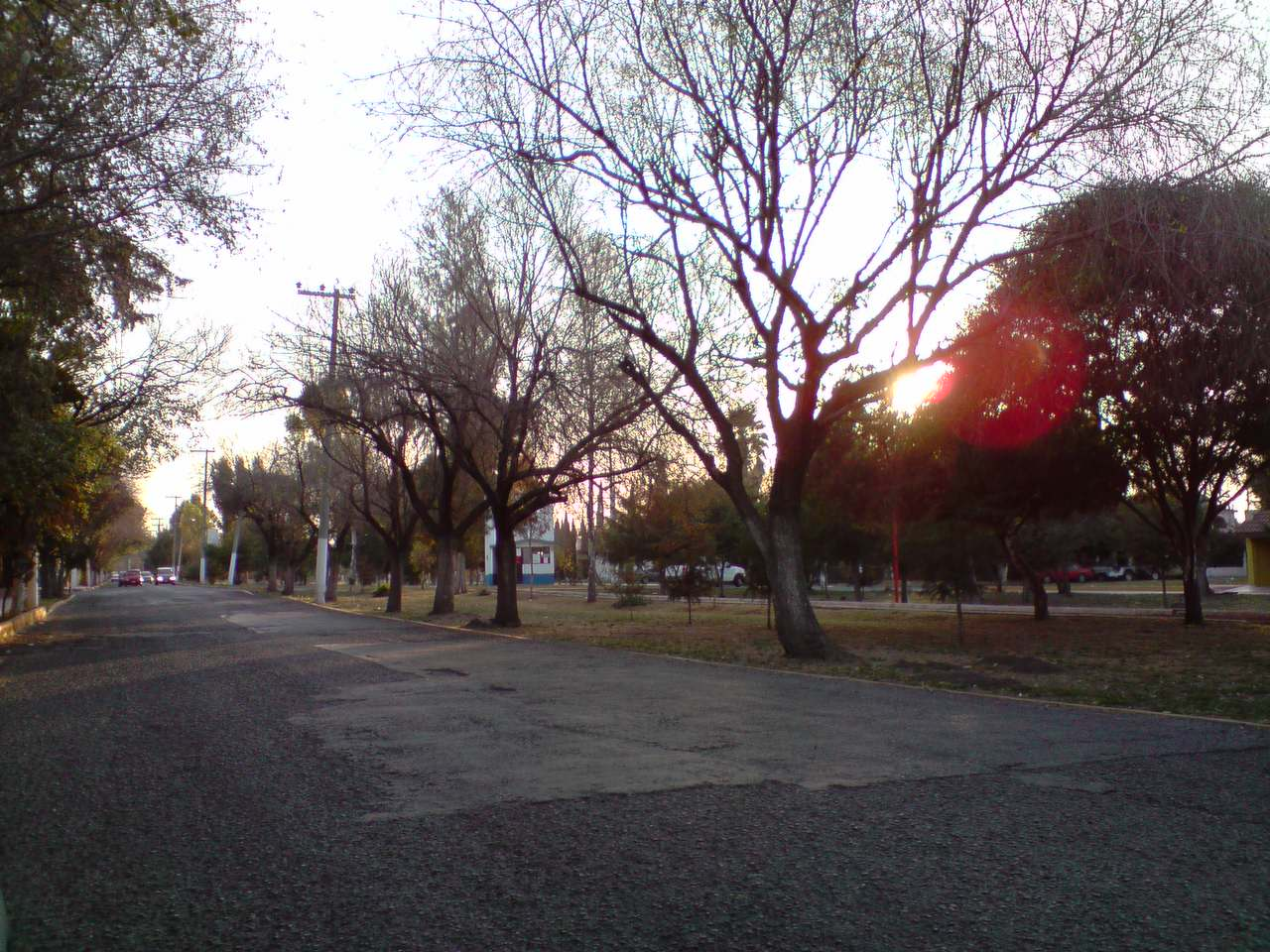
- Boulevard en Ojo de Agua

- Location in the State of Mexico Ojo de Agua, Tecámac (State of Mexico)
- Coordinates: 19°40′49″N 99°0′36″W
- Country: Mexico
- State: Estado de México
- Metro: Greater Mexico City
- Region: Ecatepec Region
- Municipality: Tecámac
- Established: 1585
- Elevation: 2,250 m (7,380 ft)

Population (2020)
  - Total: 386,290
- Time zone: UTC-6 (Central (US Central))

Ojo de Agua is the largest colonia in the municipality of Tecámac in State of Mexico, Mexico. It is located in the northeastern part of the state, northeast of Mexico City and within the Greater Mexico City urban area. It had a population of 386,290 people in the 2020 census. Ojo de Agua is the largest locality in Mexico that is not a municipal seat. (The municipal seat lies in the town of Tecámac de Felipe Villanueva, with a population of 15,911 inhabitants.) Ojo de Agua lies at an elevation of 2,248 m (7,375 ft.) above sea level.
