= Condición suspendida =

Sculpture in Zapopan, Jalisco, Mexico

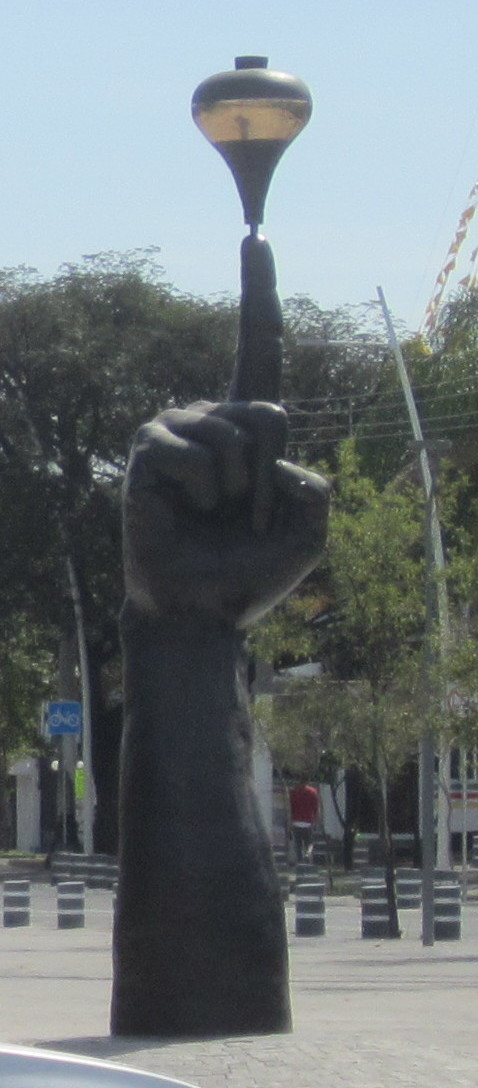
- The sculpture in 2021
- Artist: Gonzalo Lebrija
- Year: 2021
- Dimensions: 5.1 m (17 ft)
- Location: Zapopan, Jalisco, Mexico
- 20°43′12.2″N 103°23′14.4″W

Condición suspendida is an outdoor sculpture by Gonzalo Lebrija, installed in Zapopan, in the Mexican state of Jalisco. It is a 5.1 meters (17 ft) high hand that holds a spinning top with the index finger. It is found outside Zapopan Centro station of the Guadalajara light rail system, in front of the Arcos de Zapopan.
