= Symbols of Zapopan =

The symbols of city of Zapopan, Mexico, are the coat of arms or seal and the municipal flag. Other cultural symbols include the Our Lady of Zapopan and the torta ahogada sandwich.

== Coat of arms ==
Coat of Arms of Zapopan.

The Coat of arms or Seal of Zapopan consists in the shape of the semicircular or semicircular Spanish shield, and is surrounded by a blue border. It contains, in a field of green and a field of gold, a tree also covered with sinople and fruited with seven cherimoyas or golden sapotes; to its reclining trunk a spear shaft with a red flag and behind it, a jumping dog outlined in silver; in place of honor a simple cross of gules, accompanied by a semicircular silver device with the motto: HOC SIGNUM VINCIT (This Sign Wins).

Its bell is a ducal crown of green with a gules background and three natural emeralds. Likewise, large green acanthus leaves run vertically from the bell on both sides, curving towards the center, ending in a lancet shape.

Within such supports three polished spearheads of gules appear, corresponding to the right canton, the center and the sinister canton of the Chief; and under the beard also appears the lower end of a silver spear, edged with gules in the shape of a needle. The lambrequins are of gold and blue alternated.

== Flag ==
Zapopan
- Use: Civil and state flag
- Proportion: 4:7
- Adopted: 2014

The flag of Zapopan was adopted in 2014. It is colored green and gold and bears the city Emblem in the center. The emblem has a diameter of three-quarters the width of the stripes. The ratio of the flag is 4:7. Ribbons of the same colors may be placed at the foot of the finial.

== See also ==
- List of Mexican municipal flags
- Zapopan
- Flag of Jalisco
