= Zapopan =

City and municipality in Jalisco, Mexico

- City and municipality
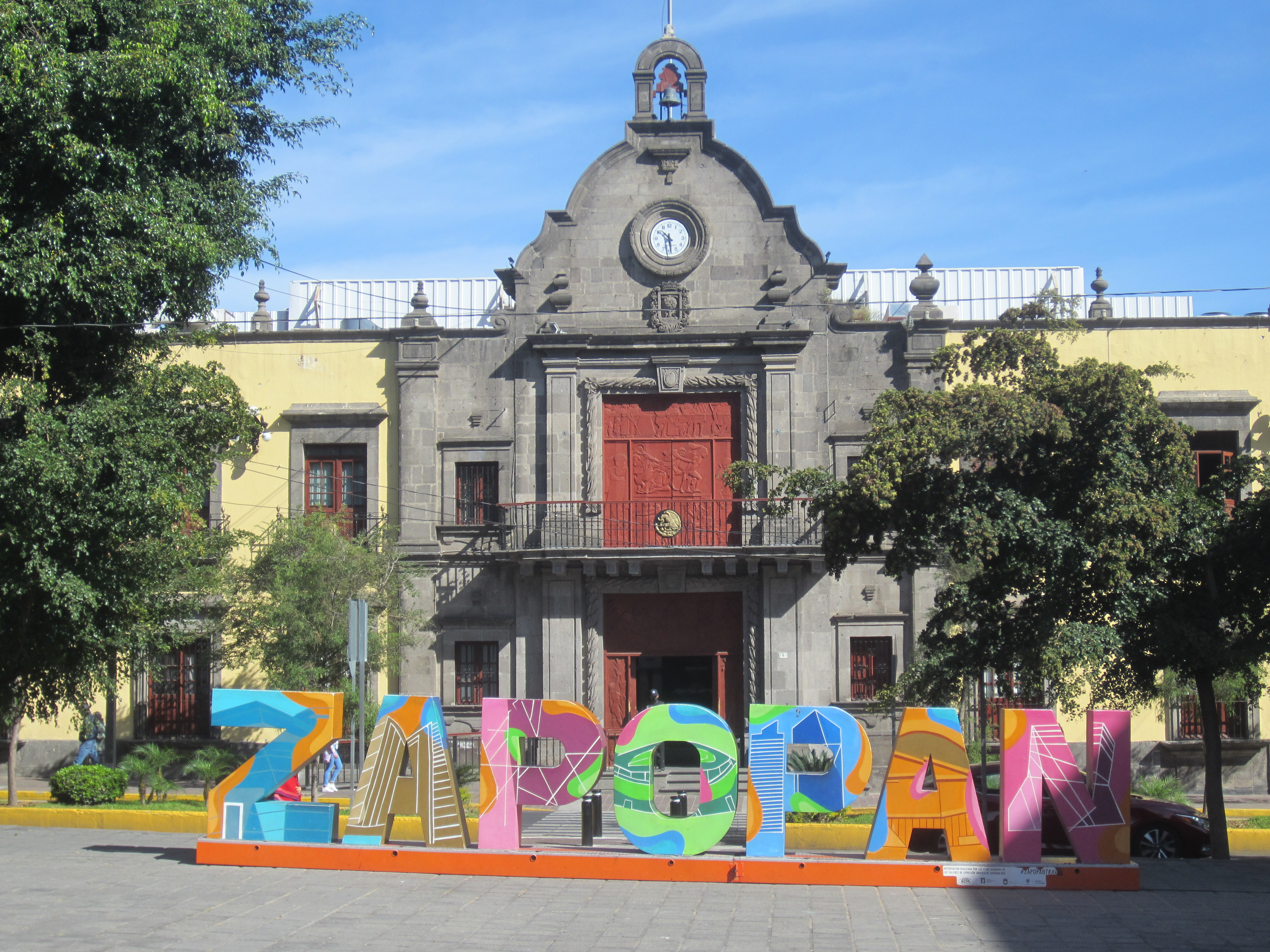
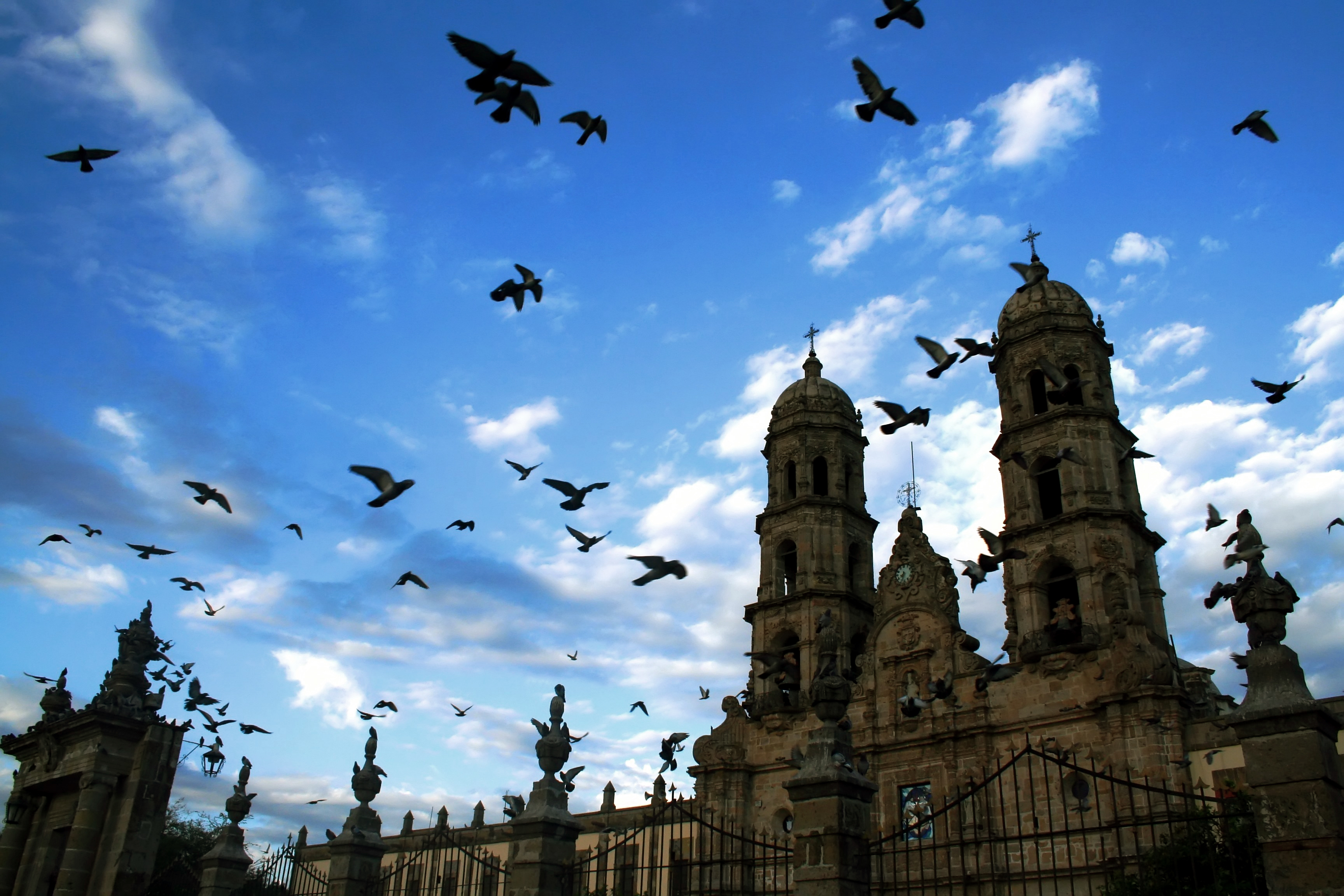
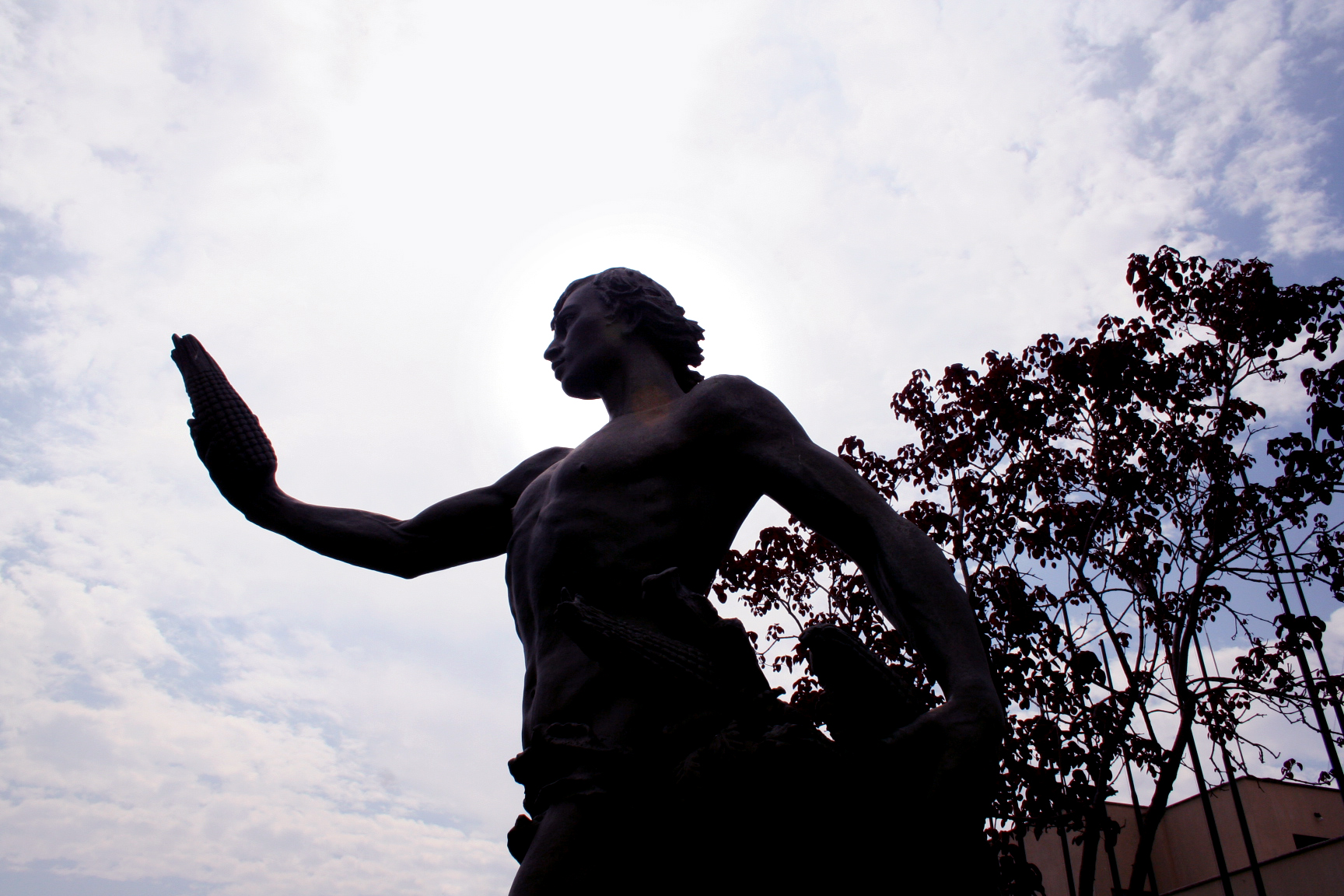
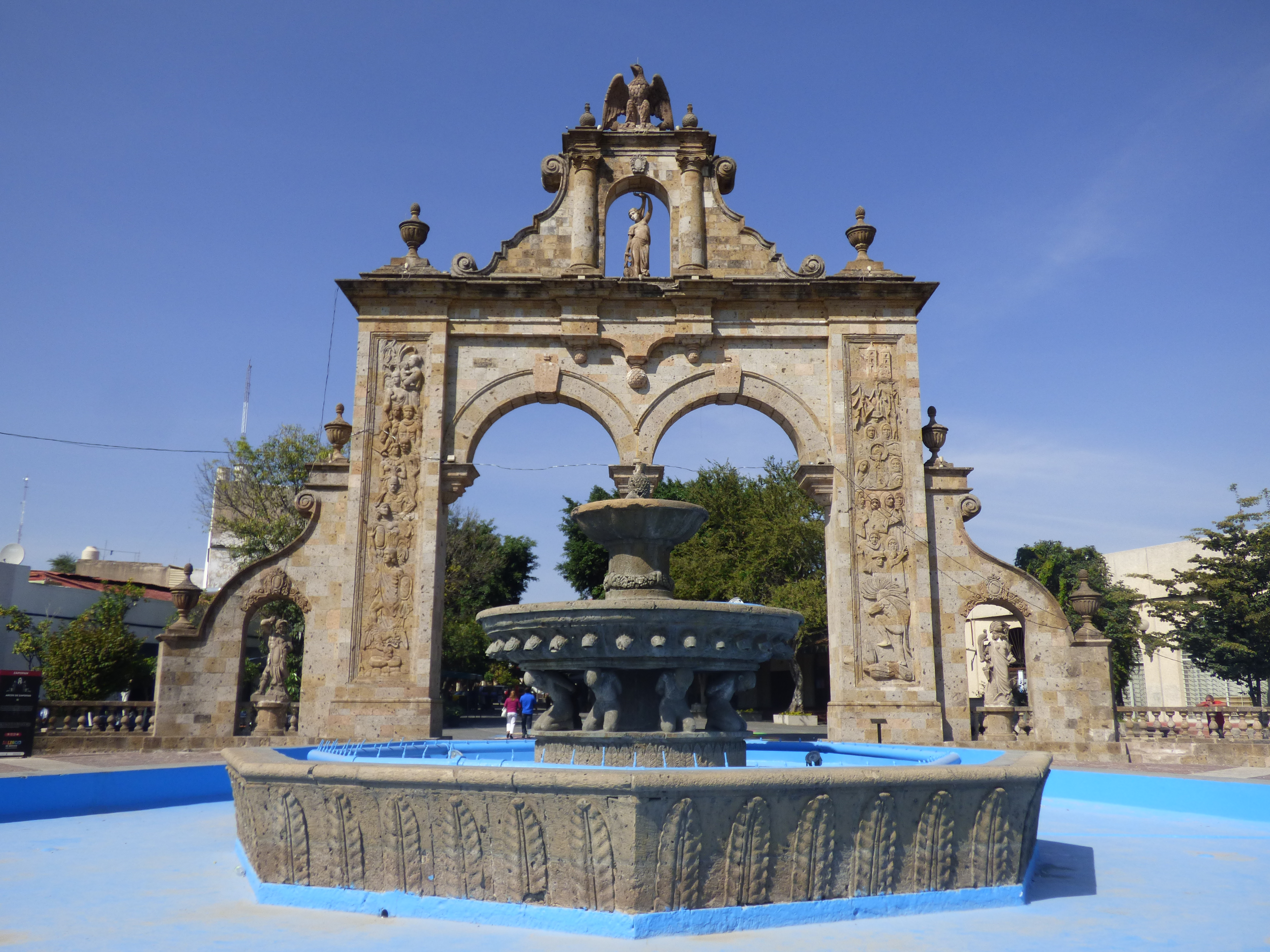
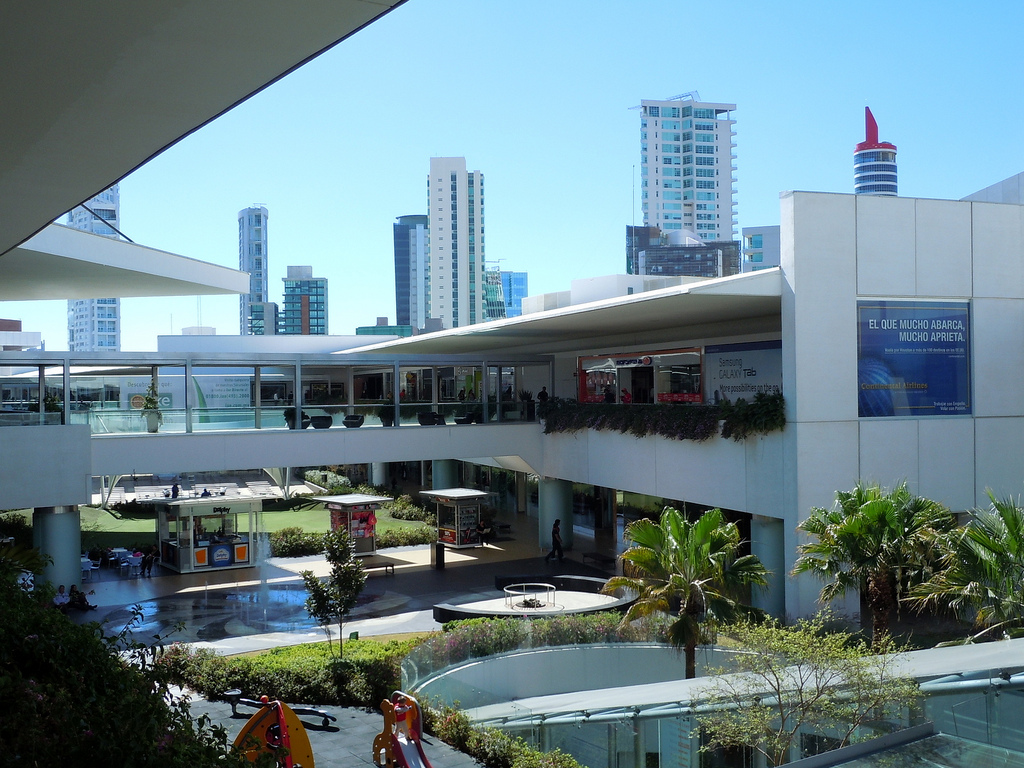
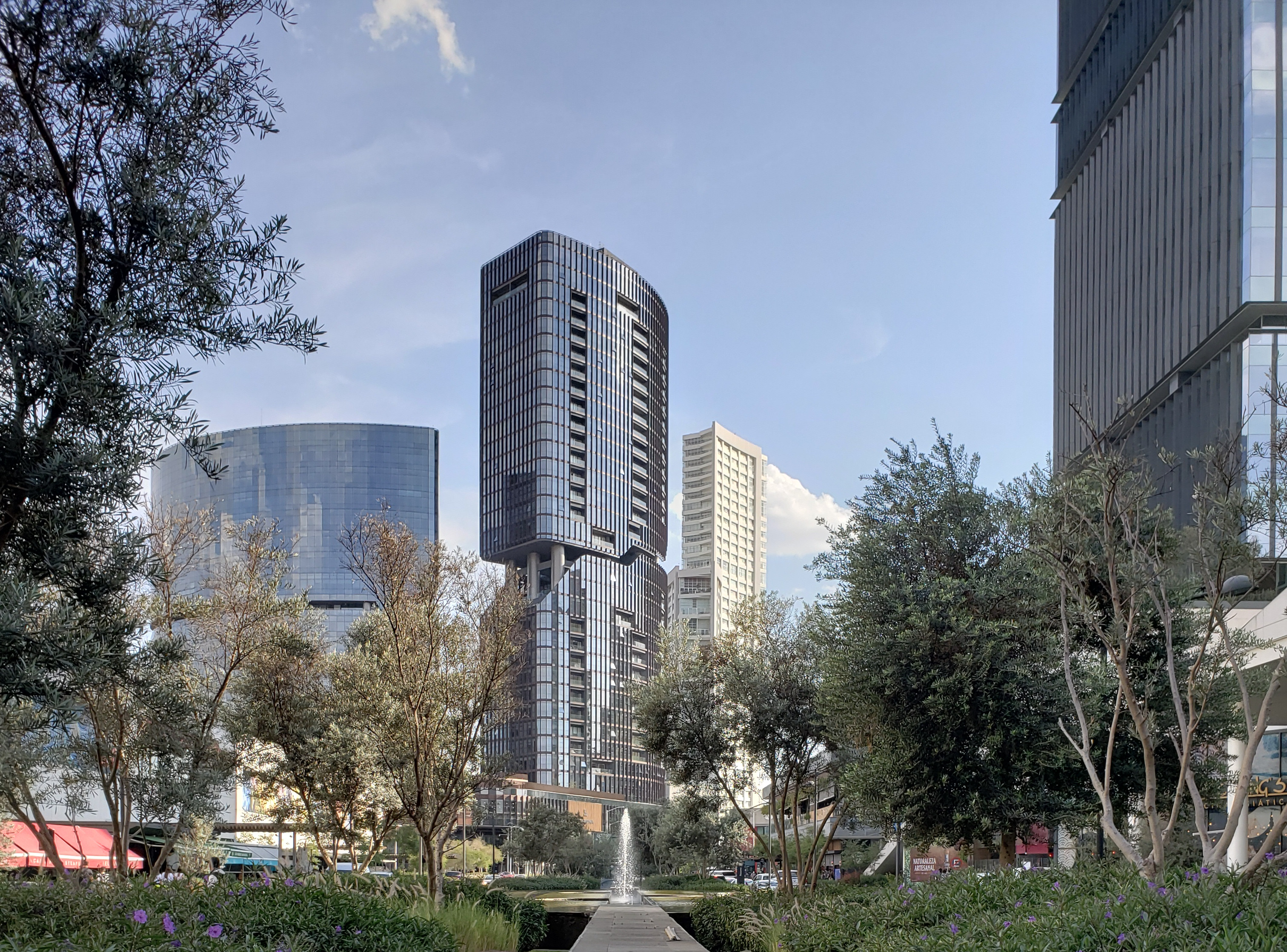
- Zapopan Municipal Palace Basilica of Our Lady of Zapopan Monumento del Maíz Arcos de Zapopan Andares Shopping Mall Puerta de Hierro Residences

- Flag Coat of arms

- Zapopan in Jalisco

- Location in Mexico
- Coordinates: 20°43′13″N 103°23′31″W
- Country: Mexico
- State: Jalisco
- Founded: 8 December 1541
- Founded as: Nuestra Señora de la Concepción de Tzapopan
- Municipal Status: 1825

Government
  - Municipal president: Juan José Frangie Saade

Area
  - Municipality: 893.15 km^{2} (344.85 sq mi)
- Elevation (of seat): 1,571 m (5,154 ft)

Population (2020)
  - Municipality: 1,476,491
  - Rank: 1st in Jalisco; 7th in Mexico; 16th in North America
  - Density: 1,620/km^{2} (4,200/sq mi)
  - Seat: 1,257,547
- Time zone: UTC−06:00 (Zona Centro)
- Postal code (of seat): 45010
- Area code: 33
- Demonym: Zapopano
- Website: (in Spanish) Municipal official site

Zapopan (Latin American Spanish pronunciation: [saˈpopan]) is a city and municipality located in the Mexican state of Jalisco. It is part of the Guadalajara Metropolitan Area. Zapopan is the most populous municipality in the state of Jalisco.

Zapopan is notable for the Basilica of Our Lady of Zapopan, which houses a 16th-century image of the Virgin Mary. The statue has been recognized by various popes and was visited by Pope John Paul II. The municipality is also home to the Centro Cultural Universitario as well as the Estadio Akron, C.D. Guadalajara's official stadium.

The name Zapopan means "among the sapote trees". It derives from the Nahuatl word tzapotl "sapote" with the addition of the locative suffix -pan. The municipality was historically known as 'ex Villa Maicera' (former corn village) due to its past prominence in corn production. The municipal seal, designed by José Trinidad Laris in 1941, commemorates the 400th anniversary of Zapopan's founding.

== History ==
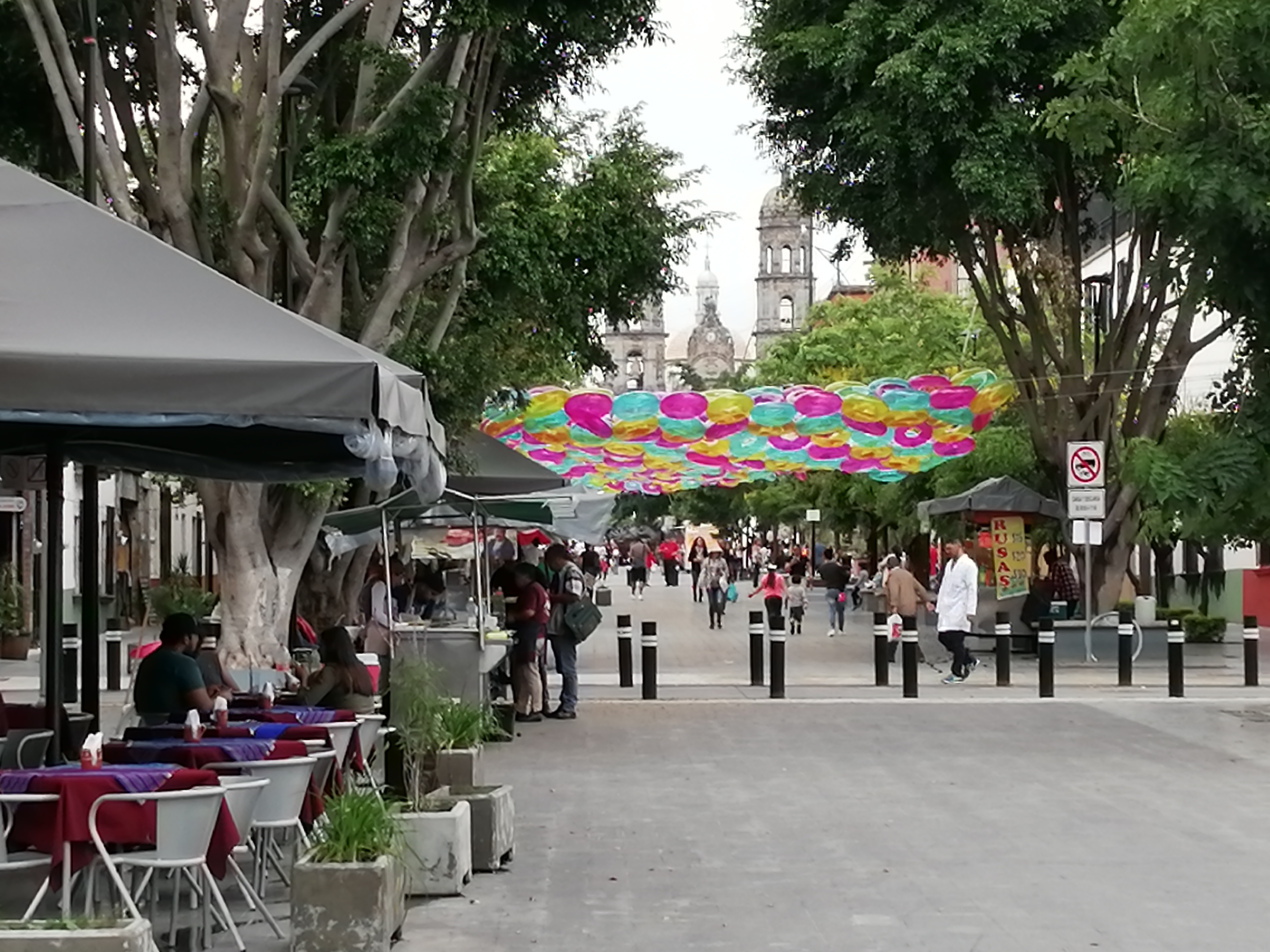
20 de Noviembre Avenue in Zapopan Square

Between 1160 and 1325, groups including Zapotec, Nahua, and Maya peoples migrated into the Zapopan area from the south, particularly around the Profundo Arroyo. Over time, these groups intermingled with later arrivals such as the Aztecs. The Tecuexes were the dominant local group, and these individuals are known as "Tecos". The area contained small shrines, called cues, mainly built to worship the sun. Teoplitzintli, associated with maize, was a principal deity.

By the time of the Spanish arrival, Tzapopan had grown into a fairly large settlement, although it was in decline due to wars with various surrounding nomadic tribes. The settlement fell under the authority of the Atemajac, also called Tlatoanazgo, which itself was subject to the Hueytlatoanazgo of Tonalá.

In 1530, the area was conquered by Nuño de Guzmán, however the Spanish did not settle in Zapopan until 1541 due to the Mixtón War. That year, Francisco de Bobadilla, encomendero of Tlatltenango, relocated approximately 130 Indigenous people from his lands to repopulate Zapopan and partly to stabilize the region after the conflict. Accompanying them was a statue of the Virgin Mary. The statue had previously traveled to areas such Zacatecas as part of evangelization efforts. It would eventually take on the name of "Our Lady of Zapopan," and a sanctuary for the statue began construction in 1689.

In 1824, Zapopan was named as the seat of one of the 26 departments of the newly created state of Jalisco. When the departments were reorganized in 1837, it retained its status as a seat. In 1873, General Ramón Corona fought against rebel forces led by Manuel Lozada "El Tigre de Álica" at Rancho de la Mojonera.

In 1979, Pope John Paul II visited the Basilica of Our Lady of Zapopan.

=== Pre-Hispanic Era ===
Some historians dispute the existence of a pre-Hispanic settlement at the site of present-day Zapopan, as it is not mentioned in any contemporary documents, unlike the nearby settlements of Ixcatán, Tesistán, and Tónala.

According to some historians, between 1160 and 1135, Zapotec, Nahua, and Maya groups migrated into the area that would eventually become Zapopan. These groups later mixed with other groups, including the Aztecs, although the Tecuexes were the dominant group. Early settlements reportedly had religious shrines, primarily dedicated to the sun god and Teopiltzintl. Inhabitants subsisted on maize, beans, fruits, hunting, and fishing.

Despite the fact that Tzapopan may have once been populous, conflicts with neighboring nomadic tribes reduced it to a smaller settlement. It was under the authority of Atemajac, itself under the Hueytlatonazgo of Tonalá, and played a minor role at the time of the Spanish arrival.

=== Conquest ===
Around 1530, Nuño de Guzman conquered the Kingdom of Tonalá, which included Tzazopan. After the Mixtón War in 1541, Francisco de Bobadilla, encomendero of Tlaltenango, resettled the area with indigenous peoples from his estate. Friars Antonio de Segovia and Ángel of Valencia placed an image of the Virgin Mary in the settlement on 8 December 1541, which became the patroness of Zapopan. This image reportedly played a central role in stabilizing the settlement. Construction of the present basilica began in 1690 under Juan de Santiago de León Garabito.

Certain historical accounts mention a figure named Nicolás de Bobadilla, reportedly having arrived with Indigenous people from Xalostotitlán around 1541-1543. No reliable evidence, however, confirms his presence or role.

Although it has been suggested that the area was repopulated, chronicles indicate that Indigenous peoples east of the San Juan de Dios River were not displaced during the Mixtón War. Towns were assigned to encomenderos according to Spanish colonial administration practices, rather than being abandoned and resettled.

The foundation of Zapopan is closely linked with the image of the Virgin Mary. During the Spanish conquest, colonial authorities often replaced indigenous religious icons with images of the Virgin. The Virgin of Zapopan became known as a "peacemaker in the wars against the Indigenous people" and the location developed into a prominent shrine in western Mexico.

Friar Antonio de Segovia placed the image at Zapopan, which served as a common religious site for local leaders, following colonial practices of spiritual conquest. The choice of location was not based on population size.

In conclusion, Zapopan was before the conquest a center of worship, and continued to be so after that, as a center of veneration of a Christian image. Subsequently, a population emerged, with Indians owned by Francisco de Bobadilla, encomendero of the region of Tlaltenango, not of Xalostotitlán, around 1570.

The aforementioned Francisco de Bobadilla is a descendant of Pedro de Bobadilla, who belonged to the hosts of Nuño de Guzmán during the conquest; Peter Gerard has conducted the most comprehensive study on the institution of the encomienda in the 17th century in Mexico and identifies a Pedro de Bobadilla as encomendero of the Tlaltenango region based in Tepechitlán around 1608.

=== 19th Century ===
Basílica de Zapopan

On 21 June 1823, after the brief and failed imperial takeover by the newly independent viceroyalty of New Spain, the territory of the former province of Guadalajara was proclaimed as the Free State of Jalisco, the first of those who would make up the Federal Republic. The newly established state of Jalisco changed the political division of territory of its jurisdiction—which had been used since the Bourbon reforms—into departments, which in turn were subject to a larger unit known as a Canton. Each Canton was administered by a political chief who depended, in turn, on the Governor of the State. It concentrated political, military and fiscal authority.

On 27 March 1824, under the Political Division Plan of the State of Jalisco, Zapopan was designated a state department, with the town of Zapopan serving as its administrative center and formally recognized as a villa. On November 18 of the same year, once the Political Constitution of the Free and Sovereign State of Jalisco was promulgated, Zapopan was ratified as a department and attached to the first Canton of the State, with the head office in Guadalajara.The Villa de Zapopan was located (and is located) to the northwest of the city of Guadalajara, communicated with it by two paths: the first of them ran to the south-east of Zapopan, crossed the Colomos stream and entered the west part of Guadalajara; the second exited to the east of Zapopan, passing through Zoquipan and Atemajac and then entering through the northern part of Guadalajara through the neighborhood of Mezquitán.

In 1857, with the liberal republicans in power, Jalisco is a state and Zapopan a department attached to the first Canton of Jalisco. At this time, the main populations besides Zapopan were: Tesistan, which is located 10 km (6.2 mi) north-west of the head; Santa Ana Tepetitlán, located 15 km (9.3 mi) south of the headwaters; Atemajac 5 km (3.1 mi) east of the Villa; San Cristobal, 40 km (25 mi) northwest. Other locations included San Juan de Ocotán, 5 km (3.1 mi) to the southwest; Jocotán, 5 km (3.1 mi) south; Nextipac, 12 km (7.5 mi) to the west; Zoquipan, 2 km (1.2 mi) to the east; Sale of the Shipyard, 17 km (11 mi) southwest; and San Esteban and Huaxtla located 10 km (6.2 mi) northeast above the Oblate Canyon.

A state territorial reform on 6 April 1837 incorporated Zapopan into the Guadalajara District. In 1846, a subsequent reorganization reinstated Zapopan as a department within the First Canton of Jalisco, with Guadalajara as its head. This administrative structure remained largely unchanged until 1914, when municipalities became the primary territorial units of Mexico. The 1917 Political Constitution of Jalisco established Zapopan as a free municipality.

The status of Zapopan as a municipal seat remained until 7 December 1994, when state decree 14358 elevated it from a villa to a ciudad (city).

== City ==
=== Basilica of Zapopan and Virgin of Zapopan ===
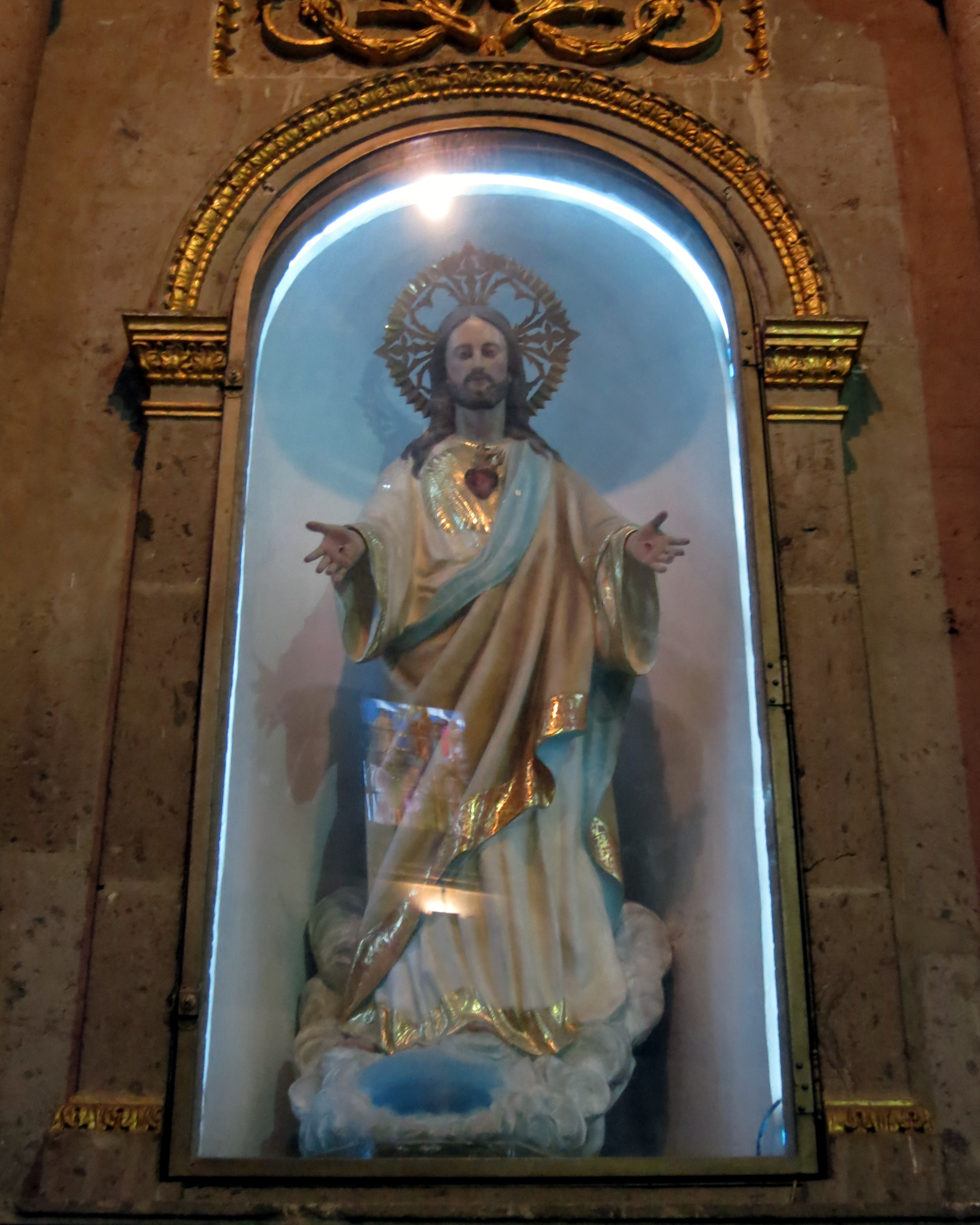
Statue of Sacred Heart of Jesus

The Virgin of Zapopan is an image of Our Lady of the Conception which was made in Michoacán by native artisans in the early 16th century. The statue is 34 cm (13 in) tall and made with corn stalks (caña de maíz), except for her hands which are made of wood. It was donated for evangelization efforts by Antonio de Segovia, and carried to Zapopan by Miguel de Bolonia, who had the image tied to his body. Tradition holds that the image played a role in ending the Mixtón War in the 16th century and was associated with relief from 17th-century epidemics in Guadalajara. It was named the "General" (La Generala) of the Army of the Three Guarantees in 1821, with the military title ratified in 1852 and 1894 by elements of the federal and state governments. It is still called by this alternate name. In 1919, it was crowned Queen of Jalisco by the Pope Benedict XV.

Construction of the Basilica of Zapopan began in 1689. and finished in 1892. It has been modified and expanded since then. In front of the structure is a large atrium. The atrium contains bronze statues of Antonio de Segovia, who donated the image of the Virgin in the 16th century and one of Pope John Paul II, with a child dressed as a charro, who represents Jalisco. The facade is Plateresque and the entrances have Ionic columns and coats of arms. The main altar is made of marble from Carrara and Cyprus with the image of the Virgin of Zapopan in a glass case at the top. Another important sculpture is that of the Holy Family, which has been in the church since 1832. It was sculpted by Victoriano Acuña.

In 1940 Pope Pius XII designated the church a basilica. Part of the basilica building is dedicated to the Huichol Museum, which is dedicated to the art and culture of the Huichol people as well as some displays from the Tepehuán and Cora peoples. Another section of the basilica houses the Museum of the Virgin of Zapopan, where offerings left for the image can be seen, as well as items that have been used for its worship over the centuries.

Annually, a large procession in this image's honor takes place on the 12th of October, coinciding with Columbus Day (called "Día de la Raza" (Day of the Race) in Spanish). This tradition started in 1734, when this image was named the patron of Guadalajara and the protector against epidemics, storms and other calamities. Starting at 6 am, the image is carried on the streets from the Guadalajara Cathedral to the Basilica of Zapopan. The streets, including the wide avenue of Manuel Avila Camacho in Zapopan proper, are packed with dancers, vendors selling traditional food and crafts and spectators. The image stops periodically to receive homage from the many traditional dance groups and mariachi bands along the way. Traditional dances include "Los Tastoanes," "La Danza del Águila Real," "la de La Conquista" and "Los Huehuenches." Once returned to its home at the Basilica, celebrations continue and end with fireworks at night.

=== Other landmarks ===
On Paseo Teopiltzintli, which was the main thoroughfare into the city, is the Arco de Ingreso a Zapopan (Entrance Arch), built by the Spanish founders of the city. It is made of quarried stone and is twenty metres (66 ft) high. The arch area is decorated with sculptures and the arch itself is topped with large jars and an eagle. The Paseo Teopiltzintli leads to the Plaza de las Americas, after passing the Plaza Cívica.

The Plaza de las Américas—Juan Pablo II Square is located on the eastern side of the Basilica of Zapopan. It is paved with pink quarried stone, and contains a stone kiosk and four large fountains. There are two large sculptures in bronze depicting the god and goddess of corn, done by Juan Méndez. A statue of John Paul II is located here also.

The main walking corridor of the city is Andador 20 de Noviembre, which is lined with galleries, bars, and restaurants. On Saturdays, artists and antique dealers display their wares for sale on the walkway.

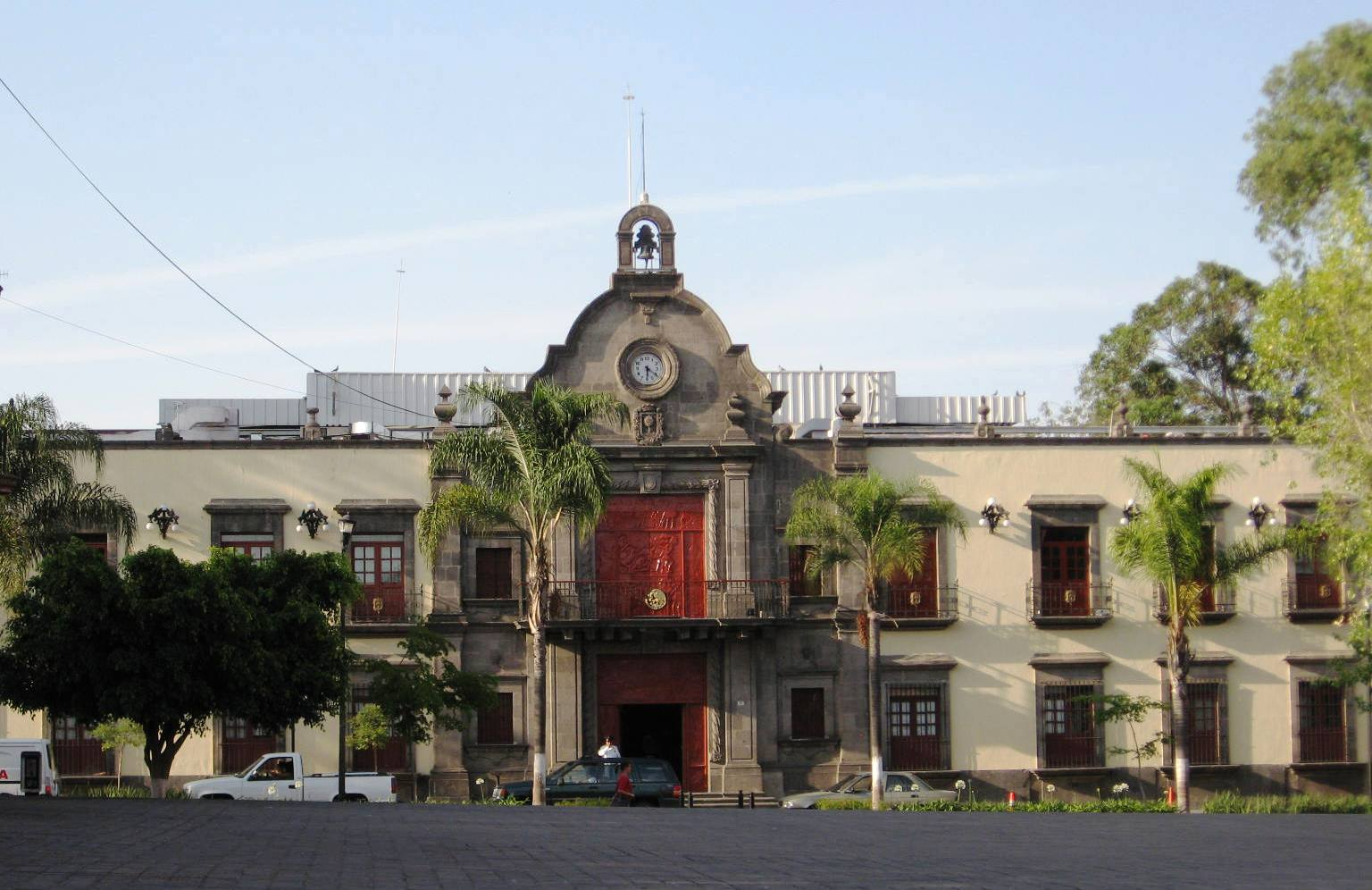
Municipal Palace

The Municipal Palace was constructed in 1942 as a school. It became the seat of the municipal government in 1968, and has been remodeled several times since. The facade is decorated with reliefs. The building's staircase contains a mural called "La Revolución Universal" (The Universal Revolution) done by Guadalajara artist Guillermo Chavez Vega in 1970. This mural depicts scenes from the French, Industrial, English, Mexican and Socialist Revolutions. It also contains images of indigenous art. The Plaza Cívica or Civic Plaza is in front of the municipal palace, with a 7 metres (23 ft) flagpole and a bronze sculpture of the Mexican themed eagle devouring a serpent.

The Municipal Cultural Center, built in 1979, holds exhibitions of fine art as well as theatrical and dance events. Next to it is the Plaza del Arte (Art Plaza) which is decorated with arches and columns of quarried stone and three permanent sculptures. The main mural of the building is entitled "La Historia de la Villa y la Revolución Mexicana" (The story of the village and the Mexican Revolution) painted in 1980 by Ricardo Peña. It also contains twenty-three other murals done by art students over the years.

The Estadio Akron football stadium of the Guadalajara's club C.D. Guadalajara is next to the Bosque de la Primavera, in the northwestern Guadalajara Metropolitan area, just off the Anillo Periferico ring road and Avenida Vallarta in Zapopan. The stadium covers 147,000 square metres (1,580,000 ft^{2}) and has seating for over 45,000 people.

The Neoclassical style Temple of San Pedro Apóstol was finished at the end of the 19th century. The atrium has a balustrade, and contains two large crosses with reliefs carved on them. The facade of the church is made of quarried stone with buttresses that flank the portal and side walls. Inside is a sculpture of Saint Peter, done by J. Cruz de la Mora in 1931, who was a native of Zapopan. The church also contains a painting from the 17th century done by Juan Correa called "The Baptism of Jesus."

The Centro Cultural Universitario is an ongoing project among the University of Guadalajara, the Municipality of Zapopan, the state of Jalisco, and the federal government to create a major cultural venue in western Mexico. The main structure is the Auditorio Telmex, an important concert venue in Latin America. There is also the Foro Alterno (Alternate Forum) which seats 15,000 people. The project was begun in 2001, and other institutions located here include the Juan José Arreola State Library, the Conjunto de Artes Escenicas (Scenic Arts Complex), and the Environmental Science Museum.

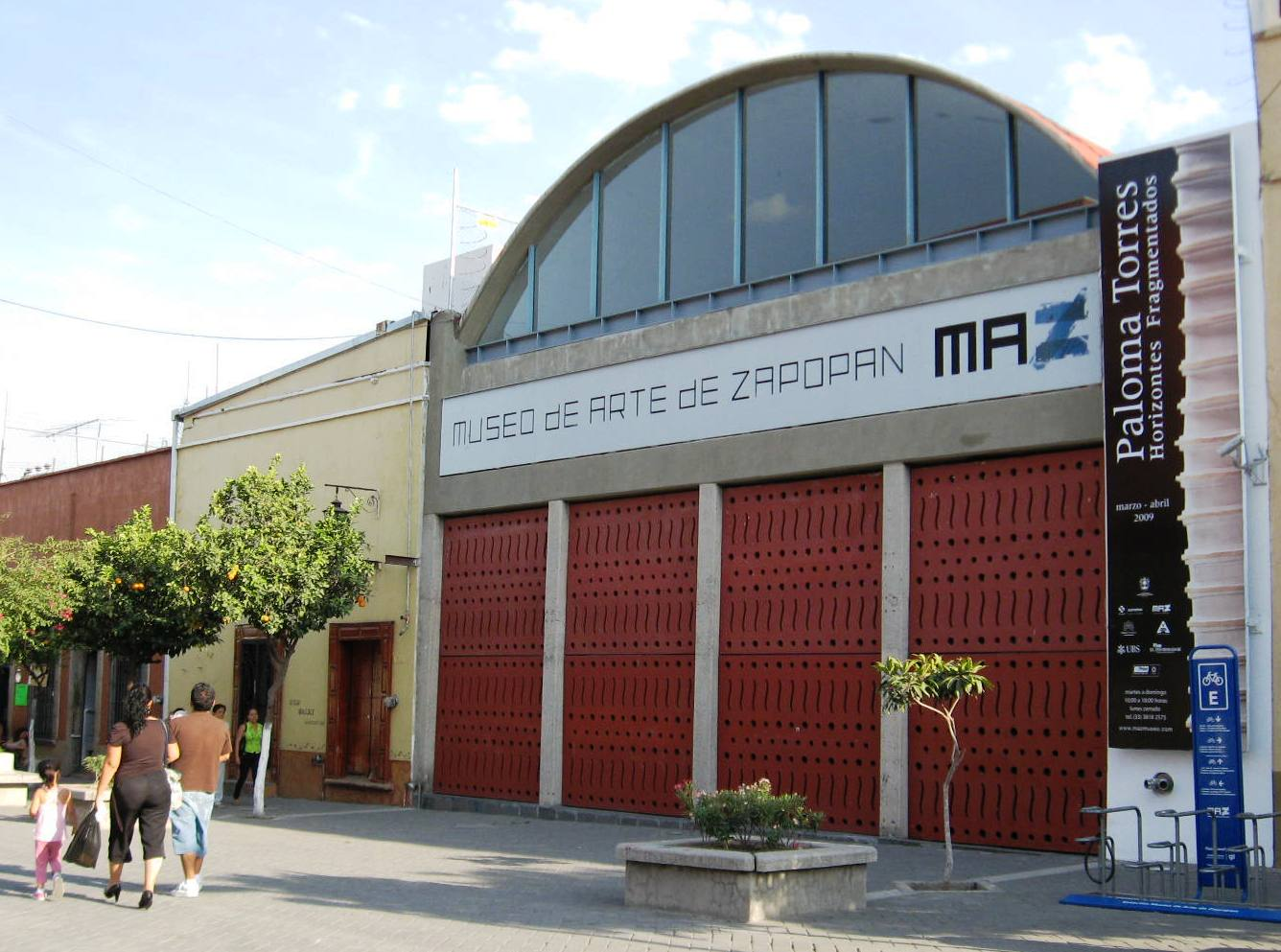
Zapopan Art Museum

Other cultural venues in the city include:

- Galerías Theater, inaugurated in 1991 and the site of modern musicals, concerts, cultural festivals, and conventions.
- Museo de Arte de Zapopan (Zapopan Art Museum) presents permanent and temporary exhibitions as well as workshops. It is located in front of the Plaza Cívica.
- Museo de Cacería Albarrán (Albarrán Hunting Museum) has a Sudanese style facade. In this museum are three halls which exhibit 270 hunting trophies from many parts of the world, some of which are the full animals but most are heads. The building is of modern design and the collection belonged to Benito Albarrán, a renowned game hunter.

=== Shopping centers ===
- Andares anchored by Palacio de Hierro and Liverpool department stores
- Distrito La Perla (Liverpool)
- University Square (Soriana Super)
- Patio La Cima
- Avila camacho
- Valle Real
- Calandrias
- San Isidro
- Av. Vallarta
- Parques Guadalajara
- Patria
- El Batan
- Plaza Cordilleras (Soriana Hiper, Office Depot, Cinemex and The Home Depot)
- Plaza San Isidro (Soriana Hiper, Famsa and Office Max)
- Bugambilias Square (Soriana Hyper)
- Bugambilias Panoramic Square (Superama)
- Plaza Las Fuentes (Comercial Mexicana)
- San Isidro Point (Superama)
- Plaza Santa Margarita (Bodega Aurrerá)
- Aviation Square (Soriana and Coppel Market)
* Tepeyac Square (Soriana Hyper and Toks)
- Plaza Las Aguilas
- Guadalupe Square (Super Soriana)
- South Square (Super Soriana)
- Plaza Aqueduct (Selecto Chedraui, Home Depot and Cinemex)
- Belenes Terrace Square (Cinepolis, Soriana)
- Gallery Square
- Plaza Real Center (Cinepolis)
- Costco (San Isidro)

=== Zapopum ===
The Zapopum Festival started out as the municipal fair of Zapopan in 2005. Since, it has morphed into a major cultural event. It aims to be "a cultural reference point, whose purpose is to spread culture and bring it to the public who is accustomed to other types of shows". There are also workshops, themed pavilions and shows by popular Mexican artists such as Marco Antonio Muñiz, Gloria Trevi, and Ricardo Montaner. The event has attracted as many as 800,000 people in past years.

== Municipality ==
As municipal seat, the city of Zapopan is the local government for approximately 750 other communities, called localities, which together form a territory of 893.15 km^{2} (344.85 sq mi). Almost 90% of the municipality's population lives in the city proper. Zapopan is the most populous municipality in the state of Jalisco and ranks seventh in Mexico. Aside from the seat, the most important localities are Nuevo México, San Francisco Tesistán, Valle Real, La Venta del Astillero, La Magdalena (San José Ejidal), Nextipac, Ciudad Bugambilias, Base Aérea Militar de la XV Zona, San Esteban (San Miguel Tateposco). This municipality is bordered by the municipalities of Tequila, San Cristóbal de la Barranca, Tlajomulco de Zuñiga, Tlaquepaque, Guadalajara, Ixtlahuacán del Río, Tala, Arenal, and Amatitán.

Most of the municipality is flat with another quarter having rolling hills. Altitude varies from 1,500 to 2,000 metres (4,900 to 6,600 ft) above sea level. The main elevations are in the Sierra de la Primavera and include Nejahuete, Tajo, and El Chapulin. Superficial water flows mostly in arroyos east to the Grande or Santiago River. In the center of the municipality there are three dams called the Copalita, the Santa Lucia and the San Jose. Winters here are mild and usually are noticeable only in the higher elevations. Average year-round temperature is 22 °C with highs of 36 °C and lows of 11 °C. Rain principally falls from June to October. Vegetation in the municipality varies from pines and holm oaks in the Sierra de la Primavera and species such as jonote (Heliocarpus appendiculatus), strawberry trees and nopals in the lower elevations. While wildlife has nearly disappeared from this area, the Bosque el Nixticuil on the northern edge of the urban sprawl has been designated as a protected natural area and still is home to many mammals, reptiles, amphibians, birds, and insects.

Climate data for Zapopan (1991–2020)
| Month | Jan | Feb | Mar | Apr | May | Jun | Jul | Aug | Sep | Oct | Nov | Dec | Year |
|---|---|---|---|---|---|---|---|---|---|---|---|---|---|
| Record high °C (°F) | 36.0 (96.8) | 39.0 (102.2) | 40.5 (104.9) | 42.0 (107.6) | 41.0 (105.8) | 41.0 (105.8) | 36.5 (97.7) | 38.5 (101.3) | 39.0 (102.2) | 39.0 (102.2) | 39.0 (102.2) | 39.0 (102.2) | 42.0 (107.6) |
| Mean daily maximum °C (°F) | 24.5 (76.1) | 27.0 (80.6) | 29.4 (84.9) | 31.8 (89.2) | 33.0 (91.4) | 30.8 (87.4) | 27.9 (82.2) | 27.7 (81.9) | 27.2 (81.0) | 27.3 (81.1) | 26.4 (79.5) | 24.9 (76.8) | 28.2 (82.8) |
| Daily mean °C (°F) | 16.6 (61.9) | 18.5 (65.3) | 20.5 (68.9) | 22.7 (72.9) | 24.3 (75.7) | 23.6 (74.5) | 21.8 (71.2) | 21.8 (71.2) | 21.5 (70.7) | 20.8 (69.4) | 18.9 (66.0) | 17.1 (62.8) | 20.7 (69.3) |
| Mean daily minimum °C (°F) | 8.7 (47.7) | 10.0 (50.0) | 11.5 (52.7) | 13.6 (56.5) | 15.5 (59.9) | 16.3 (61.3) | 15.8 (60.4) | 15.9 (60.6) | 15.8 (60.4) | 14.4 (57.9) | 11.4 (52.5) | 9.2 (48.6) | 13.2 (55.8) |
| Record low °C (°F) | −4.0 (24.8) | −2.0 (28.4) | 1.0 (33.8) | 1.0 (33.8) | 7.0 (44.6) | 7.0 (44.6) | 7.0 (44.6) | 6.0 (42.8) | 8.0 (46.4) | 7.0 (44.6) | 1.0 (33.8) | −7.0 (19.4) | −7.0 (19.4) |
| Average precipitation mm (inches) | 19.7 (0.78) | 13.2 (0.52) | 5.1 (0.20) | 3.0 (0.12) | 23.6 (0.93) | 205.2 (8.08) | 282.2 (11.11) | 220.3 (8.67) | 192.7 (7.59) | 60.3 (2.37) | 11.7 (0.46) | 8.8 (0.35) | 1,045.8 (41.17) |
| Average precipitation days (≥ 0.1 mm) | 1.8 | 1.2 | 0.6 | 0.6 | 2.9 | 13.4 | 19.3 | 17.8 | 14.2 | 5.8 | 1.8 | 1.6 | 81.0 |
Source: Servicio Meteorológico Nacional

See or edit raw graph data. About three-quarters of the municipality's land is used for agriculture and livestock. About fifteen percent is forested and the remaining is dedicated to the city of Zapopan. The principal crops are corn, sorghum, squash, tomatoes, chickpeas, avocados, mangos and plums. Some livestock such as cattle, pigs and domestic fowl are raised. Agriculture employs less than three percent of the population. About a third of the population is employed in industry and manufacturing. Major companies that have facilities here include Kodak, Motorola and Coca-Cola. The rest of the population is involved in commerce and services.

Tourism is mostly focused on the Basilica of Zapopan and other local churches, however, outside the city there are a number of natural attractions such as Ixcatán Geysers and the La Cola de Caballo waterfall. At the Santa Lucia dam one can fish and go out on rowboats. Cola de Caballo is a 150 m (490 ft) tall waterfall which is part of the Blanco Arroyo. The Geysers of Ixcatan are geothermic zone with a number of geysers which jump out with a temperature of 45 °C (113 °F) up to 5 m (16 ft) high. At Cerro del Diente are large rocks where mountain climbing, rock climbing and rappelling are practiced. The Barranca del Río Santiago, also known as the Barranca del Oblatos, is a canyon which is 3.5 km (2.2 mi) wide, 700 m (2,300 ft) deep and 200 km (120 mi) long. The Bosque de la Primavera (Primavera Forest) covers 30,500 hectares (75,000 acres) over the Sierra de la Primavera. The forest area has both fresh water and thermal springs and varied plant and wildlife. There are a number of signaled hiking trails with signs pointing out interesting points and plants. Another forest in the municipality is the Bosque El Centinela, which is an area that was reforested in the late 1970s and has mountain biking paths and campgrounds. A number of water parks such as Rio Caliente and La Primavera have been established.

The municipality has three main archaeological sites. Ixtépete contains a Teotihuacan style pyramid which is 20 m (66 ft) long, 16 m (52 ft) wide and 1.83 m (6 ft 0 in) high. Construction phases of this pyramid date back from the fifth century to the tenth century. El Grillo is located in the Tabachines housing subdivision in the north of the Valley of Atemajac. This site has a series of fourteen tombs arranged along an arroyo which is now dry. La Coronilla is located in an area called La Experiencia. In and around the city of Zapopan, there have been findings of ancient tombs. One example is when about a dozen pre-Hispanic objects were found during a hydraulic work excavation at Ciudad Granja, in Zapopan, Jalisco. A pot, a vase and anthropomorphic figures are among the items discovered. These objects are of the Shaft Tombs Tradition which developed between 100 BCE and 500 CE in western Mexico. Further excavations are planned to search for a shaft tomb. The initial discovery was made by construction workers in May 2009 while doing maintenance work.

The La Mojonera Ranch is the site of the confrontation between government forces under General Ramón Corona and rebels led by Manuel Lozada "El Tigre de Alicia" on 28 January 1873. The event is called the Battle of La Mojonera.

=== Demographic evolution ===
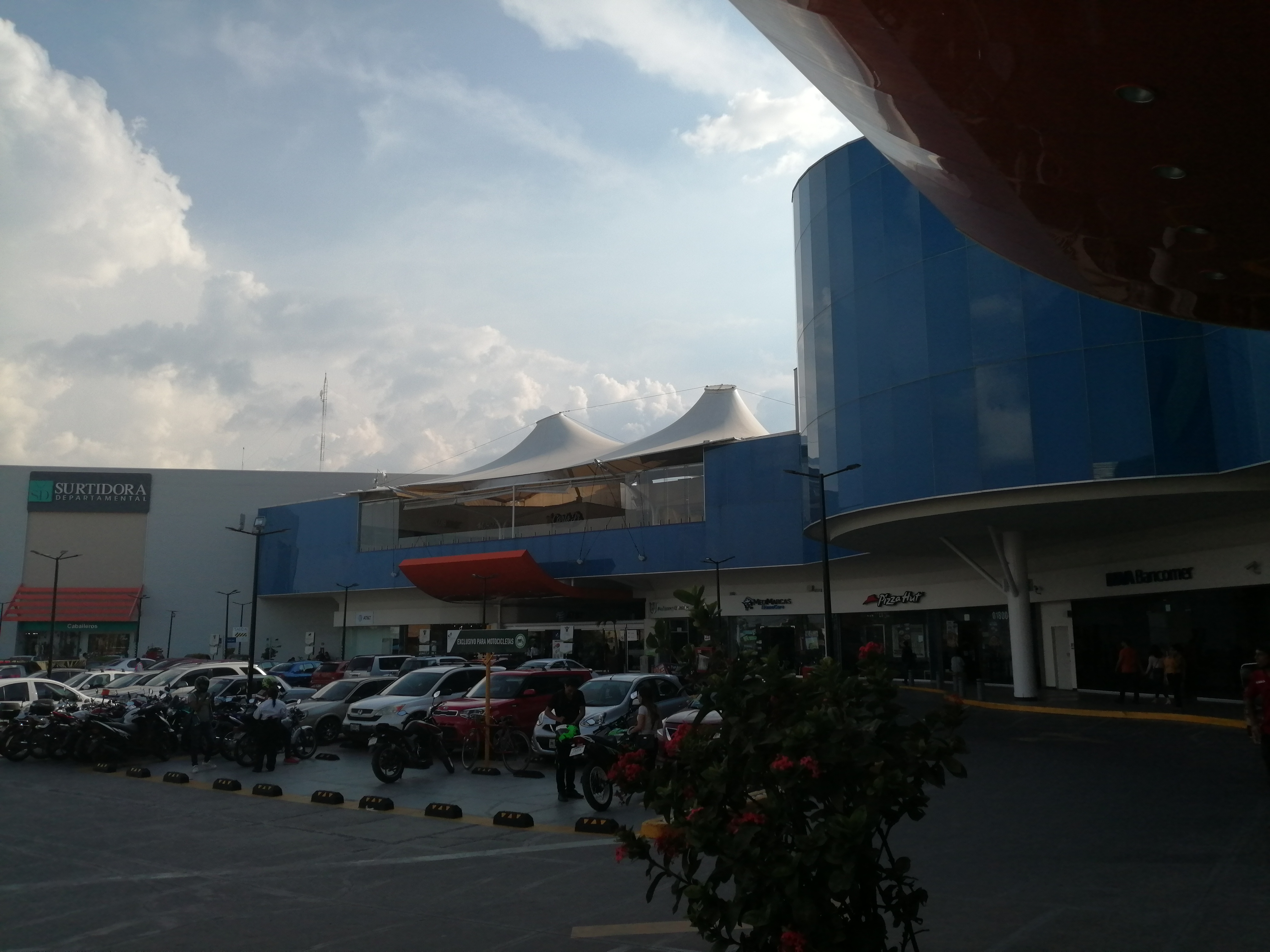
Grand Terrace Square of Belenes

The population of Zapopan has grown exponentially since 1950. In 1950 the total population of the municipality of Zapopan amounted to 27,115 inhabitants. In ten years the population of the municipality increased 100% and by the year 1960 reached 54,562 inhabitants. Between 1960 and 1970, the population grew 300% and reached 163,185 inhabitants by 1970. The population increase during the 1970s was 238.5%, which amounted to 389,081 inhabitants in 1980. In 1990, Zapopan had 712,008 inhabitants, and by 2000, the population exceeded one million.

=== List of colonias ===
- Arcos de Zapopan
- Colonia de Zapopan
- El Vigia
- San Isidro Ejidal
- Las Bóvedas
- Tesistán
- Constitución

=== Topography ===
Most of its surface area is made up of flat areas (58%), it is followed in proportion to semi-flat areas (26%) and rugged areas (16%), with heights ranging from 1,500 to 2,000 m (4,900 to 6,600 ft) above sea level. The main elevations are located in the Sierra de La Primavera, highlight the Nejahuete table at 2,110 m (6,920 ft), the hill of the Tagus or Pelón, at 2,050 m (6,730 ft) and El Chapulín, at 2,020 m (6,630 ft).

=== Hydrography ===
Its hydrological resources are distributed in different surface and underground currents. Temporary surface currents drain from the Atemajac Valley to the east of the municipality, directly increasing the channel of the Rio Grande or Santiago. The most important permanent surface currents are: the Santiago River and the San Antonio, Grande, La Higuerita, Blanco, Atemajac, and Las Tortugas streams. In the central part of the municipality are the dams of Copalita and Santa Lucia, and the San José dam, in addition to several storages and wells.

=== Flora and fauna ===
The city's vegetation is composed of pine and oaks from Sierra la Primavera, in addition to the species of cretón, jonote, madroño, ozote, savila, and nopal in the northern and eastern part in the ravine.

=== Wildlife ===
The current wildlife list includes 106 species of animals such as the white-tailed deer, cougar, lynx, coyote, grey fox, badger, hare, raccoon among others and have been identified about 137 species of birds both migratory and resident and we can observe falcons, eagles, herons, thrushes, quails, roadrunners, woodpeckers, and many more.

=== Soil ===
The territory consists of land of the tertiary and quaternary periods. The municipality has a territorial area of 89,315 hectares (220,700 acres), of which 43,269 ha (106,920 acres) are used for agricultural purposes, 423,730 ha (1,047,100 acres) in livestock activity, 411,400 ha (1,017,000 acres) are for forest use, 43,910 ha (108,500 acres) are urban land and 47,006 ha (116,150 acres) have another use. As far as the property is concerned, an area of 449,031 ha (1,109,580 acres) is private and another is 432,938 ha (1,069,810 acres) ejido; 47,346 ha (116,990 acres) are communal property. Zapopan, according to the type and land use, has obtained for several years the first national place in yield per hectare.

=== Policy ===
As in the rest of the municipalities in Mexico, Zapopan is governed by a municipal president elected for a three-year term, and this position was held—from 2015 to 2018—by Pablo Lemus of the Citizen Movement Party. Legislative power rests with the cabildo, occupied by persons elected by the municipal president when he seizes power.

The municipality is divided into three Federal Electoral Districts of Mexico, for the purpose of electing city representatives in federal legislative power. These districts are the IV, VI and X of the state of Jalisco.

Zapopan's City Hall is responsible for providing the public services of localities within the municipality: drinking water, drainage, street lighting, public safety, traffic regulation, maintenance of parks, gardens and cemeteries and urban planning. They participate in [public education], rescue and emergency services, environmental protection and the maintenance of parks and historical monuments. They also have the power to collect property taxes and other payments, although it can get more funds from the Jalisco State Government and Mexico's Federal Government Policy.

=== Economy ===
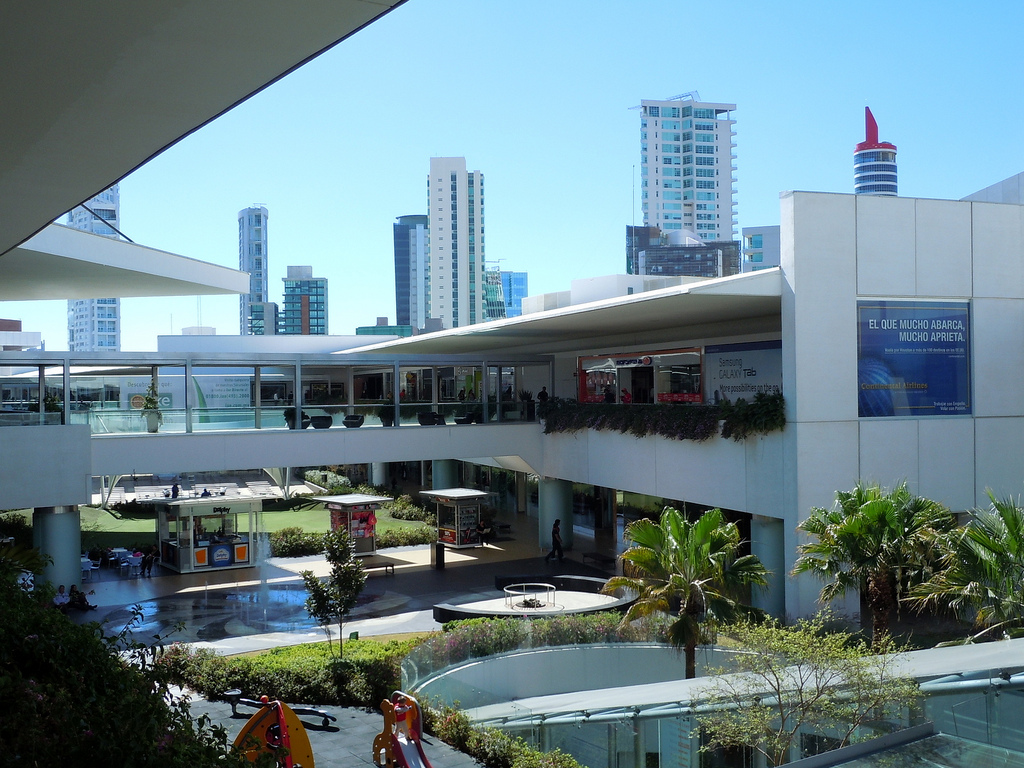
Andares Shopping Mall

Approximately 75% of the municipality's land is involved in agriculture and livestock, 15% is forested, and the rest are part of the urban area. Principal crops include maize, sorghum, pumpkin, tomato, snap beans, avocado, mango, and plum. cattle, pigs and poultry are also raised. Agriculture employs less than 3% of the population, while around one-third of the population is employed in industry and manufacturing. Major facilities include: Sabritas, Intel, Grupo Bimbo, Flextronics, Motorola, Jaguar Cars and Coca-Cola. The rest of the population is involved in commerce and services.

Zapopan features shopping malls, private hospitals and highly valued residential areas. As such, Zapopan is considered one of the wealthiest municipalities in Mexico.

== Education ==
=== Universities ===
There are several top-ranking universities, including the Universidad Panamericana, campus Guadalajara, Universidad Autonoma de Guadalajara and the Instituto Tecnológico y de Estudios Superiores de Monterrey (ITESM) has its second biggest campus in the city. In addition to this, the CUCEA, CUCSH, and CUCBA University Centers of the University of Guadalajara are also located in the city.

=== Primary and secondary schools ===
Schools include:

- Colegio Alemán de Guadalajara, a German international school
- Lycée Français de Guadalajara, a French international school
- Instituto de Ciencias, a Jesuit Catholic private school
- Instituto Miguel Ángel de Occidente
- Colegio Cervantes, run by Marist Brothers, private Catholic school

=== Weekend supplementary education ===
The Colegio Japones de Guadalajara A.C. Guadarahara Hoshū Jugyō Kō (グアダラハラ補習授業校), a part-time Japanese school, is at Secundaria y Preparatoria Femenil Colinas de San Javier in Zapopan. It provides lessons in the afternoon.

== Coat of arms ==
The Coat of arms of Zapopan is the emblem that represents the municipality, which is used by the municipal government of Zapopan as a seal in all its official documents. The shield also carries historical value for the municipality as it represents a tree of Zapote, from which the town took its name.

The coat presents the shape of the semicircular or semicircular Spanish Coat of Arms, and is fitted by a blue edge. It contains, in a sinople (green) background and a gold field, a tree that is also made of sinople and fruity with seven cherimoyas or gold zapotes; to its reclining trunk a spear pole with a flag of gules and behind, a dog in a silver contoured jump; instead of a simple gules cross, accompanied by a semicircular silver badge with the nickname of sinople: HOC SIGNUM VINCIT (This Sign Shall Win).

== Culture ==
Since Zapopan is part of the Guadalajara Metropolitan Area, and due to the great cultural movement that the city of Guadalajara currently lives, the municipality has a prominent feature in terms of culture, because it has a large list of events and cultural expressions, all this supported by many public and private institutions that operate in and around the municipality, especially the government and the University of Guadalajara.

=== Expressions of popular culture ===
In the municipality a wide variety of festivities with various themes are carried out, such as Zapopum! And the October Parties, in addition to many festivals held in the municipality of Guadalajara that greatly influence the life of the zapopanos. Zapopan contains numerous historical and cultural sites distributed throughout its territory, including colonial-era religious and civil buildings in the municipal seat, whose architectural styles represent the ethnic diversity of the municipality.

=== Museums and galleries ===
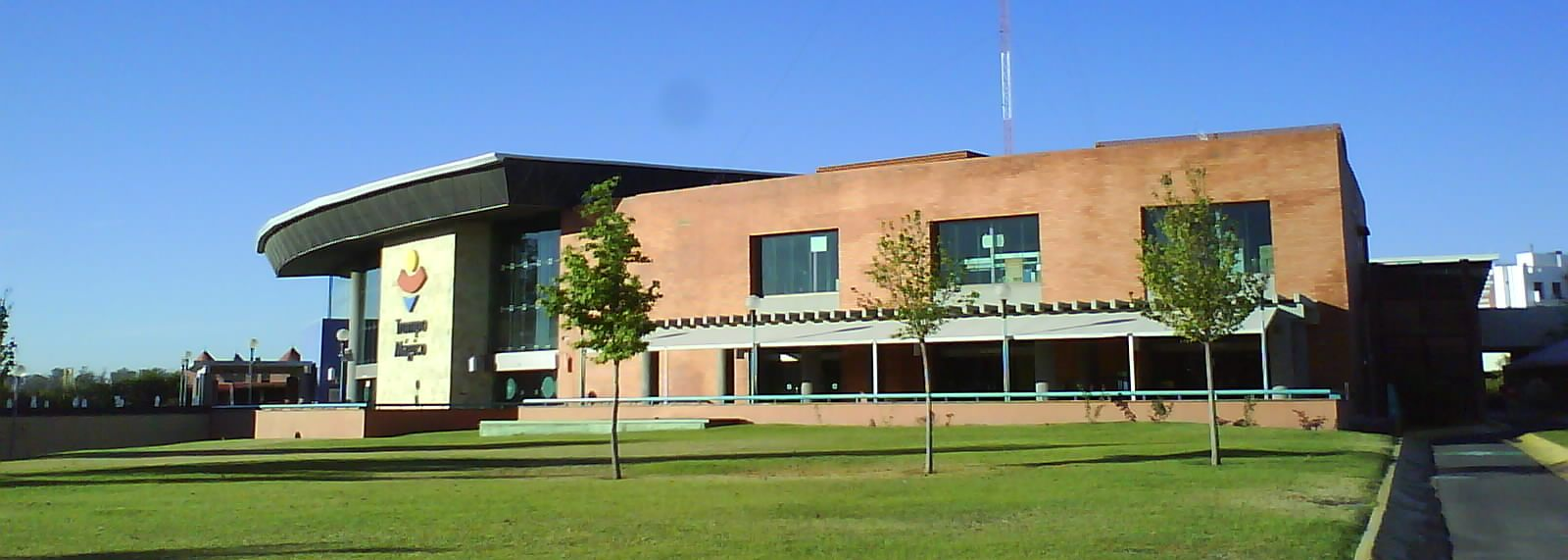
The Trompo Mágico Museum

As part of the conurbation of the City of Guadalajara, Zapopan is a municipality with a very wide cultural infrastructure in terms of museums. One of the main museums of the municipality is the Zapopan Art Museum (MAZ), museum and cultural center, which seeks to disseminate the best expressions of artistic activities and exhibitions in its various manifestations. It has three exhibition halls and a multidisciplinary forum that will host contemporary proposals for plastic, music, dance, theater and audiovisual media.

The Trompo Mágico is an interactive museum catered to children, offering exhibits and activities on various topics related to art, science, civics, among others. The Garden of Art is an exhibition and sale of outdoor art, which takes place every Sunday at the Glorieta Chapalita. The Mexican Air Force Air College has a historic gallery of the Mexican Air Force, Mexican expeditionary air force hall and aircraft model room. The Benito Albarrán Hunting Museum is a house in the Sudan style and has kept a taxidermy collection for 31 years of animals hunted by Don Benito Albarrán from three separate regions: The Americas, Eurasia and Africa, as well as 270 pieces depicting the huntings of over 110 different species presented in dioramas.

The Huichol Wixárica Museum of Art provides a permanent exhibition of handicrafts by the Huichol people, including textiles, beaded items, carved masks, and photographs depicting daily life. The Museum of the Virgin of Zapopan presents a collection of mantles of silver and gold threads, offerings made to the Virgin as a token of gratitude for some miracle, ancient paintings, niches in which the image was transported and a collection of various items used in past centuries for decoration. The box museum in Zapopan Palace of Culture and Communication

=== Plastic arts ===
The municipality has large paintings, among which "The Baptism of Jesus" carried out in the 17th century by Juan Correa, the mural of "The History of the Villa and the Mexican Revolution" painted in 1980 by Ricardo Peña is in the Municipal Center of Culture, where there are also 23 other murals made by painting students. In the municipal palace you can admire a mural made in 1970 by Guillermo Chavez Vega, a Tapatio painter, where scenes from the French, Industrial, English, Mexican and Socialist revolutions are captured.

=== Gastronomy ===
Like the rest of Mexico, there are multiple homemade fresh foods sold in the street based on corn such as pozole, tamales and atole. As in the municipality of Guadalajara, some typical dishes such as torta ahogada and esquites, cooked corn kernels that are served in a glass stand out and are accompanied, according to taste, ingredients such as lemon, salt, chili powder, cream and cheese, among others. There are traditional sweets prepared with coconut as alfajor and cocadas, and a variety of sweets prepared with milk.

=== Archaeological zones ===
Zapopan has three important archeological zones: Ixtépete, an archaeological zone consisting of a pyramidal structure of Teotihuacan influence built from the 5th to 10th century, 20 m (66 ft) long, 16 m (52 ft) wide and a height of around 1.83 m (6 ft); El Grillo, which is located north of the Atemajac Valley next to a stream that is currently dry, consisting of fourteen shaft tombs; and the area of La Coronilla, located in the area known as The Experience.

== Sports ==
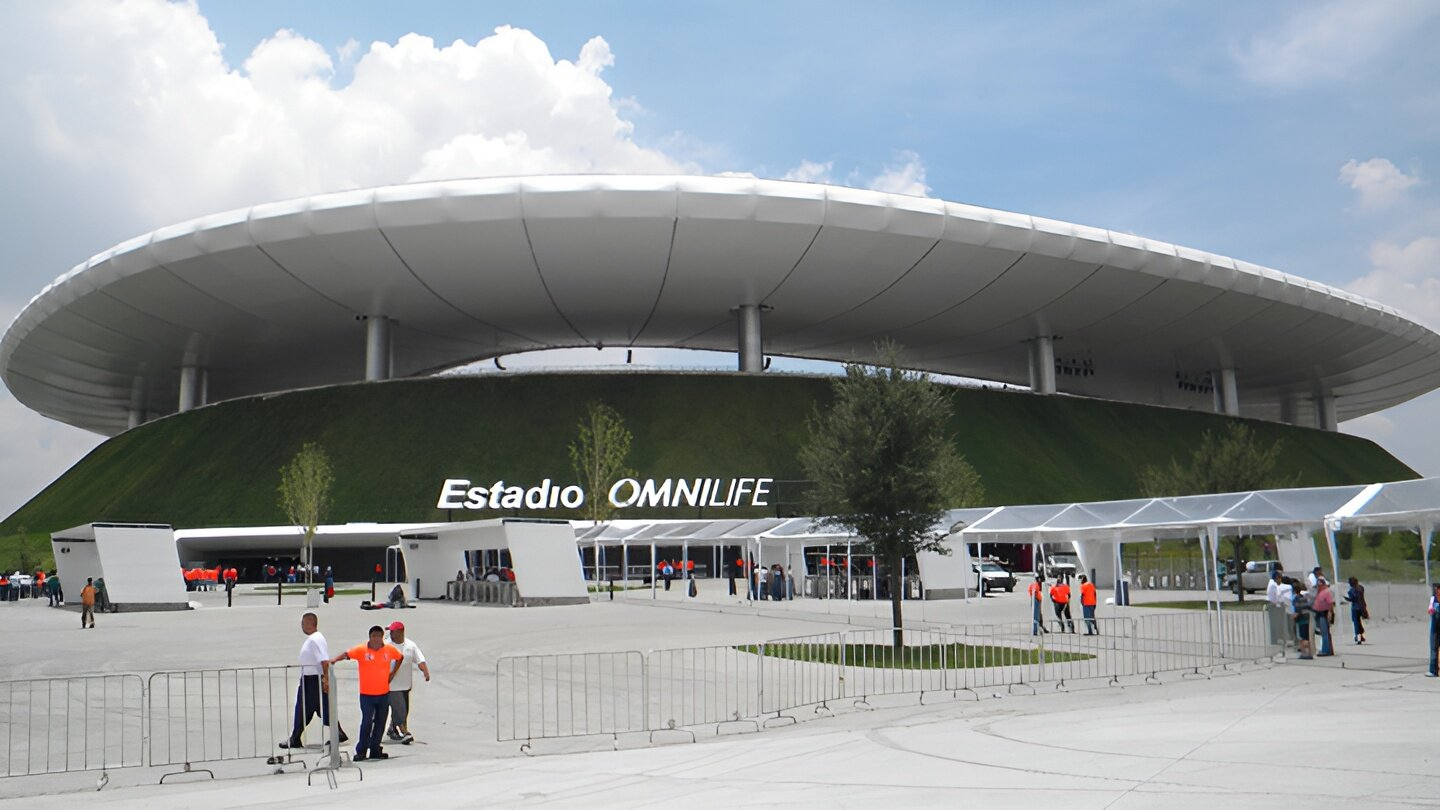
The Estadio Akron football stadium

Many sports are practiced in Zapopan due to the existing urban infrastructure. The Municipal Sports Council (COMUDE) of Zapopan is responsible for promoting physical activity, sport and social recreation, as well as trying to promote the use of sports units in the municipality. The municipality has about 54 sports units for classes, training, and games.

The municipality has been and will host various sporting events of national and international size. In October 2011, Zapopan hosted some of the competitions of the Pan American Games of 2011 held in Guadalajara.

For these competitions the track of the Estadio Panamericano were approved by the International Association of Athletics Federations (IAAF) in 2011, with the idea that it was used by both athletes and the baseball team of the Charros de Jalisco, but in 2015, the head of CODE Jalisco, Andre Marx Miranda, reported that during that year it would only be used by the baseball team. Although it should be expected that after this year it will be reconsidered as originally approved.

The city is home to the Estadio Tres de Marzo, which is the home stadium of Tecos FC, a professional football club playing in the third division in Mexican football (Liga Premier). In addition to this, the Chivas de Guadalajara have the Estadio Chivas which was inaugurated in July 2010 and has witnessed important events such as: the final of Pan American Football: Mexico vs Argentina and Clausura of the Pan American Games Guadalajara 2011, Final of the Copa Libertadores Chivas de Guadalajara vs International Porto Alegre one-way game. and several concerts.

=== Via RecreActiva ===
The Vía RecreActiva in the Municipality of Zapopan, is a social program in which road spaces are enabled for mass use for recreational and recreational purposes by people of all ages. It operates on Sundays from 8:00 a.m. to 2:00 p.m. During said schedule, the circulation of motor vehicles is restricted along established routes, allowing only pedestrians and non-motorized vehicles to pass through.

There are currently three routes in Zapopan:

- 'ROUTE 1: South Extension' (6.4 km [4.0 mi]) Avenida de las Rosas (López Mateos) -Tepeyac-Abogados-Beethoven-Independencia (Metropolitan Park).
- 'ROUTE 2: South Extension' (10 km [6.2 mi]) Labna (Tepeyac) -Amado Nervo-Pegaso-Sagittarius-Galileo Galilei-Mariano Otero-Tepeyac-Las Torres (Guadalupe Avenue).
- 'ROUTE 3: North Extension' (8 km [5.0 mi]) Lienzo Charro Zapopan, Avenida Hidalgo-May 5-Industria-Avenida los Laureles-Dr. Luis Farias-Enrique Díaz de León-Miguel Amaya-Gral. Agustín Olachea-Lic. Luis Manuel Rojas-J. Aguirre E.-Peripheral North-de los Tabachines-Paseo de los Rasmbuesos (promenade of yours).

== Twin towns – sister cities ==
Zapopan is twinned with:

- Antigua Guatemala, Guatemala
- Cartago, Costa Rica
- Changwon, South Korea
- Chengdu, China
- Częstochowa, Poland
- Grand Rapids, Michigan, United States
- Jinan, China
- Marianao (Havana), Cuba
- Rosemead, California, United States
- Saginaw, Michigan, United States
- San Pedro Sula, Honduras
- Montpelier, United States

Domestic cooperation

- Atengo, Jalisco
- Bahía de Banderas, Nayarit
- El Grullo, Jalisco
- Veracruz, Veracruz
- Zapotlán el Grande, Jalisco

Agreements cooperation

- Amsterdam, Netherlands
- Phoenix, United States
- Medellín, Colombia
- Zaragoza, Spain
- Stuttgart, Germany
- Angoulême, France

== See also ==
- Symbols of Zapopan
