= List of municipalities in Mexico by population =

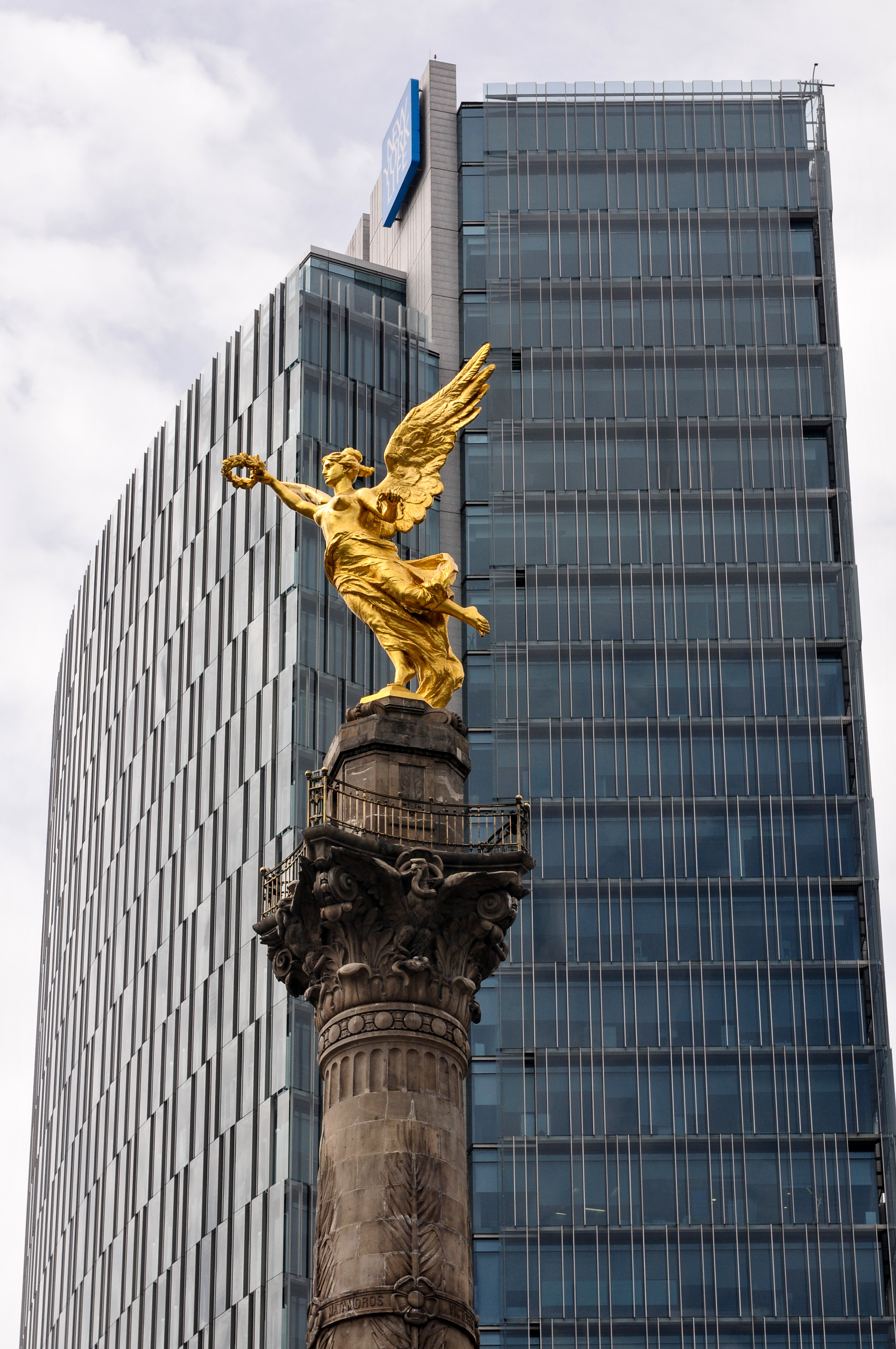
1 – Mexico City.

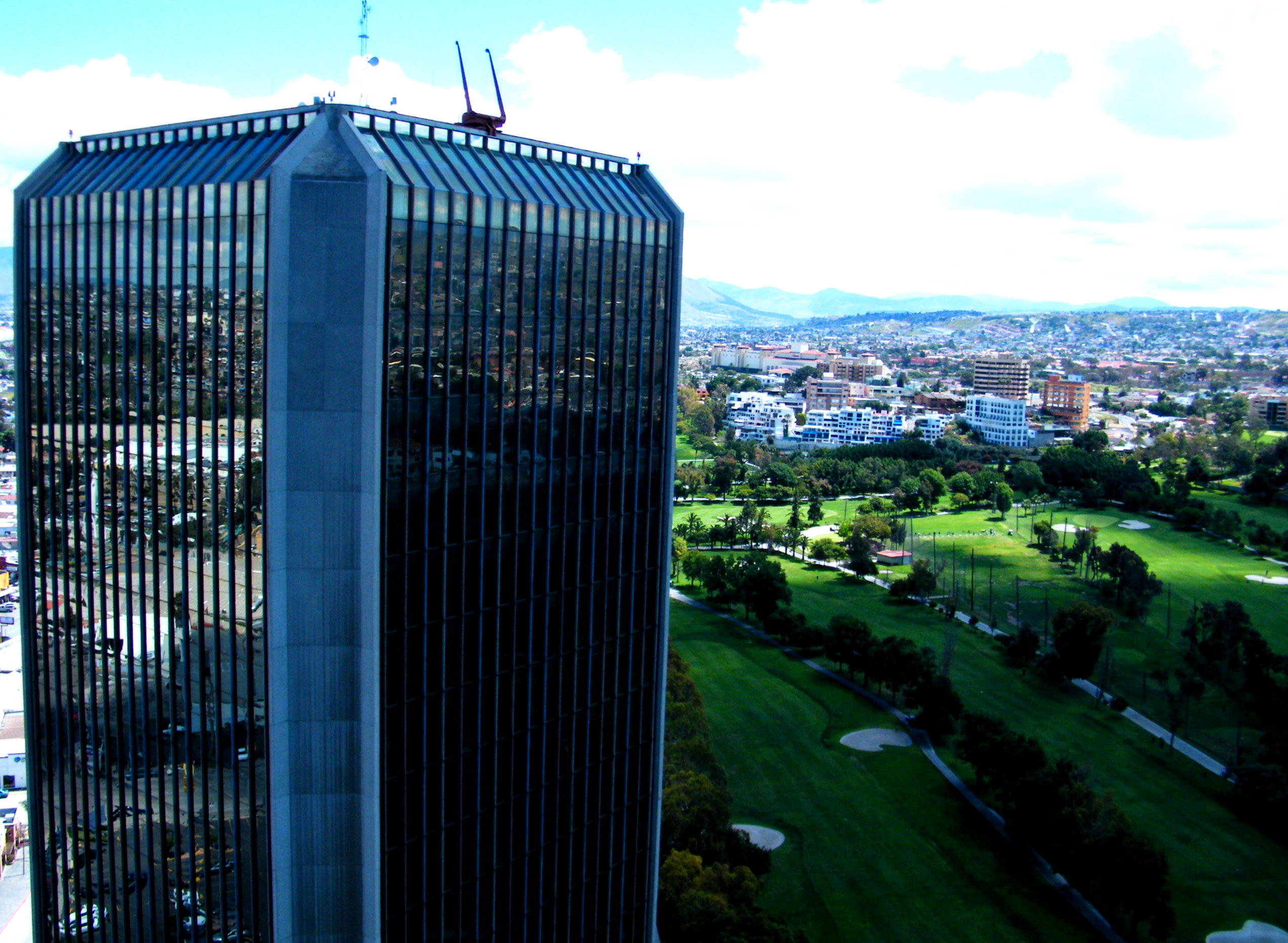
2 - Tijuana.

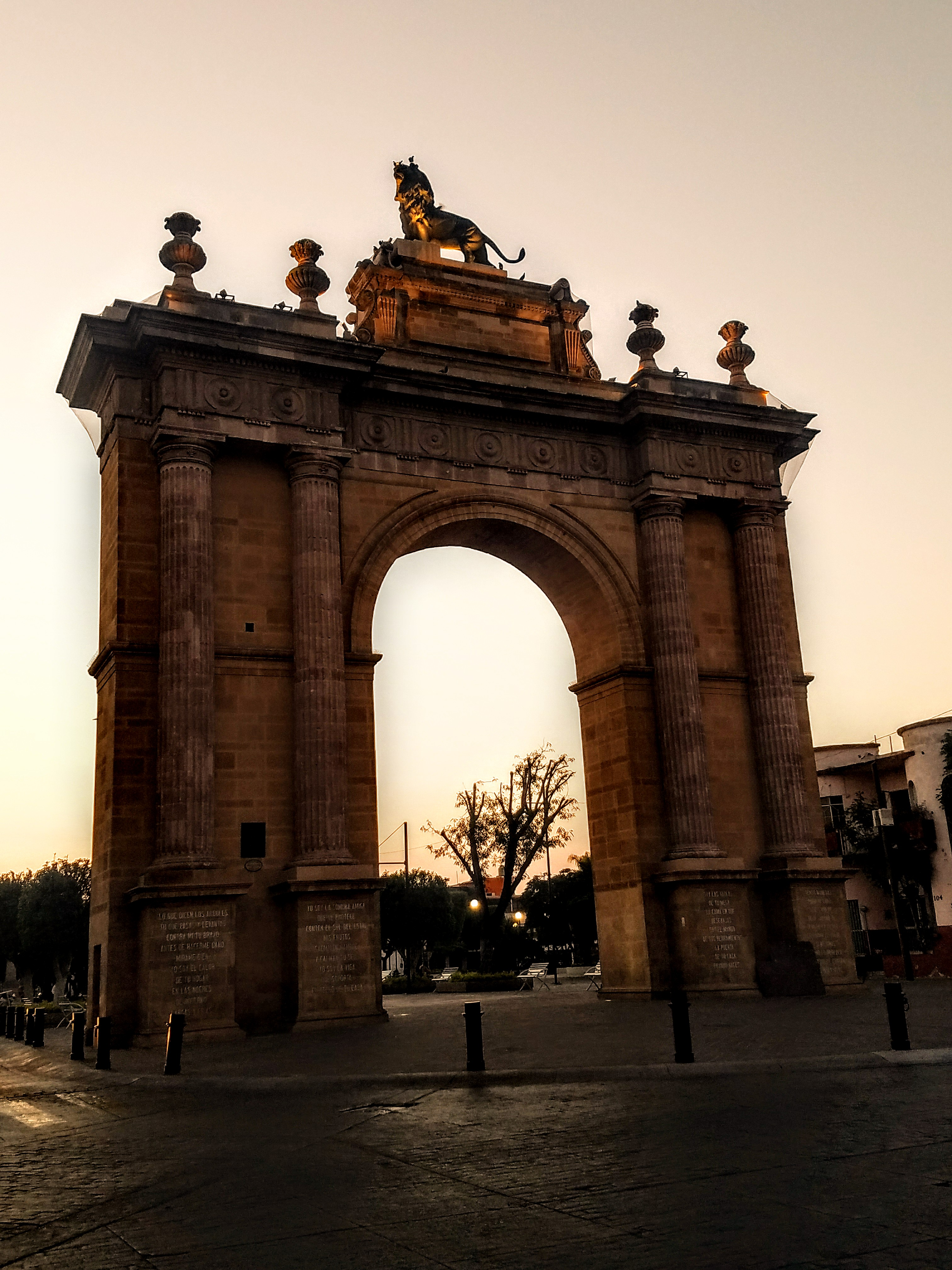
3 – León.

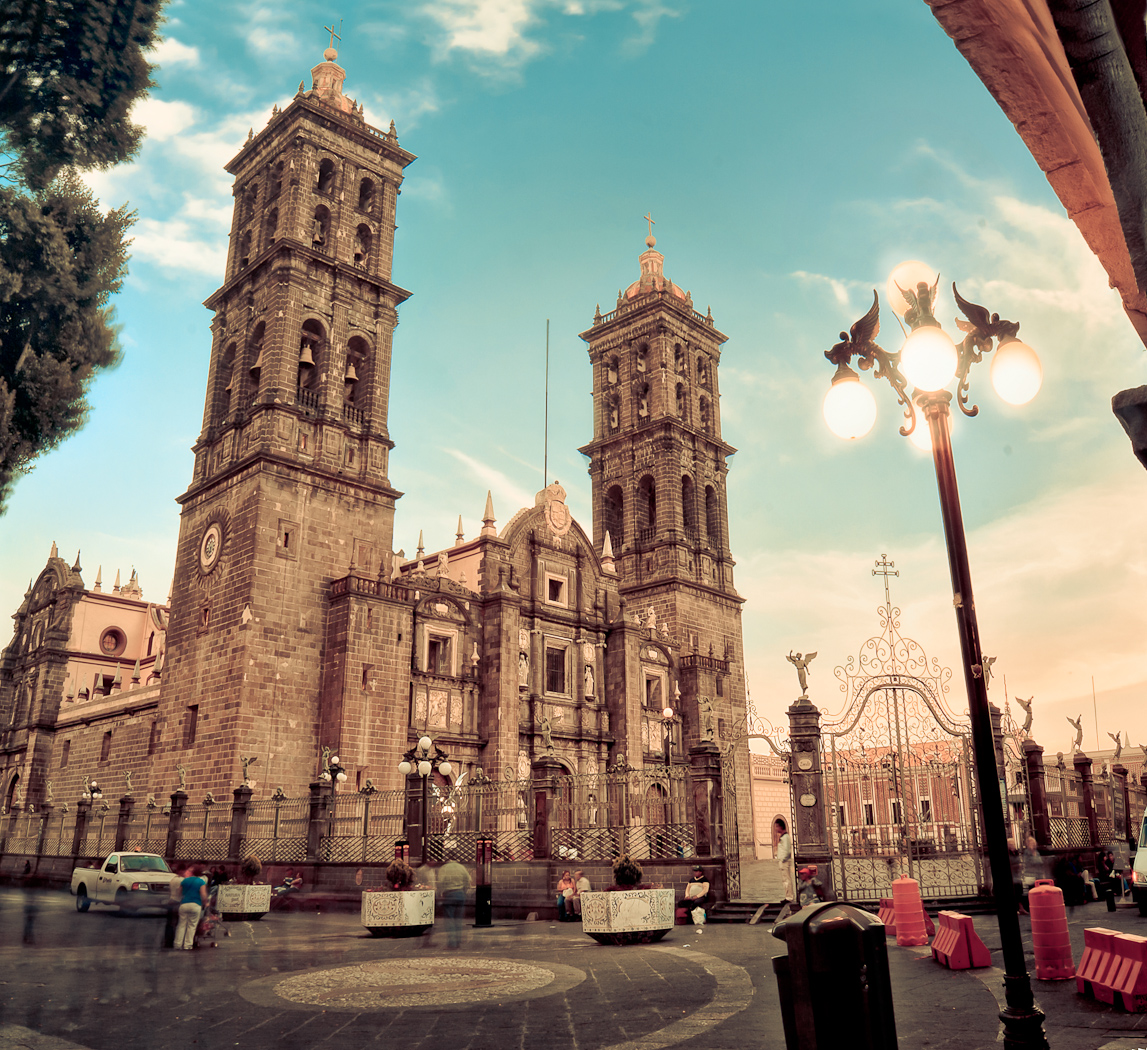
4 – Puebla.

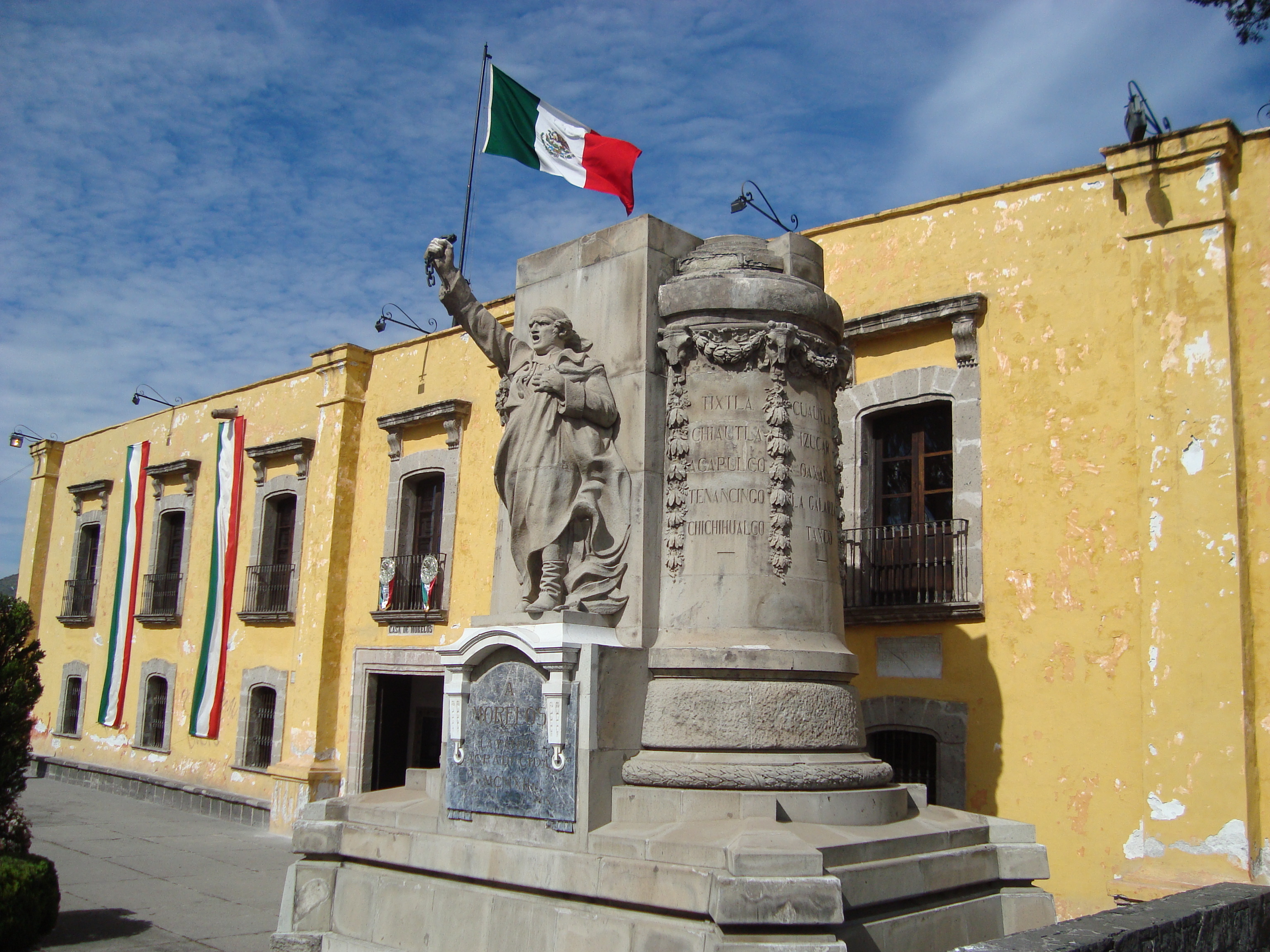
5 - Ecatepec de Morelos.

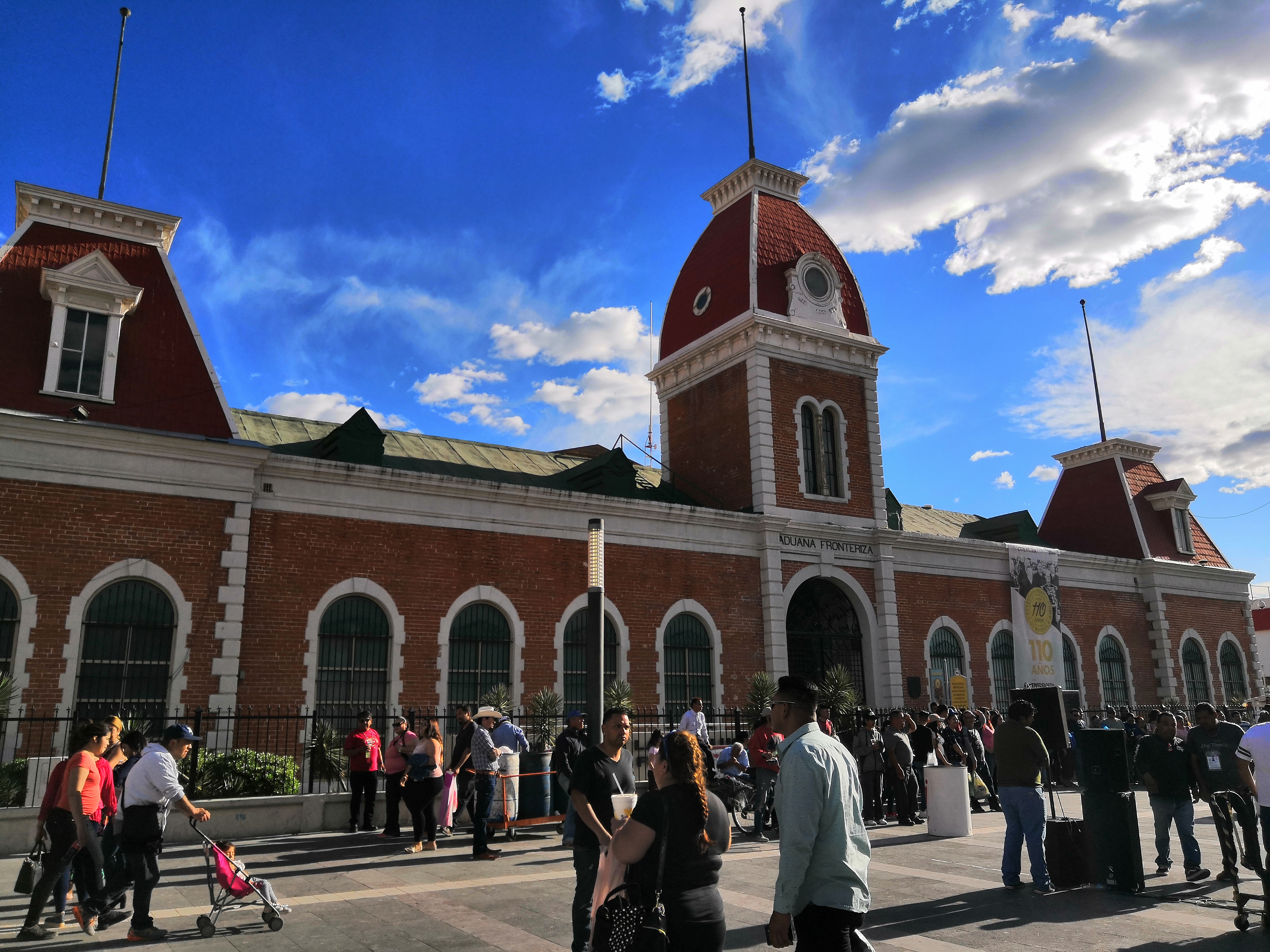
6 – Juárez.

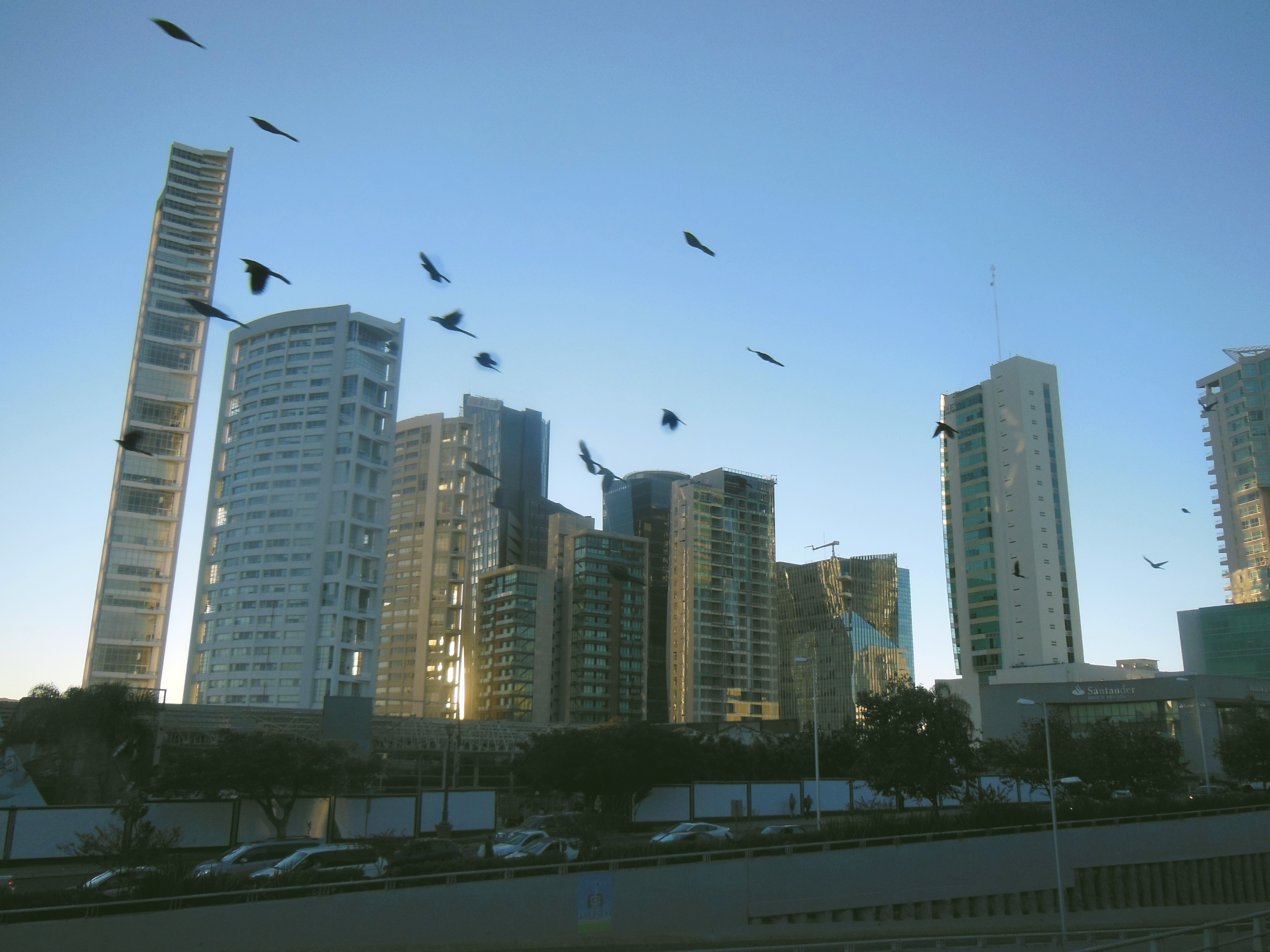
7 - Zapopan.

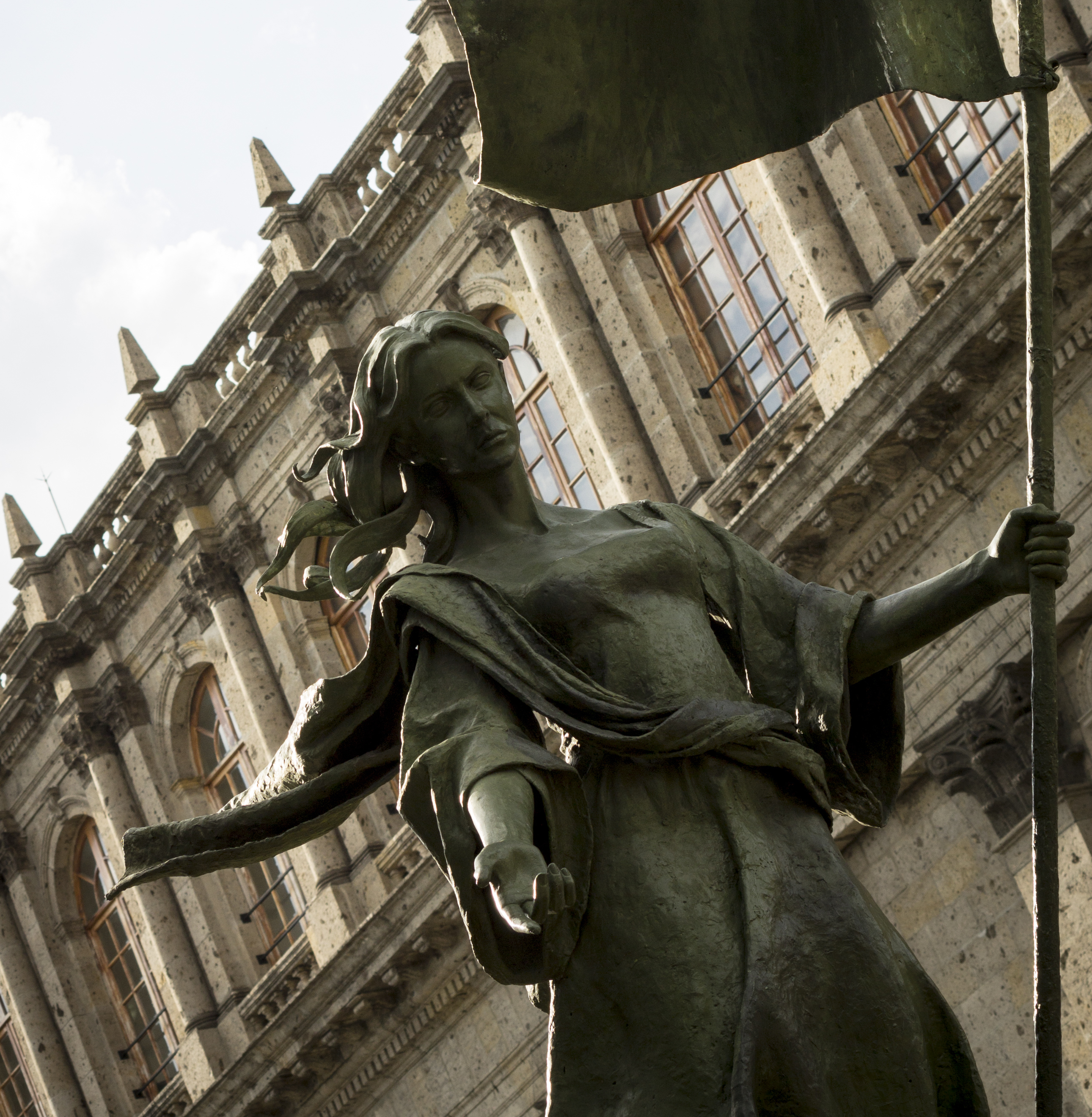
8 - Guadalajara.

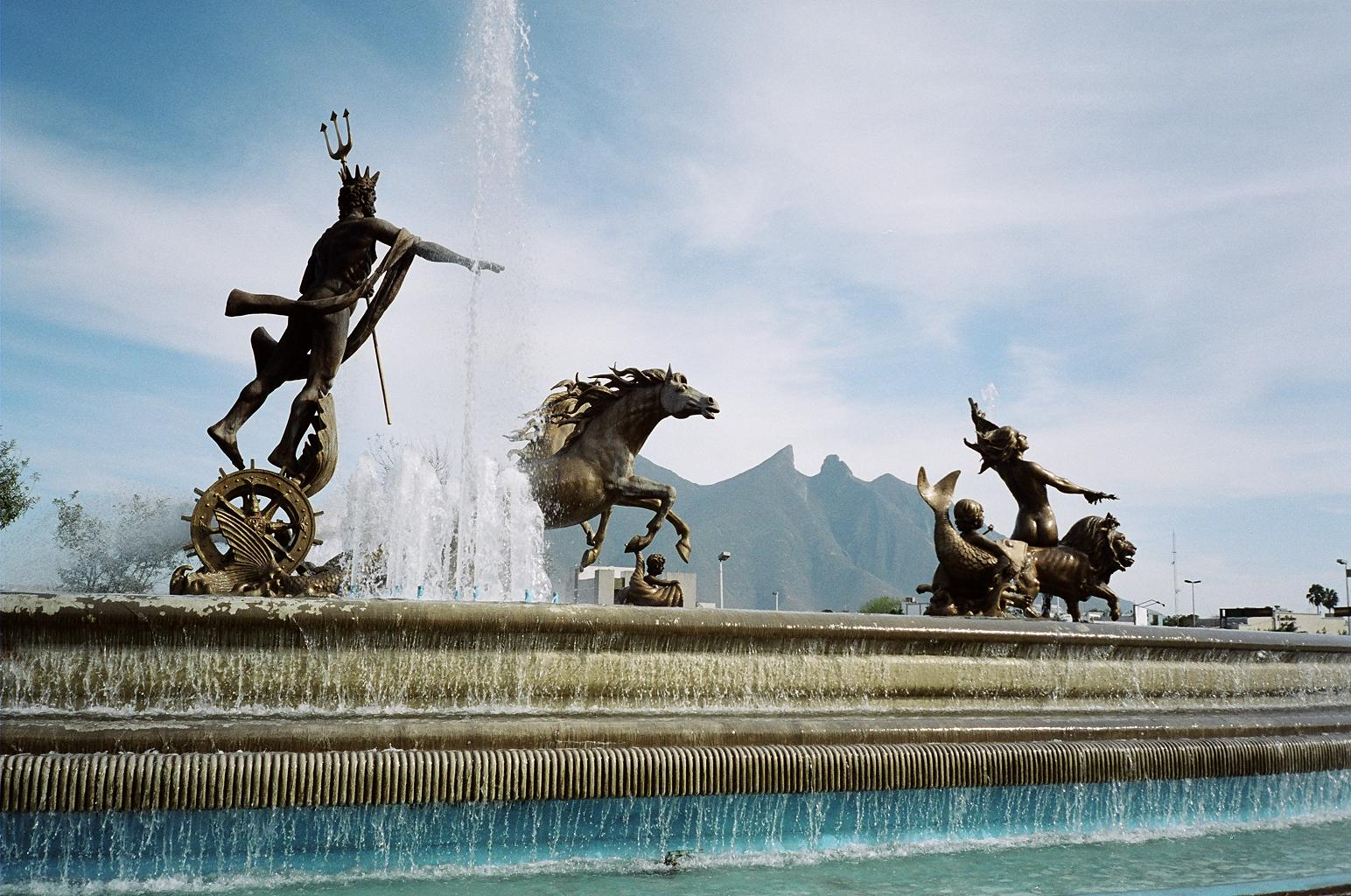
9 - Monterrey.

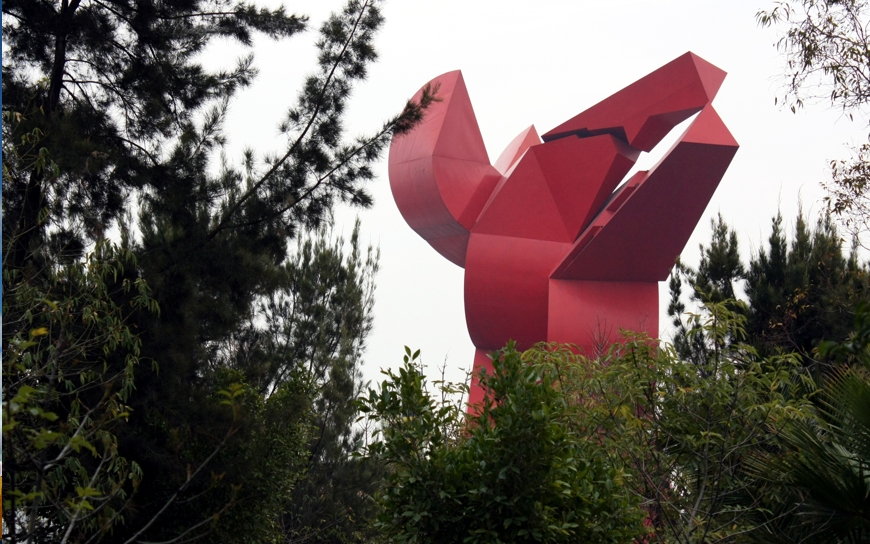
10 - Nezahualcóyotl.

The following is a list of the most populous incorporated places in Mexico (municipalities) according to the 2020 INEGI census.

This list refers only to the population of individual municipalities within their defined limits, which does not include other municipalities or unincorporated suburban areas within urban agglomerations.

Rank	Municipality	State	2020 Census	2010 Census	Change
1	Mexico City	Mexico City	9,209,944	8,851,080	+4.05%
2	Tijuana	Baja California	1,922,523	1,559,683	+23.26%
3	León	Guanajuato	1,721,215	1,436,480	+19.82%
4	Puebla	Puebla	1,692,181	1,539,819	+9.89%
5	Ecatepec	State of Mexico	1,645,352	1,656,107	−0.65%
6	Juárez	Chihuahua	1,512,450	1,332,131	+13.54%
7	Zapopan	Jalisco	1,476,491	1,243,756	+18.71%
8	Guadalajara	Jalisco	1,385,629	1,495,189	−7.33%
9	Monterrey	Nuevo León	1,142,994	1,135,550	+0.66%
10	Nezahualcóyotl	State of Mexico	1,077,208	1,110,565	−3.00%
11	Mexicali	Baja California	1,049,792	936,826	+12.06%
12	Querétaro	Querétaro	1,049,777	801,940	+30.90%
13	Culiacán	Sinaloa	1,003,530	858,638	+16.87%
14	Mérida	Yucatan	995,129	830,732	+19.79%
15	Aguascalientes	Aguascalientes	948,990	797,010	+19.07%
16	Chihuahua	Chihuahua	937,674	819,543	+14.41%
17	Hermosillo	Sonora	936,263	784,342	+19.37%
18	San Luis Potosí	San Luis Potosí	911,908	772,604	+18.03%
19	Benito Juárez	Quintana Roo	911,503	661,176	+37.86%
20	Toluca	State of Mexico	910,608	819,561	+11.11%
21	Saltillo	Coahuila	879,958	725,123	+21.35%
24	Morelia	Michoacán	849,053	729,279	+16.42%
25	Naucalpan	State of Mexico	834,434	833,779	+0.08%
26	Acapulco	Guerrero	779,566	789,971	−1.32%
27	Tlajomulco	Jalisco	727,750	416,626	+74.68%
28	Torreón	Coahuila	720,848	639,629	+12.70%
29	Chimalhuacán	State of Mexico	705,193	614,453	+14.77%
30	Reynosa	Tamaulipas	704,767	608,891	+15.75%
31	Durango	Durango	688,697	582,267	+18.28%
32	Tlaquepaque	Jalisco	687,127	608,114	+12.99%
33	Centro	Tabasco	683,607	640,359	+6.75%
34	Tlalnepantla	State of Mexico	672,202	664,225	+1.20%
35	Apodaca	Nuevo León	656,464	523,270	+25.45%
36	Guadalupe	Nuevo León	643,143	678,006	−5.14%
36	Veracruz	Veracruz	607,209	552,156	+9.97%
37	Tuxtla Gutiérrez	Chiapas	604,147	553,374	+9.18%
38	Irapuato	Guanajuato	592,953	529,440	+12.00%
39	Tonalá	Jalisco	569,913	478,689	+19.06%
40	Cuautitlán Izcalli	State of Mexico	555,163	511,675	+8.50%
41	Tecámac	State of Mexico	547,503	364,589	+50.17%
42	Ixtapaluca	State of Mexico	542,211	467,361	+16.02%
43	Matamoros	Tamaulipas	541,979	489,193	+10.79%
44	Atizapán de Zaragoza	State of Mexico	523,674	489,937	+6.89%
45	Celaya	Guanajuato	521,169	468,469	+11.25%
46	Tultitlán	State of Mexico	516,341	524,074	−1.48%
47	Mazatlán	Sinaloa	501,441	438,434	+14.37%
48	Xalapa	Veracruz	488,531	457,928	+6.68%
49	General Escobedo	Nuevo León	481,213	357,937	+34.44%
50	Juarez	Nuevo León	471,523	256,454	+83.86%
51	Ahome	Sinaloa	459,310	416,299	+10.33%
52	Ensenada‡	Baja California	443,807	466,814	−4.93%
53	Cajeme	Sonora	436,484	409,310	+6.64%
54	Nicolás Romero	State of Mexico	430,601	366,604	+17.46%
55	Tepic	Nayarit	425,924	380,074	+12.06%
55	Nuevo Laredo	Tamaulipas	425,058	384,033	+10.68%
56	San Nicolás de los Garza	Nuevo León	412,199	443,273	−7.01%
57	Chalco	State of Mexico	400,057	310,124	+29.00%
58	García	Nuevo León	397,205	143,668	+176.47%
59	Valle de Chalco	State of Mexico	391,731	357,637	+9.53%
60	Cuernavaca	Morelos	378,476	364,778	+3.76%
61	Gómez Palacio	Durango	372,750	328,159	+13.59%
62	Uruapan	Michoacán	356,786	315,329	+13.15%
63	Tapachula	Chiapas	353,706	320,456	+10.38%
64	Los Cabos	Baja California Sur	351,111	238,487	+47.22%
66	Victoria	Tamaulipas	349,688	321,685	+8.71%
65	Solidaridad	Quintana Roo	333,800	159,310	+109.53%
66	Soledad	San Luis Potosí	332,072	267,839	+23.98%
67	Tehuacán	Puebla	327,312	274,907	+19.06%
68	Pachuca	Hidalgo	314,331	267,862	+17.35%
69	Coatzacoalcos	Veracruz	310,698	305,225	+1.79%
70	Santa Catarina	Nuevo León	306,322	270,790	+13.12%
71	La Paz	State of Mexico	304,088	253,843	+19.79%
72	San Juan del Rio	Querétaro	297,804	241,699	+23.21%
73	Tampico	Tamaulipas	297,562	297,057	+0.17%
74	Campeche	Campeche	294,077	259,005	+13.54%
75	Coacalco de Berriozábal	State of Mexico	293,444	278,203	+5.48%
76	La Paz	Baja California Sur	292,241	251,871	+16.03%
77	Puerto Vallarta	Jalisco	291,839	255,725	+14.12%
78	Guasave	Sinaloa	289,370	285,919	+1.21%
79	Huixquilucan	State of Mexico	284,965	242,167	+17.67%
80	Chilpancingo	Guerrero	283,354	241,717	+17.23%
81	Zumpango	State of Mexico	280,455	159,647	+75.67%
82	Texcoco	State of Mexico	277,562	235,151	+18.04%
83	Salamanca	Guanajuato	273,417	260,759	+4.85%
84	Oaxaca	Oaxaca	270,955	263,145	+2.97%
85	Altamira	Tamaulipas	269,790	212,001	+27.26%
86	Nogales	Sonora	264,782	220,292	+20.20%
87	Carmen	Campeche	248,845	221,094	+12.55%
88	Cardenas	Tabasco	243,229	248,507	−2.12%
89	Metepec	State of Mexico	242,307	214,162	+13.14%
90	Fresnillo	Zacatecas	240,532	213,139	+12.85%
91	Monclova	Coahuila	237,951	216,206	+10.06%
92	Ocosingo	Chiapas	234,661	198,877	+17.99%
93	Othón P. Blanco‡‡	Quintana Roo	233,648	244,616	−4.48%
94	El Salto	Jalisco	232,852	138,226	+68.46%
95	El Marqués	Querétaro	231,668	116,458	+98.93%
96	San Cristobal de las Casas	Chiapas	215,874	185,917	+16.11%
97	Jiutepec	Morelos	215,357	196,953	+9.34%
98	Comalcalco	Tabasco	214,877	192,802	+11.45%
99	Corregidora	Querétaro	212,567	143,073	+48.57%
100	Guadalupe	Zacatecas	211,740	159,991	+32.34%
101	Ciudad Madero	Tamaulipas	205,933	197,216	+4.42%
102	Zamora	Michoacán	204,860	186,102	+10.08%

‡ A new municipality, San Quintín, was created out of Ensenada's territory in February 2020. ‡‡ A new municipality, Bacalar, was created out of Othon P. Blanco's territory in February 2011.

== See also ==
- Municipalities of Mexico
- List of cities in Mexico
- List of most populous cities in Mexico by decade
- Metropolitan areas of Mexico
- Demographics of Mexico
