= Arcos de Zapopan =

Monument in Zapopan, Jalisco, Mexico

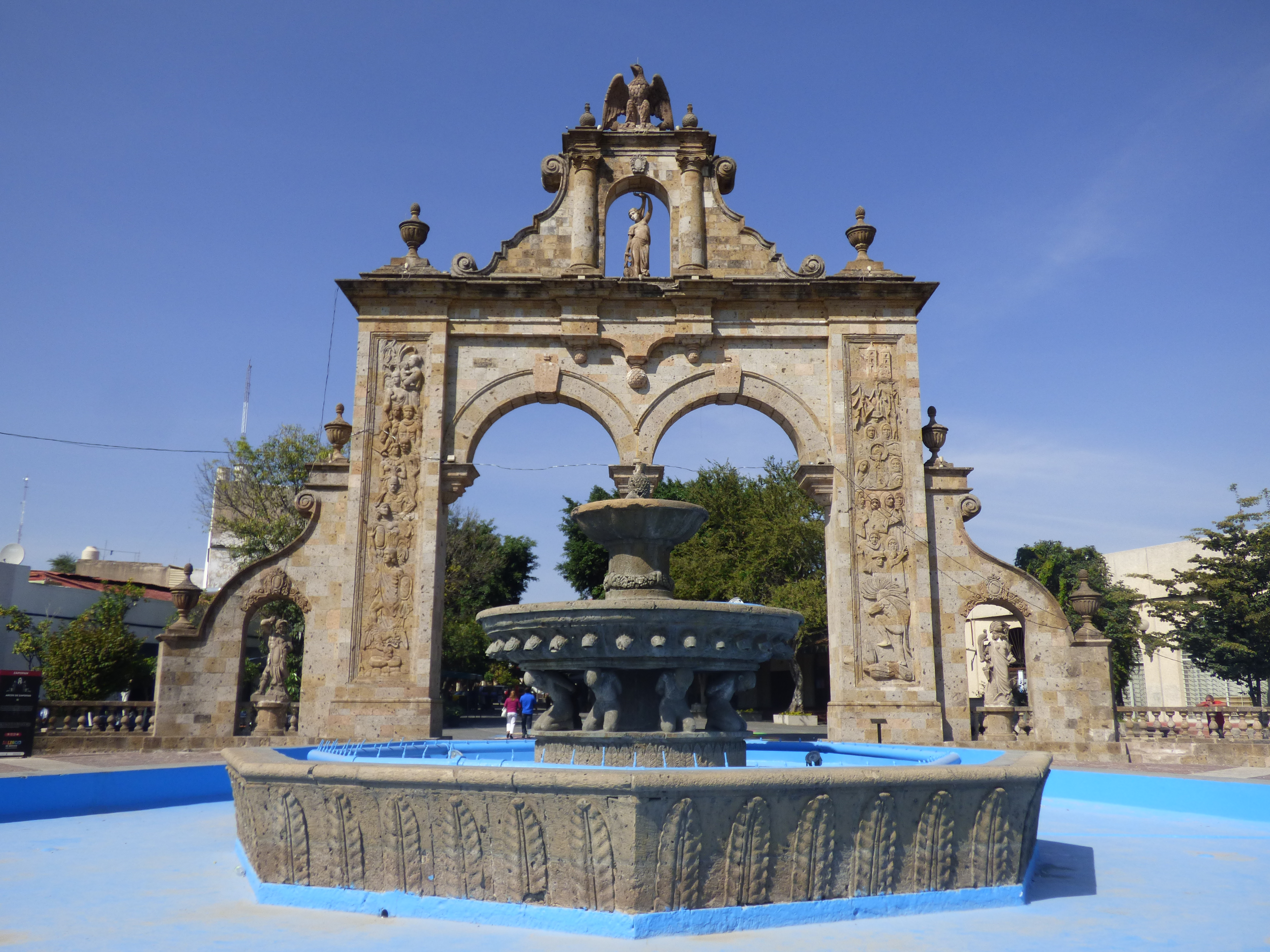
- The arches in 2015
- Location: Zapopan, Jalisco, Mexico
- Coordinates: 20°43′13″N 103°23′16″W
- Designer: Guillermo González and Ma. del Carmen Rábago
- Type: Colonial monument
- Material: Limestone
- Height: 20.4 m (67 ft)

Arcos de Zapopan is a limestone monument in Zapopan, in the Mexican state of Jalisco.
