= Torta ahogada =

Pork birote bread sandwich in chile de árbol sauce

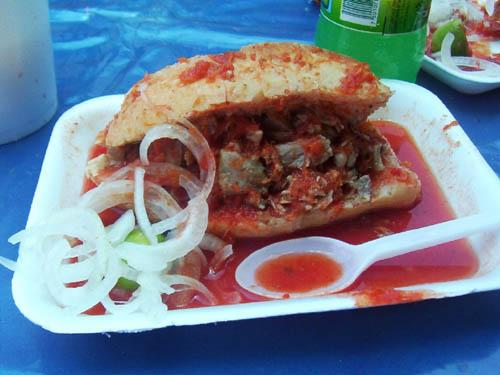
- Type: Sandwich
- Place of origin: Mexico
- Region or state: Guadalajara
- Main ingredients: Birote salado bread (or bolillo depending on availability), sauce (dried chili peppers), fried pork or chicken or beans

A torta ahogada (Spanish pronunciation: [ˈtoɾta aoˈɣaða], drowned submarine sandwich) is a typical dish from the Mexican state of Jalisco, particularly in the city of Guadalajara. Although it is popular in some other parts of Mexico, it is most popular in Guadalajara. It is called "drowned" because the sandwich is submerged totally or partially in a sauce consisting of vinegar, cumin, and a dried chili pepper called chile de árbol. Less spicy versions of the sandwich, made with a tomato-based sauce, are also available.

== History ==
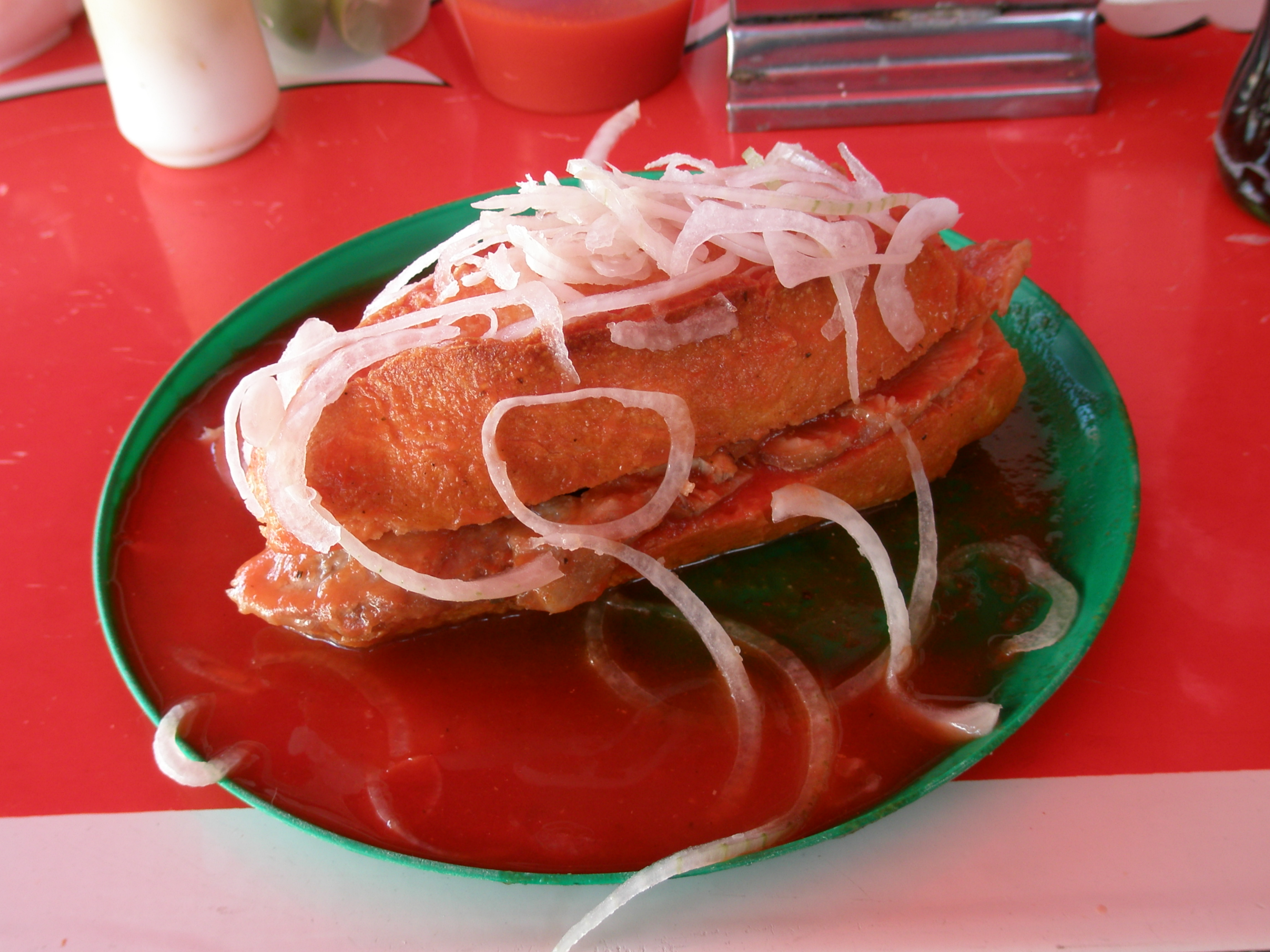
Torta ahogada

Tortas ahogadas are made with birote bread, characteristic of the region. Specifically, they are made with birote salado (Mexican sourdough bread), which has a thick, crunchy crust and softer interior, which is more salty than sweet. The consistency of the bread permits the sandwich to be submerged in sauce without crumbling or dissolving (which usually happens if using bolillo), so it is crunchy and moist at the same time.

Legend has it that when the French invaded Guadalajara in 1864, a French Sergeant, Camille Perrault, wanted to teach the Guadalajarans how to make French bread, but did not have any yeast. The warm, wet climate enabled him to make sourdough, however, resulting in Jalisco's unique birote bread. The name "birote" originated because it was the closest approximation to the pronunciation of "Perrault" by Mexicans at the time.

The bread is sliced open on one side and the sandwich is filled with shredded pork (or carnitas), refried beans, and onions. Fillings of shrimp, chicken and cheese are sometimes available. The sandwiches are often served with sliced onions, radishes, avocados and chili peppers.

The sauce can be either spicy or mild. The first is based on ground arbol chilies, vinegar, garlic, oregano, and other spices. Sweet sauce, which is considerably less spicy, is made of red tomatoes and chili peppers. If the sandwich is ordered "media ahogada" or "half drowned", it is dipped partially in the sauce. If the sandwich is "bien ahogada" or "well drowned", the bread and meat are completely submerged in the sauce until no bubbles emerge.

It is traditional to eat tortas ahogadas in Estadio Jalisco, the football stadium in Guadalajara, in spite of the difficulty in consuming them. They are usually eaten with bare hands, even though tortas ahogadas are messy due to the large amount of sauce used. This delicacy is usually available from street vendors, but it can also be found in restaurants. The origin of the torta ahogada was an accident, according to local lore, when a street vendor, De La Torre at Tortas Ahogadas El Güero dropped a sandwich into salsa. The legacy of the original stand continues at Tortas Ahogadas El Güerito.

The torta ahogada is often said to hold a special place in the hearts of many people who are from Guadalajara or have spent time there. Some people go to great lengths to seek out tortas ahogadas in places outside of the region. The people from Guadalajara claim that no one really visits Guadalajara without making a stop to try a torta ahogada.

== See also ==
- List of sandwiches
- Pambazo
