= History of science and technology in Mexico =

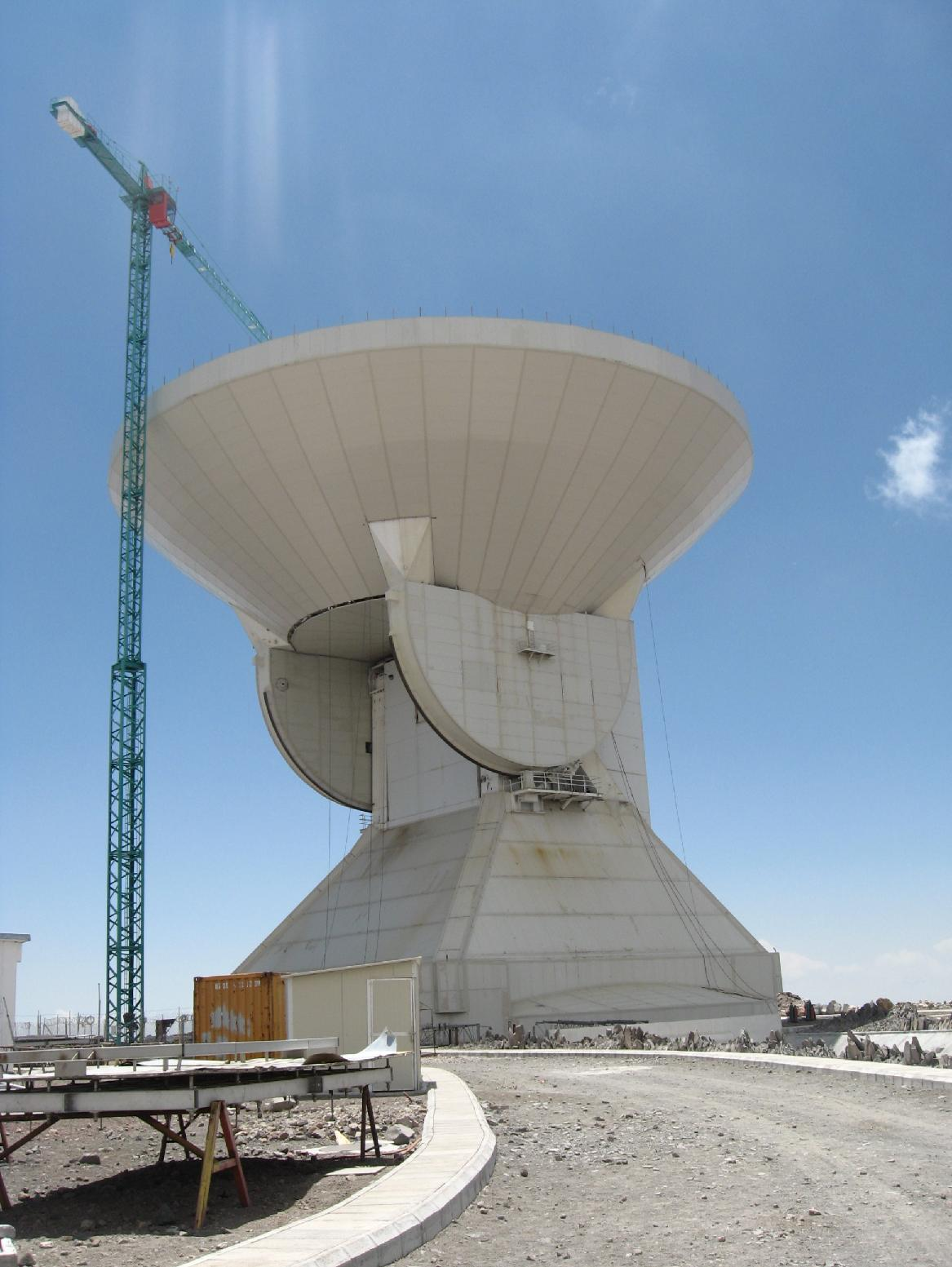
The AEM agency aims to coordinate the space activities that are performed in the country, such as those developed around the Large Millimeter Telescope in the state of Puebla.

The history of science and technology in Mexico spans many years.

Indigenous Mesoamerican civilizations developed mathematics, astronomy, and calendrics, and solved technological problems of water management for agriculture and flood control in Central Mexico.

Following the Spanish conquest in 1521, New Spain (colonial Mexico) was brought into the European sphere of science and technology. The Royal and Pontifical University of Mexico, established in 1551, was a hub of intellectual and religious development in colonial Mexico for over a century. During the Spanish American Enlightenment in Mexico, the colony made considerable progress in science, but following the war of independence and political instability in the early nineteenth century, progress stalled.

During the late 19th century under the regime of Porfirio Díaz, the process of industrialization began in Mexico. Following the Mexican Revolution, a ten-year civil war, Mexico made significant progress in science and technology. During the 20th century, new universities, such as the National Polytechnical Institute, Monterrey Institute of Technology and research institutes, such as those at the National Autonomous University of Mexico, were established in Mexico.

According to the World Bank, Mexico is Latin America's largest exporter of high-technology goods (High-technology exports are manufactured goods that involve high R&D intensity, such as in aerospace, computers, pharmaceuticals, scientific instruments, and electrical machinery) with $40.7 billion worth of high-technology goods exports in 2012. Mexican high-technology exports accounted for 17% of all manufactured goods in the country in 2012 according to the World Bank.

== Indigenous civilizations ==
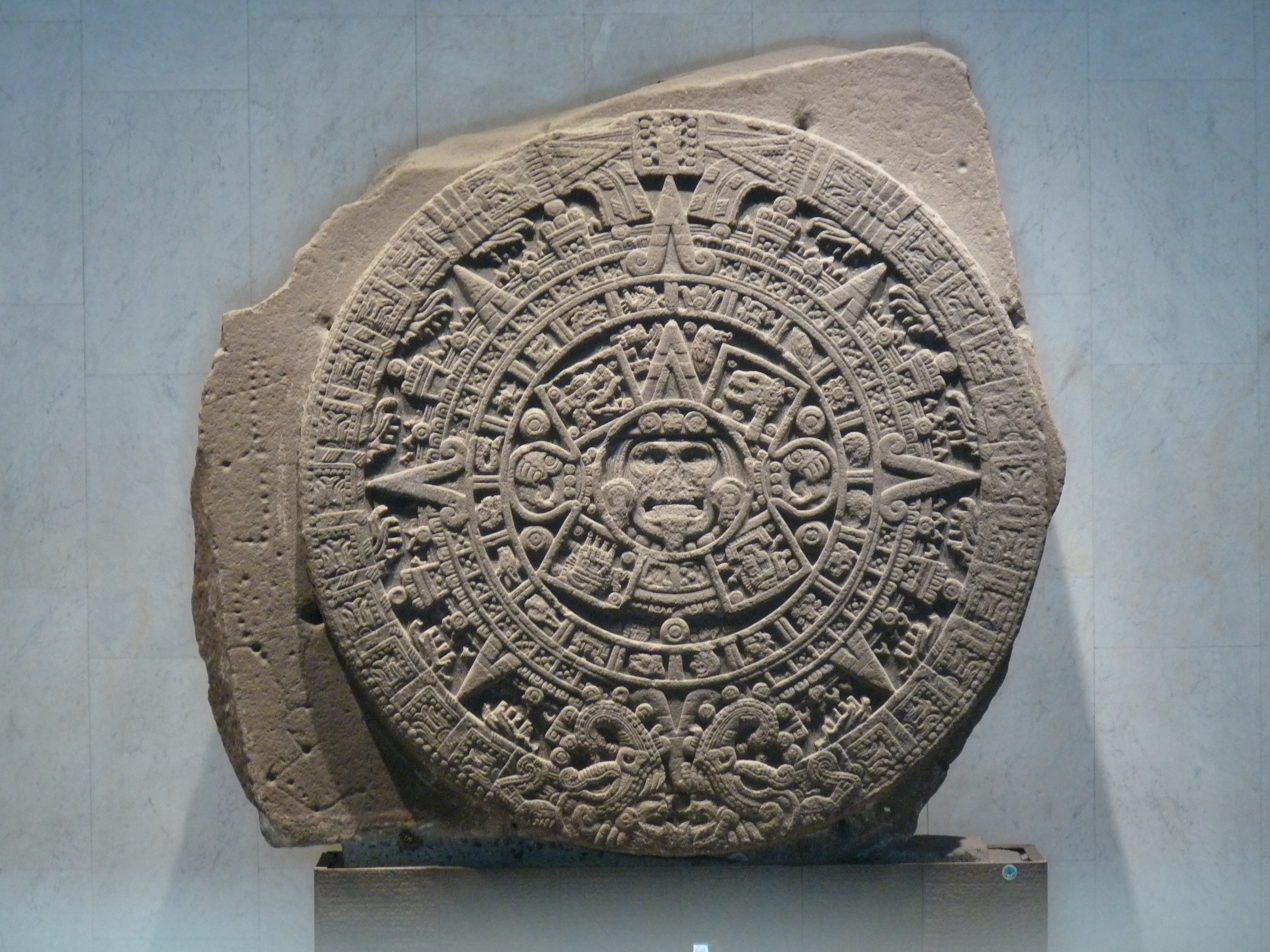
The Aztec Sun Stone, also called the Aztec Calendar Stone, on display at the National Museum of Anthropology, Mexico City

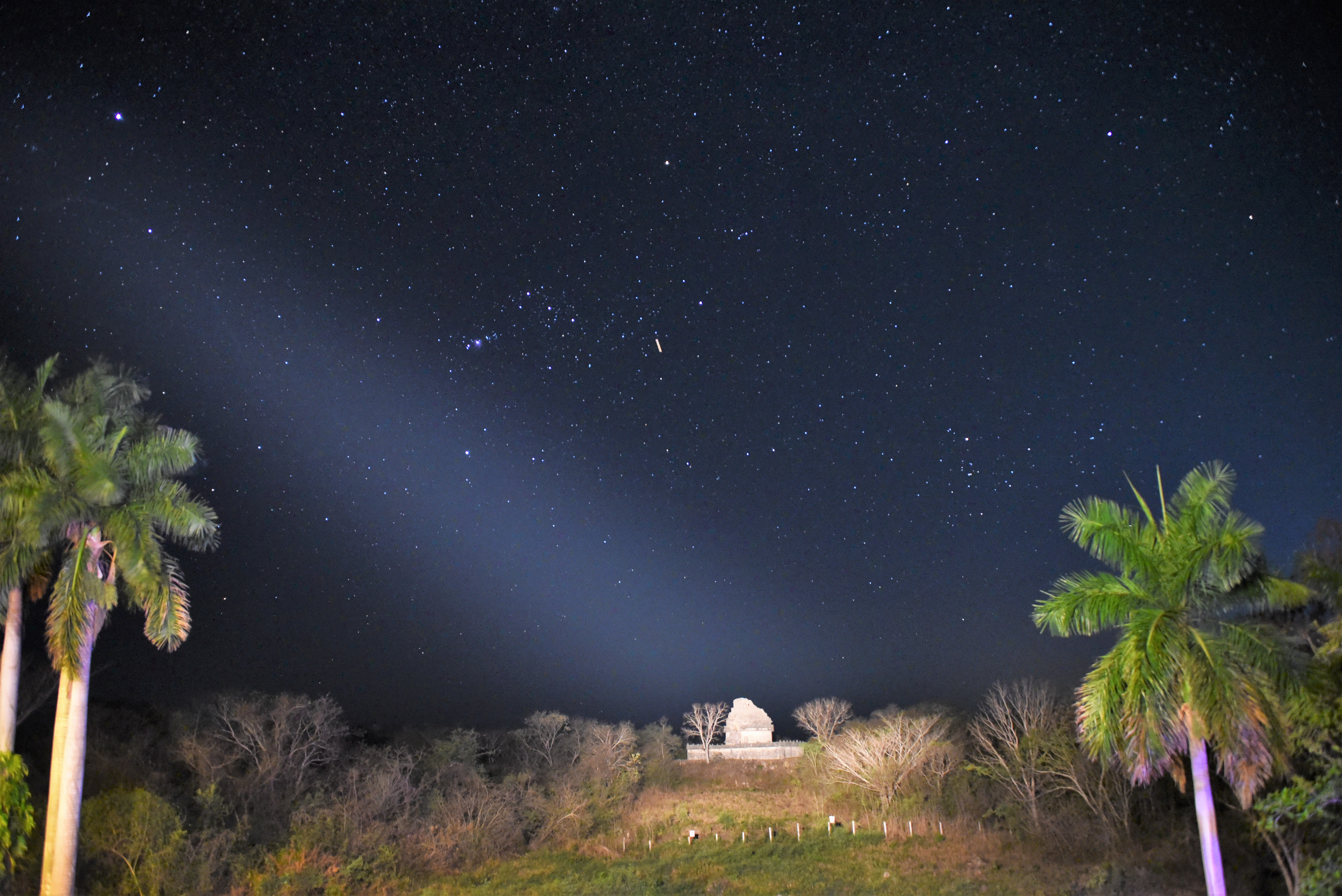
El Caracol, Chichen Itza ancient observatory structure constructed by the Maya civilization

The Olmec, a Pre-Columbian civilization living in the tropical lowlands of south-central Mexico, calendar system required an advanced understanding of mathematics. The Olmec number system was based on 20 instead of decimal and used three symbols- a dot for one, a bar for five, and a shell-like symbol for zero. The concept of zero is one of the Olmecs' greatest achievements. It permitted numbers to be written by position and allowed for complex calculations. Although the invention of zero is often attributed to the Mayans, it was originally conceived by the Olmecs.

To predict planting and harvesting times, early peoples studied the movements of the sun, stars, and planets. They used this information to make calendars. The Aztecs created two calendars- one for farming, and one for religion. The farming calendar let them know when to plant and to harvest crops. An Aztec calendar stone dug up in Mexico City in 1790 includes information about the months of the year and pictures of the sun god at the center.

== Colonial era ==
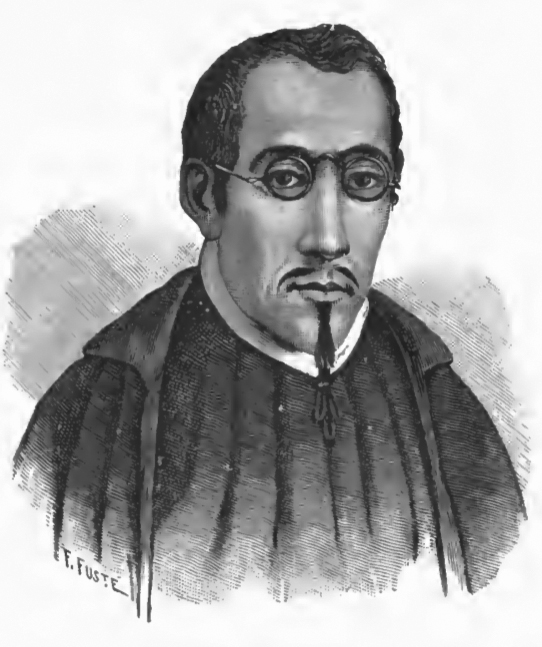
Carlos de Sigüenza y Góngora: Jesuit polymath who contributed to astronomy and mathematics.

After the Viceroyalty of New Spain was founded, the Spanish brought the scientific culture that dominated Spain to the Viceroyalty of New Spain.

The Franciscan order founded the first school of higher learning in the Americas, the Colegio de Santa Cruz de Tlatelolco in 1536, at the site of an Aztec school.

The municipal government (cabildo) of Mexico City formally requested the Spanish crown to establish a university in 1539. The Royal and Pontifical University of Mexico (Real y Pontificia Universidad de México) was established in 1551. The university was administered by the clergy and it was the official university of the empire. It provided quality education for the people, and it was a hub of intellectual and religious development in the region. It taught subjects such as physics and mathematics from the perspective of Aristotelian philosophy. Augustinian philosopher Alonso Gutiérrez in 1553 he became the first professor of the University of Mexico. He wrote Physical speculation, the first scientific text in the Americas, in 1557. By the late 18th century, the university had trained 1,162 doctors, 29,882 bachelors, and many lawyers.

Pedro Lopez, a physician to King Philip II was sent to New Spain in order to write a medical history of the nation. He spent seven years on his work. He made descriptions and drawings of Novhispanic flora and fauna, and experimented with Indigenous remedies. He returned to Spain with the results of his work in 1577. The book was bound and stored in the archives of the Escorial only to be mostly lost when fire afflicted the palace in 1671. An abridged version however was saved and was published by Federico Cesi. Back in Mexico a Dominican lay brother named Francisco Jiménez translated the abridgement from Latin to Spanish. It was composed of four books: the first three relating to plants, and the fourth relating to animals and minerals.

Alonso López de Hinojosos, the physician at the Royal Hospital of Indians conducted many autopsies during the epidemic of 1576 in order to understand more the nature of the Cocoliztli disease. He also wrote textbooks on surgery. During that same epidemic, Juan de la Fuente, professor of medicine at the University of Mexico convoked all of the local physicians in order to further understand the disease.

Carlos de Sigüenza y Góngora was a Mexican Jesuit poet, a philosopher, a mathematician, a historian, and antiquarian. He studied astronomy, physics, and mathematics at Tepotzotlán College. He was at one point invited to visit the court of Louis XIV. He abandoned Aristotelianism and adopted Cartesianism. He also advocated a naturalistic explanation for comets, free from superstition.

In 1693 Viceory Galve nominated Sigüenza to form part of a scientific expedition tasked with exploring the Gulf of Mexico. Siguena accepted and published his findings in a treatise. He also wrote treatises on astronomy and geometry.

=== Bourbon Reforms ===
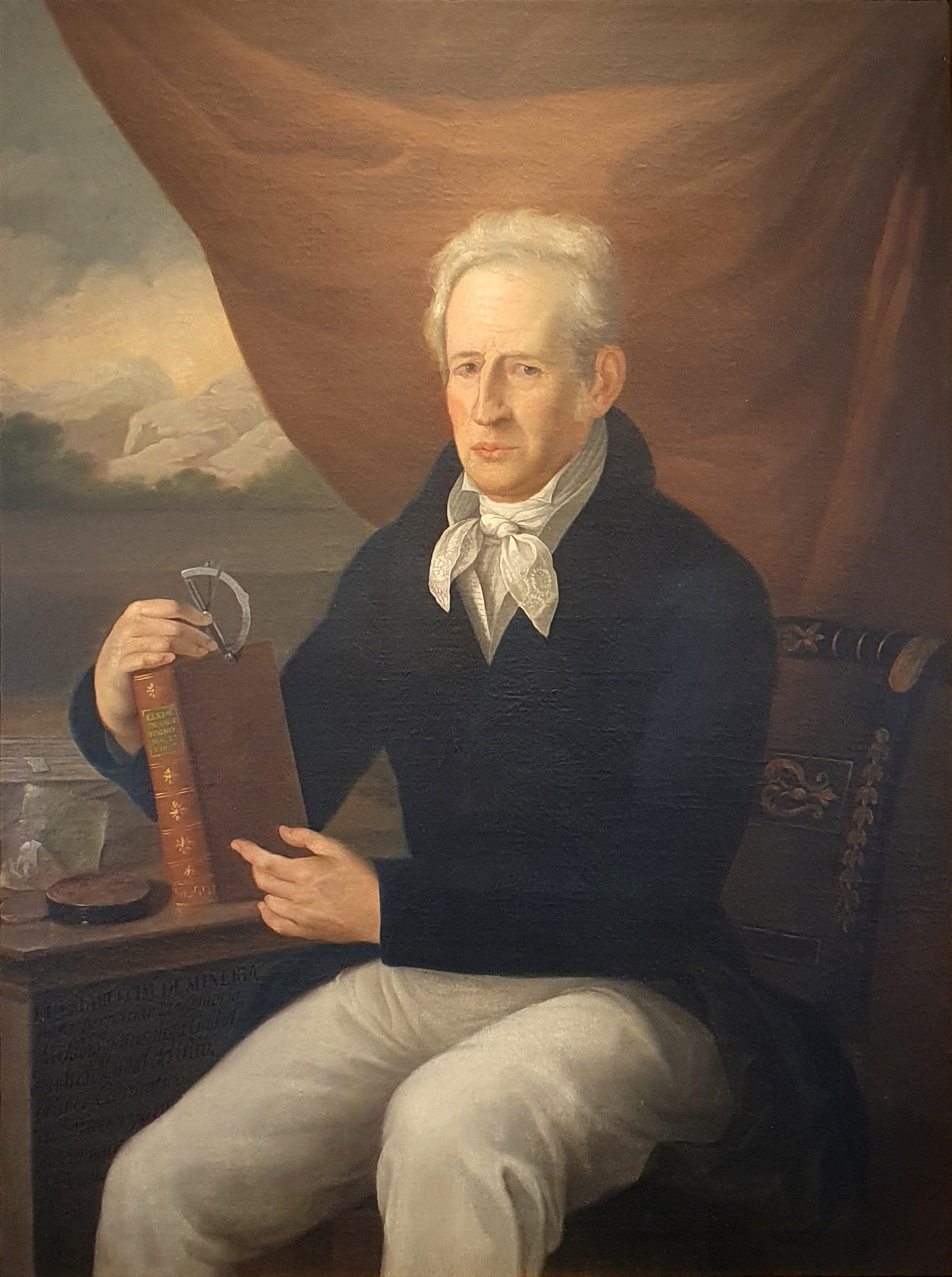
Andrés Manuel del Río, who first isolated the element vanadium through his work in the Mexican mining industry

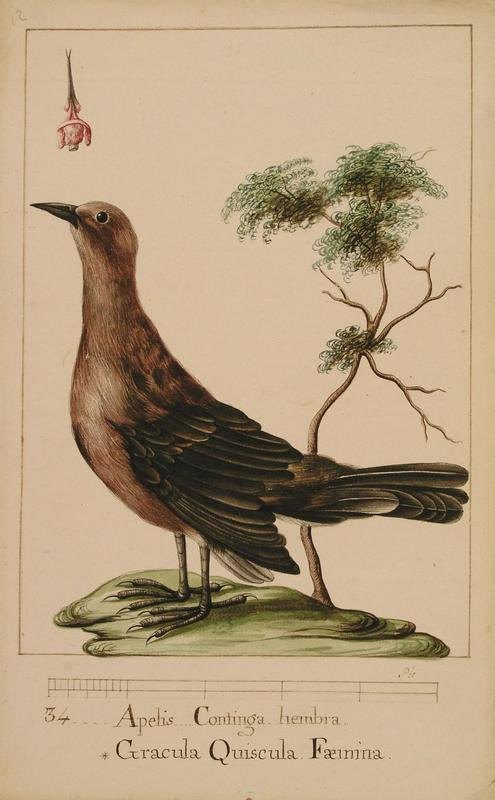
A slender-billed grackle from the works of the naturalist José Mariano Mociño

In the early 18th century, the War of Spanish Succession ended with the rule of Spain passing over from the House of Habsburg over to the French House of Bourbon. The new ruling family inaugurated a program of government improvements known as the Bourbon Reforms which also affected the colonies and inaugurated the era of Spanish American Enlightenment. Regardless, the 1767 expulsion of Jesuits, who had been key in the fields of Mexican science and education, helped to antagonize the Creoles. In 1792 the Seminary of Mining was established. Later it became the College of Mining, in which the first modern physics laboratory in Mexico was established. Andrés Manuel del Río and Fausto Elhuyar arrived from Spain to join the faculty. It taught courses on topography, geodesy, mineralogy, and other sciences. Shortly before a botanical garden had also been established which also taught a course on botany.

Notable scientists during this era included José Antonio de Alzate y Ramírez and Andrés Manuel del Río. Río discovered the chemical element vanadium in 1801.

During this era Francisco Xavier Gamboa was a jurist who also expressed interest in science. After being tasked with compiling reports for the government of New Spain he studied mathematics and mining and wrote a treatise on mining engineering.

Antonio de León y Gama wrote reports on the moons of Jupiter, the climate of New Spain, and helped to precisely calculate the longitude of Mexico. He also wrote a report on the Aztec sun stone.

Joaquín Velázquez de León's scientific reputation earned the praise of Alexander von Humboldt. He studied the works of Francis Bacon and Isaac Newton and specialized in mathematics, geodesy, and astronomy.

Velázquez de León built scientific instruments not available in New Spain and accompanied José de Gálvez on his expedition to Sonora. He also made expeditions into the Californias where the clear skies of those regions allowed him to make many astronomical observations, including a transit of Venus in 1769, which allowed him to measure the distance from the Earth to the Sun. Accompanying him on that occasion was Jean-Baptiste Chappe d'Auteroche, the French priest and geometer. While in the Californias he precisely calculated their longitudes and latitudes. In 1773, he also precisely calculated the longitude and latitude of Mexico City.

Through triangulation between Peñón de los Baños, to Huehuetoca, Velázquez de León drew up topographical charts for the region. He was also commissioned to work on projects related to mining by the government of New Spain.

José Antonio de Alzate y Ramírez conducted many experiments, regarding electricity and meteorology. In 1789, he recorded observations regarding a rare occurrence of the aurora borealis in Mexico. He was also an avid naturalist, cataloging many Mexican plants and animals, and studying the migration patterns of birds. He however has also been criticized for not using the nascent Linnaean taxonomy.

During the reign of Charles III, Alejandro Malaspina and Dionisio Alcalá Galiano and Antonio Valdés y Fernández Bazán were tasked with carrying out expeditions to explore the northwest coast of New Spain.

José Mariano Mociño studied at the Botanic Garden in 1789. Mociño had accompanied Martín Sessé y Lacasta in the scientific expedition ordered by Charles IV in 1795 tasked with surveying New Spain's plant life. The expedition lasted eight years. Mociño traveled over three thousand leagues ultimately producing a report titled Mexican Flora which was then sent to the Real Jardín Botánico de Madrid. The Swiss naturalist Augustin Pyramus de Candolle was an admirer of the work, and when Mociño travelled to Spain to access his volume, a copy had to be made so that DeCandolle would not have to part with it.

== Early years of independence ==
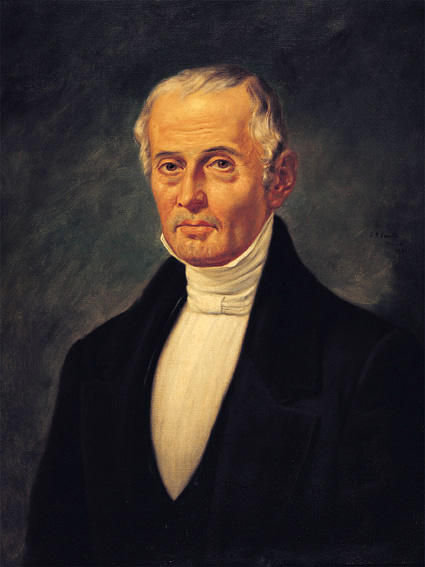
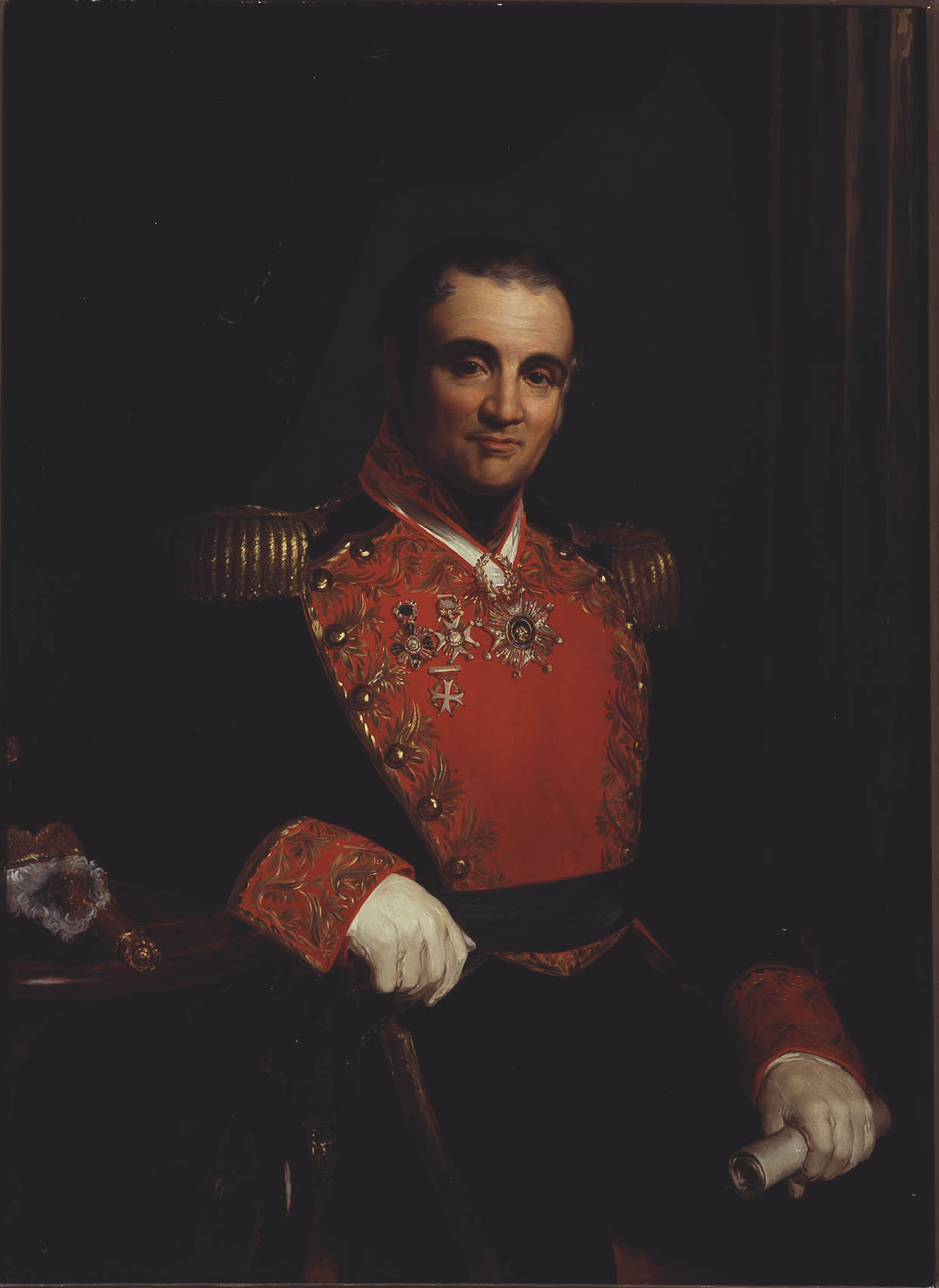
Two of Mexico's most notable presidents in the decades after independence: Valentín Gómez Farías (left) and Anastasio Bustamante (right) had previously been physicians.

In 1833, President Valentín Gómez Farías, himself a physician decreed the establishment of a School of Medical Sciences. It was ultimately not built due to the Gomez Farias administration being overthrown by a coup shortly afterward, but in 1854 a private medical college was established in Mexico City. Gómez Farías also closed the Royal and Pontifical University of Mexico in 1833 as part of his anti-clerical measures.

Certain Mexican presidents in this era had come from a background in the sciences. President Anastasio Bustamante had been a physician and during a temporary exile in Europe, he had spent some of his time visiting the anatomical collections of Montpellier and Vienna. President Valentín Gómez Farías had started out his professional career practicing medicine in Guadalajara. President Manuel Robles Pezuela was a military engineer who had engaged in important geodesic and topographic projects in the Isthmus of Tehuantepec. He was also a member of the Mexican Society of Statistics and of the Paris Geographical Society.

The statesman Lucas Alamán who served under multiple administrations had come from a background of mining engineering, and in his youth he had studied in Europe under René Just Haüy, Jean-Baptiste Biot, and Louis Jacques Thénard. He had also sought to bring to Mexico the technique of separating silver and gold through the use of sulfuric acid in contrast to the old technique of using nitric acid.

General Pedro García Conde studied mathematics, chemistry, and mineralogy, at the Mining College in Mexico, and joined the military as an engineer. In 1834, he was named geometer of the boundary commission. In 1838 he was named director of the Military College.

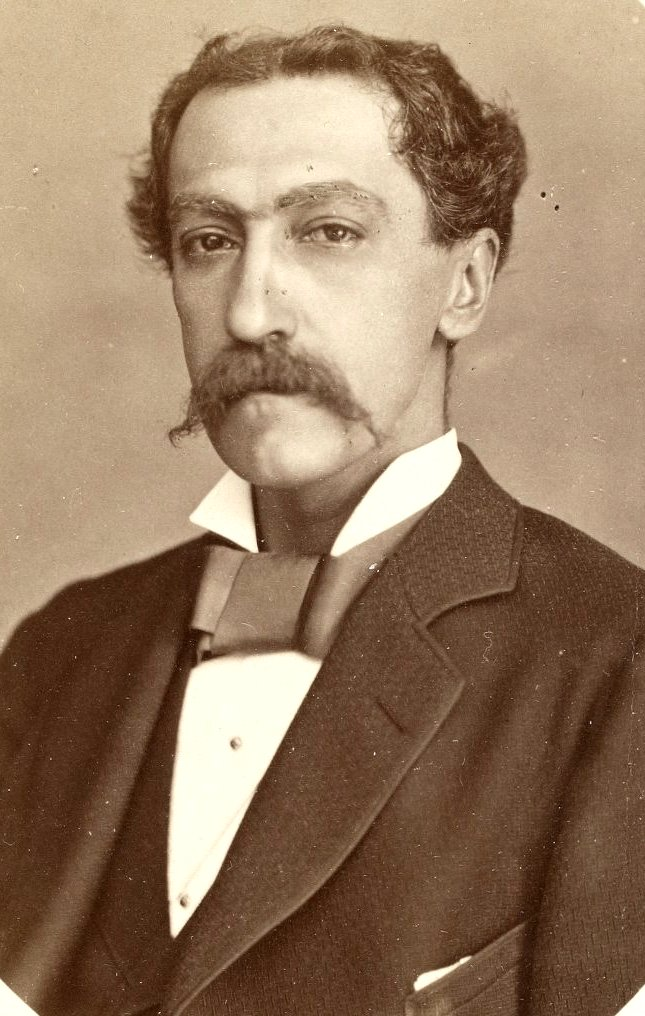
Francisco Díaz Covarrubias: engineer, astronomer, geographer, professor and founder of an astronomical observatory in Mexico City

Conde passed sweeping reforms for the military college, establishing courses on descriptive geometry, applied mechanics, astronomy and geodesy. He was Secretary of War in the years leading up to the Mexican American War. He was tasked by a government commission to map the boundary established by the Treaty of Guadalupe Hidalgo, and made the effort to try to save as much territory as he could for Mexico.

Francisco Díaz Covarrubias studied at the Mining School, and in 1854 he was appointed professor of topography, geodesy, and astronomy. He was part of the team that made the first detailed hydrographic map of the valley of Mexico, and improved upon the Mexican geographic coordinates made by Alexander von Humboldt.

Leopoldo Río de la Loza studied at San Ildefonso College and in 1827 received the title of surgeon. He did not enjoy the field and began studying to work as a pharmacist. He graduated in 1833 and played a role in the efforts against the cholera epidemic which broke out that year. He published articles on mineral and drinking waters, on medication, on Lake Texcoco, and other matters related to public hygiene.

Miguel F. Jiménez after attending medical school began teaching anatomy in 1838. He published an landmark study on spotted fever colloquially known as tabardillo, in 1846. He continued to publish various treatises on illnesses and conditions throughout his career.

The first industrial exhibition in Mexico opened on November 1, 1849, in Mexico City. In 1849, the exclusive concession to establish telegraph lines was granted to Juan de la Granja, and in December 1851 the first telegram in Mexico was transmitted from Mexico City to Puebla. The line was extended to Vera Cruz the following year.

During the period of the Second Mexican Empire, Emperor Maximilian organized an academy of science and literature. Among its scientific faculty were Leopoldo Río de la Loza, Miguel F. Jiménez, head of the school of medicine, Joaquin de Mier y Teran professor of mathematics at the College of Mining, and the mining engineer Antonio del Castillo.

Maximilian's Minister of Public Works Luis Robles Pezuela presented the government a report on the state of Mexico's telegraphic network which then included three lines. One connecting Veracruz to Tehuacán, and two private lines: one of them connecting Bagdad to Matamoros. Maximilian also had a private line built, connecting the Chapultepec Castle to the National Palace. The Emperor made efforts to expand this network.

A railroad connecting Veracruz to Mexico City was first proposed in 1830. The government granted an ill-fated concession to begin the project in 1837. After more ill-fated efforts substantial progress was finally made in 1857 after a concession had been granted to Antonio Escandon, but it was interrupted by the nation's ongoing civil wars. Engineers commissioned by Emperor Maximilian completed 134 miles before the fall of the Second Mexican Empire in 1867. The long-awaited Mexico City to Veracruz railroad line was finally inaugurated on January 1, 1873.

== Porfiriato ==
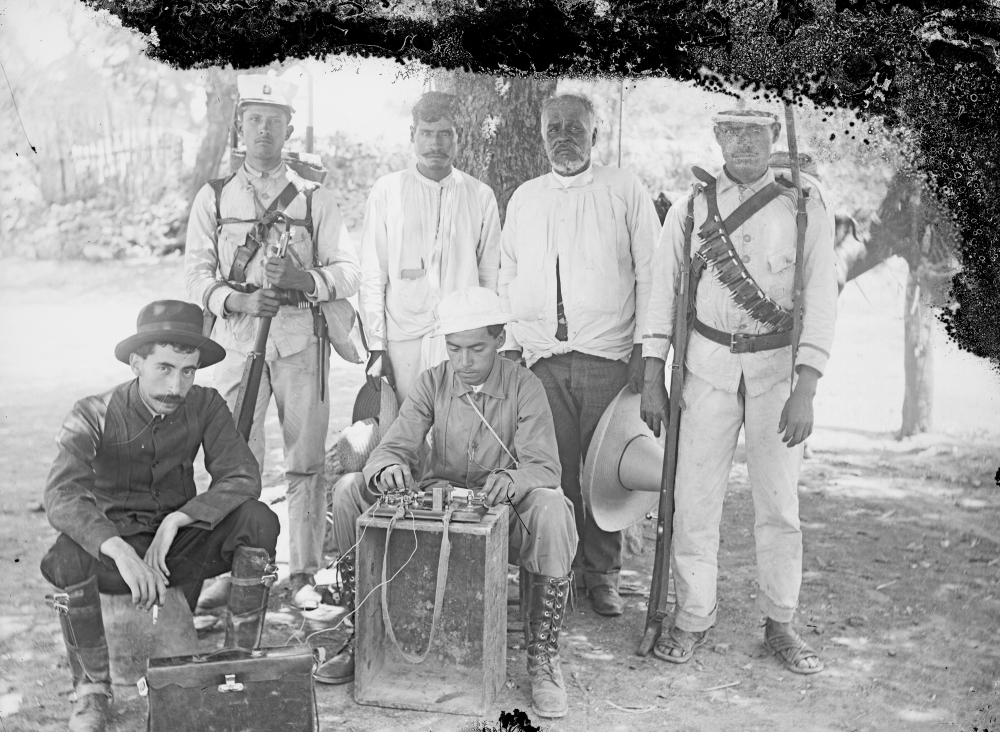
Mexican troops with a telegraph machine during the Mexican Revolution

Porfirio Díaz' ascension to the presidency in 1876 brought an end to the Mexican civil wars which had repeatedly broken out since independence had first been achieved. Mexico entered upon a period of stability and industrialization which also contributed to advances in science and technology. The influence of French Positivism led to a renaissance of scientific activity in Mexico.

Chief among the positivists was Gabino Barreda who founded the Escuela Nacional Preparatoria and became its first director. The medical faculty would eventually include the physicians Manuel Carmona y Valle, Eduardo Liceaga, and Rafael Lavista y Rebolla, the oculist Joaquín Vértiz, and the pediatrician Miguel Otero y Arce. The faculty of physical scientists would eventually include the chemist Andrés Almaraz, and the engineer Mariano de la Bárcena. The faculty of mathematics would eventually include Jose Joaquin Terrazas, and the engineer Leandro Fernández Imas.

A national observatory at Chapultepec was decreed in December 1876 and inaugurated on May 1878. Its first director was Francisco Díaz Covarrubias. The observatory included a meteorological and magnetic observatory and maintained correspondence with international observatories and scientific organizations. In 1877 a meteorological observatory was established which also maintained correspondence with international observatories. Covarrubias was appointed president over a scientific commission tasked with travelling to Japan to observe the 1874 transit of Venus. A geological society was established in 1875.

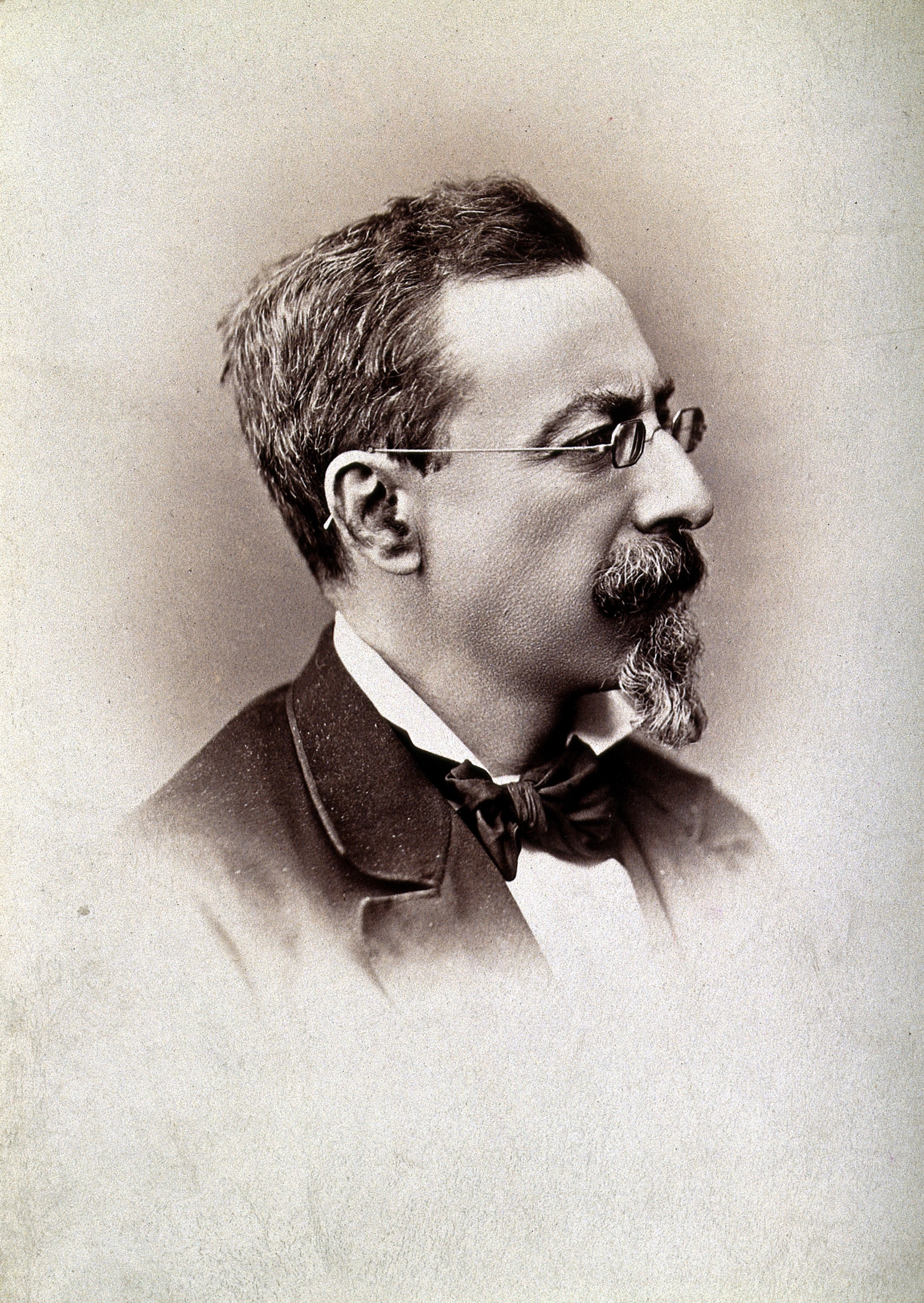
Alfonso L. Herrera, a biologist who made important contributions to the study of Mexican flora and fauna

The Federal Telegraphic Office during this time provided meteorological observations. The Academy of Medicine annually awarded prizes to the authors of the best scientific reports. A Pedro Escobedo Society also awarded prizes for scientific accomplishments. The Mexican government made efforts to reward scientific discovery by sending relevant scientists to Europe so that they could gain more attention for their work.

The proliferation of railroads stimulated the development of Mexican industry by giving it access to the latest machinery.

A Ministry of Communications and Public Works was established during this time, and began a program of building lighthouses for Mexican ports. The Ministry also commissioned improvements to the Veracruz Harbor. Smaller improvements were made to the Atlantic ports of Progreso, Campeche, and Tuxpam. The only Pacific ports to be improved during this time were Manzanillo and Salina Cruz.

Improvements to the nation's telegraph network continued during this time. A school of telegraphy was established along with workshops to repair the network. Experiments were made in wireless telegraphy in order to bridge the Sea of Cortés. By 1902, the network spanned over 40,000 kilometers of wire with 379 stations.

A telephone network began to be built in Mexico during this time. By the beginning of the 20th century telephone networks between cities spanned over 27,000 kilometers of wire and included almost 3000 devices. Every state in Mexico was included in the network.

General Manuel Mondragón invented the Mondragón rifle during this time. These designs include the straight-pull bolt-action M1893 and M1894 rifles, and Mexico's first self-loading rifle, the M1908—the first of the designs to see combat use.

== Science and technology in the 20th century ==
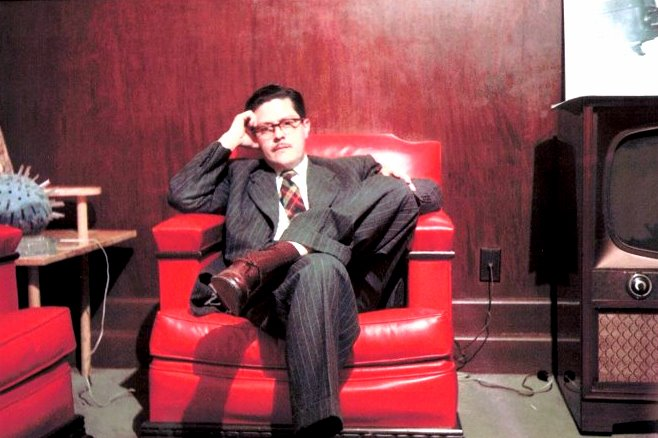
Guillermo González was a Mexican electrical engineer who was the inventor of a color-wheel type of color television, and who also introduced color television to Mexico.

During the 20th century, Mexico made significant progress in science and technology. New universities and research institutes were established. The National Autonomous University of Mexico (Universidad Nacional Autónoma de México, UNAM) was officially established in 1910, and the university become one of the most important institutes of higher learning in Mexico. UNAM provides education in science, medicine, and engineering. Many scientific institutes and new institutes of higher learning, such as National Polytechnic Institute (founded in 1936), were established during the first half of the 20th century. Most of the new research institutes were created within UNAM. Twelve institutes were integrated into UNAM from 1929 to 1973.

Mexican scientists, physicians, and intellectuals were involved in the movement to shape Mexico's population through eugenics. The Sociedad Mexicana de Eugenesia was founded in 1931, and was concerned with mental disabilities, prison reform, tuberculosis, syphilis, alcoholism, sexual education, mestizaje, prostitution, puericulture, (scientific child-rearing), and single mothers. The society advocated for maternal assistance, eradication of juvenile delinquency, and incorporation of its ideas into the functioning of schools, prisons, and public health administration. It succeeding in having established a medical clinic, the Hereditary Health Counseling Center, for workers. The organization published the journal Eugenesia until 1954.

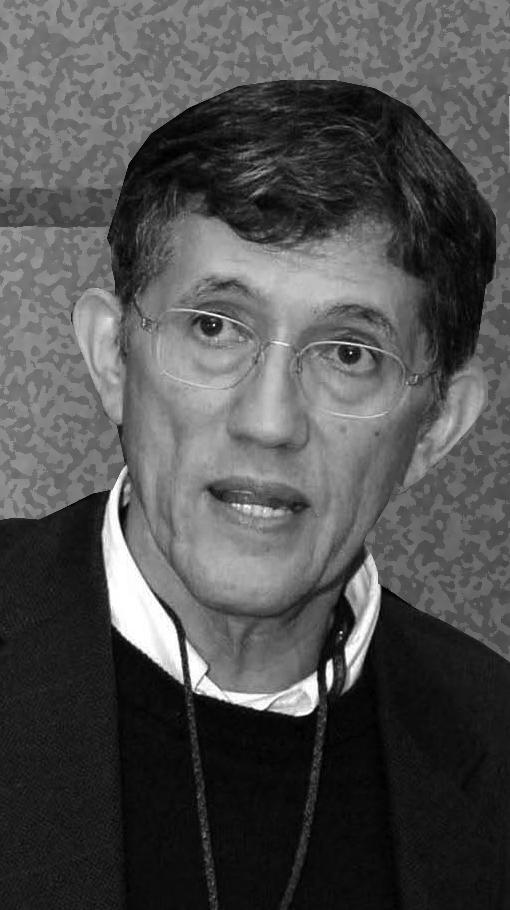
Antonio Lazcano served as president of the International Society for the Study of the Origin of Life.

In the 1930s Manuel Sandoval Vallartaa Mexican physicist worked on cosmic ray research and in 1943 to 1946, he divided his time between MIT and UNAM as a full-time professor. Alfonso L. Herrera's work laid the foundation for future research in Mexican biology and ecology. His studies on adaptation and desert ecosystems continue to be relevant and influential in the fields of biology and ecology to this day. Often regarded as one of the pioneers of Mexican biology and made valuable contributions to our understanding of the natural world. Known for his significant contributions to the fields of botany and zoology.

On August 31, 1946, Guillermo González Camarena sent his first color transmission from his lab in the offices of The Mexican League of Radio Experiments, at Lucerna St. #1, in Mexico City. The video signal was transmitted at a frequency of 115 MHz. and the audio in the 40-meter band. González Camarena was a Mexican engineer who was the inventor of a color-wheel type of color television, and who also introduced color television to Mexico.

Mexico was in the forefront of the Green Revolution, funded by the Rockefeller Foundation and developed by Norman Borlaug, who later won the Nobel Prize for his work. The aim was to increase the productivity of Mexican agriculture through the development of new strains of seeds. Mexico founded the International Maize and Wheat Improvement Center to further this scientific work.

In the 1950s, the wild yam known as barbasco was discovered to contain steroid hormones that could affect human fertility and led to the development of The Pill. A Mexican research company, Syntex was founded and began producing oral contraceptives. The Mexican government under President Luis Echeverría created a state-run company, Proquivemex, to control and regulate the industry.

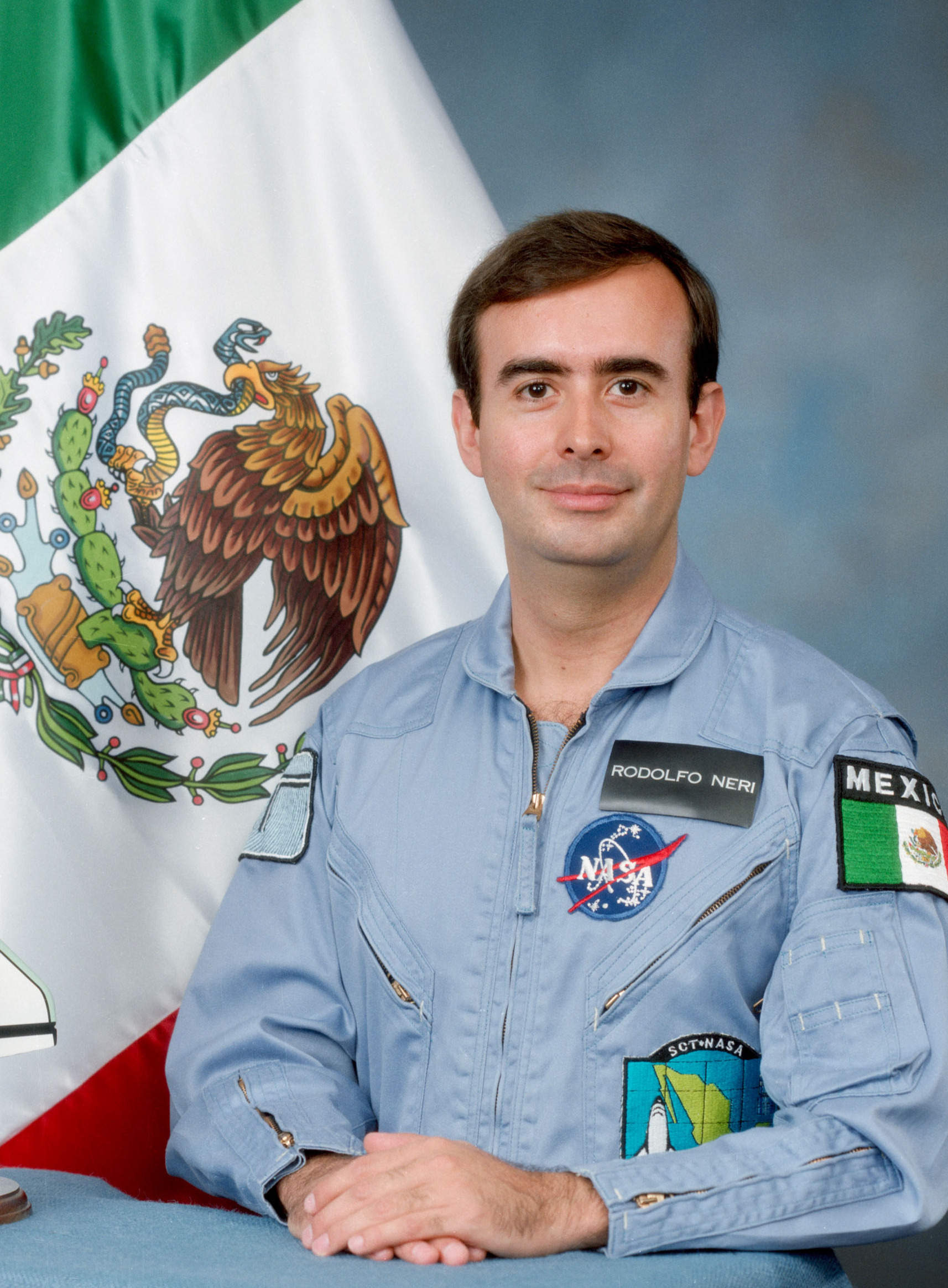
Rodolfo Neri Vela is the first and only Mexican, and the second Latin-American to have traveled to space.

In 1959, the Mexican Academy of Sciences (Academia Mexicana de Ciencias) was established as a non-governmental, non-profit organization of distinguished scientists. The academy has grown in membership and influence, and it represents a strong voice of scientists from different fields, mainly in science policy.

By 1960, science was institutionalized in Mexico. It was viewed as a legitimate endeavor by the Mexican society. Guillermo Haro through his own astronomical research and the formation of new institutions, Haro was influential in the development of modern observational astronomy in Mexico. Internationally, he is best known for his contribution to the discovery of Herbig–Haro objects.

In 1961, the Center for Research and Advanced Studies of the National Polytechnic Institute was established as a center for graduate studies in subjects such as biology, mathematics, and physics. In 1961, the institute began its graduate programs in physics and mathematics and schools of science were established in Mexican states of Puebla, San Luis Potosí, Monterrey, Veracruz, and Michoacán. The Academy for Scientific Research was established in 1968 and the National Council of Science and Technology (CONAHCYT) was established in 1971.

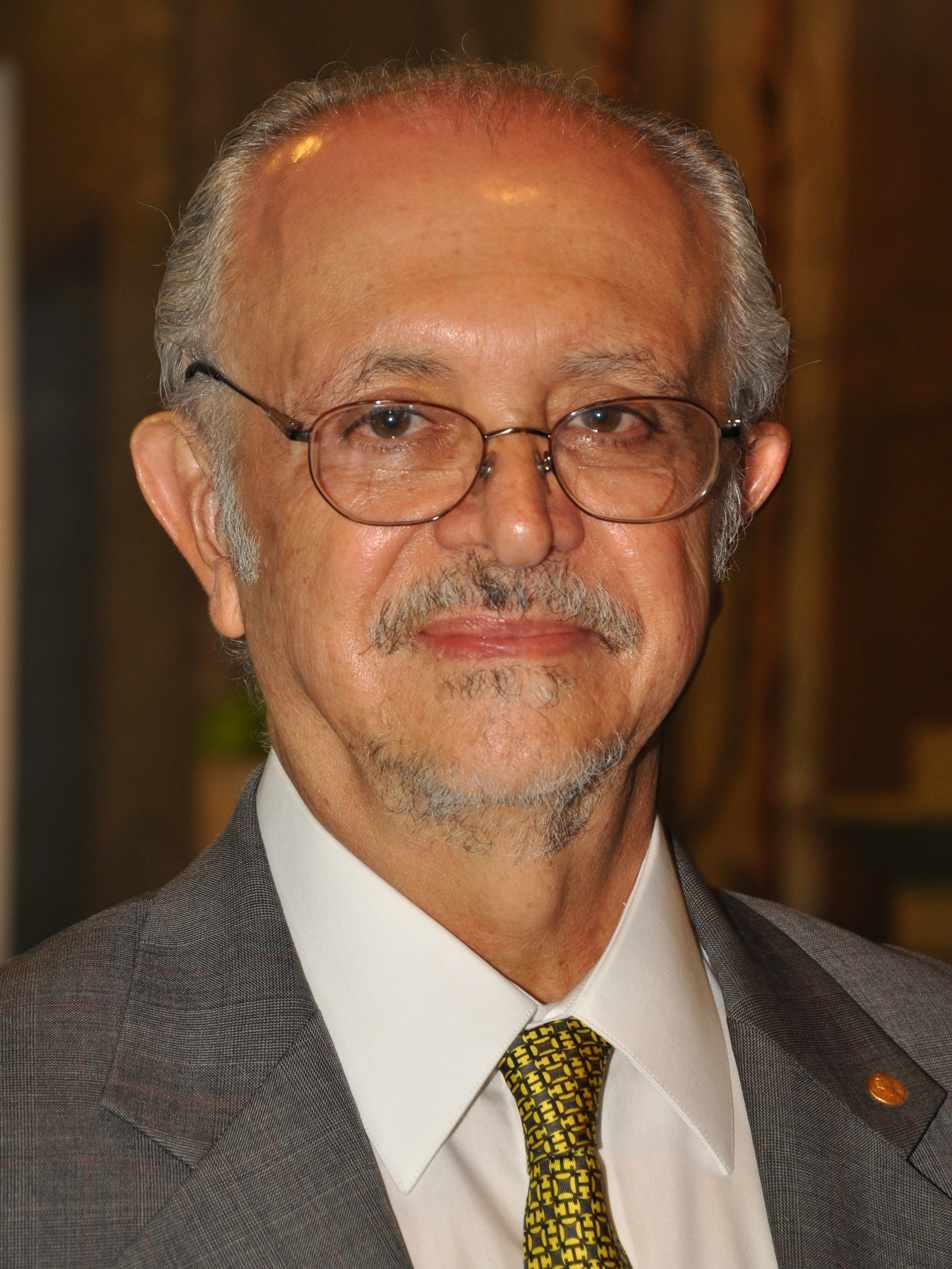
In 1995 Mario J. Molina became the first Mexican citizen to win the Nobel Prize in science.

Ricardo Miledi, one of the ten most quoted neuro-biologists of all time, was born in Mexico, D.F. in 1927. His career in science began in 1955 when, just before graduating in medicine at the Universidad Nacional Autónoma de Mexico (UNAM), he joined one of the most active research groups in his country, part of the Instituto Nacional de Cardiología (the National Institute of Cardiology).

Many of Professor Miledi's studies and breakthroughs in Neurobiology, especially those related to the mechanisms of synaptic and neuromuscular transmission, are considered to be classic throughout the world. Over 450 publications are the tangible product of forty years of research devoted to the main to the primary functions of the nervous system: the transmission of information between cells. He has been a member of the Royal Society of London since 1980 and entered the American Academy of Arts and Sciences in 1986. In 1999 Miledi was awarded the Prince of Asturias Award for Technical and Scientific Research. He has been Professor of Biophysics at the University of London and distinguished professor of the University of California since 1984. He also leads a neurobiology laboratory in UNAM in Querétaro, México.

In 1985 Rodolfo Neri Vela became the first Mexican citizen to enter space as part of the STS-61-B mission.

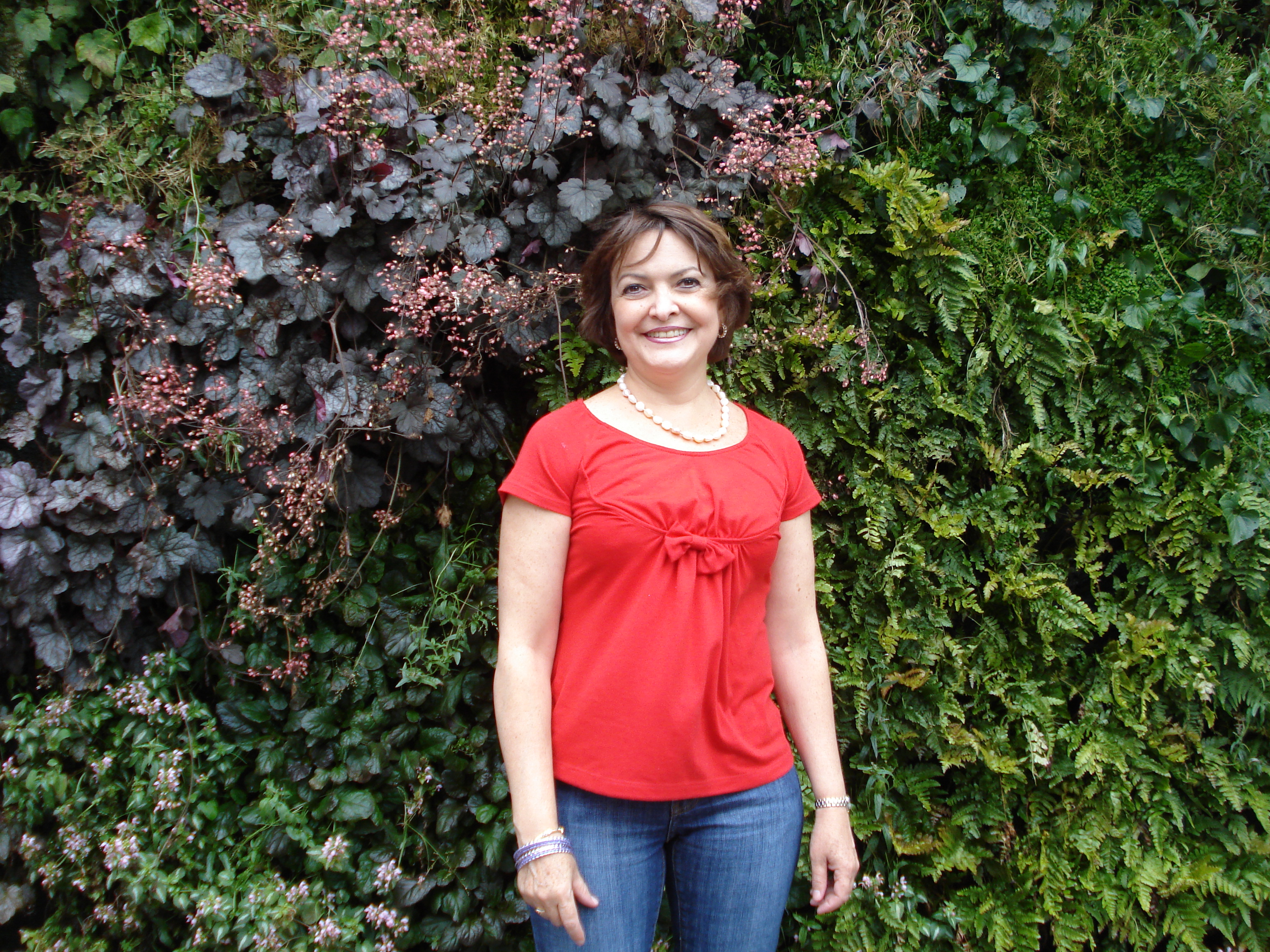
Tessy María López Goerne was nominated for the Nobel Prize in chemistry.

In 1995 Mexican chemist Mario J. Molina shared the Nobel Prize in Chemistry with Paul J. Crutzen, and F. Sherwood Rowland for their work in atmospheric chemistry, particularly concerning the formation and decomposition of ozone. Molina, an alumnus of UNAM, became the first Mexican citizen to win the Nobel Prize in science.

Evangelina Villegas work with maize led to the development of quality protein maize (QPM). Surinder Vasal, shared the 2000 World Food Prize for this achievement. Villegas was the first woman to ever receive the World Food Prize.

The Large Millimeter Telescope was inaugurated on November 22, 2006. It is the world's largest and most sensitive single-aperture telescope in its frequency range, built for observing radio waves in the wavelengths from approximately 0.85 to 4 mm. Located on top of the Sierra Negra. It is a binational Mexican (70%) - American (30%) joint project.

In 1962, the National Commission of Outer Space (Comisión Nacional del Espacio Exterior, CONNE) was established but was dismantled in 1977. On July 30, 2010, the law to create the Agencia Espacial Mexicana (AEM) was published. It is now in the process of defining the National Space Policy and its program of activities. Robotics is a new area under development in Mexico, the Mexone Robot is one of the most advanced robot designs in the world.

== Science and technology in the 21st century ==
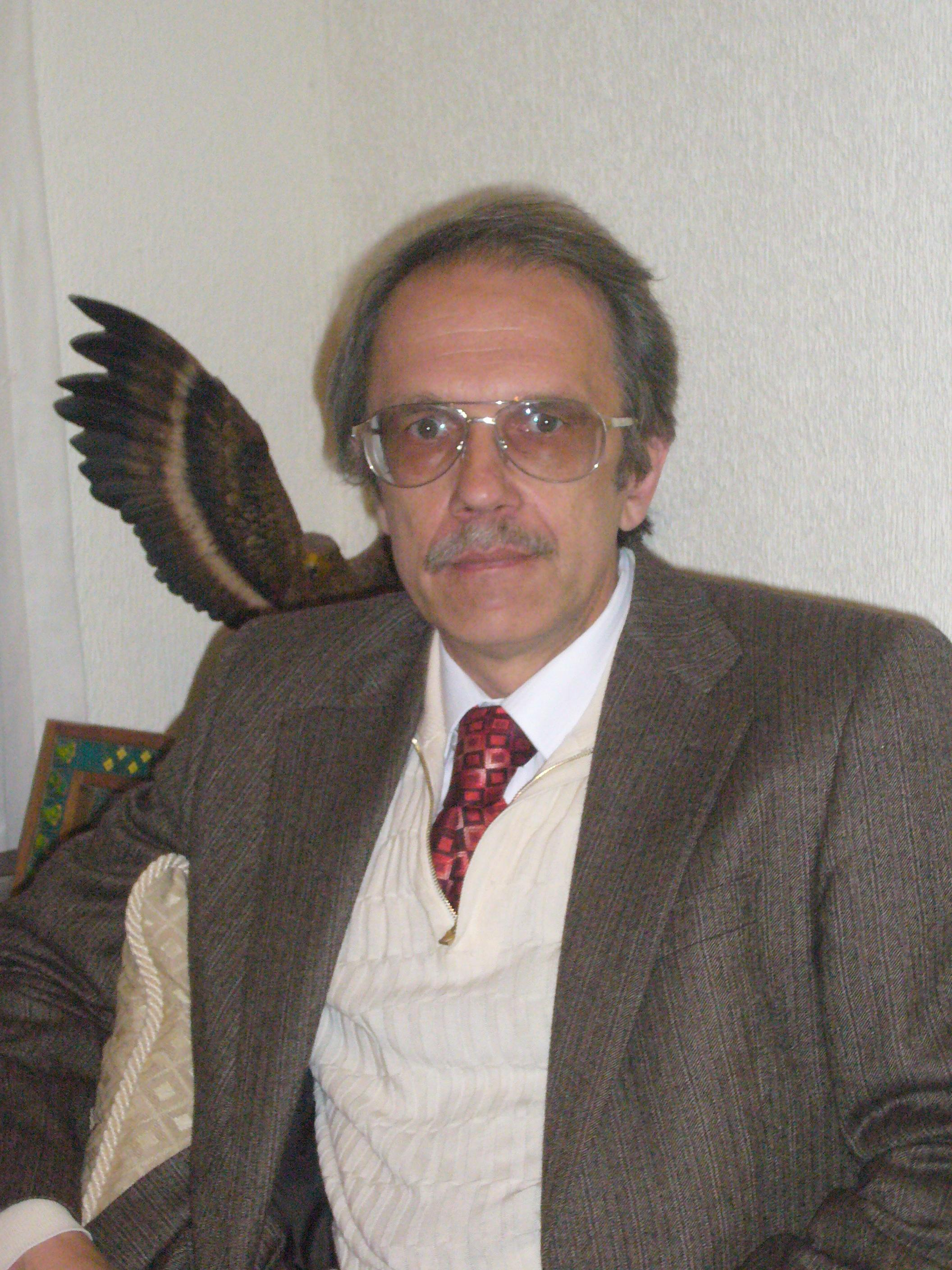
Alexander Balankin, a Mexican scientist of Russian origin professor of physics at the National Polytechnic Institute of Mexico, won the UNESCO Science Prize in 2005.

Austrade predicts Mexico's IT spending will grow at a compound annual growth rate of 11 percent over 2011–2015.

Based on the information managed by Scopus, a bibliographic database for science, the Spanish web portal SCImago places Mexico at 28th in-country scientific ranking with 82,792 publications, and 34th considering its value of 134 for the h-index. Both positions are computed for the period 1996–2007.

The electronics industry of Mexico has grown enormously within the last decade. In 2007 Mexico surpassed South Korea as the second-largest manufacturer of televisions, and in 2008 Mexico surpassed China, South Korea, and Taiwan to become the largest producer of smartphones in the world. There are almost half a million (451,000) students enrolled in electronics engineering programs.

José Hernández-Rebollar he invented an electronic glove, known as the AcceleGlove, which translates hand movements from the American Sign Language into spoken and written words. His invention already recognizes and translates 300 basic words. His invention has been recognized by the Smithsonian Institution, where he has lectured about the glove, which has attracted media attention.

Mission Colmena (hive) is to find a technology niche for Mexico in the space sector for the future. In which Mexico can participate together with an international consortia either in scientific exploration or in economic exploitation inner solar system bodies moons or asteroids and in particular objects that do not have their surfaces exposed to the interplanetary medium. The hives mission intends to use a complex systems of properties, the fact that each of the small robots will have the ability to autonomously navigate to get to join with as many units as possible and eventually connect electrically.

Mexico was ranked 58th in the Global Innovation Index in 2025.

=== Overview of science and technology policy, 2015–2019 ===
==== A shift in development model ====
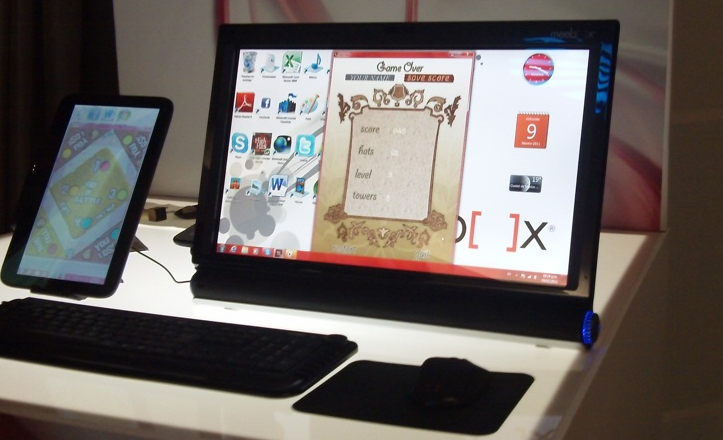
Desktop and tablet PC made in Guadalajara by local company Meebox

Since the change in government in December 2018, Mexico's socio-economic policy has pivoted towards a new development model with a focus on social programmes. The government has introduced new instruments to redistribute income. This has contributed to a change in the structure of public expenditure, both in terms of consumption and investment.

Mexico has been affected by the America First doctrine of its northern neighbour and main trading partner, which materialized in a long negotiation for the signing of the USMCA. As a result, Mexico has departed from its previous growth pattern of around 2% per year. In 2019, the economy shrank by 0.1%, although full employment was preserved, with just 3.4% of the population being unemployed at the time.

==== A focus on social and local challenges ====
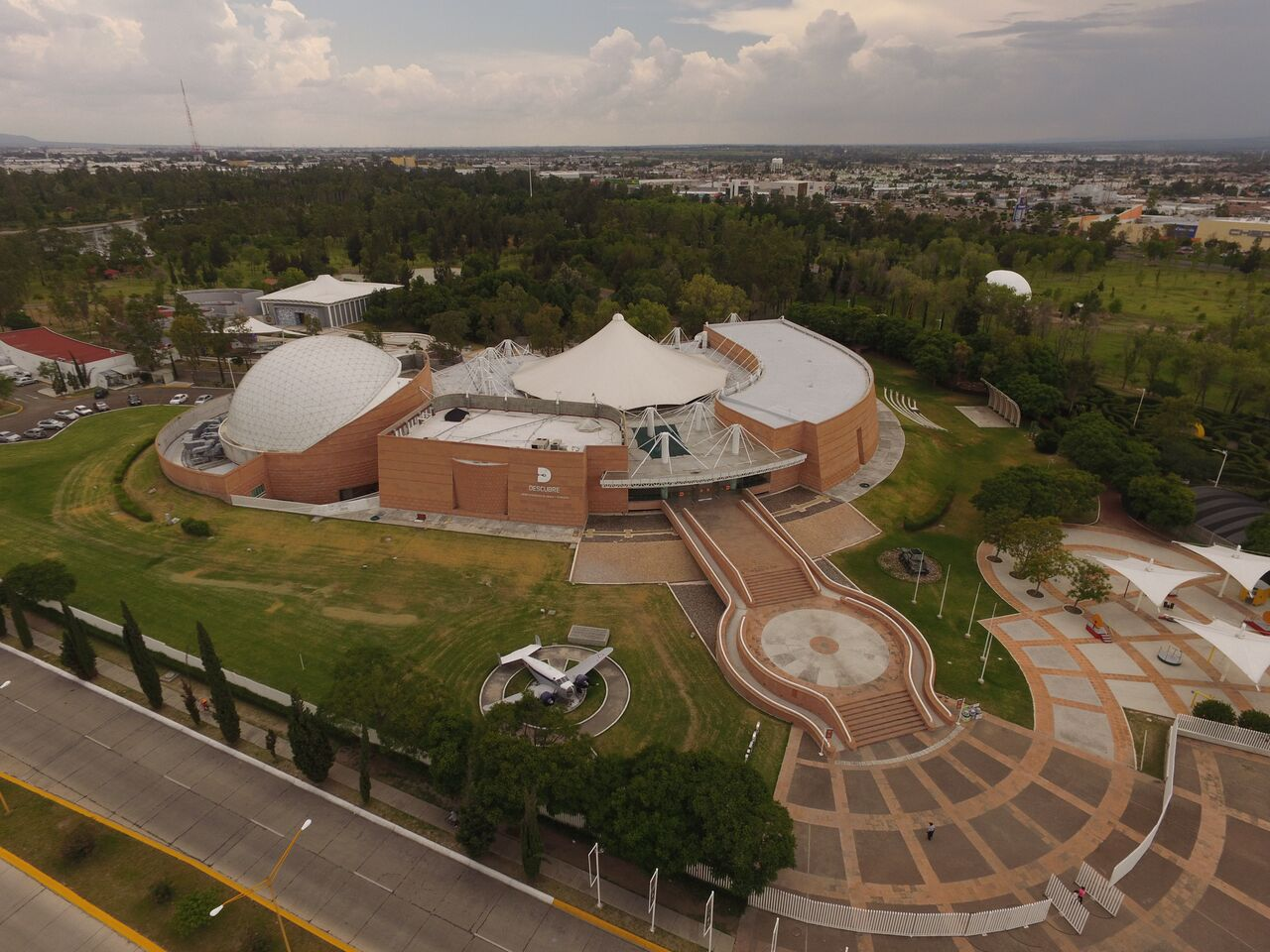
Discover Interactive Museum of Science and Technology

There is, as yet, little evidence that Mexico's economy will undergo deep structural changes overnight. The absence of any industrial policy suggests that the Mexican economy will remain dependent on oil and manufactured exports associated with global value chains, as well as remittances. Mexico's main targets, as outlined in the National Development Plan for 2019–2024, relate to national challenges such as poverty, inequality, employment and education. Mexico submitted a Voluntary National Review for the Highlevel Political Forum on Sustainable Development in 2018 and the current government has linked the National Development Plan to The 2030 Agenda for Sustainable Development. The government is working to connect science better with local challenges. Its new initiative, entitled Strategic National Programmes (PRONACES), allocates funding to research projects with a focus on societal issues at local level.

Programmes include: contaminating processes and the socioenvironmental impact of toxins; the promotion of literacy as a strategy for social inclusion; and the sustainability of socioecological systems.

PRONACES is co-ordinated by the National Council of Science and Technology (CONACYT). In 2019, PRONACES accounted for just 1.1% of CONACYT's budget but recent changes suggest that resources may be reassigned to this new programme. Since 2019, the government has reverted to a linear view of innovation that minimizes the vital role played by the business sector in innovation. One consequence of this policy shift has been that CONACYT no longer funds private business ventures, although it does still engage in other forms of public–private partnership like with the Querétaro Aerospace Cluster.

==== The end of the road for sectoral funds ====
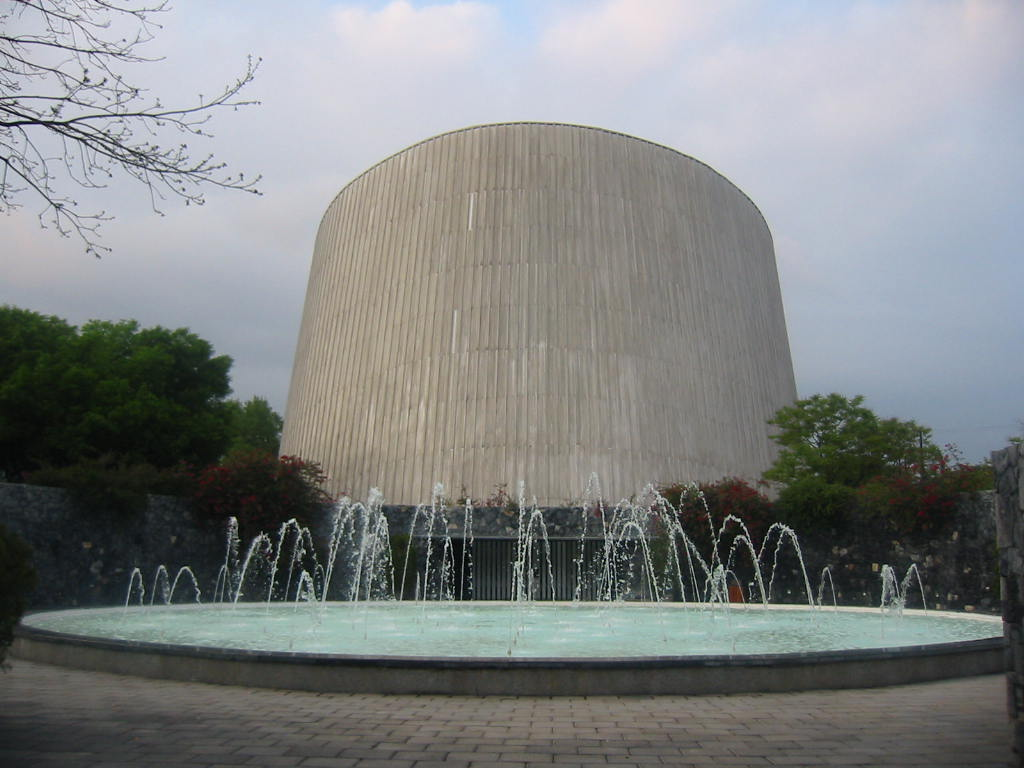
Alfa Planetarium was created by ALFA (Mexico) in 1978 to promote science and technology in Latin America.

Since 2019, the government has been gradually winding down the sectoral funds programme, as part of the curb on allocating resources to promote business innovation. In 2019 and 2020, CONACYT did not issue any calls for project proposals, meaning that only those projects having received funding in previous years remain operational.

The Law on Science and Technology (2002) stipulates that CONACYT is entitled to sign agreements with various ministries and other government bodies to cofinance each sectoral fund. Technical committees were set up to assign public resources to priority economic sectors. By 2005, there were 17 of these mission-oriented funds in sectors that included agriculture, energy, environment and health.

The amount of resources allocated to the sectoral funds has always been modest; by 2019, these amounted to 2.1% of CONACYT's budget.

In 2020, the government decided to eliminate sectoral funds altogether without undertaking any robust evaluation to justify their disappearance.

==== Putting the brakes on the slide in research intensity ====
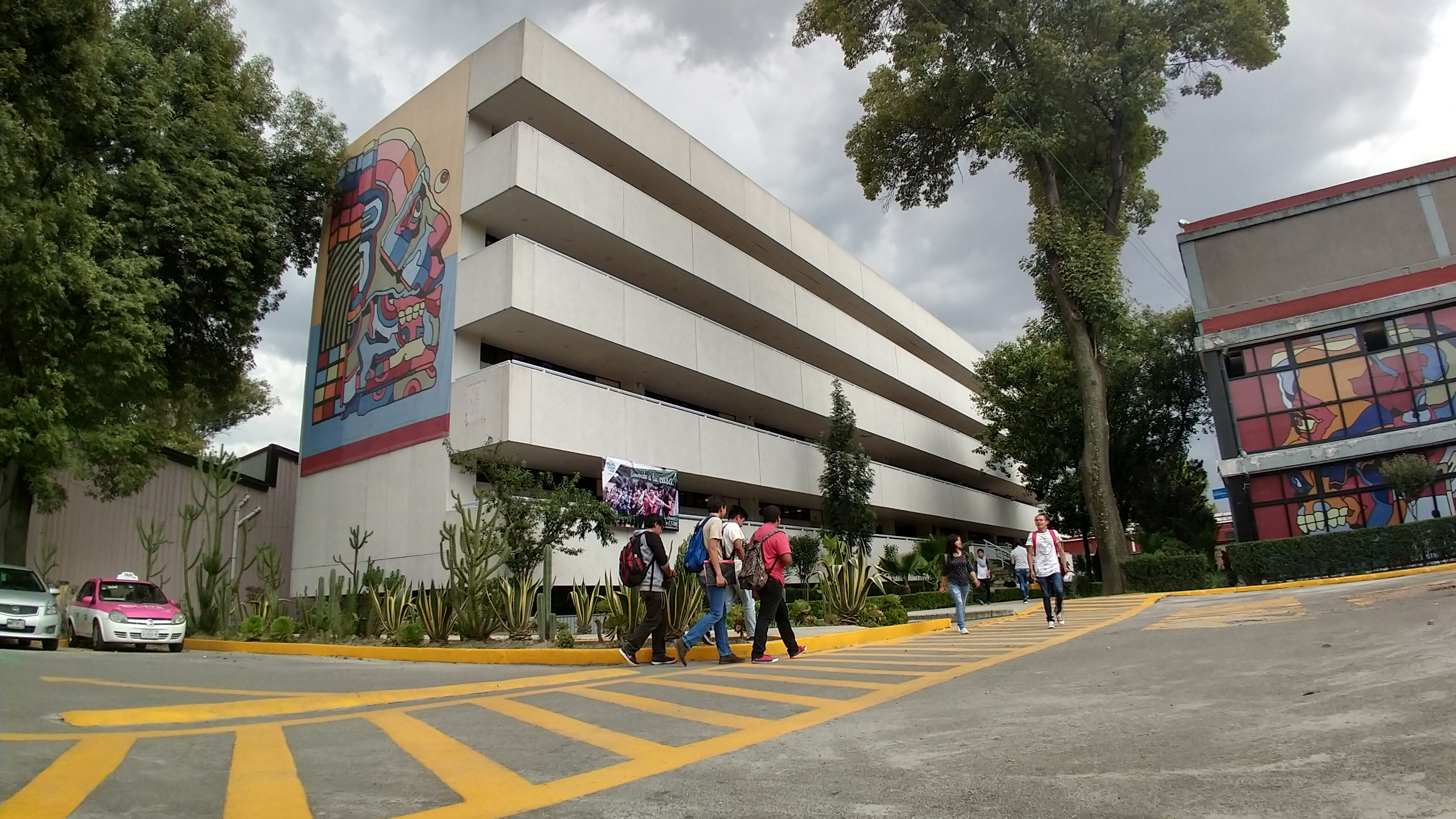
Superior School of Mechanical and Electrical Engineering (ESIME). ESIME is a division of the National Polytechnic Institute (IPN).

Research intensity has been declining steadily. In 2018, it hit a low of 0.31% of GDP. In 2020, parliament approved a rule prohibiting any further drop in public research expenditure until the 1% target laid out in the Law of Science and Technology is attained.

In 2018, the public sector financed nearly 80% of GERD. To promote basic science, the López Obrador administration has established a new programme called Frontier Science that is co-ordinated by CONACYT.

==== A far-reaching bill ====
A draft bill on science, technology and innovation was presented to the president in December. The bill proposes moving from a governance system in which the scientific, technical, academic and business communities at federal and state levels all participate in decision-making bodies towards a concentration of power in CONACYT. Some other normative documents already approved by parliament reflect this gradual centralization of decision-making power and resources in CONACYT. For instance, the new CONACYT Statutes approved in 2020 have eliminated the autonomous character of the body responsible for ensuring linkages between the public sector and the scientific, technical, academic and business communities, the Scientific and Technological Consultative Forum.

== Chicxulub crater ==
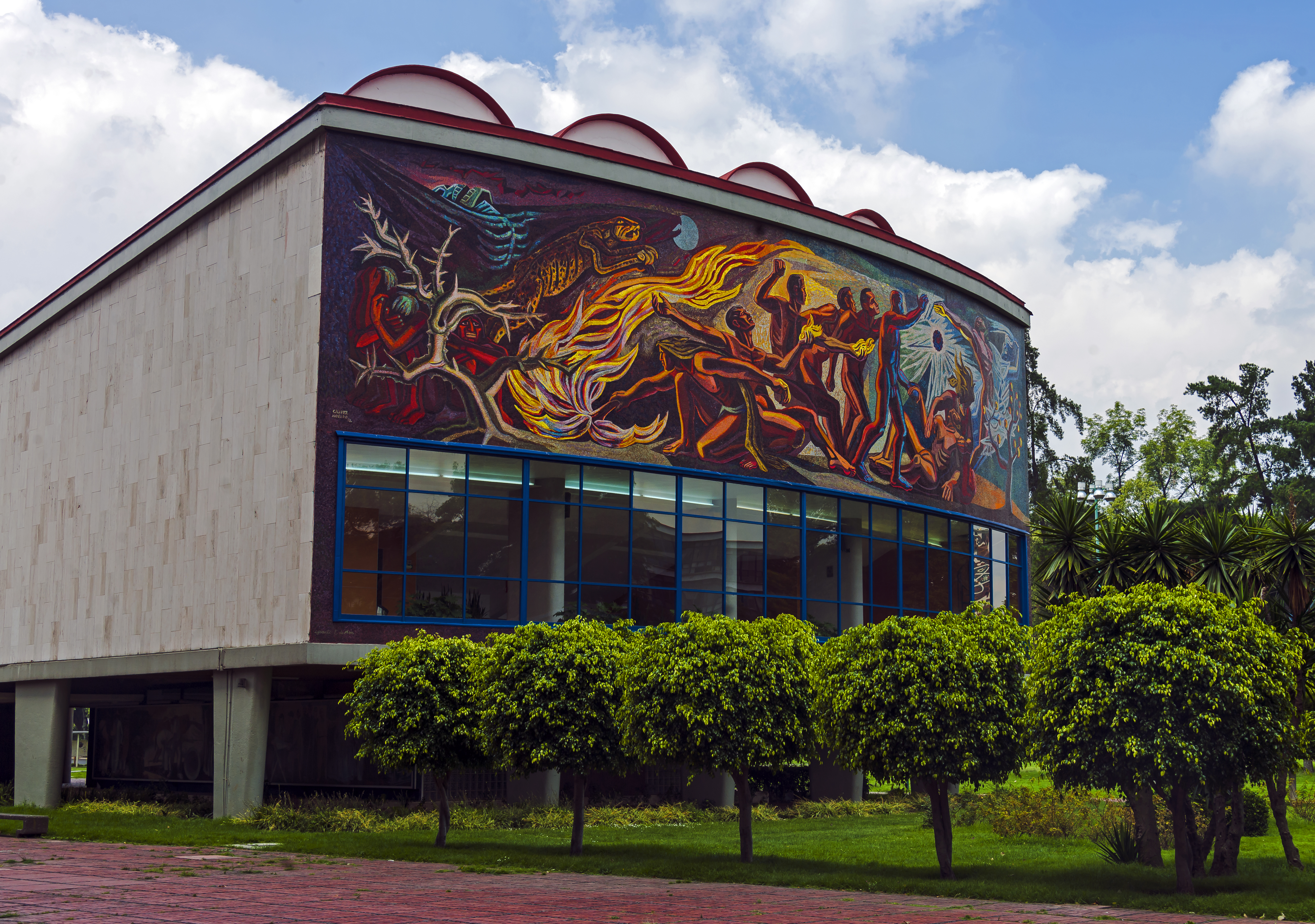
Eugenio Peschard: La Facultdad de Ciencia at UNAM (1953)

The Chicxulub crater is an impact crater buried underneath the Yucatán Peninsula in Mexico. The crater was discovered by Antonio Camargo and Glen Penfield, geophysicists who had been looking for petroleum in the Yucatán during the late 1970s. The Alvarez hypothesis posits that the mass extinction of the dinosaurs and many other living things during the Cretaceous–Paleogene extinction event was caused by the impact of a large asteroid on the Earth. Evidence indicates that the asteroid fell in the Yucatán Peninsula, at Chicxulub, Mexico. The hypothesis is named after the father-and-son team of scientists Luis and Walter Alvarez, who first suggested it in 1980.

== Mexican National Prize for Arts and Sciences ==
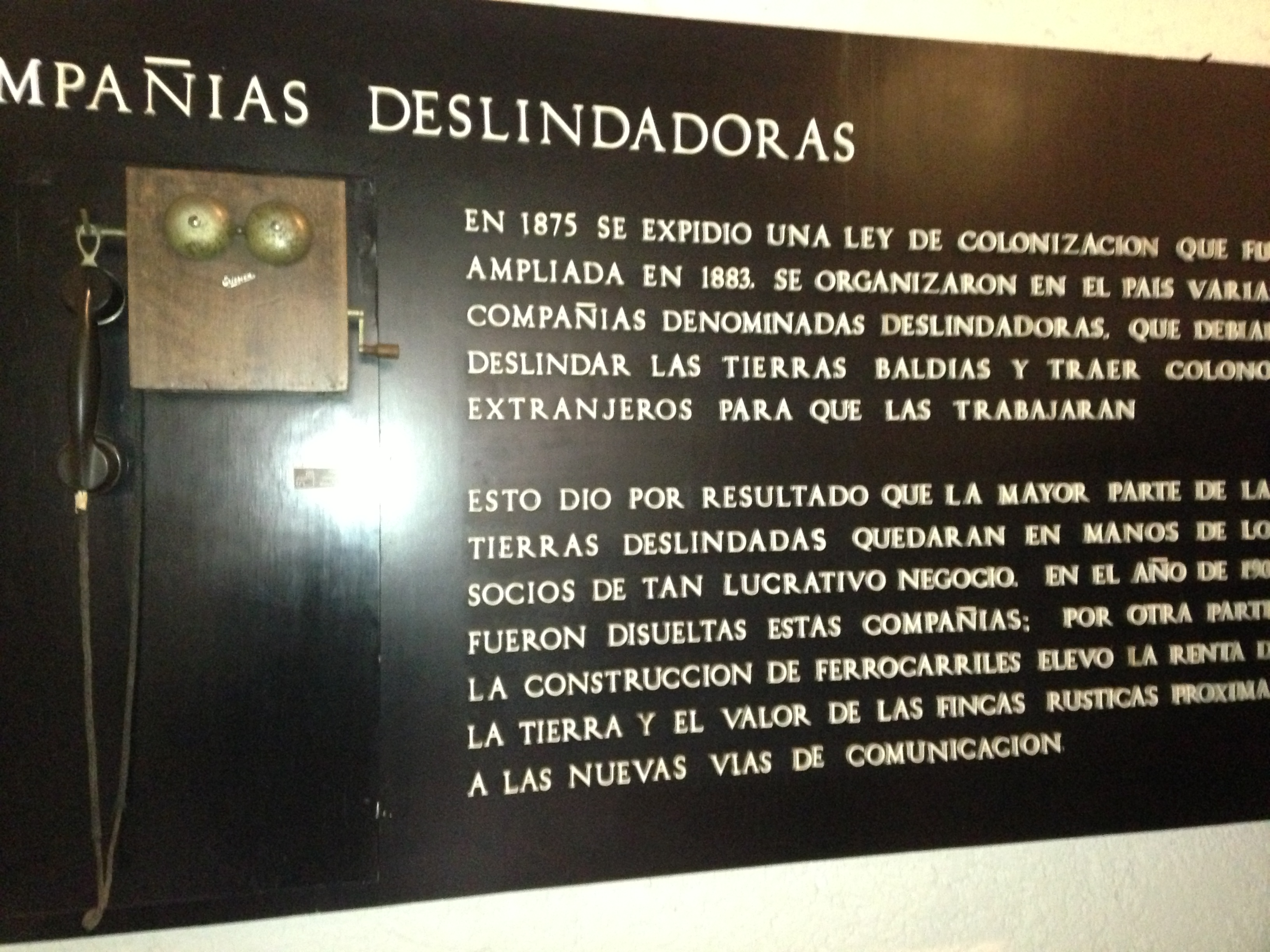
Ericsson phone in the Palace of Cortés, Cuernavaca, Morelos. Carlos Henry Bosdet was the first person to install and introduce the telephone in Mexico during President Porfirio Díaz's term in office.

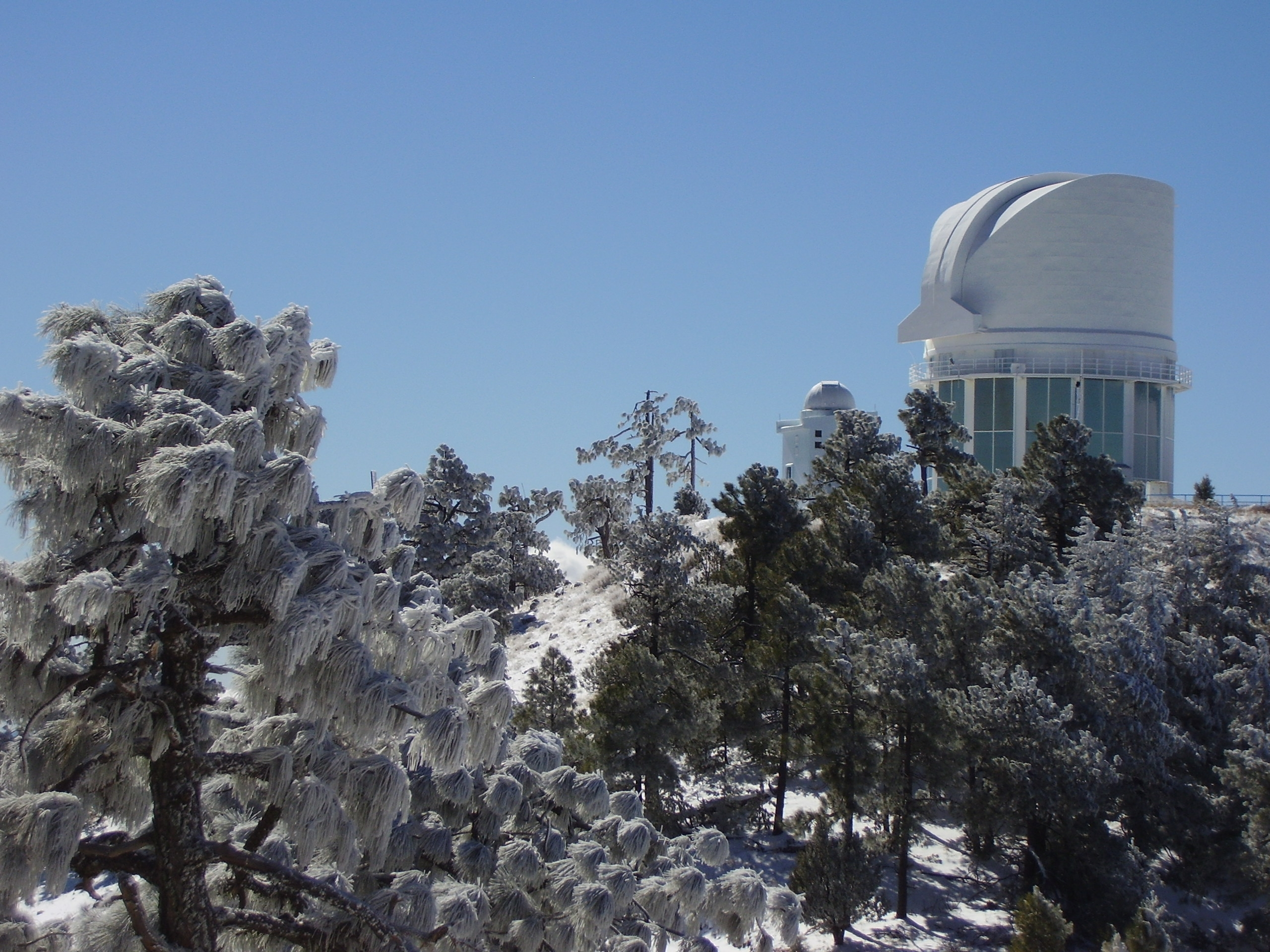
Guillermo Haro Observatory is named after Professor Guillermo Haro.

=== Physics, Mathematics, and Natural Sciences ===
Ciencias Físico-Matemáticas y Naturales

- 2018: (Tie)
  - Carlos Alberto Aguilar Salinas
  - Mónica Alicia Clapp Jiménez Labora
- 2017: María Elena Álvarez-Buylla Roces
- 2016: (Tie)
  - Cecilia Noguez
  - David Kershenobich Stalnikowitz
- 2015: (Tie)
  - Jorge Alcocer Varela
  - Fernando del Río Haza
- 2014: (Tie)
  - Carlos Federico Arias Ortiz
  - Mauricio Hernández Ávila
- 2013: (Tie)
  - Federico Bermúdez Rattoni
  - Magdaleno Medina Noyola
- 2012: (Tie)
  - Ruben Gerardo Barrera
  - Carlos Artemio Coello Coello
  - Susana Lizano
- 2011:Julio Collado-Vides
- 2010: (Tie)
  - Marcelo Lozada y Cassou
  - Gerardo Gamba Ayala
- 2009: (Tie)
  - Alberto Darszon Israel
  - Jaime Urrutia Fucugauchi
- 2008: (Tie)
  - Edmundo García Moya
  - Alberto Robledo Nieto
  - Moisés Selman
- 2007: Silvia Torres Castilleja
- 2006: Juan Ramón de la Fuente
- 1986: Adolfo Martínez Palomo
- 1985: Marcos Rojkind Matluk
- 1984: José Ruiz Herrera
- 1983: Octavio Augusto Novaro
- 1982: Bernardo Sepúlveda Gutiérrez
- 1981: Manuel Peimbert Sierra
- 1980: Guillermo Soberón Acevedo
- 1979: Pablo Rudomín Zevnovaty
- 1978: Rafael Méndez Martínez
- 1977: Jorge Cerbón Solórzano
- 1976: (Tie)
  - Ismael Herrera Revilla
  - Julían Adem Chahín
  - Samuel Gitler Hammer
- 1975:(Tie)
  - Arcadio Poveda Ricalde
  - Guillermo Massieu Helguera
  - Joaquín Gravioto Muñoz
- 1974: (Tie)
  - Emilio Rosenblueth Deutsch
  - Ruy Pérez Tamayo
- 1973: Carlos Casas Campillo
- 1972: (Tie)
  - Antonio González Ochoa
  - Isaac Costero Tudanca
  - Luis Sánchez Medal
- 1971: Jesús Romo Armería
- 1970: Carlos Graef Fernández
- 1969: (Tie)
  - Fernando de Alba Andrade
  - Ignacio Bernal
- 1968: Salvador Zubirán Anchondo
- 1967: José Adem Chaín
- 1966: Arturo Rosenblueth Stearns
- 1964: Ignacio González Guzmán
- 1963: Guillermo Haro Barraza
- 1961: Ignacio Chávez Sánchez
- 1959: Manuel Sandoval Vallarta
- 1957: Nabor Carrillo Flores
- 1948: Maximiliano Ruiz Castañeda

=== Technology and Design ===
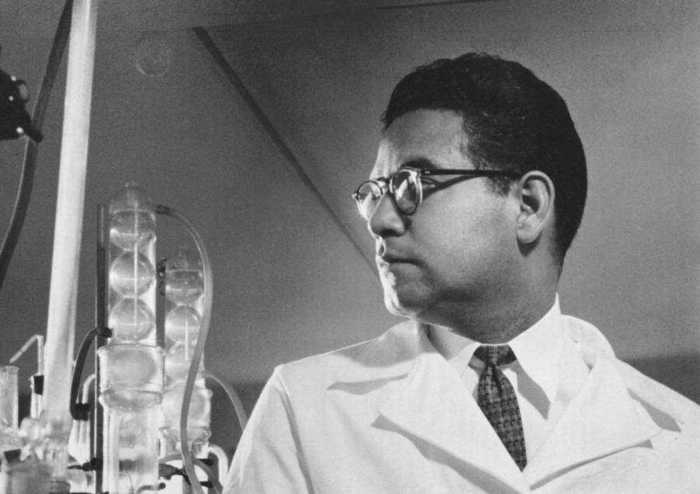
Luis E. Miramontes, co-inventor of the progestin norethisterone used in one of the first three oral contraceptives

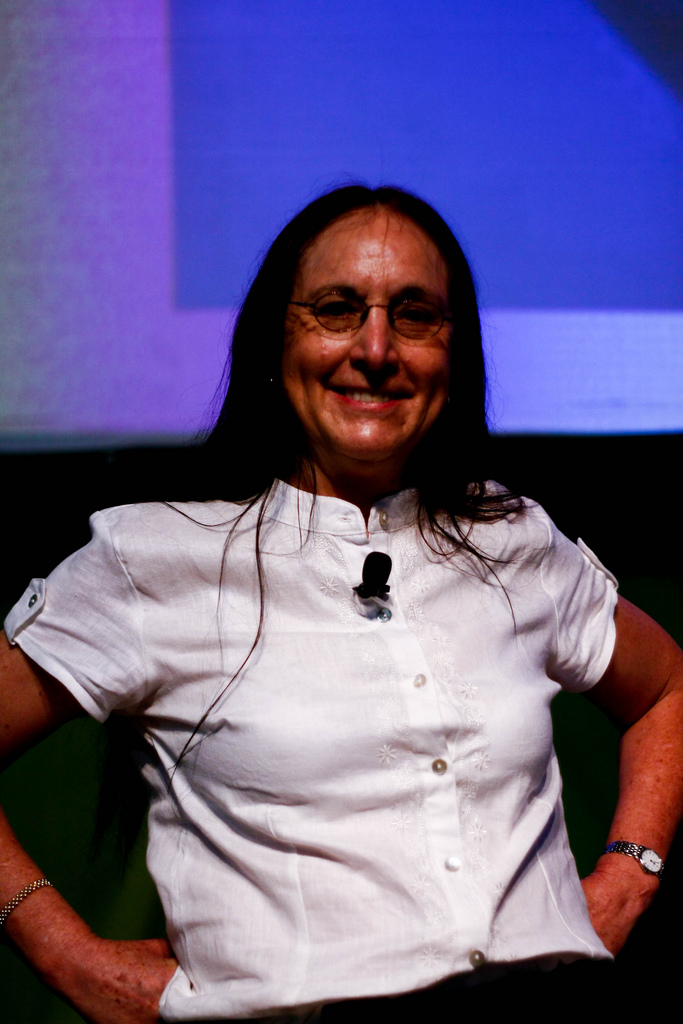
Julieta Norma Fierro Gossman, awarded the Kalinga Prize, UNESCO, 1995

Tecnología y Diseño

- 2018: (Tie)
  - Ricardo Chicurel Uziel
  - Leticia Myriam Torres Guerra
- 2017:Emilio Sacristan Rock
- 2016: (Tie)
  - Lourival Possani Postay
  - Luis Enrique Sucar Succar
- 2015:
  - Raúl Rojas
  - Enrique Galindo Fentanes
- 2014: José Mauricio López Romero
- 2013: Martín Ramón Aluja Schuneman Hofer
- 2012: Sergio Antonio Estrada Parra
- 2011: Raúl Gerardo Quintero Flores
- 2010: Sergio Revah Moiseev
- 2009: (Tie)
  - Blanca Elena Jiménez Cisneros
  - José Luis Leyva Montiel
- 2008: María de los Ángeles Valdés
- 2007: Miguel Pedro Romo Organista
- 2006: Fernando Samaniego Verduzco
- 2005: Alejandro Alagón Cano
- 2004: (Tie)
  - Héctor Mario Gómez Galvarriata
  - Martín Guillermo Hernández Luna
  - Arturo Menchaca
- 2003: Octavio Manero Brito
- 2002: Alexander Balankin
- 2001: Filberto Vázquez Dávila
- 2000: Francisco Alfonso Larque Saavedra
- 1999: Jesús Gonzales Hernández
- 1997: (Tie)
  - Baltasar Mena Iniesta
  - Feliciano Sánchez Sinencio
- 1996: (Tie)
  - Adolfo Guzmán Arenas
  - María Luisa Ortega Delgado
- 1995: Alfredo Sánchez Marroquín
- 1994: (Tie)
  - Francisco Sánchez Sesma
  - Juan Vázquez Lomberta
- 1993: José Ricardo Gómez Romero
- 1992: (Tie)
  - Lorenzo Martínez Gómez
  - Gabriel Torres Villaseñor
- 1991: (Tie)
  - Octavio Paredes López
  - Roberto Meli Piralla
- 1990: (Tie)
  - Daniel Reséndiz Núñez
  - Juan Milton Garduño
- 1988: Mayra de la Torre
- 1987: Enrique Hong Chong
- 1986: Daniel Malacara Hernández
- 1985: José Luis Sánchez Bribiesca
- 1984: Jorge Suárez Díaz
- 1983: José Antonio Ruiz de la Herrán Villagómez
- 1982: Raúl J. Marsal Córdoba
- 1981: Luis Esteva Maraboto
- 1980: Marcos Mazari Menzer
- 1979: Juan Celada Salmón
- 1978: Enrique del Moral
- 1977: Francisco Rafael del Valle Canseco
- 1976: (Tie)
  - Reinaldo Pérez Rayón
  - Wenceslao X. López Martín del Campo

== Mexican-born scientists working in the United States ==
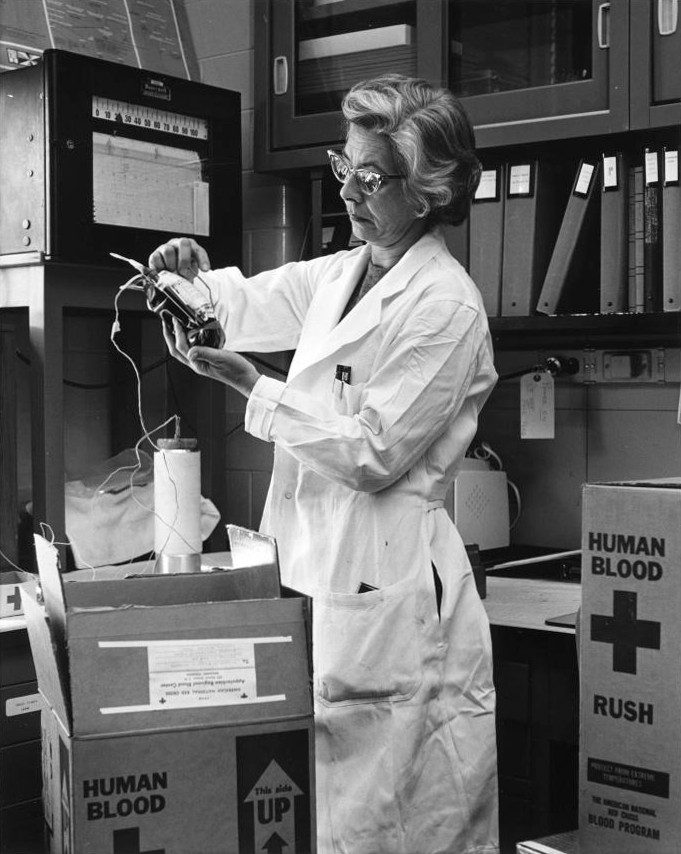
MD Sarah Stewart pioneered the field of viral oncology research, the first to show that cancer-causing viruses can spread from animal to animal. She and Bernice Eddy co-discovered the first polyoma virus, and Stewart–Eddy polyoma virus is named after them.

Héctor García-Molina a Mexican-American computer scientist and Professor in the Departments of Computer Science and Electrical Engineering at Stanford University was advisor to Sergey Brin, the co-founder of Google, from 1993 to 1997 when he was a computer science student at Stanford. In March 2015, Mexican-born engineer Luis Velasco, who works at NASA, designs and engineers robots for the company. He obtained a scholarship at Brigham Young University in Provo, Utah, and studied mechanical engineering. Details of a mousepad designed by Armando M. Fernandez were published in the Xerox Disclosure Journal in 1979.

In February 2015, SpaceX began developing a space suit for astronauts to wear within the Dragon 2 space capsule. Its appearance was jointly designed by Jose Fernandez—a Mexican Hollywood costume designer known for his works for superhero and science fiction films—and SpaceX founder and CEO Elon Musk. According to SpaceX, the spacesuit has key features such as a 3D printed Space suit helmet, touchscreen-compatible gloves, flame resistant outer layer, and hearing protection during ascent and reentry. Furthermore, each suit "can provide a pressurized environment for all crew members aboard Dragon in atypical situations. This suit also routes communications and cooling systems to the astronauts aboard Dragon during regular flight."

The Space For Humanity initiative selected Katya Echazarreta out of over 7,000 applicants to fly to space with Blue Origin NS-21 as a Space for Humanity Ambassador. Launched on June 4, 2022, she became the first Mexican-born woman in space.

- Alvarez - Gonzalez Rafael (molecular biologist)
- Albert Vinicio Bae (physicist, Science educator)
- Rodrigo Banuelos (mathematician)
- Barona, Andres, Jr. (educational psychologist)
- Diaz, Fernando G. (neurosurgeon)
- Garcia, Hector P. (physician, activist)
- Garcia - Luna - Aceves J.J. (electrical engineer, inventor)
- Arturo Gómez-Pompa (botanist)
- Gonzalez, Elma (cell biologist)

== Premio México de Ciencia y Tecnología ==
Premio México de Ciencia y Tecnología is an award bestowed in by the CONACYT to Ibero-American (Latin America plus the Iberian Peninsula) scholars in recognition of advances in science and/or technology.

== See also ==
- History of Mexico
- Spanish American Enlightenment
- Spanish language in science and technology
- CONACYT

== Sources ==
This article incorporates text from a free content work. Licensed under CC BY-SA 3.0 IGO Text taken from Latin America. In: UNESCO Science Report: the Race Against Time for Smarter Development, Gabriela Dutrénit, Carlos Aguirre-Bastos, Martín Puchet and Mónica Salazar, UNESCO. To learn how to add open license text to Wikipedia articles, please see this how-to page. For information on reusing text from Wikipedia, please see the terms of use.
