= Juchimán de Plata Award (Mexico) =

The Juchimán de Plata Award is a prize granted by Juchimanes de Plata, a Mexican civil association, to those personalities distinguished by their achievements in arts and literature, in science and technology, in communication sciences, and in human rights and peace. Four Juchimán de Plata Awards are granted on an annually basis, at a state, national and international level. The Juchimán de Plata Award includes a 15-cm height silver replica of the huge Olmec sculpture of the same name (which was found in 1884 in the municipality of Huimanguillo, state of Tabasco), set on a wood base and including a golden plate and the high-relief foundation's logo. The reasons why the award is granted in each case are described therein. The prize is granted by the civil association's Permanent Directive Committee.

== Prizewinners ==
As of this date, the following people have been awarded:

- Andrés Iduarte (1978)
- Juan Rulfo (1980)
- Alfonso Taracena Quevedo (1981)
- Luis Cardoza y Aragón (1982)
- Renato Leduc (1982)
- Román Piña Chán (1983)
- René Zavaleta Mercado (1984)
- Blas Galindo (1984)
- Leopoldo Zea Aguilar (1985)
- Augusto Monterroso (1985)
- Adolfo Gilly (1986)
- Jaime Sabines (1986)
- John Womack Jr (1987)
- Álvaro Mutis (1988)
- Jaime García Terrés(1988)
- Eduardo Nicol (1989)
- José Emilio Pacheco (1990)
- Andrés Henestrosa (1991)
- Elena Poniatowska (1993)
- Beatriz de la Fuente (1996)
- Héctor Fix Zamudio (1997)
- Miguel León-Portilla (1997)
- Marcos Moshinsky (1997)
- Beatriz Pagés Rebollar (1997)
- Federico Reyes Heroles (1998)
- Sergio García Ramírez (1998)
- Ikram Antaki (1999)
- Sergio Aguayo Quezada (2000)
- Juan Soriano (2000)
- Jean Meyer (2001)
- Armando Fuentes Aguirre "Catón" (2001)
- Sergio Pitol (2002)
- Néstor de Buen Lozano (2004)
- Roberto Fernández Retamar (2004)
- Ignacio Burgoa Orihuela (2004)
- Ruy Pérez Tamayo (2005)
- Óscar Arias Sánchez (2006)
- Bill Gates (2006)
- Sergio Sarmiento (2006)
- Guillermo Soberón Acevedo (2006)
- Juan Gelman (2007)
- Enrique González Pedrero (2008)
- Enrique Carbajal González (2008)
- Denise Dresser (2008)
- Alexander Balankin (2008)
