= Ixhuatán =

Ixhuatán may refer to:

- Santa María Ixhuatán, Santa Rosa department, Guatemala
- Ixhuatán, Chiapas, Mexico
- San Francisco Ixhuatán, Oaxaca, Mexico
