= José Hernández-Rebollar =

Mexican inventor (born 1969)

José Luis Hernández-Rebollar
- Born: August 25, 1969 (age 57); Puebla, Mexico
- Education: George Washington University, University of Puebla, INAOE.
- Engineering career
- Employer: Large Millimeter Telescope

Dr. Jose Luis Hernandez-Rebollar is a native of the Mexican state of Puebla. He invented an electronic glove, which translates hand movements from the American Sign Language into spoken and written words.

== Early life ==
Jose Luis Hernandez-Rebollar was born July 14 1969. He arrived in the United States in 1998, when he was granted a Fulbright scholarship to pursue graduate studies at the George Washington University in Washington DC, which granted him his PhD in 2003. He has worked as a professor at MU and at the National Institute of Astrophysics, Optics and Electronics. He is currently employed by INAOE as technical manager of the LMT

== Career and inventions ==
He received BSc and MSc from the University of Puebla. He invented an electronic glove, known as the AcceleGlove, which translates hand movements from the American Sign Language into spoken and written words. His invention already recognizes and translates 300 basic words. His invention has been recognized by the Smithsonian Institution, where he has lectured about the glove, which has attracted media attention.
