= Andrés Henestrosa =

Mexican politician (1906–2008)

Mexican Senator
- In office 1982–1988
- Constituency: Oaxaca

Personal details
- Born: November 25, 1906 Ixhuatán, Oaxaca
- Died: January 10, 2008 (aged 101)
- Party: PRI
- Occupation: Writer

Andrés Henestrosa Morales (November 25, 1906 – January 10, 2008) was a Mexican writer and politician. In addition to his prose and poetry, Henestrosa was elected to the federal legislature, serving three terms in the Chamber of Deputies, and as a senator for the state of Oaxaca from 1982 to 1988. He was born in Ixhuatán, Oaxaca.

== Youth and studies ==
Andrés Henestrosa started studying at Juchitán, Oaxaca. Until he was 15 he only could speak his native language, Zapotec. After finishing his basic education, Henestrosa moved to Mexico City and started studying at the National Teacher's School, where he learned Spanish excellently. Then, he studied at the National High School and after, at the Jurisprudence National School, where he started law studies but he did not graduate. At the same time, he studied at the Philosophy and Literature Faculty at the National Autonomous University of Mexico (UNAM). Around that time (1927) one of his teachers, Alfonso Caso, encouraged what would be the start of his career: he suggested Henestrosa write down Zapotec myths, legends and fables, which formed the basis of his first book, The Men Scattered by Dance, published in 1929. He befriended artist Frida Kahlo.

=== Academic work ===
Henestrosa contributed in many ways to Zapotec culture, keeping a line of investigation and exaltation of it; he also was one of the Mexican exponents of the literary movement called Indianismo, since his first book. He also wrote essays and political documents during his long career.

In 1936, Henestrosa was awarded the first of two fellowships he would receive from the Guggenheim Foundation to investigate Zapotec culture and linguistics. He worked on Zapotec language phonetization, its adaptation using the Latin alphabet, and a Zapotec–Spanish dictionary. During this trip, while in New Orleans in 1937, he wrote one of his most famous books: My Mother’s Portrait ("El retrato de mi madre").

He was a member of the Mexican Language Academy from October 23, 1964, to his death, as numerary member with chair 23. He was the treasurer of the Academy from 1965 to 2000. Andrés Henestrosa was one of the most prominent members of the Mexican intelligentsia.

=== 1949 Mexicana DC-3 crash ===
Henestrosa was supposed to be on a DC-3 that crashed on September 26, 1949, killing all 23 onboard. He had a premonition and instead boarded a train from Tapachula, the city he was traveling from, to Mexico City.

== Political career ==
In 1929, he supported (as did many UNAM students) the presidential campaign of José Vasconcelos, being an active part of the campaign acts and writing many essays and chronicles. But almost all of the original hand-written transcriptions were lost, being published in many magazines and newspapers.

In 1946, he joined the Institutional Revolutionary Party (PRI). In 1982 he was elected senator for his home state, Oaxaca, as a member of the PRI.

== Awards ==
- Belisario Domínguez Medal of Honor, 1993.
- National Prize for Arts and Sciences in the Linguistics and literature category, 1994.

Preceded by Ramón G. Bonfil	Belisario Domínguez Medal of Honor; 1993	Succeeded by Jaime Sabines Gutiérrez
