= Jaime Sabines =

Mexican poet and federal legislator (1926–1999)

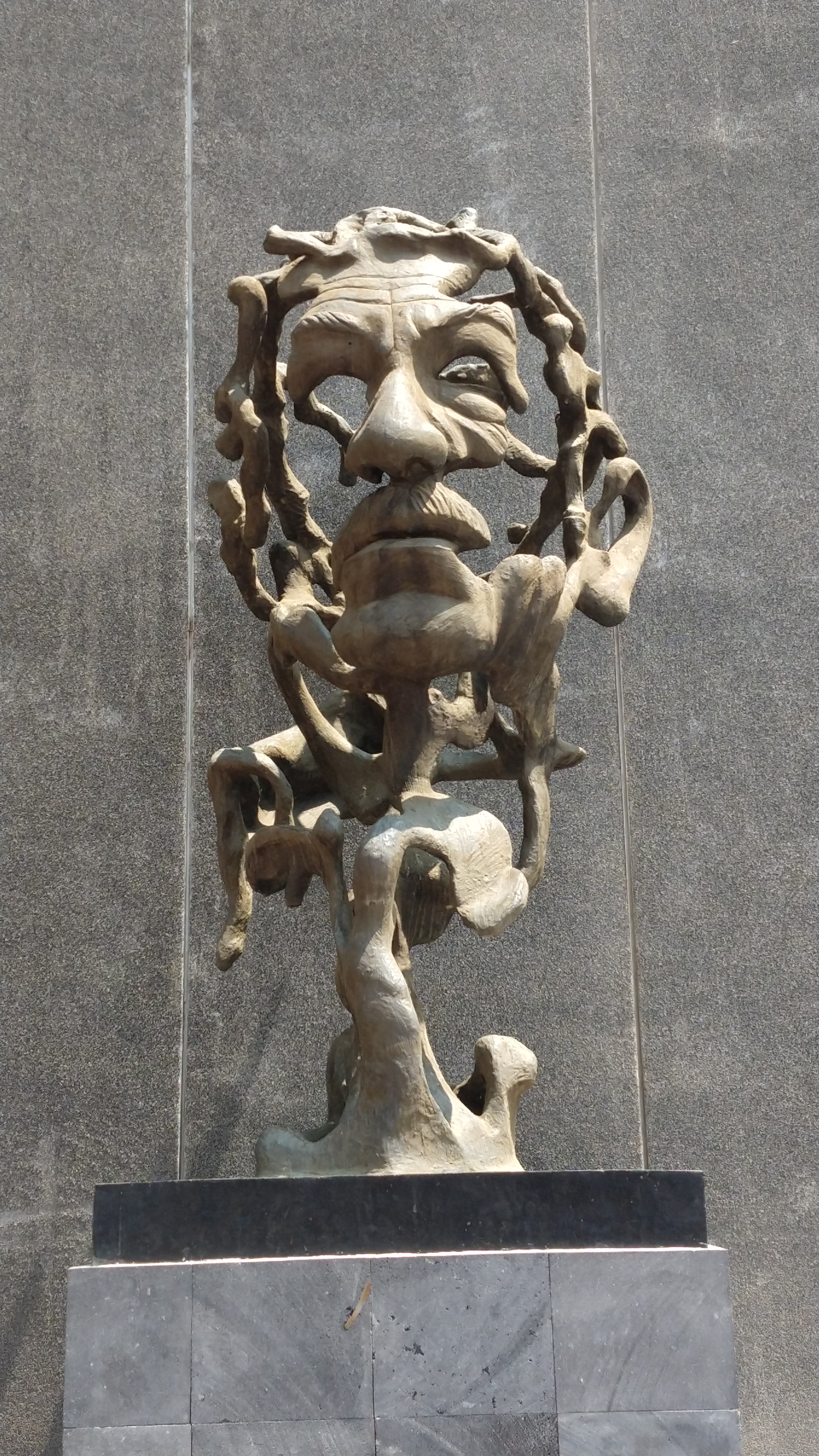
- Bust of the poet at the Centro Cultural Jaime Sabines in Tuxtla Gutiérrez.
- Born: Jaime Sabines Gutiérrez; March 25, 1926; Tuxtla Gutiérrez, Chiapas, Mexico
- Died: March 19, 1999 (aged 72); Mexico City, Mexico
- Education: UNAM
- Occupation: Poet
- Spouse: Josefa "Chepita" Rodríguez Zebadúa
- Writing career
- Language: Spanish
- Period: 1951–1994
- Notable awards: Xavier Villaurrutia Award; 1972 Lifetime achievements

Jaime Sabines Gutiérrez (Note: In this Mexican name, the surname is Sabines and the second or maternal family name is Gutiérrez.) (March 25, 1926 – March 19, 1999) was a Mexican contemporary poet. Known as "the sniper of literature" (Spanish: francotirador de las letras) as he formed part of a group that transformed literature into reality, he wrote ten volumes of poetry, and his work has been translated into more than twelve languages. His writings chronicle the experience of everyday people in places such as the street, hospital, and playground. Sabines was also a politician.

== Biography ==
Born in Tuxtla Gutiérrez, Chiapas, he was the son of Julio Sabines, a Lebanese immigrant, and Luz Gutiérrez, who was born in Chiapas. His father emigrated to the Americas as a child, along with his parents and his two brothers. The family settled in Cuba, but a few years later they moved to Mexico.

Before he devoted himself to the study of literature, he spent three years studying medicine before moving on to his real vocation:literature, studying at UNAM Universidad Nacional Autónoma de México. Sabines was an outstanding member of the Mexican Writers Centre from 1964 to 1965 and part of the jury for the Casa de las Americas prize. In addition to his literary activity, he participated in politics and became a federal deputy for the First District of Chiapas from 1976 to 1979, and for the Federal District in 1988. Sabines was awarded the Chiapas Award (1979), the Xavier Villaurrutia Award (1972), the Elias Sourasky Award (1982) and the National Literature Award (1983).

A collection of his work, Nuevo recuento de poemas, was issued by the publisher Joaquín Mortiz in 1977, and the Secretariat of Public Education in 1986. In 1994 he received from the Senate of Mexico the Belisario Domínguez Medal of Honor; in 1995, his selected poems, Pieces of Shadow (trans. W.S. Merwin), was brought out in a bilingual edition by Papeles Privados; and in 2004 Exile Editions (Toronto, Canada) published a bilingual volume of two early Sabines books, Adam and Eve & Weekly Diary and Poems in Prose (trans. Colin Carberry.) Octavio Paz considered him "one of the greatest contemporary poets of our [Spanish] language".

As a politician affiliated with the Institutional Revolutionary Party (PRI), he served two terms in the Chamber of Deputies. In the 1976 general election, he was elected for Chiapas's 1st district and, in the 1988 general election, he won a first-region plurinominal seat.

Sabines died in Mexico City on March 19, 1999, at the age of 72. President Ernesto Zedillo sent his condolences and offered a ceremony of homage at the Palacio de Bellas Artes; the family, however, declined the offer.

== Published poetry ==
- Horal (1950)
- La señal (1951)
- Adán y Eva (1952)
- Tarumba (1956)
- Diario semanario y poemas en prosa (1961)
- Poemas sueltos (1951–1961)
- Yuria (1967)
- Espero curarme de ti (1967)
- Tlatelolco (1968)
- Maltiempo (1972)
- Algo sobre la muerte del Mayor Sabines (1973)
- Otros poemas sueltos (1973–1994)
- Nuevo recuento de poemas (1977)
- No es que muera de amor (1981)
- Los amorosos: Cartas a Chepita (1983)
- La luna (1988)
- Love Poems Translated by Colin Carberry (2011, Biblioasis)

== Awards ==
- 1959 Chiapas, El Ateneo de Ciencias y Artes de Chiapas Prize.
- 1964 Scholarship granted by Centro Mexicano de Escritores (Mexican Center of Writers)
- 1973 Xavier Villaurrutia Award for Maltiempo.
- 1982 Elías Sourasky Award
- 1983 National Prize for Language and Literature.
- 1986 Juchimán de Plata Award
- 1991 Mexico City Medal
- 1994 Belisario Domínguez Medal of Honor
- 1996 Premio Mazatlán de Literatura, for Pieces of shadow

== Legacy ==
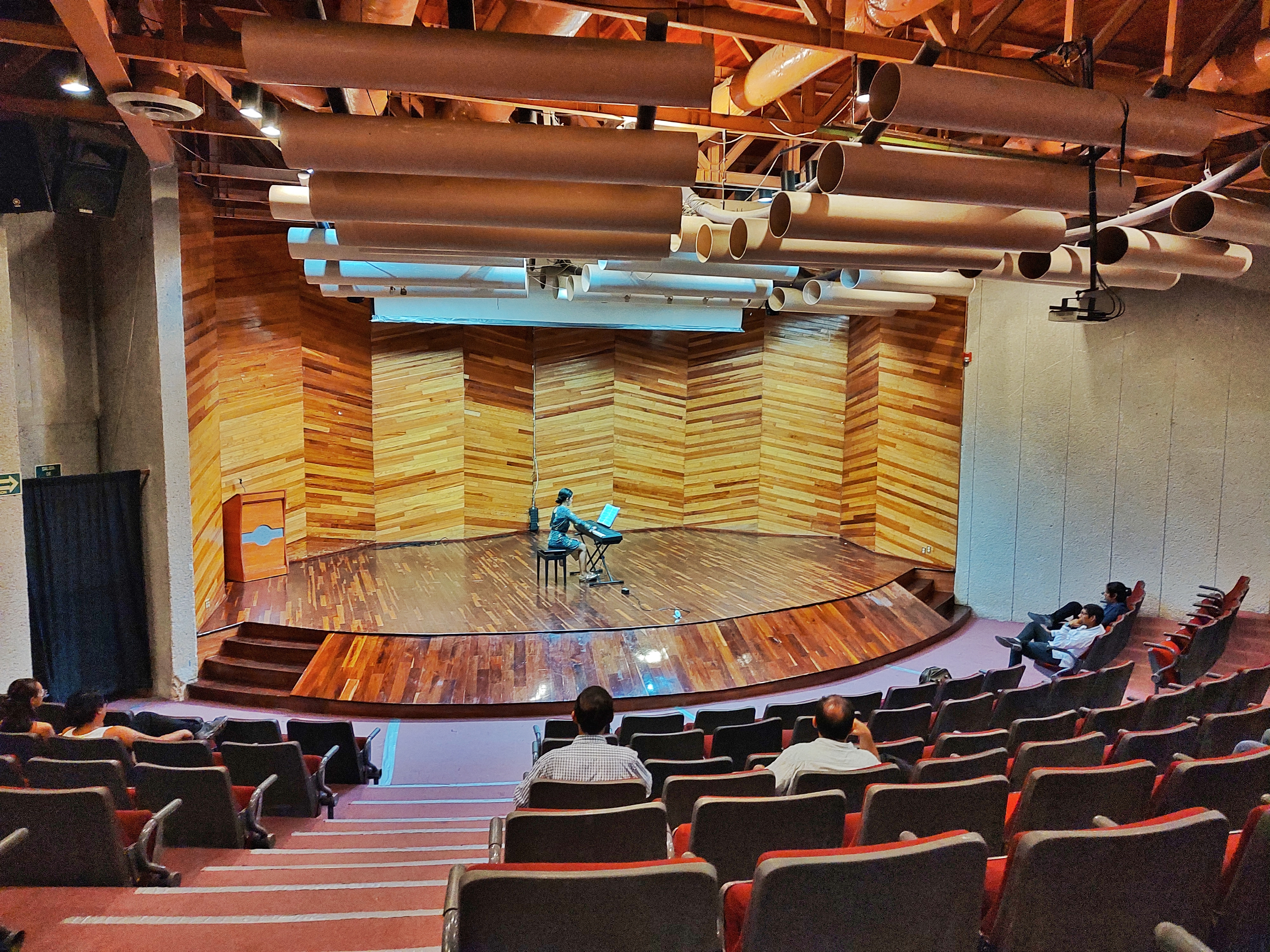
Main auditorium at the Centro Cultural Jaime Sabines, Tuxtla Gutiérrez

The Jaime Sabines International Poetry Prize, an initiative of the Chiapas State Government, the University of Sciences and Arts of Chiapas and the State Council for Culture and the Arts, was inaugurated in 1993.

The Centro Cultural de Chiapas Jaime Sabines in Tuxtla Gutiérrez was opened to the public in 2000. It houses the state library, two auditoriums, a book shop, and spaces for exhibitions and workshops.

== See also ==
- Mexican literature

== Notes ==
Preceded by Andrés Henestrosa Morales	Belisario Domínguez Medal of Honor; 1994	Succeeded by Miguel León-Portilla
