= Ignacio Burgoa =

Ignacio Burgoa Orihuela (March 13, 1918 – November 6, 2005) was a Mexican lawyer, professor, and writer.

He was a federal judge in Mexico City, and a respected lawyer in Mexico.

He studied law and obtained his PhD from the National Autonomous University of Mexico, where he taught for more than 58 years. He was author of the most renowned law books in his field in Mexico since 1943, when, at age 25, he published his first book El Juicio de Amparo ("The Amparo Trial") that was the first systematic treaty on the subject and has become the most read and referred book by specialists in the constitutional trial of amparo in Mexico. In 1944 he published his second book Las Garantías Individuales ("Constitutional Guarantees"), and in 1973 he published Derecho Constitucional Mexicano ("Mexican Constitutional Law"). These three books that have had tenths of editions, cover all of the constitutional topics in Mexico and are consulted and referred by all professors, attorneys and judges in Mexico, where he has been the most known attorney for decades.

From 1951 to 1954 he was a Federal Judge in Administrative Matters in Mexico City, a position in which he obtained a well earned reputation of just and wise. After he resigned from that charge, he dedicated his activity to litigating and teaching. In any case that was important or in the public eye, Ignacio Burgoa would be involved in one way or another, as an attorney, or simply assisting the persons involved with his very respected opinion. At any time that the media needed a legal opinion on public affairs they would consult him, as well as many authorities did. He had only the Constitution and the Law as his guiding lines and usually settled any differences as of which should be the interpretation of either one, even between authorities. He wrote articles in diverse Law Reviews and for several newspapers and magazines that dealt with public matters.

He spoke five languages: Latin, German, French, English and his native Spanish.

He is one of the most important Mexican attorneys, law professors and law writers of the twentieth century. A magistrate of the Supreme Court once referred to him as "The Conscience of Mexico".

In 1997, Burgoa spoke out against indigenous autonomy in Mexico, claiming that they "would return to human sacrifice".

== Selected works ==
- El Juicio de Amparo ("The Amparo Trial"), 1943
- Las Garantias Individuales ("Constitutional Guarantees"), 1944
- Derecho Constitucional Mexicano ("Mexican Constitutional Law"), 1973
- Diccionario de Derecho Constitucional, Garantías y Amparo (Dictionary of Constitutional Law, Guarantees and Protection), 1984
- Antología de su Pensamiento (Anthology of His Thinking), 1987.
- Memorias. Epítome Autobiográfico 1918–1996, (Memoirs), 1996
- El Jurista y el Simulador del Derecho (The Jurist and the Simulator of Law), 1988
- El Proceso de Cristo, 2000
