= LMT =

LMT may stand for:

== Places ==
- Klamath Falls Airport, Oregon, US (IATA code LMT)
- Lebanon Mountain Trail, a hiking trail in Lebanon

== Businesses and organizations ==
- Latvian Mobile Telephone
- Lewis Machine and Tool Company
- Lisa McPherson Trust, a defunct anti-Scientology organization
- Lockheed Martin, NYSE symbol (LMT)

== Other uses ==
- Licensed Massage Therapist
- Local Mean Time
- Large Millimeter Telescope
