= Ruy Pérez Tamayo =

Mexican doctor and researcher (1924–2022)

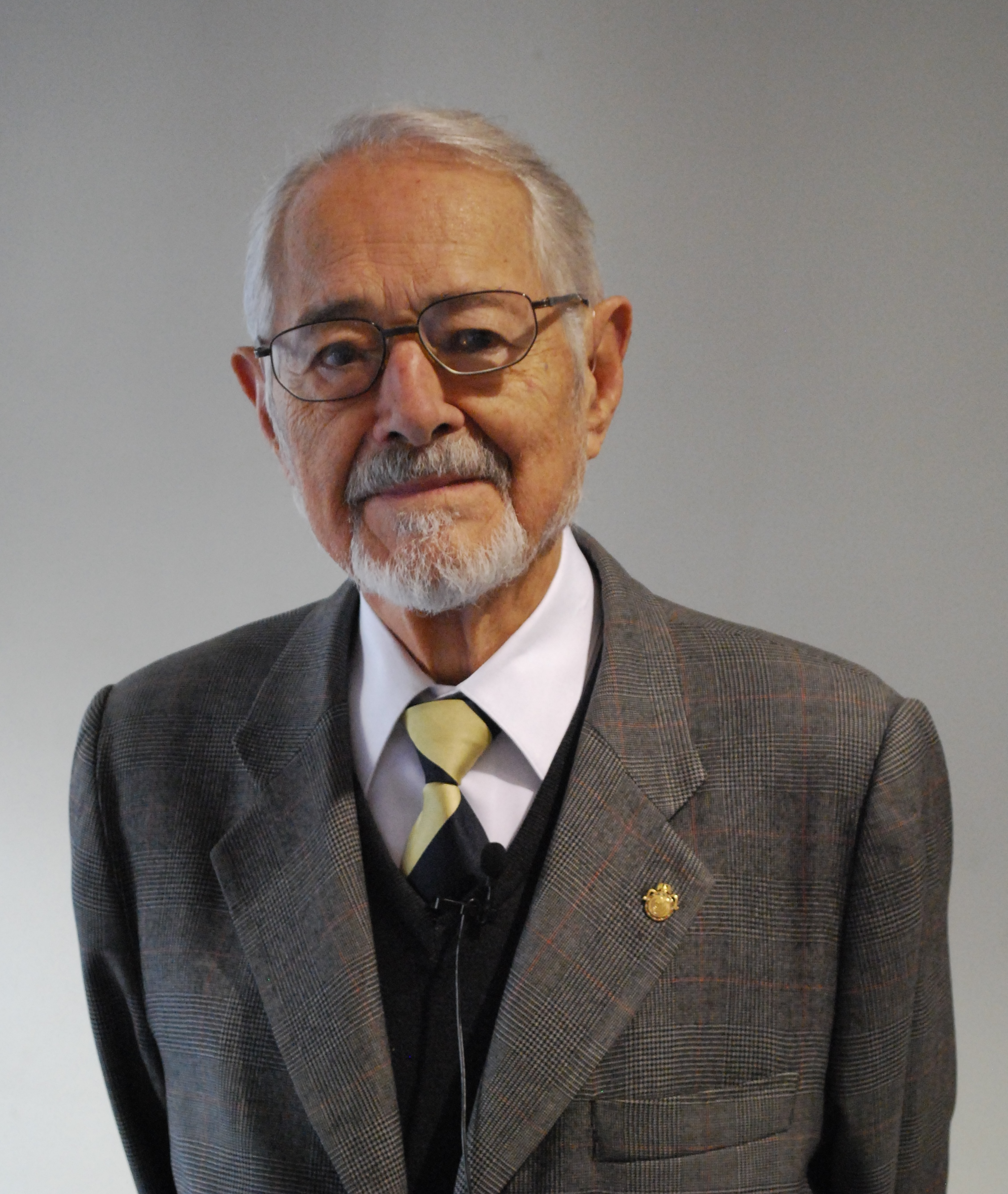
- Pérez Tamayo in 2014
- Born: 8 November 1924; Tampico, Tamaulipas, Mexico
- Died: 26 January 2022 (aged 97); Ensenada, Baja California, Mexico
- Occupation: Scientist

Ruy Pérez Tamayo (8 November 1924 – 26 January 2022) was a Mexican medical pathologist, immunologist, researcher, science communicator and academic.

== Life and career ==
Born in Tampico, Pérez Tamayo graduated in medicine and specialised in pathology at the National Autonomous University of Mexico, and then got a doctorate in immunology from the Instituto Politécnico Nacional in Mexico City. He was the founder and director of the pathology unit at the General Hospital of Mexico, and the director of the Department of Pathology at the National Institute of Nutrition for ten years. He was professor in his alma mater for 58 years, and was visiting professor in a large number of prestigious universities all over the world, including Harvard University, Yale University, and Johns Hopkins University.

He was the author of over 150 scientific articles and over 60 books, and had an important role in popularizing science to the Mexican general public.

During his life Pérez Tamayo was the recipient of several awards and accolades, including the National Prize for Arts and Sciences, the Juchimán de Plata Award and the Menéndez Pelayo International Prize. He was also a member of the Academia Mexicana de la Lengua since 1986, as well as of El Colegio Nacional and of the Advisory Council of Sciences of the Presidency of the Republic. He died in Ensenada, Baja California on 26 January 2022, at the age of 97.
