= Julio Collado-Vides =

Guatemalan scientist and professor

- Born: Pedro Julio Collado-Vides; February 14, 1957 (age 69)
- Education: National Autonomous University of Mexico
- Awards: Guggenheim Fellowship (1992)
- Scientific career
- Fields: Physical chemistry; Bioinformatics
- Thesis: (1989)

Julio Collado-Vides is a Guatemalan scientist and Professor of Computational Genomics at the National Autonomous University of Mexico. His research focuses on genomics and bioinformatics.

== Education ==
Collado-Vides studied at the National Autonomous University of Mexico, gaining a BSc in biomedical science (1983), an MSc in physical chemistry (1985) and a PhD in biomathematics (1989). Following his PhD, he carried out postdoctoral studies at the Massachusetts Institute of Technology (MIT).

== Work and research ==
Collado-Vides' research focuses on the regulation of gene expression in bacteria, in particular, creating a model of the regulatory network of E. coli K-12. The RegulonDB database (released in 2010) makes this data available. He has also been involved in the construction of the EcoCyc E. coli database and the completion of the sequenced E. coli genome.

He was the founding President of the Mexican Society of Genomics.

== Awards and honours ==
Collado-Vides is a member of the Mexican Academy of Sciences and was elected a Fellow of the International Society for Computational Biology in 2015.

== Books ==
- Integrative Approaches to Molecular Biology, 1996, MIT Press (edited with Boris Magasanik and Temple F. Smith) ISBN 9780262032391
- Gene Regulation and Metabolism: Post-Genomic Computational Approaches, 2002, MIT Press (edited with Ralf Hofestädt) ISBN 9780262032971
