= Alexander Balankin =

Russian-Mexican scientist (born 1958)

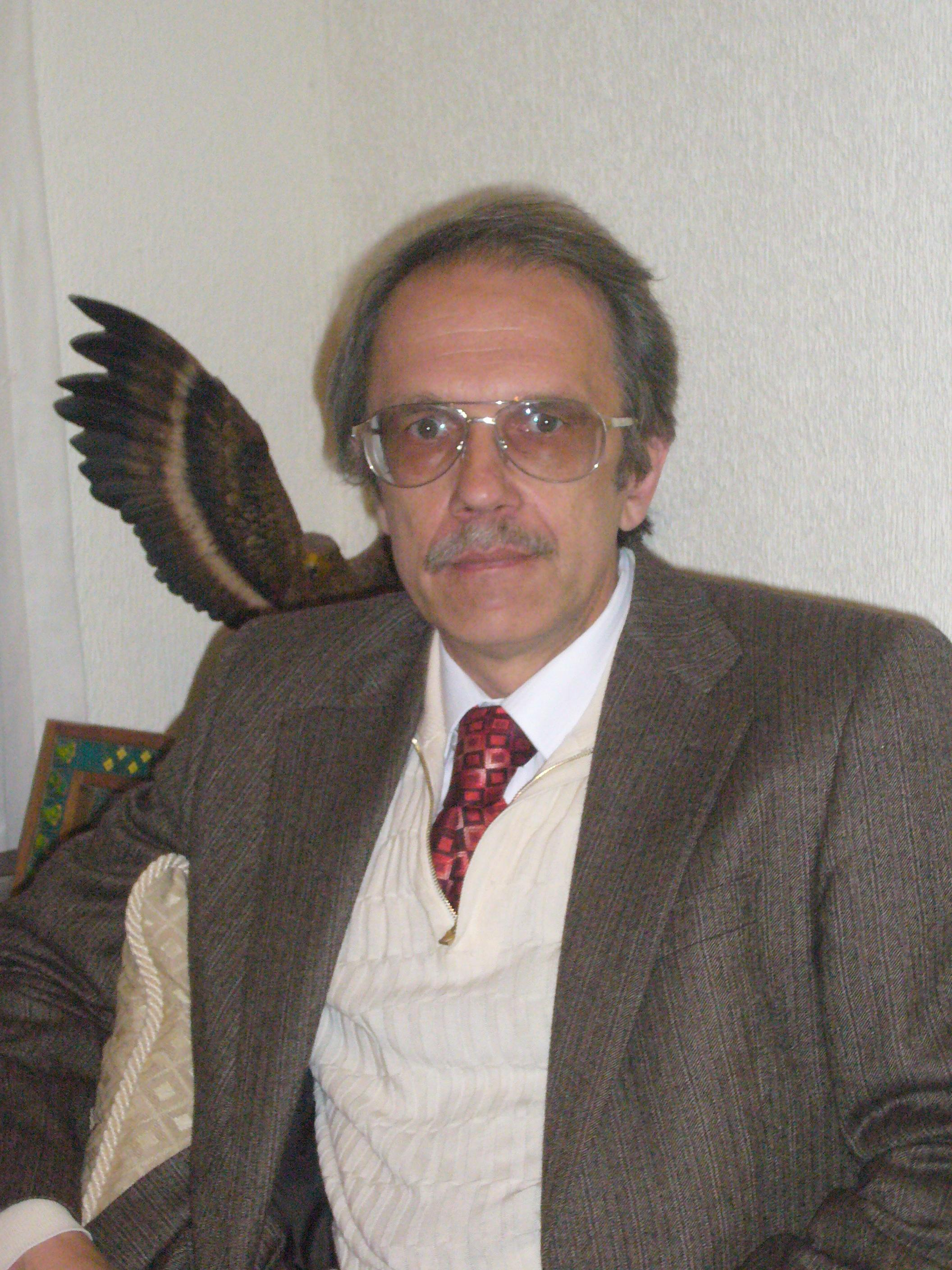
- Balankin in 2008
- Born: March 3, 1958 (age 68); Moscow, Soviet Union
- Education: Moscow Engineering Physics Institute
- Known for: Research in fractal mechanics and its technological applications
- Awards: UNESCO Science Prize (2005), National Prize of Arts and Sciences (2002), es:Presea Lázaro Cárdenas (2005)
- Scientific career
- Fields: Physics
- Workplaces: National Polytechnic Institute of Mexico

Alexander Balankin (born March 3, 1958) is a Russian-Mexican scientist (Баланкин, Александр Сергеевич) whose work in the field of fractal mechanics and its engineering applications won him the UNESCO Science Prize in 2005.

Currently he is a professor of physics at the National Polytechnic Institute of Mexico, Head of the Fractal Mechanics Group, and since 2003, a member of the Science Consulting Council of the Presidency of the Republic, Mexico.

== Early life and education ==
Alexander Balankin was born in Moscow, Soviet Union. He graduated from Moscow Engineering Physics Institute in 1981. He holds a Philosophy Doctorate in Physics and Mathematics from Moscow Engineering Physics Institute (1986). Five years after that, the Higher Attestation Commission (USSR) awarded him a Doctor of Science degree. In this period, he was also honoured with the state prize of the Russian Ministry of Defense (1990) and a prize from the Academy of Sciences of the USSR in 1991. In addition he has served as Member of the Council of the Union (former-USSR) for the Physics of Materials Resistance and Fracture (Russia, 1991–92). In 1992, Professor Balankin immigrated to Mexico and in 2000 became a Mexican citizen.

== Career ==
In 1997 Professor Balankin joined the Department of Electromechanical Engineering at the National Polytechnic Institute (IPN), after holding a position as full professor in the Monterrey Institute of Technology and Higher Education at Mexico City from 1992 to 1997. He also serves as an Adviser of the Mexican Institute of Petroleum and the Mexican Transport Institute and as a Consultant of the Mexican National Petroleum Company (PEMEX).

Since 2003 Professor Balankin is a Counselor of the Science Consulting Council of the President's Office, Mexico. He is a National Researcher of the highest level from the National System of Researchers and member of the Mexican Academy of Sciences. He has also held a number of other positions in Mexico, among them as a Counselor of the Membership Committee of the National System of Researchers (1999–2003) and as the Chairman of the Fracture Mechanics Symposium at the Annual International Materials Research Congress (1998–2009).

In 1998 Professor Balankin founded a National Interdisciplinary Research Group Fractal Mechanics as a joint venture between industry and university. He also created a laboratory of Fracture Mechanics at the National Polytechnic Institute and the Interuniversity Laboratory Fractal analysis of Complex Systems. He has directed 19 PhD dissertations and 18 MS theses many of which were recognized as the best at the National level.

== Research ==
Professor Balankin has done work in fractal solid mechanics, probabilistic fracture mechanics, and fluid flow through porous media. Specifically, he has developed the probabilistic mechanics of self-affine cracks. Balankin also has introduced the new concept of multifractal elasticity and has developed the theory of mechanical behaviour and fracture of composites with multifractal structures. In 1996, the development of new composite materials with multifractal microstructure, supervised by Professor Balankin, was recognized with the First Place Romulo Garza Prize for Research and Technological Development in Mexico in 1996.

From 2001, Professor Balankin has also been involved in a project of fractal study of soils, which is expected to introduce changes in agriculture technology.

== Honors and awards ==
Professor Balankin received the National Prize for Arts and Sciences in the area Technology and Design in 2002 and the UNESCO Science Prize in 2005, for his research in fractal mechanics to technological applications that has provided great benefits to Mexico and worldwide. In 2005 the President of Mexico has honoured the Professor Balankin with the Lazaro Cardenas' Gold Medal (Presea Lázaro Cárdenas). In 2009 Alexander Balankin was awards by the Juchimán de Plata Award (Mexico).

== Selected papers ==
- A. S. Balankin & B. E. Elizarraraz (13 February 2012). "Hydrodynamics of fractal continuum flow". Physical Review E. 85 (2) 025302. Bibcode:2012PhRvE..85b5302B. doi:10.1103/PhysRevE.85.025302. PMID 22463270.
- A. S. Balankin; E. García Otamendi; D. Samayoa; J. Patiño & M. A. Rodríguez (23 March 2012). "Depinning and creeplike motion of wetting fronts in weakly vibrated granular media" (PDF). Physical Review E. 85 (3) 036313. Bibcode:2012PhRvE..85c6313B. doi:10.1103/PhysRevE.85.036313. hdl:10261/51921. PMID 22587186.
- A. S. Balankin; S. Matías Gutierres; D. Samayoa Ochoa & J. Patiño Ortiz (17 March 2011). "Slow kinetics of water escape from randomly folded foils". Physical Review E. 83 (2) 036310. Bibcode:2011PhRvE..83c6310B. doi:10.1103/PhysRevE.83.036310. PMID 21517590. S2CID 2184973.
- A. S. Balankin; D. Samayoa; I. A. Miguel; J. Patiño & M. Á. Martínez (17 June 2010). "Fractal topology of hand-crumpled paper". Physical Review E. 81 (6) 061126. Bibcode:2010PhRvE..81f1126B. doi:10.1103/PhysRevE.81.061126. PMID 20866397.
- A. S. Balankin; D. Morales Matamoros; E. Pineda León; A. Horta Rangel; M. Á. Martínez Cruz & D. Samayoa Ochoa (23 May 2009). "Topological crossovers in the forced folding of self-avoiding matter". Physica A. 388 (9): 1780–1790. arXiv:0907.4451. Bibcode:2009PhyA..388.1780B. doi:10.1016/j.physa.2009.01.021. S2CID 119237483.
- A. S. Balankin; D. Samayoa; E. Pineda León; R. Cortes Montes de Oca; A. Horta; M. A. Martínez (24 March 2008). "Power law scaling of lateral deformations with universal Poisson's index for randomly folded thin sheets". Physical Review B. 77 (12) 125421. arXiv:0808.3275. Bibcode:2008PhRvB..77l5421B. doi:10.1103/PhysRevB.77.125421. S2CID 113402671.
- A. S. Balankin; R. Cortes Montes de Oca; D. Samayoa (10 September 2007). "Intrinsically anomalous self-similarity of randomly folded matter". Physical Review E. 76 (3) 032101. Bibcode:2007PhRvE..76c2101B. doi:10.1103/PhysRevE.76.032101. PMID 17930290. S2CID 24085768.
- A. S. Balankin; R. García Paredes; O. Susarrey; D. Morales & F. Castrejon (6 February 2006). "Kinetic Roughening and Pinning of Two Coupled Interfaces in Disordered Media". Physical Review Letters. 96 (5) 056101. Bibcode:2006PhRvL..96e6101B. doi:10.1103/PhysRevLett.96.056101. PMID 16486956. S2CID 19884272.
- K. Oleschko; G. Korvin; A. S. Balankin; R. V. Khachaturov; L. Flores; B. Figueroa; J. Urrutia & F. Brambila (10 October 2002). "Fractal Scattering of Microwaves from Soils". Physical Review Letters. 89 (18) 188501. Bibcode:2002PhRvL..89r8501O. doi:10.1103/PhysRevLett.89.188501. PMID 12398644.
- A. S. Balankin; O. Susarrey & A. Bravo (27 November 2001). "Self-affine nature of the stress-strain behavior of thin fiber networks". Physical Review E. 64 (6) 066131. Bibcode:2001PhRvE..64f6131B. doi:10.1103/PhysRevE.64.066131. PMID 11736260. S2CID 14989922.
- A. S. Balankin (1 March 1996). "Elastic behavior of materials with multifractal structures". Physical Review B. 53 (9): 5438–5443. Bibcode:1996PhRvB..53.5438B. doi:10.1103/PhysRevB.53.5438. PMID 9984150.
