= San Francisco Ixhuatán =

- Municipality and town
- Location within Mexico
- Coordinates: 16°21′N 94°29′W
- Country: Mexico
- State: Oaxaca

Area
  - Total: 406.99 km^{2} (157.14 sq mi)
- Elevation: 10 m (33 ft)

Population (2005)
  - Total: 9,050
- (municipal total)
- Time zone: UTC-6 (Central (US Central))
- Fiestas: 2 February, 17 October

San Francisco Ixhuatán is a town, and the surrounding municipality of the same name, in the Mexican state of Oaxaca. It is part of the Juchitán District in the west of the Istmo de Tehuantepec region. The Nahuatl name element Ixhuatán means "town of palm fronds".

== The town ==
In 1826, Ixhuatán was already established as an ejido in the municipality of San Francisco del Mar. In 1886 it became the municipal seat and, in 1926, it was separated from San Francisco del Mar to form a new, separate municipality as a result of political and administrative conflicts. It currently has 9050 inhabitants.

San Francisco Ixhuatán is located in the south of Oaxaca, at 16°21' N, 94°29' W, at a height of 10 metres above sea level.

== The municipality ==
The municipality covers a total of 406.99 km^{2}. As municipal seat, San Francisco Ixhuatán has governing jurisdiction over the following communities:

Cachimbo, Cerro Chico (Cerritos), Cerro Grande, Chahuites las Conchas, Colonia Primero de Mayo, El Milagro, El Naranjal, El Porvenir, La Curva (El Crucero), La Gloria, La Herradura, La Mora, Las Palmas, Lázaro Cárdenas, Paniagua, Río Viejo, Reforma Agraria Integral, and Veinte de Noviembre (El Morro)

== Sources ==
- Spanish Wikipedia article
- San Francisco Ixhuatán (Enciclopedia de los Municipios de México)
