= Christine Allen (astronomer) =

Mexican astronomer

Christine Patricia Allen Armiño is a Mexican astronomer whose research has included runaway stars including the Becklin–Neugebauer Object,^{[A]}^{[D]} the overall distribution of mass in the Milky Way and its effects on stellar orbits,^{[B]} binary and multiple star systems,^{[C]} and the applications of binary star observations in testing physical theories.^{[E]} She is a senior researcher at the Institute of Astronomy of the National Autonomous University of Mexico, and the editor of the Mexican Magazine of Astronomy and Astrophysics.

The galactic mass distribution model she developed with Alfredo Santillán^{[B]} has been called the Allen–Santillán model.

== Recognition ==
Allen is a member of the Mexican Academy of Sciences. UNAM gave her their Sor Juana Inés de la Cruz prize in 2008.

== Selected publications ==
A.	Poveda, A.; Ruiz, J.; Allen, C. (April 1967), "Run-away stars as the result of the gravitational collapse of proto-stellar clusters", Boletín de los Observatorios de Tonantzintla y Tacubaya, 4: 86–90, Bibcode:1967BOTT....4...86P

B.	Allen, Christine; Santillán, Alfredo (October 1991), "An improved model of the galactic mass distribution for orbit computations", Revista Mexicana de Astronomía y Astrofísica, 22: 255, Bibcode:1991RMxAA..22..255A

C.	Poveda, A.; Herrera, M. A.; Allen, C.; Cordero, G.; Lavalley, C. (April 1994), "Statistical studies of visual double and multiple stars, II: a catalogue of nearby wide binary and multiple systems", Revista Mexicana de Astronomía y Astrofísica, 28: 43–89, Bibcode:1994RMxAA..28...43P

D.	Rodríguez, Luis F.; Poveda, Arcadio; Lizano, Susana; Allen, Christine (June 2005), "Proper motions of the BN object and the radio source I in Orion: Where and when did the BN Object become a runaway star?", The Astrophysical Journal, 627 (1): L65 – L68, arXiv:astro-ph/0504134, Bibcode:2005ApJ...627L..65R, doi:10.1086/432052

E.	Monroy-Rodríguez, Miguel A.; Allen, Christine (July 2014), "The end of the MACHO era, revisited: New limits on MACHO masses from halo wide binaries", The Astrophysical Journal, 790 (2): 159, arXiv:1406.5169, Bibcode:2014ApJ...790..159M, doi:10.1088/0004-637x/790/2/159
