= Leticia Carigi =

Venezuelan astronomer

María Leticia Carigi Delgado is a Venezuelan astronomer specializing in cosmochemistry, including the overall metallicity of galaxies and galactic halos, and the evolution of galaxies. She works in Mexico as a researcher and professor in the Institute of Astronomy of the National Autonomous University of Mexico (UNAM).

== Education and career ==
Carigi earned master's and doctoral degrees in astronomy through research in Venezuela's Centro de Investigaciones de Astronomia. She completed her Ph.D. in 1994, at the Central University of Venezuela, with the dissertation Evolución química de la vecindad solar con rendimientos químicos estelares dependientes de la metalicidad [Chemical evolution of the solar neighborhood with stellar chemical yields dependant on metallicity], supervised by Gustavo Ramón Bruzual Alfonso.

She came to the UNAM Institute of Astronomy as a postdoctoral researcher, working with Manuel Peimbert, and has been a research professor there since 1995.

== Recognition ==
Carigi is a member of the Mexican Academy of Sciences. In 2010 UNAM gave her their Sor Juana Ines de la Cruz prize.
