= Julieta Fierro =

Mexican astrophysicist (1948–2025)

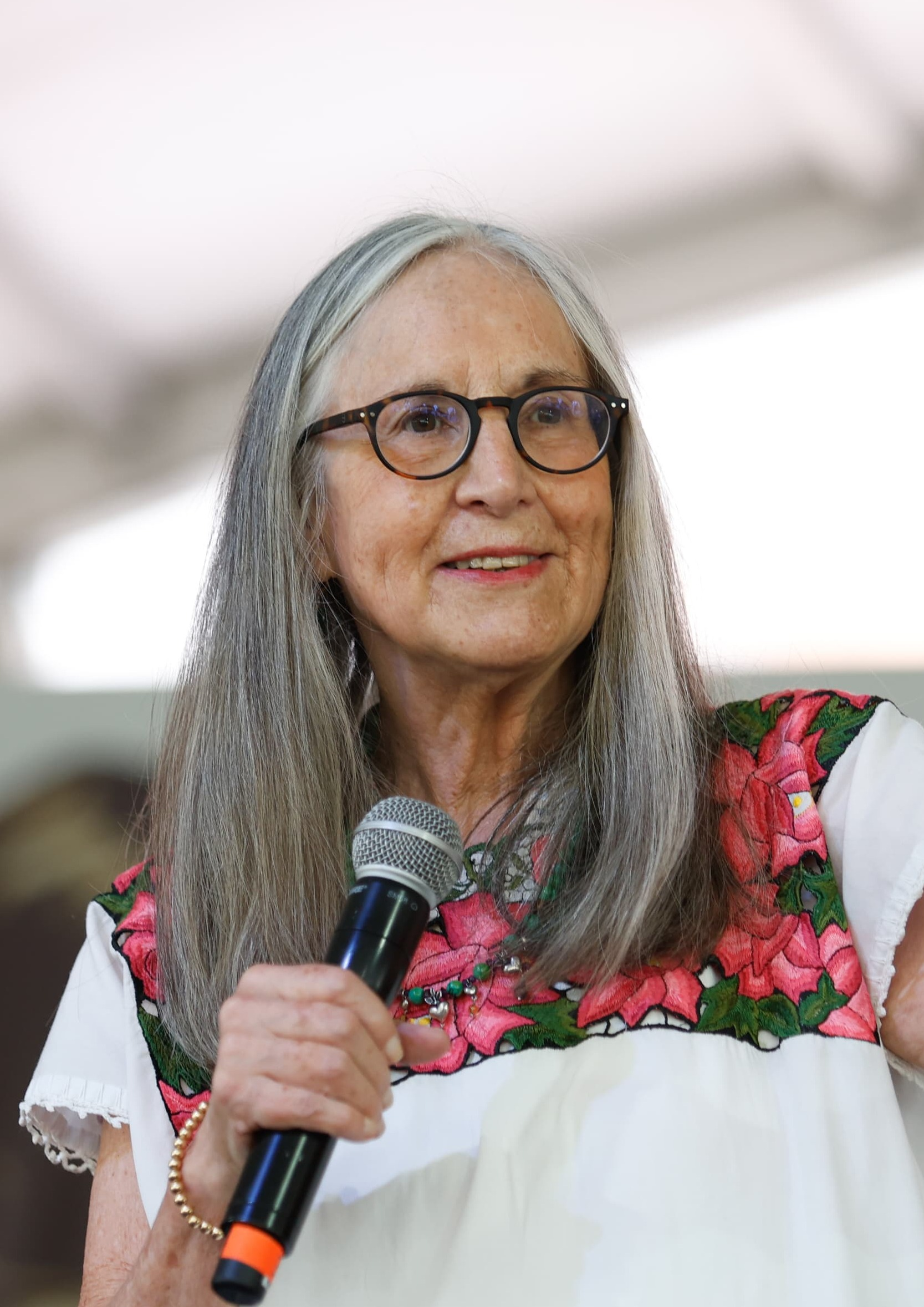
- Fierro in 2024
- Born: February 24, 1948; Mexico City, Mexico
- Died: September 19, 2025 (aged 77)
- Education: National Autonomous University of Mexico (BS, MS)
- Occupation: Astrophysicist
- Awards: Kalinga Prize (1995); Klumpke-Roberts Award (1998)
- Scientific career
- Fields: Astrophysics, science communication
- Workplaces: National Autonomous University of Mexico

Julieta Norma Fierro Gossman (February 24, 1948 – September 19, 2025), better known as Julieta Fierro, was a Mexican astrophysicist and science communicator. She was a full researcher at the Institute of Astronomy and professor of the Science Faculty at the National Autonomous University of Mexico (UNAM) and was a level-III member of the National System of Researchers (SNI). Since 2004, she was a member of the Mexican Academy of Language.

Her research was focused on the study of the interstellar medium and her later research involved the study of the Solar System. Nonetheless, she is most known for her science communication work. She held three honoris causa doctorates, and several laboratories, libraries, planetariums, astronomical societies, and schools have her name.

== Background ==
Julieta Fierro was born in Mexico City on February 24, 1948. She studied physics at the UNAM School of Sciences and obtained her degree in 1974. Afterwards she earned a masters in Astrophysics at the same institution. She was a researcher in the Institute of Astronomy at UNAM and a full professor at the School of Sciences of the same university.

From March 2000 to January 2004, she was UNAM's General Director of Scientific Outreach. She has held positions such as vice president and president of the Education Commission of the International Astronomical Union and president of the Mexican Academy of Natural Sciences Teachers and of the Mexican Association of Science and Technology Museums. She also belonged to the board of directors of the Astronomical Society of the Pacific, which is focused on communicating science to improve education.

Fierro Gossman was elected a member of the Academia Mexicana de la Lengua on July 24, 2003, and took possession of its 25th chair on August 26, 2004, with a lecture entitled Imaginemos un Caracol (Let's Imagine a Snail). She was elected a corresponding member of the Royal Spanish Academy on April 21, 2005.

Fierro Gossman died on September 19, 2025, at the age of 77.

== Science communication ==
Throughout her career, she wrote 40 books, of which 23 are on popular science. She published dozens of articles in national and international journals. One of her pieces of writing was published in Mayan (an indigenous language in Mexico). She gave hundreds of talks and lectures, and designed multiple science workshops for children with the purpose of communicating science to broader audiences. During 2020 she published a series of scientific activities to perform at home during the lockdown periods due to the COVID-19 pandemic in Mexico.

Fierro Gossman participated in the creation of the astronomy room at Universum, one of the most popular university museums in Latin America. She was the director of Universum and of the Museo Descubre in Aguascalientes. She collaborated on the creation of a science museum in Puerto Rico and the McDonald Observatory in the United States and the Sutherland in South Africa. She collaborated actively with Universum, the Museum of Natural Sciences, the Museo de la Luz ("Museum of Light"), the McDonald Observatory in Texas and Puerto Rico, and with the Global Fair in Japan.

She participated in thousands of radio shows where she read about science and spoke about her passion for it. Sometimes she invited other scientists and interview them to enrich the conversation. She hosted a television series titled Más allá de las estrellas ("Beyond the Stars"), which was chosen as the best science show in Mexico in 1998. Her later collaborations with Mexican television included the show called Sofía Luna, agente espacial ("Special Agent Sofía Luna") on the National Polytechnic Institute's Canal Once.

=== Selected publications ===
- La astronomía de México. Lectorum, 2001, ISBN 968-5270-55-4. Reissued in 2005.
- Albert Einstein: Un científico de nuestro tiempo. Co-authored with Héctor Domínguez, Lectorum, 2005, ISBN 970-32-1108-9.
- Lo grandioso de la luz, Gran paseo por la ciencia. Editorial Nuevo México, 2005, ISBN 970-677-181-6.
- Lo grandioso del tiempo, Gran paseo por la ciencia. Editorial Nuevo México, 2005, ISBN 970-677-179-4.
- Cartas Astrales: Un romance científico del tercer tipo. Co-authored with Adolfo Sánchez Valenzuela, Alfaguara, 2006, ISBN 968-19-1175-X.
- La luz de las estrellas. Co-authored with Héctor Domínguez. Ediciones La Vasija, 2006, ISBN 970-756-095-9.
- Galileo y el telescopio, 400 años de ciencia. Co-authored with Héctor Domínguez. Uribe y Ferrari Editores, 2007, ISBN 970-756-238-2.
- Newton, la luz y el movimiento de los cuerpos. Co-authored with Héctor Domínguez. Uribe y Ferrari Editores, 2007, ISBN 9789707562820.

From the collection Ciencia para todos ("Science for Everyone") from the Fondo de Cultura Económica, her main works are:

- La Evolución Química del Sol. Co-authored with Manuel Peimbert Sierra, 2012, ISBN 978-607-16-12373.
- Nebulosas planetarias: la hermosa muerte de las estrellas. Co-authored with Silvia Torres Castilleja, 2009, ISBN 978-607-16-0072-1.
- Fronteras el universo. Book compiled by Manuel Peimbert Sierra (compiler), Silvia Torres Castilleja, Miguel Ángel Herrera, Miriam Peña, Luis Felipe Rodríguez, Dany Page, José Jesús González, Deborah Dultzin, 2000, ISBN 9789681661038. Wrote one chapter about planetary systems.
- La familia del Sol, co-authored with Miguel Ángel Herrera, 1989, ISBN 978-968-16-7076-4.

== Awards and recognitions ==
Throughout her career she was awarded multiple prizes and her work was recognized by different institutions:

- Third World Network of Scientific Organizations outreach award, 1992.
- Kalinga Prize, UNESCO, 1995.
- Primo Rovis Gold Medal, Trieste Center of Astrophysical Theory, 1996.
- Klumpke-Roberts Award, Astronomical Society of the Pacific, 1998.
- National Award for Science Journalism, 1998.
- Latin American Award for the Popularization of Science, Chile, 2001.
- Citizen's Medal of Merit from the Mexico City Assembly of Representatives, 2003.
- Benito Juárez Medal, 2004.
- Flama Recognition, Autonomous University of Nuevo León, 2005.
- Vasco de Quiroga Medal, 2011.
- TWAS-ROLAC Regional Prize, 2017.
- Medal for the Scientific Merit, 2021. Engineer Mario Molina.
- Elected to the American Academy of Arts and Sciences, 2023. Class I – Mathematical and Physical Sciences. Section 4 – Astronomy, Astrophysics, and Earth Sciences.

=== Honorary degrees ===
- 2006: Awarded by CITEM
- 2009: Awarded by Coordinadora de Identidades Territoriales Mapuche and Michoacan University of Saint Nicholas of Hidalgo.
- 2017: Awarded by Universidad Autónoma Benito Juárez de Oaxaca.
