= Peimbert =

Peimbert is a surname. Notable people with the surname include:

- Manuel Peimbert (born 1941), Mexican astronomer
- Marcela Torres Peimbert (born 1961), Mexican politician
- Raul Peimbert (born 1962), Mexican-American newscaster
- Silvia Torres-Peimbert (born 1940), Mexican astronomer, wife of Manuel
