= Paris Pişmiş =

Turkish-Mexican astronomer

- Born: 30 January 1911; Ortaköy, Istanbul
- Died: 1 August 1999 (aged 88)

Marie Paris Pişmiş de Recillas (Armenian: Բարիզ Փիշմիշ, 30 January 1911 – 1 August 1999) was a Armenian-Mexican astronomer.

Pişmiş was born Mari Sukiasian (Armenian: Մարի Սուքիասեան) in 1911, in Ortaköy, Istanbul. She completed her high school studies at Üsküdar American Academy. In 1937, she became the first woman to get a Ph.D. from the Science Faculty of Istanbul University. Her advisor was Erwin Finlay Freundlich. Later, she went to Harvard University where she met her future husband Félix Recillas, a Mexican mathematician. They settled in Mexico, and she became the first professional astronomer in Mexico. According to Dorrit Hoffleit, "she is the one person most influential in establishing Mexico’s importance in astronomical education and research".

For more than 50 years she worked at UNAM which awarded her a number of prizes including the "Science Teaching Prize". She was a member of the Mexican Academy of Sciences.

Pişmiş studied among others the kinematics of galaxies, H II nebulae, the structure of open star clusters and planetary nebulae. She compiled the catalogue Pismis of 24 open clusters and 2 globular clusters in the southern hemisphere.

In 1998, she published an autobiography entitled "Reminiscences in the Life of Paris Pişmiş: a Woman Astronomer". She died in 1999. According to her wish, she was cremated. Her daughter Elsa Recillas Pishmish, son-in-law Carlos Cruz-González, and grand-daughter Irene Cruz-González also became astronomers.

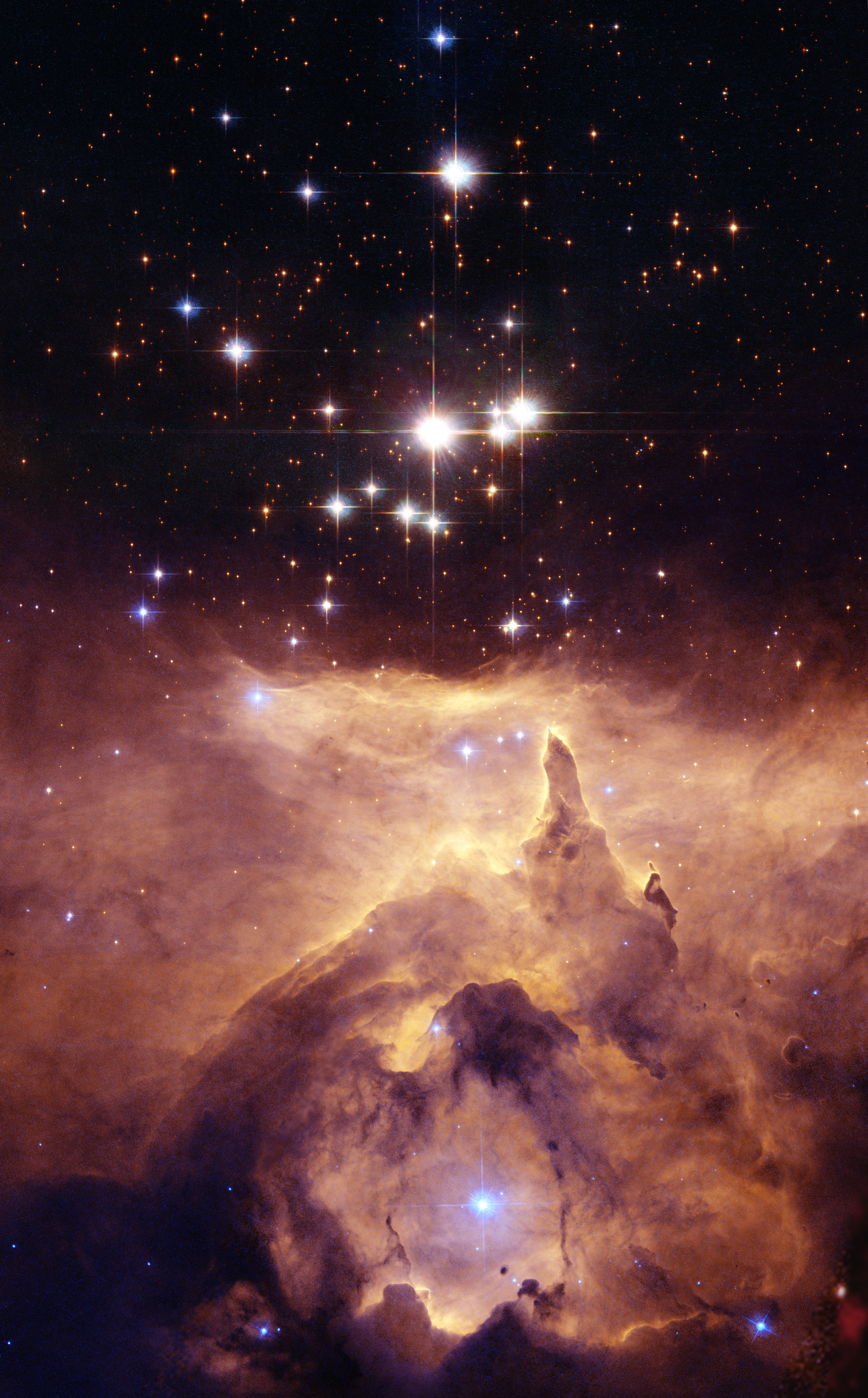
Hubble image of Pismis 24, one of the HII regions identified in her catalogue.
