= María Elena Medina-Mora Icaza =

Mexican psychologist and researcher

- Born: María Elena Lazo de Mendizábal; 3 October 1951 (age 75); Mexico City, Mexico

Academic background
- Education: Ibero-American University (1976 BA); Universidad Ibero Americana (1979 Psy.M.); National Autonomous University of Mexico (1993 PhD); The Autonomous University of Nuevo Leon (2009 PhD)

Academic work
- Institutions: National Autonomous University of Mexico, Center for Research in Global Mental Health, Mexican Ministry of Health, National System of Researchers

María Elena Medina-Mora Icaza (born 3 October 1951) is a Mexican researcher and psychologist. Medina-Mora Icaza was inducted into El Colegio Nacional on 6 March 2006.

== Early life and education ==
Medina-Mora Icaza was born on 3 October 1951, in Mexico City. She obtained her primary education at the Colegio Francés del Pedregal from 1955 to 1961. She attended Palos Verdes & Margate School for junior high school from 1962 to 1963. She then returned to the French College of Pedregal for high school (1964-1970). Following high school, she obtained licensure to practice social and clinical psychology (1970-1974). Once licensed, she obtained her Bachelor of Psychology (1976) and her Master's in Psychology (1979) at the Ibero-American University. In 1993, she obtained her Ph.D. in social psychology at the National Autonomous University of Mexico (UNAM), and later received an honorary Ph.D. from the Autonomous University of Nuevo Leon (2009).

== Career ==
Medina-Mora Icaza is an expert in mental health and addiction and is a faculty member of UNAM’s medical and psychology departments. Furthermore, she has been working with the Mexican government since 2003. She was the director of the National Institute of Psychiatry Ramon de la Fuente Muñiz and worked with the Secretary of Health from 2008 to 2018. The day after stepping down from the director position at the National Institute of Psychiatry, she was promoted to the coordinator position. In addition, as of 2019, she is the director of the mental health and psychiatric department at UNAM.

Medina-Mora Icaza works as a level three researcher with the Sistema Nacional de Investigadores and is a member of the El Colegio Nacional, the Mexican Academy of Sciences, the National Academy of Medicine (Academia Nacional de Medicina), and the National College of Psychologists (Colegio Nacional de Psicólogos). Medina-Mora Icaza also serves on the editorial committee for the following journals: Mental Health (Salud Mental), the Journal of Personality and Social Psychology, Mexican Magazine of Psychology and Public Health, Hispanic Journal of Behavioral Sciences, Addiction (UK), and Psychiatry (Spain).

Since becoming the director of the psychology department at UNAM, Medina-Mora Icaza has proposed implementing new policies. Her most notable policy is the ‘’Zero Tolerance’’ policy regarding gender violence.

== Research ==
Some of her most recent research has focused on how COVID-19 and quarantining have affected the mental health of the Mexican populace. She has warned that mental illness cases are on the rise, and with that in mind, about 30% of the population has yet to receive governmental aid. This is likely attributed to the fact that the Secretary of Health only channels 2.2% of their resources into the treatment of mental health. Medina-Mora Icaza also mentions how a good number of COVID-19 survivors experience outcomes ranging from delusions, psychosis, and even serious neurological disorders. Other common lingering ailments due to COVID-19 include headaches, altered consciousness, convulsions, and the absence of taste and smell. She has found that the prevalence of anxiety disorders and antisocial behaviours is greatest among youth between 12 and 17 years of age, which also happens to be the same demographic that is second in the consumption of drugs. Furthermore, the prevalence of mental disorders has increased among those between 18 and 26 years of age. She warns that merely treating mental illness isn’t enough; we must also strive to remedy the social determinants that cause mental illness.

== Selected works ==
- Borges, G., Benjet, C., Orozco, R., & Medina-Mora, M. E. (October 2018). A longitudinal study of reciprocal risk between mental and substance use disorders among Mexican youth. Journal of psychiatric research
- Goodman-Meza, D., Medina-Mora, M. E., Magis-Rodríguez, C., Landovitz, R. J., Shoptaw, S., & Werb, D. (2019). Where is the opioid use epidemic in Mexico? A cautionary tale for policymakers south of the US-Mexico border. American journal of public health, 109(1), 73–82.
- Marsiglia, F. F., Medina-Mora, M. E., Gonzalvez, A., Alderson, G., Harthun, M., Ayers, S., Gutiérrez, B. N., Corona, M. D., Melendez, M., & Kulis, S. (2019). Binational cultural adaptation of the Keepin' it REAL Substance Use Prevention Program for Adolescents in Mexico. Prevention science : the official journal of the Society for Prevention Research, 20(7), 1125–1135.
- Patel, V., Chisholm, D., Parikh, R., Charlson, F. J., Degenhardt, L., Dua, T., Ferrari, A. J., Hyma, S., Whiteford, H., Thornicroft, G., Vijayakumar, L., Shidhaye, R., Scott, J., Petersen, I., Mora, M. E. M., Lund, C., Levin, C., & Laxminarayan, R. (7 October 2015). Addressing the burden of mental, neurological, and substance use disorders: key messages from Disease Control Priorities, 3rd edition. The Lancet.
- Patel, V., Saxena, S., Lund, C., Thornicroft, G., Baingana, F., Bolton, P., Chisholm, D., Collins, P. Y., Cooper, J. L., Eaton, J., Herrman, H., Herzallah, M. M., Huang, Y., Jordans, M. J. D., Kleinman, A., Mora, M. E. M., Morgan, E., Niaz, U., Omigbodun, O., … UnÜtzer, J. Ü. (2 November 2018). The Lancet Commission on global mental health and sustainable development. The Lancet.
- Torralba, J., Mendoza, M. P., Grynberg, B., Zarco, V., & Medina-Mora, M. (June 2018). (PDF) Program De Orientacion y Atencion Psicologica para jovenes universitarios de la UNAM caracteristicas de la poblacion que solicita sus servicios. Research Gate.
- Volkow, N. D., Icaza, M., Poznyak, V., Saxena, S., Gerra, G., & UNODC-WHO Informal Scientific Network (2019). Addressing the opioid crisis globally. World psychiatry : official journal of the World Psychiatric Association (WPA), 18(2), 231–232.
