= El Colegio Nacional (Mexico) =

Mexican honorary academy

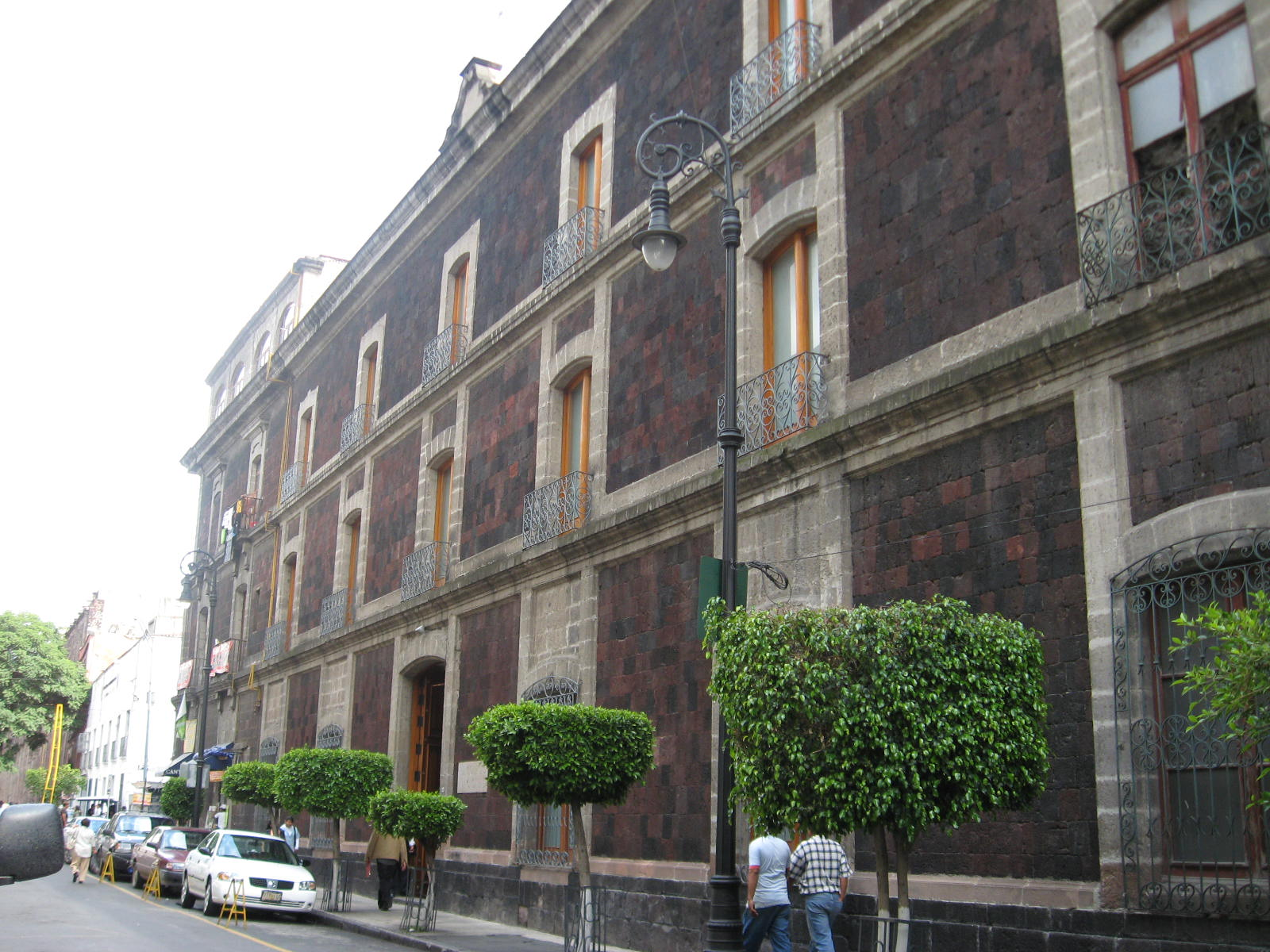
- The National College, located on Luis González Obregón Street in the historic center of Mexico City.
- Formation: 15 May 1943
- Location(s): Mexico City; 19°26′11.57″N 99°7′55.97″W
- Region served: Mexico
- Members: 40
- Official language: Spanish-language
- President: Leonardo López Luján
- Website: colnal.mx

The National College (Spanish: Colegio Nacional) is a Mexican honorary academy with a strictly limited membership created by presidential decree in 1943 in order to bring together the country's foremost artists and scientists, who are periodically invited to deliver lectures and seminars in their respective area of speciality. Membership is generally a lifelong commitment, although it could be forfeited under certain conditions. It should not be confused with El Colegio de México, a public institution of higher education and research.

== History ==
The college was founded on 8 April 1943. with the purpose of promoting Mexican culture and scholarship in a number of different fields. Its motto is "Libertad por saber" (Freedom through knowing) and its emblem is an eagle taking off (symbolizing freedom of thought) above a flaming sun (representing wisdom). The college's foundation decree, signed by General Manuel Ávila Camacho, limited membership to twenty Mexican-born citizens, who were supposed to deliver their lectures and or seminars in its official premises at Mexico City. A subsequent amendment signed by President Luis Echeverría in 1971 increased the limit to forty and members were given the choice of delivering both their lectures or seminars in places other than the capital. Those aged 70 and over were released, at their discretion, from that obligation. Naturalized Mexicans can also been appointed, provided that at least ten years had passed since they acquired citizenship.

In 1995, President Ernesto Zedillo amended the rules so that naturalized Mexicans could be admitted to the college irrespective of the date on which they acquired citizenship.

== Building ==
The property on which the Colegio sits used to belong to the Convent of La Enseñanza. When the convent was closed in 1863, due to the Reform Laws, this site first became the Palace of Justice. Later, the property was split to house the General Notary Archives and the Colegio. The building took on its present appearance in 1871. During the presidency of Lázaro Cárdenas, the building was used by the Unified Socialist Youth Movement.

The main access to the building is from Luis Gonzalez Obregon Street, between Rep. de Argentina and Rep. de Brazil Streets. This used to be the back entrance to the convent. The facade of the building has three levels and is covered in tezontle, a blood-red, porous, volcanic stone. The doors, windows and balconies are framed in chiluca, a greyish-white stone. The windows and balconies have ironwork railings and window guards. The main entrance leads to an entrance hall, which leads to a central patio. The ground floor of the patio is marked with pilasters while the upper level has columns. The main room in the building is the assembly hall, where debates take place, new members are initiated and congresses in the college's various specialities are conducted.

The building houses a collection of nine gilded altarpieces that date from the end of the 17th century, with the largest of these dedicated to the Our Lady of the Pillar. Among the paintings on display are "The Assumption of Mary" and "The Virgin of the Book of Revelation Apocalypse", both done by Andres Lopez in 1779.

== Members ==
The first date is the admission date to The National College; the second is the date of death or resignation/expulsion.

=== Founders ===
- Alfonso Reyes, writer and diplomat
- Diego Rivera, painter and muralist
- José Vasconcelos, writer and philosopher
- José Clemente Orozco, painter and muralist
- Enrique González Martínez, poet and diplomat
- Ezequiel A. Chávez, jurist
- Antonio Caso, philosopher
- Ignacio Chávez, cardiologist
- Isaac Ochoterena
- Manuel Uribe y Troncoso, ophthalmologist
- Carlos Chávez, composer
- Mariano Azuela, novelist of the Mexican Revolution
- Manuel Sandoval Vallarta, MIT cosmic ray physicist, former mentor of Richard Feynman and Julius Stratton.
- Alfonso Caso, archaeologist
- Ezequiel Ordóñez, geologist

=== Members admitted in the 20th century ===
- Ignacio González Guzmán (22 November 1943; † 2 December 1946) Haemotology and cytology
- Manuel Toussaint (21 January 1946; † 2 December 1946) Art history and criticism
- Silvio Zavala (6 January 1947; † December 4, 2014) History
- Arturo Rosenblueth (6 October 1947; † 20 September 1970) Physiology
- Antonio Castro Leal (9 August 1948; † 7 January 1981) Humanities
- Jesús Silva Herzog (16 November 1948; † 13 March 1985) Economics
- Gerardo Murillo "Dr. Atl" (6 November 1950; resigned 7 May 1951) Painting
- Daniel Cosío Villegas (2 April 1951; † 10 March 1976) History
- Samuel Ramos (8 July 1952; † 20 June 1959) Philosophy
- Agustín Yáñez (8 July 1952; † 17 January 1980) Literature
- Guillermo Haro (6 July 1953; † 27 April 1988) Astronomy
- Jaime Torres Bodet (6 July 1953; † 15 May 1974) Poetry and literary criticism
- Manuel Martínez Báez (7 March 1955; † 19 January 1987) Preventive medicine
- Eduardo García Máynez (4 November 1957; † 2 September 1993) Philosophy of law
- José Adem (4 April 1960; † 14 February 1991) Mathematics
- José Villagrán García (4 April 1960; † 10 June 1982) Architecture
- Antonio Gómez Robledo (7 October 1960; † 3 October 1994) Law and philosophy
- Victor L. Urquidi (18 October 1960; resigned 1 January 1968) Economics
- Octavio Paz (1 August 1967; † 19 April 1998) Poetry and literature, recipient of the 1995 Nobel Prize in Literature.
- Miguel León-Portilla (23 March 1971; † 1 October 2019) Ancient Mexican history
- Ignacio Bernal (4 April 1972; † 24 January 1992) Anthropology
- Rubén Bonifaz Nuño (4 April 1972; † 31 January 2013) Poetry and literature
- Antonio Carrillo Flores (4 April 1972; † 20 March 1987) Law
- Ramón de la Fuente (4 April 1972; † 31 March 2006) Psychiatrist; chaired the National Academy of Medicine, served as vice-president of World Psychiatric Association and founded the Mexican Institute of Psychiatry.
- Carlos Fuentes (4 April 1972; † 15 May 2012) Novels and literature
- Alfonso García Robles (4 April 1972; † 2 September 1991) International law
- Marcos Moshinsky (4 April 1972; † 1 April 2009) Theoretical physicist; winner of the UNESCO Science Prize.
- Jesús Romo Armeria (4 April 1972; † 14 May 1977) Applied chemistry
- Emilio Rosenblueth (4 April 1972; † 11 January 1994) Seismic engineering
- Fernando Salmerón (4 April 1972; † 31 May 1997) Philosophy
- Ramón Xirau (1 October 1973; † 26 July 2017) Philosophy
- Julián Adem (23 October 1974; † 9 September 2015) Geophysics
- Carlos Casas Campillo (23 October 1974; † 6 October 1994) Microbiology
- Héctor Fix-Zamudio (23 October 1974; † 27 January 2021) Legal procedure and comparative law
- Jesús Kumate (23 October 1974; † 7 May 2018) Immunology
- Jaime García Terrés (23 October 1974; † 29 April 1996) Poetry and literature
- Bernardo Sepúlveda Gutiérrez (24 October 1975; † 17 March 1985) Gastroenterology
- Leopoldo Solís (13 October 1976; † 25 June 2021) Economics
- Leopoldo García-Colín (12 September 1977; † 8 October 2012) Physicist; winner of the 1988 National Prize for Arts and Sciences and former chair of the Mexican Society of Physics (1972–1973).
- Luis González y González (8 November 1978; † 13 December 2003) History of Mexico
- Luis Villoro (14 November 1978; † 5 March 2014) Philosophy
- Ruy Pérez Tamayo (27 November 1980; † 26 January 2022) Pathology
- Salvador Elizondo (28 April 1981; † 29 March 2006) Literature and literary criticism
- Antonio Alatorre (26 June 1981; † 21 October 2010) Philology
- Guillermo Soberón Acevedo (5 November 1981; † 12 October 2020) Biochemistry and higher education
- Gustavo Cabrera Acevedo] (19 November 1981; † 22 November 2002) demographer; winner of the 1981 National Prize for Demography.
- Marcos Mazari Menzer (11 November 1982; † 24 January 2013) Nuclear physics
- Eduardo Mata (9 August 1984; † 4 January 1995) Music
- Gabriel Zaid (26 September 1984) Poetry and literature
- Beatriz de la Fuente (7 May 1985; † 20 June 2005) Art history. First woman admitted to El Colegio Nacional
- Adolfo Martínez Palomo (6 June 1985) Pathology and cellular biology
- José Emilio Pacheco (9 October 1986; † 26 January 2014) Novels and literature
- Samuel Gitler Hammer (9 October 1986; † 9 September 2014) Mathematics
- José Sarukhán Kermez (26 June 1987) Biology
- Arcadio Poveda Ricalde (1 March 1989; † 24 March 2022) Astronomy
- Teodoro González de León (28 October 1989; † 16 September 2016) Architecture
- Rufino Tamayo (21 May 1991; † 24 June 1991) Painting
- Pablo Rudomín (25 February 1993) Physiology
- Manuel Peimbert (24 May 1993) Astronomy
- Eduardo Matos Moctezuma (24 June 1993) Archaeology
- Donato Alarcón Segovia (9 November 1994; † 21 December 2004) Medicine
- Vicente Rojo (16 November 1994; † 17 March 2021) artist; recipient of the National Prize for Arts and Sciences.
- Francisco Bolívar Zapata (8 December 1994) Biotechnology
- Octavio Novaro (27 October 1995; † 6 March 2018) theoretical physicist; winner of the 1993 UNESCO Science Prize.
- Fernando del Paso (12 February 1996; † 14 November 2018) Literature
- Alejandro Rossi Guerrero (22 February 1996; † 5 June 2009) Philosophy
- Mario Lavista (14 October 1998; † 4 November 2021) Music
- Luis Felipe Rodríguez (24 February 2000) Radioastronomer

=== Members admitted in the 21st century ===
- Mario J. Molina (24 April 2003; † 7 October 2020), co-recipient of the 1995 Nobel Prize in Chemistry for elucidating the threat to the Earth's ozone layer by chlorofluorocarbon gases (CFCs).
- Enrique Krauze (27 April 2005), historian and cultural promoter, member of the board of Instituto Cervantes and the Mexican Academy of History.
- Eusebio Juaristi (13 February 2006), researcher on Physical chemistry, winner of the 1998 National Prize of Arts and Sciences.
- María Elena Medina-Mora Icaza (6 April 2006), researcher at the National Institute of Psychiatry, winner of the 1986 Gerardo Varela National Prize of Public Health.
- Diego Valadés Ríos (13 February 2007), former Attorney General and researcher at the National Autonomous University of Mexico (UNAM).
- Luis Fernando Lara (5 March 2007), linguist, member of UNESCO's Permanent International Committee of Linguists.
- Linda Rosa Manzanilla (9 April 2007), archaeologist specialized in domestic archaeology in early urban developments, first Mexican woman ever admitted to the United States National Academy of Sciences.
- Ranulfo Romo (9 March 2011), neuroscientist and researcher at the National Autonomous University of Mexico (UNAM).
- Jaime Urrutia Fucugauchi (4 February 2014), geophysicist, president of the Mexican Academy of Sciences, and researcher at the National Autonomous University of Mexico (UNAM).
- José Ramón Cossío Díaz (11 February 2014), lawyer and jurist, member of the Supreme Court of the Nation.
- Juan Villoro, (24 February 2014), author.
- Antonio Lazcano (6 October 2014), biologist specialized in the origins of life. Professor at the National Autonomous University of Mexico (UNAM).
- Javier Garciadiego (February 25, 2016), historian.
- Vicente Quirarte (March 3, 2016; † 11 August 2026), writer.
- Alejandro Frank Hoeflich (31 March 2016), physicist and researcher at the National Autonomous University of Mexico (UNAM).
- Concepción Company (February 23, 2017), linguist and philologist.
- José Antonio de la Peña (24 March 2017), mathematician.
- Julio Frenk (24 may 2017), public health scholar.
- Christopher Domínguez Michael (3 November 2017)), literary critic.
- Julia Carabias Lillo (27 August 2018), biologist and environmental conservationist.
- Susana Lizano (30 November 2018), astronomer.
- Leonardo López Luján (15 March 2019), archaeologist and director of the Templo Mayor Project (INAH).
- Claudio Lomnitz (5 March 2021), social anthropologist.
- Susana López Charretón (29 March 2021), virologist.
- Felipe Leal Fernández (26 April 2021), architect.
- Gabriela Ortiz (August 30, 2022), musician and composer.
- Carlos A. Coello Coello (5 May 2023), computer scientist.
- Cristina Rivera Garza (21 July 2023), writer.
- Silvia Giorguli Saucedo (10 February 2025), demographer.
- Carlos Alberto Aguilar Salinas (7 July 2025), endocrinologist and researcher.
- Alejandro González Iñárritu (26 de mayo de 2026), filmmaker.

=== Current members ===
This list includes the 37 members as of 2026.

- Carlos Alberto Aguilar Salinas
- Francisco Bolívar Zapata
- Julia Carabias Lillo
- Carlos A. Coello Coello
- Concepción Company
- José Ramón Cossío
- José Antonio de la Peña
- Christopher Domínguez Michael
- Alejandro Frank Hoeflich
- Julio Frenk
- Javier Garciadiego
- Silvia Giorguli Saucedo
- Alejandro González Iñárritu
- Eusebio Juaristi
- Enrique Krauze
- Antonio Lazcano Araujo
- Luis Fernando Lara
- Felipe Leal Fernández
- Susana Lizano
- Claudio Lomnitz
- Susana López Charretón
- Leonardo López Luján
- Linda Rosa Manzanilla
- Adolfo Martínez Palomo
- Eduardo Matos Moctezuma
- María Elena Medina-Mora
- Gabriela Ortiz
- Manuel Peimbert
- Cristina Rivera Garza
- Luis Felipe Rodríguez
- Ranulfo Romo
- Pablo Rudomin
- José Sarukhán
- Jaime Urrutia Fucugauchi
- Diego Valadés Ríos
- Juan Villoro
- Gabriel Zaid
