= Elsa Recillas =

Mexican astronomer

Elsa Recillas Pishmish (also published as Elsa Recillas-Cruz) is a Mexican astronomer whose research involves photometry of galaxies and their brightest stars, and of emission nebulae. She is a professor and researcher in the Mexican National Institute of Astrophysics, Optics and Electronics.

== Education ==
Recillas studied physics at the National Autonomous University of Mexico (UNAM), graduating in 1968, and went on to earn a master's degree in astronomy from the University of Sussex in England in 1971. She returned to UNAM for a second master's degree in physics in 1983 and a doctorate in 1988.

== Book ==
With her daughter Irene Cruz-González, Recillas is a coauthor of a book on Galileo, El hombre de la torre inclinada: Galileo Galilei (1st ed., Gatopardo, 1985).

== Personal life ==
Recillas comes from an astronomical and mathematical family. Her mother Paris Pişmiş was a noted Armenian-Mexican astronomer, and her father Félix Recillas Juárez was a mathematician. Her brother Sevín Recillas Pishmish also became a mathematician. Recillas married astronomer Carlos Cruz-González, and their daughter Irene Cruz-González also became an astronomer.

== Recognition ==
Recillas is a member of the Mexican Academy of Sciences.
