= Lourdes A. Vega Acosta Montalban =

Mexican rheologist

Lourdes Angélica Vega Acosta Montalban (also known as Lourdes de Vargas) is a retired Mexican rheologist who, in 1986, with José Manuel Tejero Andrade, cofounded the Laboratory of Rheology and Physics of Soft Matter at the Instituto Politécnico Nacional.

Vega Acosta Montalban earned her Ph.D. in 1979 at the University of Wisconsin–Madison with the dissertation In-line elasticity measurements in polymer melts. She is a member of the Mexican Academy of Sciences. She retired between 2006 and 2015.
