= Russian Mexicans =

Total population
- 1,606 Russian nationals residing in the country (2015) (Unknown as of 2019); Unknown number of Mexicans of Russian descent

Regions with significant populations
- Mexico City, Tijuana, Cancún

Languages
- Mexican Spanish, Russian

Religion
- Russian Orthodox, Molokans, and Judaism

Related ethnic groups
- Russians, Mennonites in Mexico

According to the 2000 Mexican census, 1,293 Russian citizens were resident in Mexico.

== Russian explorers in New Spain and independent Mexico ==
=== 16th and 17th centuries ===
- 1542–43: Juan Cabrillo visits San Diego, Farallon Islands, Cape Mendocino, Cape Blanco, Oregon.
- 1579–1639: Russian frontiersmen penetrate eastward to Siberia and the Pacific.
- 1602: S. Viscaino explores to the Columbia River region, naming the Farallon Islands, Point Reyes and the Rio Sebastian (present-day Russian River).

=== 18th century ===
- 1728: Vitus Bering and Alexei Chirikov explore Bering Strait.
- 1741–42: Bering and Chirikov claim Russian America (Alaska) for Russia.
- 1769: Gaspar de Portola traveling overland discovers San Francisco Bay.
- 1775: Juan Francisco de la Bodega y Quadra anchors in outer Bodega Bay, trades with the local Indians.
- 1784 — Russians Grigory Shelikov and his wife Natalia establish a base on Kodiak Island.
- 1799 — Russian American Company (with manager Aleksandr Baranov) establishes Novo Arkhangelsk (New Archangel, now Sitka, Alaska).

=== 19th century ===
- 1806 — Count Nikolai Rezanov, Imperial Ambassador to Japan and director of the Russian American Company, visits the Presidio of San Francisco.
- 1806–1813: American ships bring Russians and Alaska Natives on 12 California fur hunts.
- 1808–1811 — Ivan Kuskov lands in Bodega Bay (Port Rumiantsev), builds structures and hunts in the region.
- 1812 — March 15, Ivan Kuskov with 25 Russians and 80 Native Alaskans arrives at Port Rumiantsev and proceeds north to establish Fortress Ross.
- 1812 — September 11, The Fortress is dedicated on the name-day of Emperor Alexander I
- 1815 — First Russian migrant to California, José Antonio Bolcoff, arrives.
- 1816 — Russian exploring expedition led by Captain Otto von Kotzebue visits California with naturalists Adelbert von Chamisso, Johann Friedrich von Eschscholtz, and artist Louis Choris.
- 1817 — Chief Administrator Captain Leonty Gagemeister conducts treaty with local tribal chiefs for possession of property near Fortress Ross. First such treaty conducted with native peoples in California.
- 1818 — The Rumiantsev, first of four ships built at Fortress Ross. The Buldakov, Volga and Kiahtha follow, as well as several longboats.
- 1821 — Russian Imperial decree gives Native Alaskans and Creoles civil rights protected by law
- 1836 — Fr. Veniaminov (St. Innocent) visits Fort Ross, conducts services, and carries out census.
- 1841 — Rotchev sells Fort Ross and accompanying land to John Sutter.

== Migration history ==
After the anti-Jewish pogroms of 1881, Mexico frequently came under consideration as a possible refuge for Russian Jews seeking to emigrate. In June 1891, Jacob Schiff, an American Jewish businessman with railroad interests in Mexico, wrote to Ernest Cassel to enquire about the possibility for settlement of Russian Jews there. However, Russian Jews would not begin to arrive in significant quantities until the 1920s.

=== Pryguny in Baja California ===
From 1905 to 1906, about 50 families of Spiritual Christian Pryguny (colloquially known as Molokans), who arrived in Los Angeles from Russia, sought a rural location, and relocated to 13,000 acres (53 km^{2}) of land they had purchased in Guadalupe, Baja California in Mexico. Theirs would become the most successful Prygun colony cluster in North America. There, they build houses largely in the Russian style, but of adobe rather than wood, and grew a variety of cash crops including mostly wheat, alfalfa, grapes, and tomatoes. Their village was originally quite isolated, reflecting their desire to withdraw from society, but in 1958, road construction in the area resulted in an influx of Mexican and other settlers; some chose to flee encroaching urbanization, and returned to the United States. By the 1990s, only one family remained in the area.

== Notable Russian-Mexicans ==
=== Artist ===
- Arnold Belkin, Canadian-born Mexican painter to Russian Jewish father and English Jewish mother.
- Alberto Kalach, Mexican architect of Russian descent.
- Angelina Beloff, Russian-born Mexican artist.
- Olga Costa, German-born Mexican painter to Russian parents.
- Vlady Kibalchich Russakov, Russian Jewish-born Mexican painter.
- Mariana Yampolsky, American-born Mexican photographer to Russian Jewish father and German Jewish mother.

=== Entertainment ===
- Emmanuel Lubezki - Mexican cinematographer of Russian descent.
- Ilya Salkind - Mexican film and television producer of Russian descent.
- Noel Schajris, Argentine-born Mexican singer-songwriter and pianist of German, Ukrainian/Russian and Spanish descent.
- Fannie Kauffman, Canadian-born Mexican actress and comedian of German, Romanian and Russian descent.
- Kristoff Raczyñski, Russian-born Mexican actor, film producer, screenwriter and TV host of Polish origin.
- Elias Breeskin, Russian-born Mexican violinist, composer and conductor.
- Olga Breeskin, Mexican violinist, dancer and actress of Russian descent.
- Arcady Boytler, Russian-born Mexican producer, screenwriter, and director.
- Siouzana Melikián, Ukrainian-born Mexican actress of Russian and Armenian descent.
- Sergio Olhovich, Indonesian-born Mexican film director and screenwriter of Russian descent.
- Vladislav Badiarov, Russian-born Mexican violinist.
- Jacques Gelman, Russian-born Mexican film producer
- Ana Layevska, Ukrainian-born Mexican singer and actress of Russian origin.
- Valentín Pimstein, Chilean-born Mexican producer of telenovelas to Russian-Jewish parents.
- José Besprosvany, Mexican dancer, choreographer, director and teacher of Russian Jewish descent.
- Claudia Salinas, Mexican model, actress and former ballerina to Russian Ashkenazi mother.
- Philip Saltzman, Mexican-born American executive producer and television writer to Russian Jewish parents.

=== Literature ===
- Margo Glantz - Mexican writer, essayist, critic and academic, daughter of Ukrainian Jews immigrant.

=== Politics ===
- Senya Fleshin - Soviet Russian-born Mexican anarchist and photographer.
- Mollie Steimer - Russian-born Mexican anarchist.
- Leon Trotsky - Marxist revolutionary and theorist, Soviet politician, and the founder and first leader of the Red Army.
- Emilio Kosterlitzky- Russian born commander of the rurales during the late 19th century.

=== Science ===
- Marcos Moshinsky - Ukrainian-born Mexican physicist.
- Alexander Balankin, Russian-born Mexican scientist.
- Pablo Rudomín Zevnovaty, Mexican neuroscientist to Russian parents.
- Nora Volkow, Mexican-born American psychiatrist of Russian descent.
- Sara Topelson de Grinberg, Polish-born Mexican architect to Russian father and Polish mother.

== See also ==
- Mexico–Russia relations
- Leon Trotsky Museum, Mexico City
- Mexican Orthodox Apostolic Catholic Church
- White Mexicans

== Bibliography ==
- Krauze, Corinne Azen; Katz de Gugenheim, Ariela (1987). Los judíos en México: una historia con énfasis especial en el período de 1857 a 1930/The Jews in Mexico: a history with special emphasis on the period 1857 to 1930. Universidad Iberoamericana. ISBN 9789688590225.
- Hardwick, Susan Wiley (1993). Russian refuge: religion, migration, and settlement on the North American Pacific rim. Geography Research Paper Series. University of Chicago Press. ISBN 9780226316116.
