= Irene Cruz-González =

Mexican astronomer

Irene Cruz-González Espinosa (born 1953) is a Mexican astronomer whose research interests include the nuclear activity in galaxies, the observation of galaxies and their insterstellar medium, star formation, and optical and infrared telescope instrumentation. She is a researcher and professor in the Institute of Astronomy at the National Autonomous University of Mexico (UNAM).

== Education and career ==
Irene Cruz-González was born in 1953, in Mexico City,. She is the daughter of two artists, her father Carlos Cruz-González Aliphat was a landscape designer and her mother Rebeca Espinosa was an artist. Her brother Carlos Cruz-González was also an astronomer who died early in his research career. She is married to the mathematician Javier Bracho and has two sons Felipe and Adrian Bracho Cruz-González. She studied physics as an undergraduate at UNAM and worked on a BSc dissertation in astronomy supervised by Silvia Torres-Peimbert. Afterwards Irene Cruz-González went to Harvard University for graduate study in astronomy, earning a master's degree in 1979 under the supervision of Giovanni Fazio and a Ph.D. in 1984. Her doctoral dissertation, Continuum distributions of active galactic nuclei, was supervised by John Huchra.

She returned to Mexico and joined the UNAM Institute of Astronomy as a researcher in 1984.

== Book ==
With Abraham Nosnik and Elsa Recillas, Irene Cruz-González is a coauthor of a book on Galileo, El hombre de la torre inclinada: Galileo Galilei (1st ed., Gatopardo, 1985; edited also in Chile and Colombia).

== Recognition ==
Irene Cruz-González is a member of the Mexican Academy of Sciences. From 2010 to 2018 she was part of UNAM´s government board (Junta de Gobierno). UNAM gave her their National University Prize in 2002, and the Sor Juana Ines de la Cruz prize in 2006.
