= Mexico–Russia relations =

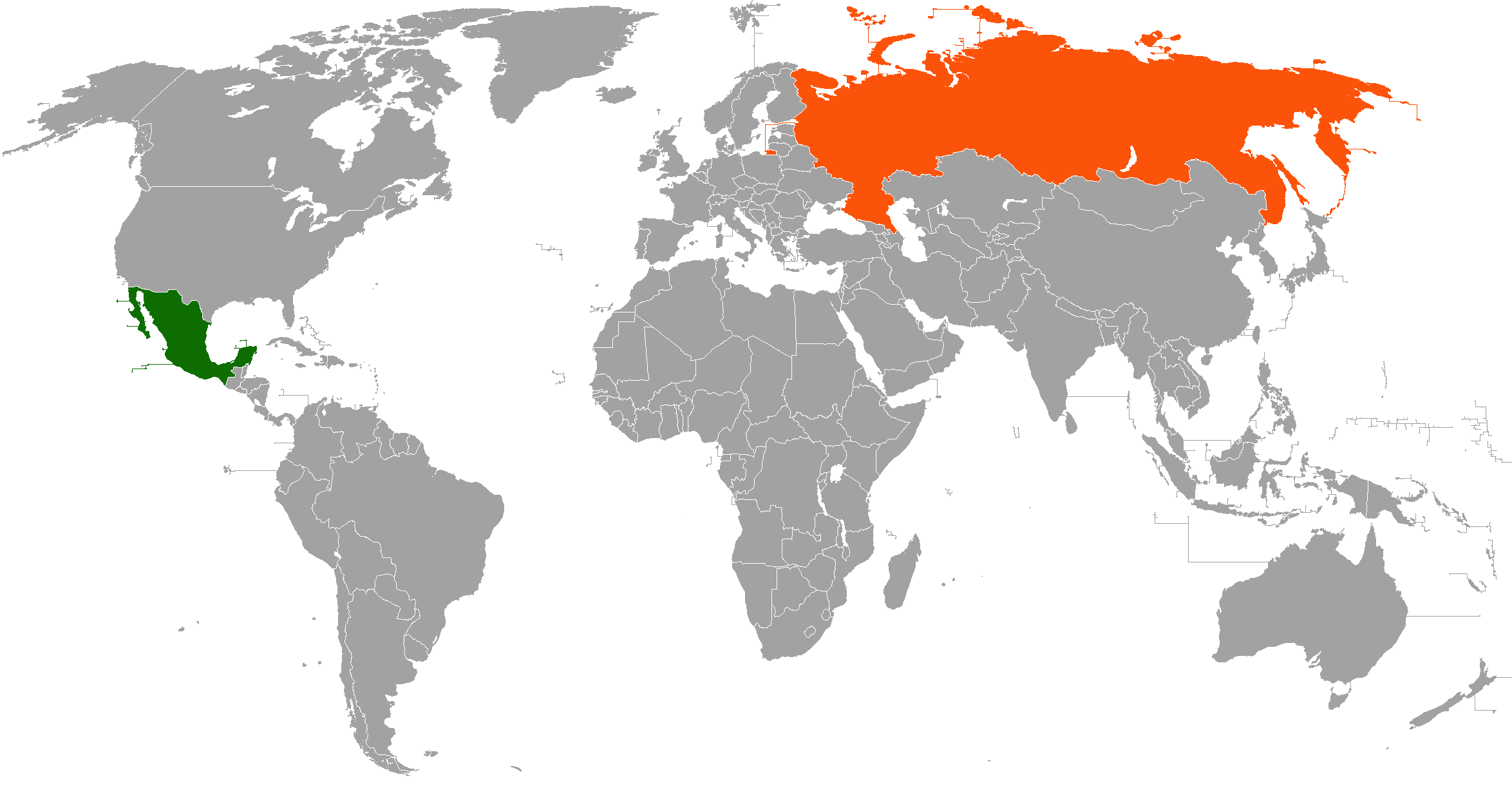

- Mexico: Russia

The nations Mexico and Russia initially established diplomatic relations in 1890. In 1924, Mexico recognized and established diplomatic relations with the Soviet Union. In 1930, Mexico broke diplomatic relations with the USSR and granted asylum to Leon Trotsky (who was later killed in Mexico City in 1940). In 1943, Mexico and the USSR re-established diplomatic relations. After the dissolution of the union, Mexico once again established diplomatic relations with the current Russian Federation in 1992.

Both nations are members of the Asia-Pacific Economic Cooperation, G-20 major economies and the United Nations.

== History ==
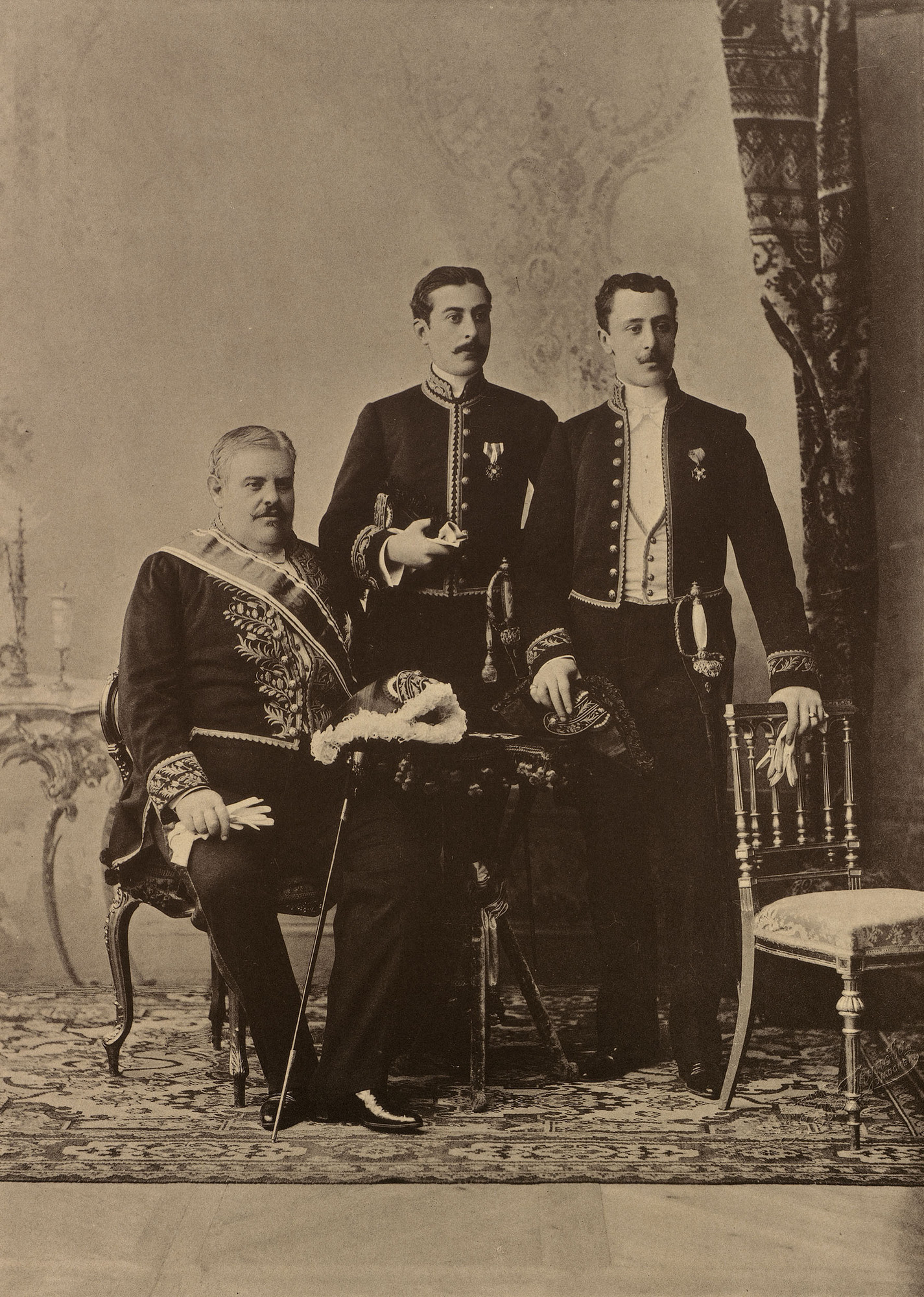
Diplomatic representatives of Mexico present at the coronation of Emperor Nicholas II of Russia; May 1896.

In 1806 the Russian Empire under Emperor Alexander I, began to expand its activities in Alaska (settled from the 1780s) and in California (then under control of the Spanish Empire). In 1806 the Russian diplomat and explorer Nikolai Rezanov arrived in California in order to secure food production for Russian fur-trade colonies. In 1812 the Russian-American Company established Fort Ross in present-day northern California.

In 1864, under Emperor Maximilian I, Mexico appointed a resident minister to the Russian court of Emperor Alexander II. Mexico and Russia formally established diplomatic relations on 1 December 1890 in Mexico City, with Baron Roman Rosen representing Emperor Alexander III of Russia. In 1891 the first Russian legation opened in the Mexican capital. During respective revolutions; 1910–1920 in Mexico and 1917 in Russia; diplomatic relations between the two countries were practically non-existent.

=== Soviet Union ===
In 1922, Russia became part of the Soviet Union. In August 1924, Mexico became the first country in the Americas to establish relations with the Soviet Union. In 1926, the Soviets appointed Alexandra Kollontai, the first female ambassador in the world, as their ambassador to Mexico.

On 26 January 1930, the two nations severed diplomatic relations because of "ideological differences". Mexico then began to take actions in contrast to Soviet opinion. In 1936 the former Soviet politician Leon Trotsky and his wife, Natalia Sedova, moved to Mexico from Norway during their exile. Mexican President Lázaro Cárdenas welcomed Trotsky warmly and even arranged for a special train to bring him to Mexico City from the port of Tampico. In Mexico, Trotsky once lived at the home of painters Diego Rivera and Frida Kahlo. In August 1940, an NKVD agent, Ramón Mercader, assassinated Trotsky in his study.

In 1939 during the Winter War, President Lázaro Cárdenas sent a message of solidarity to the Finnish people during their war with the Soviet Union. In May 1942, Mexico entered World War II by declaring war on the Axis powers and so became an ally of the Soviet Union. Diplomatic relations between the nations resumed in June 1943. In 1945 an airplane carrying the Soviet Ambassador in Mexico, Konstantin Umansky, crashed and killed the ambassador and other embassy officials. The loss of the Soviet ambassador caused a cooling in relations between both nations.

In 1973, Mexican President Luis Echeverría became the first Mexican head-of-state and the first non-communist Latin-American leader to visit the Soviet Union. In 1978, during an official visit by Mexican President José López Portillo to the Soviet Union, Mexico, on the behalf of Latin America and the Soviet Union, signed the Treaty of Tlatelolco which prohibits "testing, use, manufacture, production or acquisition by any means whatsoever of any nuclear weapons" in Latin America and the Caribbean.

Yuri Knorozov, a Soviet linguist, epigrapher and ethnographer, played an extremely important role in the decipherment of the Maya script, the writing system used by the pre-Columbian Maya civilization of Mesoamerica. Yuri was awarded the Order of the Aztec Eagle in 1994, the highest decoration awarded by Mexico to non-citizens, which was presented to him at a ceremony at the Mexican Embassy in Moscow.

=== Russian Federation ===
After the end of the Soviet Union in December 1991, Mexico continued to maintain diplomatic relations with the new Russian Federation as its successor state. Since then, bilateral relations between the two nations have steadily increased. Mexico has purchased various military equipment from Russia. The Mexican Navy has received BTR-60s Ural-4320, Mi-17/8s and 9K38 Igla anti-aircraft missiles. In 2001 and 2013, Russia launched Mexican communication satellites into space from the town of Baikonur, Kazakhstan, which is administered by Russia for space launch programs. In 2009, a joint Mexican-Russian Tatiana-2 mission was launched into space. Another joint satellite (Mijailo Lomonósov) between both nations will launch in the near future.

In 2014, during the annexation of Crimea by the Russian Federation, Mexico called for both sides seek dialogue and a peaceful resolution to the matter. The Mexican government also supported the request of the United Nations for the international community to "respect the unity and territorial integrity of Ukraine" and Mexico voted in favor of UN Resolution 68/262 recognizing Crimea as part of Ukraine.

In February 2020, Russian Foreign Minister Sergey Lavrov paid a visit to Mexico and met with his counterpart Marcelo Ebrard. Both foreign ministers discussed current relations between both nations and the celebration of 130 years of diplomatic relations between both nations. In April 2021, Foreign Secretary Marcelo Ebrard paid a visit to Russia with the objective of promoting bilateral cooperation and establishing priority lines of action in the short and long term and to discuss joint cooperation against COVID-19.

During the 2022 Russian invasion of Ukraine, Mexico condemned Russia's action and requested the respect for Ukraine's territorial integrity. Mexico also condemned Russia's action at the United Nations Security Council as a non-Permanent Member. On 1 March 2022, President Andrés Manuel López Obrador announced that Mexico would not be participating in any economic sanctions against Russia and criticized the overseas censorship of Russian state media. In September 2026, during the UN General Assembly, Mexico did not sign a peace petition for Russia to end its aggressions in Ukraine.

== High-level visits ==
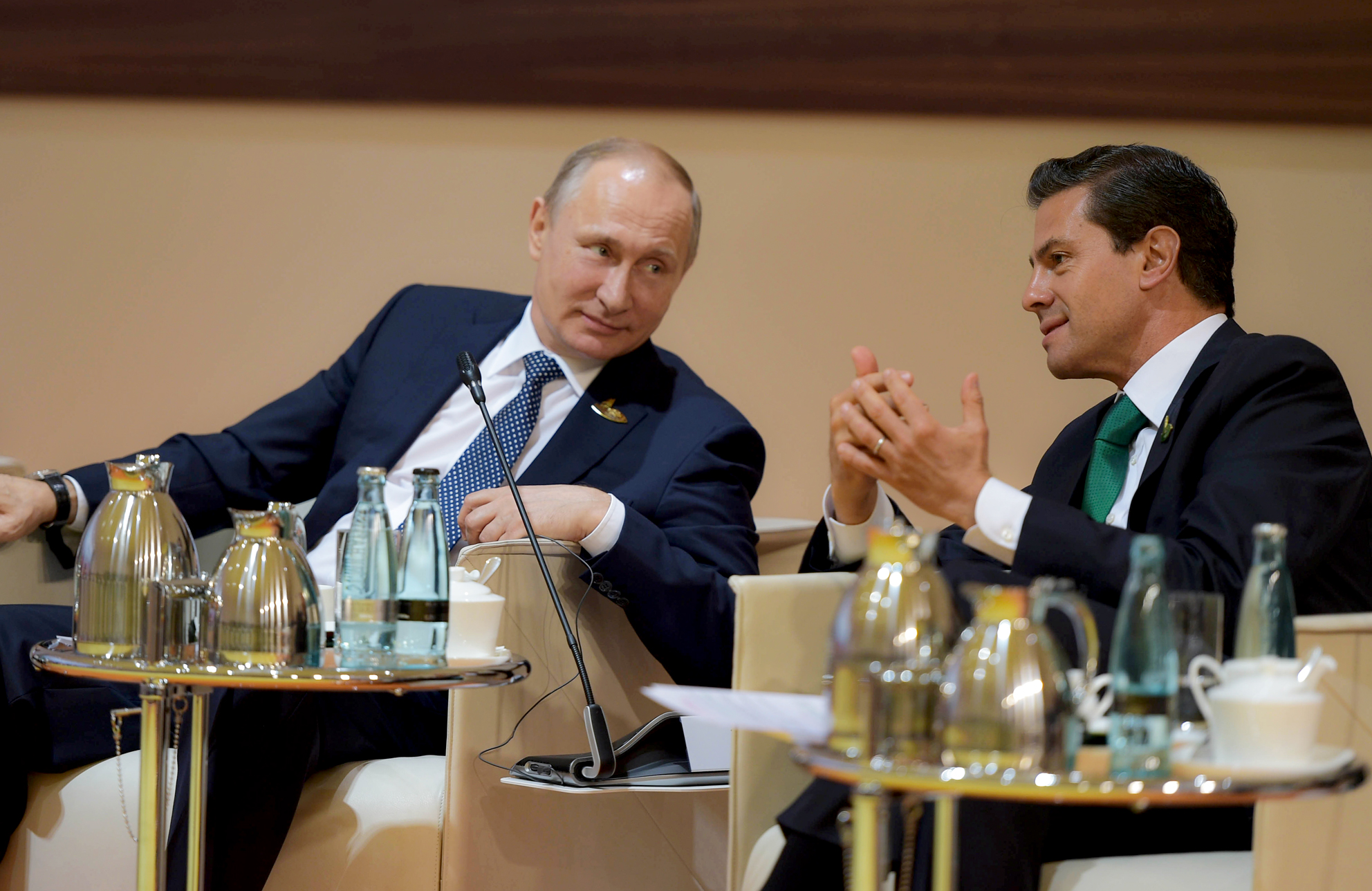
Mexican President Enrique Peña Nieto and Russian President Vladimir Putin meeting at the G-20 Summit in Hamburg, Germany; July 2017.

High-level visits from Mexico to the USSR / Russia

- Foreign Secretary Antonio Carrillo Flores (1968)
- President Luis Echeverría (1973)
- President José López Portillo (1978)
- President Carlos Salinas de Gortari (1991)
- Foreign Secretary José Ángel Gurría (1997)
- Foreign Secretary Rosario Green (2000)
- President Vicente Fox (2005)
- Foreign Secretary Patricia Espinosa (2008, 2011)
- President Felipe Calderón (2012)
- President Enrique Peña Nieto (2013)
- Foreign Secretary Luis Videgaray Caso (2017)
- Foreign Secretary Marcelo Ebrard (2021)

High-level visits from Russia to Mexico

- First Deputy Premier Anastas Mikoyan (1959)
- Foreign Minister Yevgeny Primakov (1996)
- President Vladimir Putin (2004, 2012)
- Foreign Minister Sergey Lavrov (2005, 2010, 2020)

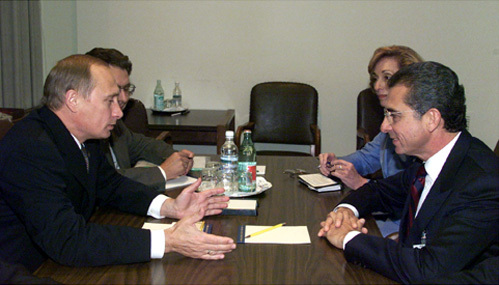
President Vladimir Putin and President Ernesto Zedillo in New York City; September 2000.

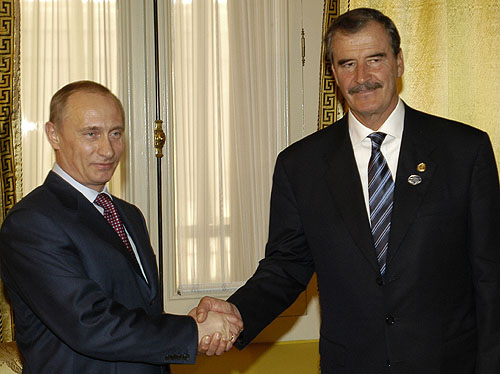
President Vladimir Putin and President Vicente Fox at the APEC summit in Santiago, Chile; November 2004.

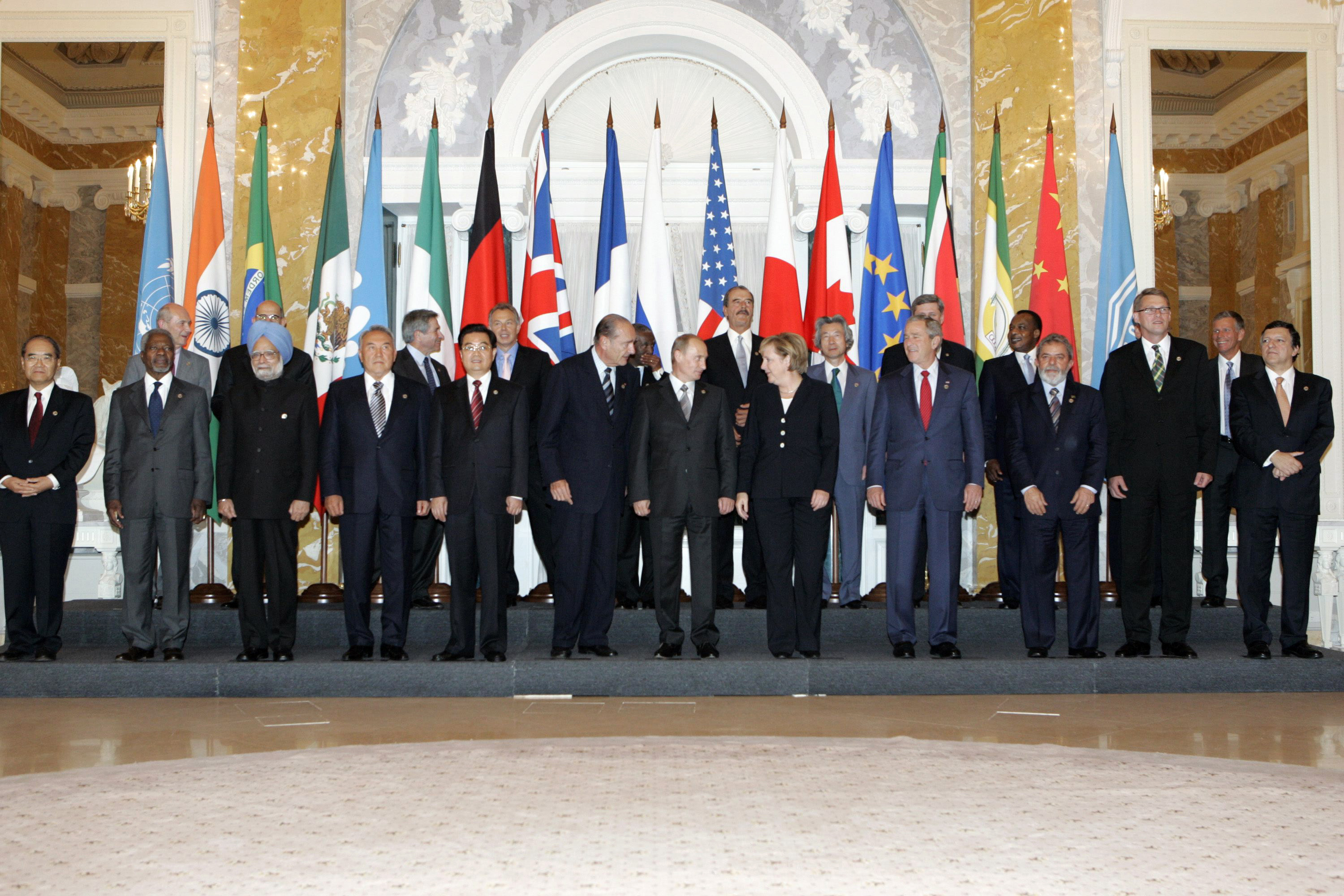
President Vladimir Putin and President Vicente Fox attending the G8 Summit in Saint Petersburg, Russia; July 2006.

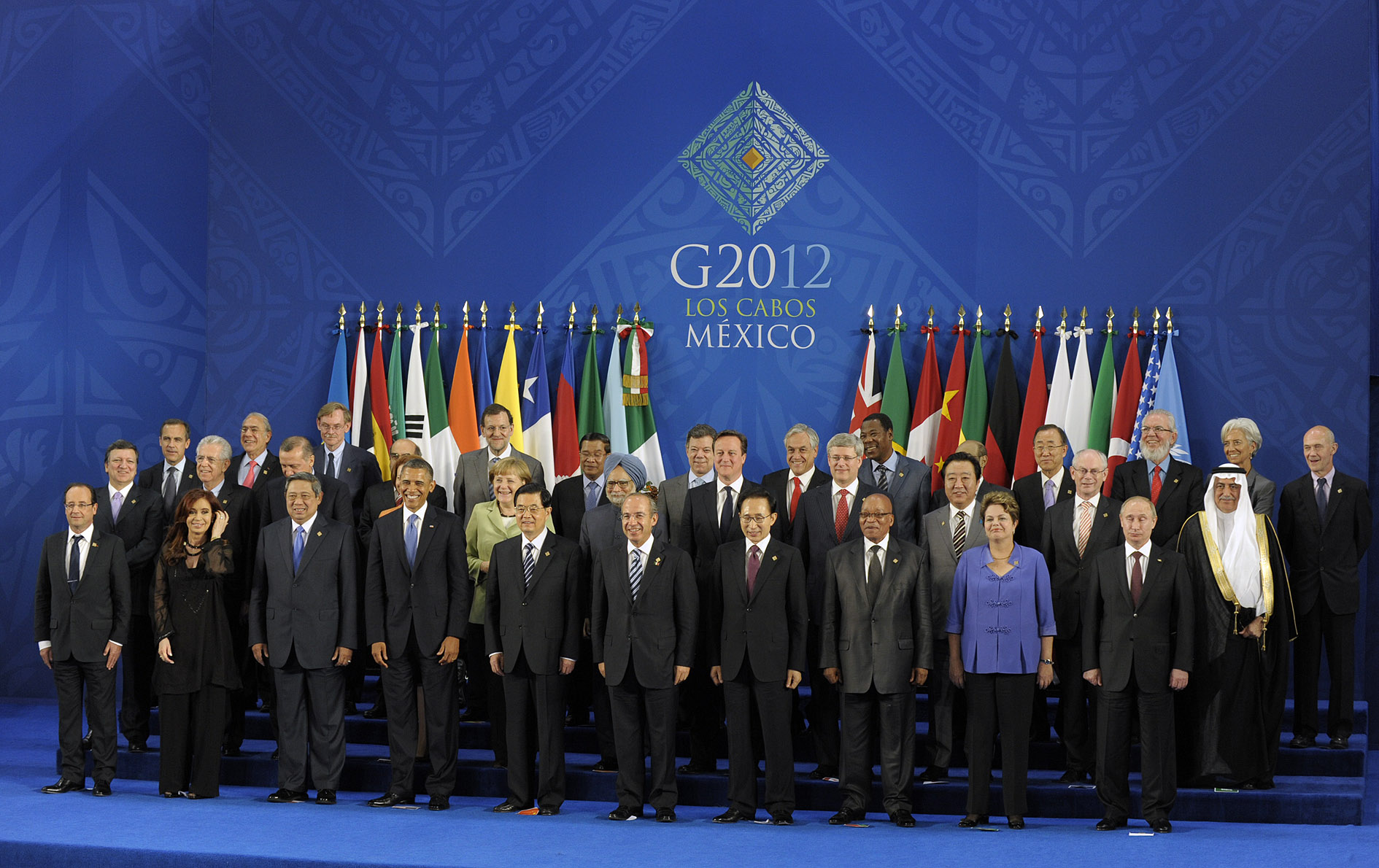
President Felipe Calderón and President Vladimir Putin attending the G20 conference in Los Cabos, Mexico; June 2012.

== Bilateral agreements ==
Both nations have signed several bilateral agreements such as an Agreement of Prohibition of Storing Nuclear Weapons in Mexico (and in Latin America) (1967); Trade Agreement and Protocol on Supplies of Machinery and Equipment (1973); Air Transportation Agreement (1976); Agreement on Economic and Technological Cooperation (1976); Consular Agreement (1978); Agreement on Maritime Transport (1978); Agreement of Scientific and Technical Cooperation (1996); Agreement of Cooperation in Combating Drug Trafficking and Drug Dependence (1996); Agreement of Cooperation in the areas of Culture, Education and Sports (1996); Touristic Cooperation (1997); Agreement on Cooperation and Mutual Customs Assistance (2003); Agreement to Avoid Double Taxation with respect to Income Taxes (2004); Treaty on the Transfer of Prisoners for the Execution of Criminal Sentences Depriving of Liberty (2004); Treaty on Reciprocal Legal Assistance in Criminal Matters (2005); Agreement on Cooperation in the peaceful uses of Nuclear Energy (2013) and a Memorandum of Understanding between both nations Foreign Diplomatic Institutions (2017).

== Trade ==
In 2023, two-way trade between both nations totaled US$2.4 billion. Mexico's main exports to Russia include: parts and accessories of motor vehicles, telephones and mobile phones, medical instruments and alcohol. Russian exports to Mexico include: products of iron or non-alloy steel, unwrought aluminum, minerals and wheat.

Russian multinational companies such as Gazprom, Kaspersky Lab, Lukoil and Power Machines (among others) operate in Mexico. Mexican multinational companies such as Binbit, Cemex, Gruma, Grupo Omnilife, KidZania and Mabe (among others) operate in Russia. Due to the Russo-Ukrainian War, companies such as Grupo Bimbo and Nemak have suspended operations in Russia for the time being.

== Resident diplomatic missions ==
- Mexico has an embassy in Moscow.
- Russia has an embassy in Mexico City.

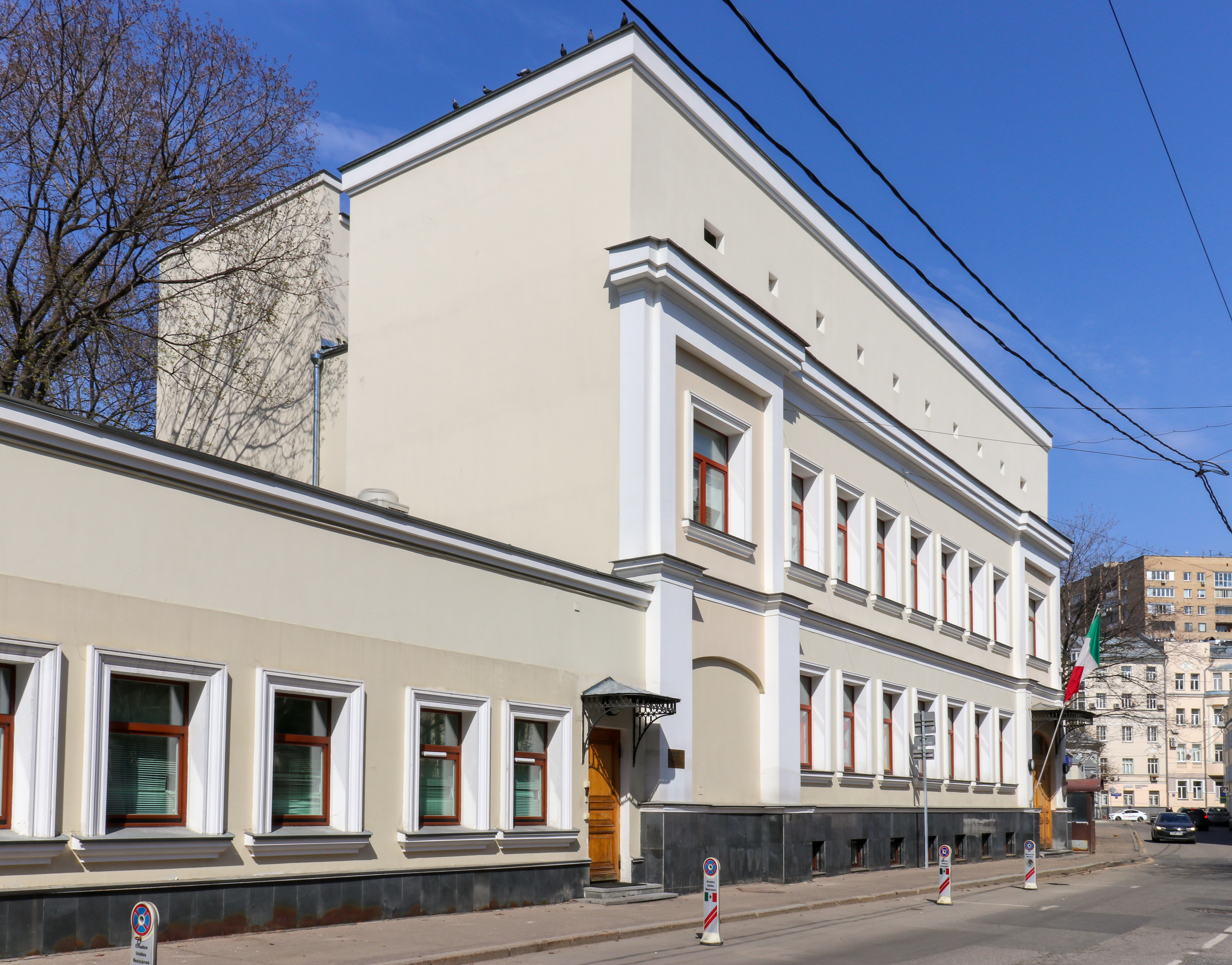
Embassy of Mexico in Moscow

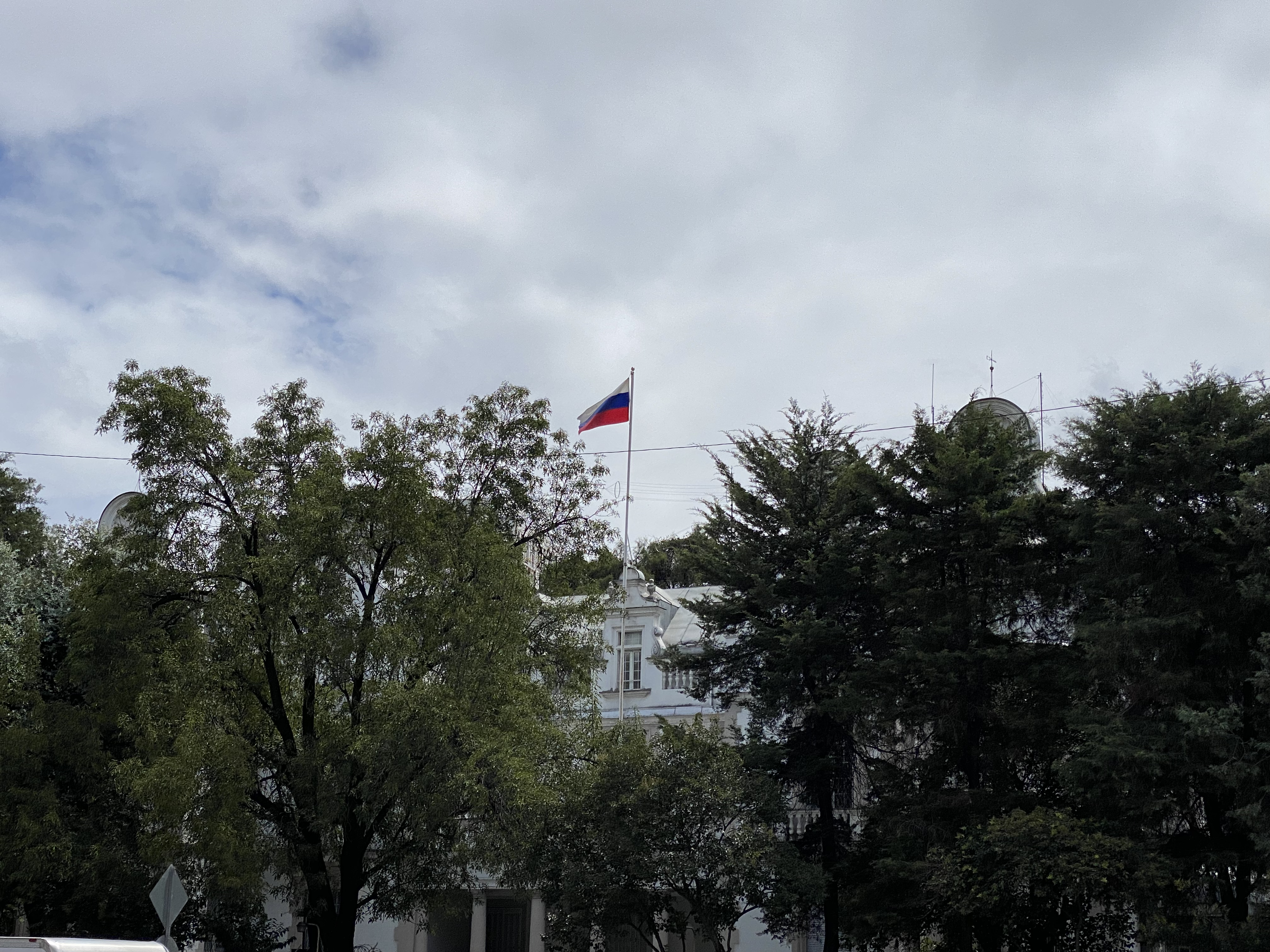
Embassy of Russia in Mexico City

== Gallery ==
Stamp commemorating 60 years of diplomatic relations between the Soviet Union and Mexico

Memorial to Leon Trotsky in Mexico City

Russian stamp of Mexico's Chapultepec Castle

Bust of Russian poet Alexander Pushkin in Mexico City

== See also ==
- Russian Mexicans
- List of ambassadors of Russia to Mexico
