= Susana Lizano =

Mexican astrophysicist and researcher

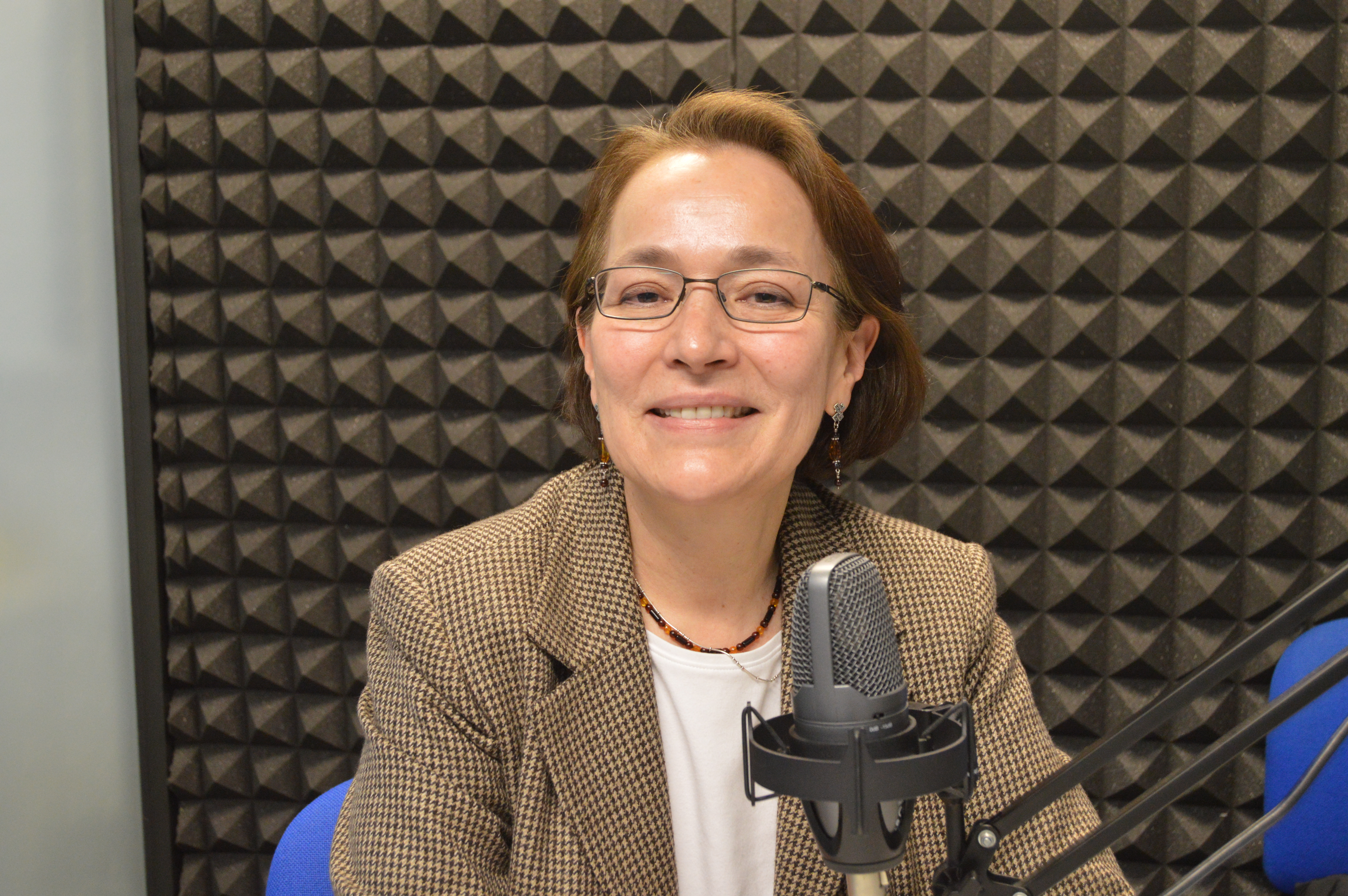
- Born: Estela Susana Lizano Soberón; March 29, 1957 (age 69); Mexico City, Mexico
- Education: UNAM; UC Berkeley
- Awards: Guggenheim Fellowship (1998–1999); National Prize for Arts and Sciences (2012)
- Scientific career
- Fields: Astrophysics
- Institutions: UNAM; Universidad Michoacana de San Nicolás de Hidalgo
- Thesis: Ambipolar diffusion and core formation in molecular clouds (1988)
- Doctoral advisor: Frank Shu

Estela Susana Lizano Soberón (born March 29, 1957) is a Mexican astrophysicist and researcher. She has specialized in the theoretical study of star formation.

== Studies and teaching ==
Lizano earned a degree in physics at the School of Sciences of the National Autonomous University of Mexico (UNAM). In 1984 she obtained a master's degree, and in 1988 a doctorate in astronomy at the University of California, Berkeley, supervised by Frank Shu. From 1990 to 1991 she did postdoctoral work at the Arcetri Astrophysical Observatory.

She has held the chair of Astronomy, Physics, and Mathematics at UNAM, and at the Universidad Michoacana de San Nicolás de Hidalgo, directing several doctoral and undergraduate theses.

== Research and academics ==
Upon her return to Mexico, Lizano joined the UNAM Institute of Astronomy, and in 1986 she moved to UNAM's Morelia Campus, participating in the creation of the Radio Astronomy and Physics Center (Centro de Radioastronomía y Astrofísica; CRyA), of which she was academic secretary from 2003 to 2007. She was appointed director of the CRyA for the terms 2007–2011 and 2011–2015.

Lizano is a Level III researcher of the Sistema Nacional de Investigadores. From 1997 to 2003 she participated with the Stellar Training Working Group, and from 2003 to 2009 with the Organizing Committee of the Interstellar Environment Division of the International Astronomical Union. From 2002 to 2004 she was a counselor of the American Astronomical Society. She is a member of the Mexican Academy of Sciences and the Mexican Physics Society.

== Publications ==
Lizano has written popular articles and chapters of books. Her research work has been cited more than 5,500 times. Some titles include:

- "Formation of stars in molecular clouds" in Formación estelar of UNAM and the Fondo de Cultura Económica in 1996
- "Astronomy in Mexico in the 21st Century" in the Estado actual y prospectiva de la ciencia en México of the Mexican Academy of Sciences in 2003
- "The Formation of Stars and Planets" in Siete problemas de la astronomía contemporánea of the National College in 2004
- "How are the Stars Formed?" in Aportaciones científicas y humanísticas en el siglo XX of the Mexican Academy of Sciences in 2008

== Awards and distinctions ==
- Mary Elizabeth Uhl Research Award from the Department of Astronomy of the University of California at Berkeley in 1986
- Scientific Research Award in the area of Exact Sciences from the Mexican Academy of Sciences in 1996
- National University Distinction for Young Academics in the area of Exact Sciences Research from UNAM in 1996
- Guggenheim Fellowship granted by the John Simon Guggenheim Memorial Foundation in 1998–1999
- Award for Scientific Research from the Mexican Society of Physics in 2001
- Award for Scientific and Humanistic Research from the Michoacán State Council of Science and Technology in 2006
- Marcos Moshinsky Medal from the UNAM Institute of Physics in 2010
- National Prize for Arts and Sciences in the area of Physical-Mathematical and Natural Sciences granted by the Secretariat of Public Education in 2012.
