= Antonio Lazcano =

Mexican biology researcher and professor

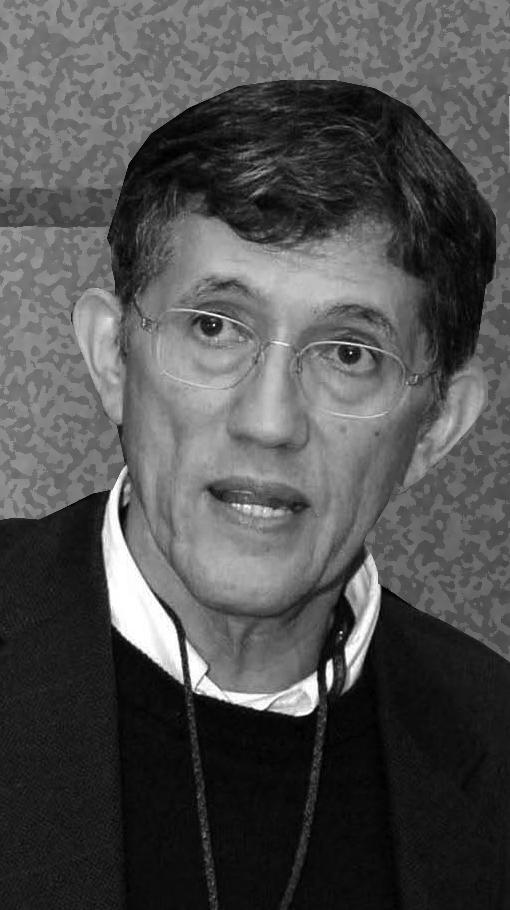
- Born: 1950 (age 75–76); Tijuana, Baja California, Mexico
- Education: National Autonomous University of Mexico (BS, PhD)
- Known for: Contributions to the theories of the origin of life
- Awards: Fellow of the National College (2014)
- Scientific career
- Fields: Evolutionary biology, science communication
- Workplaces: National Autonomous University of Mexico

Antonio Eusebio Lazcano Araujo Reyes (born 1950) is a Mexican biology researcher and professor of the School of Sciences at the National Autonomous University of Mexico in Mexico City. He has studied the origin and early evolution of life for more than 35 years.

Lazcano pursued his undergraduate and graduate studies focused on the study of prebiotic evolution and the emergence of life. He has been professor-in-residence or visiting scientist in France, Spain, Cuba, Switzerland, Russia, and the United States. He has written several books in Spanish, including The Origin of Life (1984) which became a best-seller with more than 600,000 sold copies.In addition, he has been a member of several advisoryand review boards of scientific organizations, such as NASA, where he was a member of the NASA Astrobiology Institute

He served as president of the International Society for the Study of the Origin of Life, for two terms, and is also the first Latin American scientist to occupy this position. A great honor, for Alexander Oparin, Stanley L. Miller and J. William Schopf, were also presidents of ISSOL.

Lazcano has devoted considerable efforts to promote scientific journalism and teaching. He also promotes the study of evolutionary biology and the origins of life, all over the world.

== Bibliography ==
- Lazcano Araujo, Antonio, El origen del nucleocitoplasma. Breve historia de una hipótesis cambiante, incluido en Una revolución en la evolución (A revolution in evolution), Universitat València, 2003, ISBN 978-84-370-5494-0
- Lazcano Araujo, A. (1988). La bacteria prodigiosa. Colección Biblioteca Joven. 91 pp. México: Fondo de Cultura Económica.
- Lazcano Araujo, A. (2008). Alexander I. Oparin: La chispa de la vida/The Spark of Life. 112 pp. México: Pax México. ISBN 968-860-886-6, 9789688608869
- Lazcano Araujo, A. (1983). El origen de la vida: evolución química y evolución biológica. 2a. ed., 107 pp., reimpr. México: Trillas ISBN 968-24-1313-3, 9789682413131
