= Juan Pedro Laclette =

Mexican biologist (born 1953)

Juan Pedro Laclette San Román
- Born: February 17, 1953 (age 73); Celaya, Guanajuato, Mexico
- Education: UNAM; CINVESTAV (IPN)
- Known for: Research on human and porcine cysticercosis
- Awards: President, Mexican Academy of Sciences (2006–2008); Coordinator General, Foro Consultivo Científico y Tecnológico (2008–2012); Co-chair, Inter-American Network of Academies of Sciences (2007–2012)
- Scientific career
- Fields: Biology, Parasitology
- Workplaces: UNAM; CINVESTAV

Juan Pedro Laclette San Román (born 17 February 1953) is a Mexican biologist and researcher at the UNAM.

== Biography ==
He holds a doctorate in Biomedical Research from UNAM and a Master of Science degree in biochemistry from CINVESTAV, part of the IPN. His main area of specialization is research on human and porcine cysticercosis.

He completed a two-year postdoctoral fellowship as a Visiting Scientist at the School of Public Health of Harvard University. He began teaching at UNAM's Faculty of Medicine in 1974, first as a teaching assistant in biochemistry and later as a lecturer. In 1981, he joined the Institute of Biomedical Research at UNAM as an associate researcher. He served as head of the Department of Immunology from 1991 to 1995 and later as director of the institute (1999–2007). Since 2000, he has been a senior researcher (level C), and since 1999 has held PRIDE level D. He has been part of the National System of Researchers since its founding in 1984, and a level III researcher since 2003. As of October 2015, he had 41 years of service at UNAM.

His academic and administrative career also includes two terms as coordinator of the Graduate Program in Biomedical Sciences (1996–1998 and 1998–1999), appointed by rectors José Sarukhán Kermez and Francisco Barnés de Castro. He was vice president of the Mexican Academy of Sciences (2004–2006) and later its president (2006–2008). He was elected coordinator general of the Foro Consultivo Científico y Tecnológico (2008–2012) and served two terms. He was also co-president of the Inter-American Network of Academies of Sciences (IANAS) from 2007 to 2012, and president of the Mexican Society of Parasitology (2003–2005).

He has served as an ex officio member of the governing board of the National Institute of Pediatrics (Ministry of Health) and of the governing board of CONACYT. In February 2014, he was appointed by UNAM rector José Ramón Narro Robles as coordinator of graduate studies at UNAM.

In 2012, he was listed among the 300 most influential leaders in Mexico by Líderes Mexicanos magazine.

He has published four books and numerous scientific articles in medical research journals. A member of several academic societies, he has taught undergraduate and doctoral courses at UNAM.
