= Rubén Bonifaz Nuño =

Mexican poet and scholar (1923–2013)

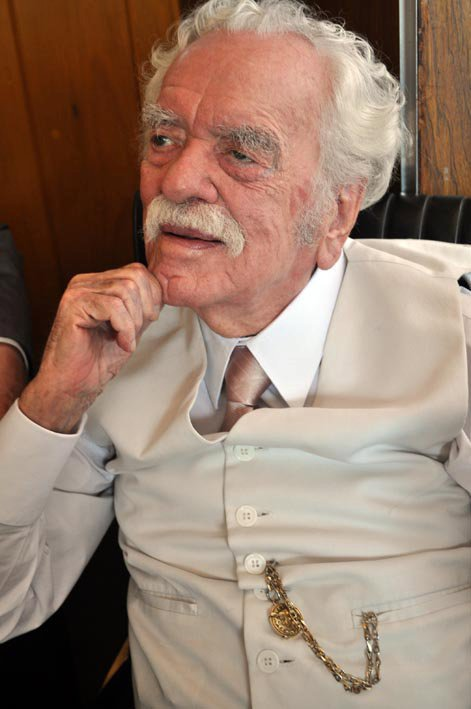
- Rubén Bonifaz in 2011
- Born: 12 November 1923
- Died: 31 January 201
- Occupations: Poet, academic
- Writing career
- Notable awards: National Prize for Arts and Sciences (1974)

Rubén Bonifaz Nuño (12 November 1923 – 31 January 2013) was a Mexican poet and classical scholar.

Born in Córdoba, Veracruz, he studied law at the National Autonomous University of Mexico (UNAM) from 1934 to 1947. In 1960, he began lecturing in Latin at the UNAM's Faculty of Philosophy and Literature and received a doctorate in classics in 1970. Among his publications are translations of works by Catullus, Propertius, Ovid, Lucretius and others into Spanish; his translation of Vergil's Aeneid (1972–73) was particularly well received.

He was a member of the Mexican Academy of Language since 1963 and was admitted to the Colegio Nacional in 1972. In 1974 he was awarded the National Prize for Arts and Sciences in the Linguistics and literature category.

== Selected works ==
- El Ala del Tigre, Fondo de Cultura Económica (1969) ISBN 968-16-2182-4
- Del Templo de Su Cuerpo, Fondo de Cultura Económica (1993) ISBN 968-16-3927-8
- De Otro Modo, lo Mismo, Fondo de Cultura Económica (1996) ISBN 968-16-0313-3
- Fuego de Pobres, Fondo de Cultura Económica (2000) ISBN 968-16-8153-3
- Los Demonios y los Días, Fondo de Cultura Económica (2010) ISBN 968-16-8170-3
- El Honor del Peligro, Valparaíso (2013) ISBN 84-940009-7-7
