= Pablo Rudomín Zevnovaty =

Mexican biologist, physiologist and neuroscientist (born 1934)

Pablo Rudomín Zevnovaty (born June 5, 1934) is a Russian-Mexican biologist, physiologist and neuroscientist. He is regarded as one of the most prestigious neurophysiologists in the international community. His studies have been fundamentally directed to the analysis of mechanisms of the central control of the information transmitted by the sensory fibers in the spinal cord, and of how these are modified during central and peripheral injuries, as well as during processes of acute inflammation.

== Career and education ==
He is a graduate of the Biology program of the National School of Biological Sciences of the National Polytechnic Institute. He has been the director of the program of neuroscience at the Center for Research and Advanced Studies of the NPI since 1984. At the neuroscience program, his research has focused on the analysis of the central nervous system control mechanisms for the transmission of information that is conveyed by nerve fibers originating in the skin and muscles to the lumbosacral spinal cord.

He has also been a guest researcher at the following centers:

- Rockefeller Institute for Medical Research – New York City, US (1959–1960)
- Institute of Medical Pathology – Siena, Italy (1960–1961)
- Marine Biology Laboratory – Woods Hole, Massachusetts, US (1960)
- National Institutes of Health – Bethesda, Maryland, US (1968–1969, 1984–1986 and 1990–1991)
- University of Gothenburg – Gothenburg, Sweden (1983)

He has also held honorary positions:

- President of the Mexican Academy of Sciences
- Vice-president of the Mexican Society of Physiological Sciences
- General coordinator of the Presidential Science Advisory Council.
- Counseling member of the CONACYT.

He has been professor since 1961 and from 1993 he is member of El Colegio Nacional.

== Awards ==
- National Alfonso Caso Science Award from the Mexican Academy of Sciences
- National Science Award;
- Award for the Best Paper of the Mexican Academy of Sciences;
- Prince of Asturias Award (1987);
- Luis Elizondo Award of the ITESM
- Lázaro Cárdenas Award.
- Dr Honoris Causa, University of Puebla, Mexico
- Dr Honoris Causa, Universidad Autónoma de Nuevo León (UANL), Mexico
- Dr Honoris Causa, Universidad Nacional Autónoma de México, Mexico (2011)
