= José Ramón Cossío =

Mexican jurist

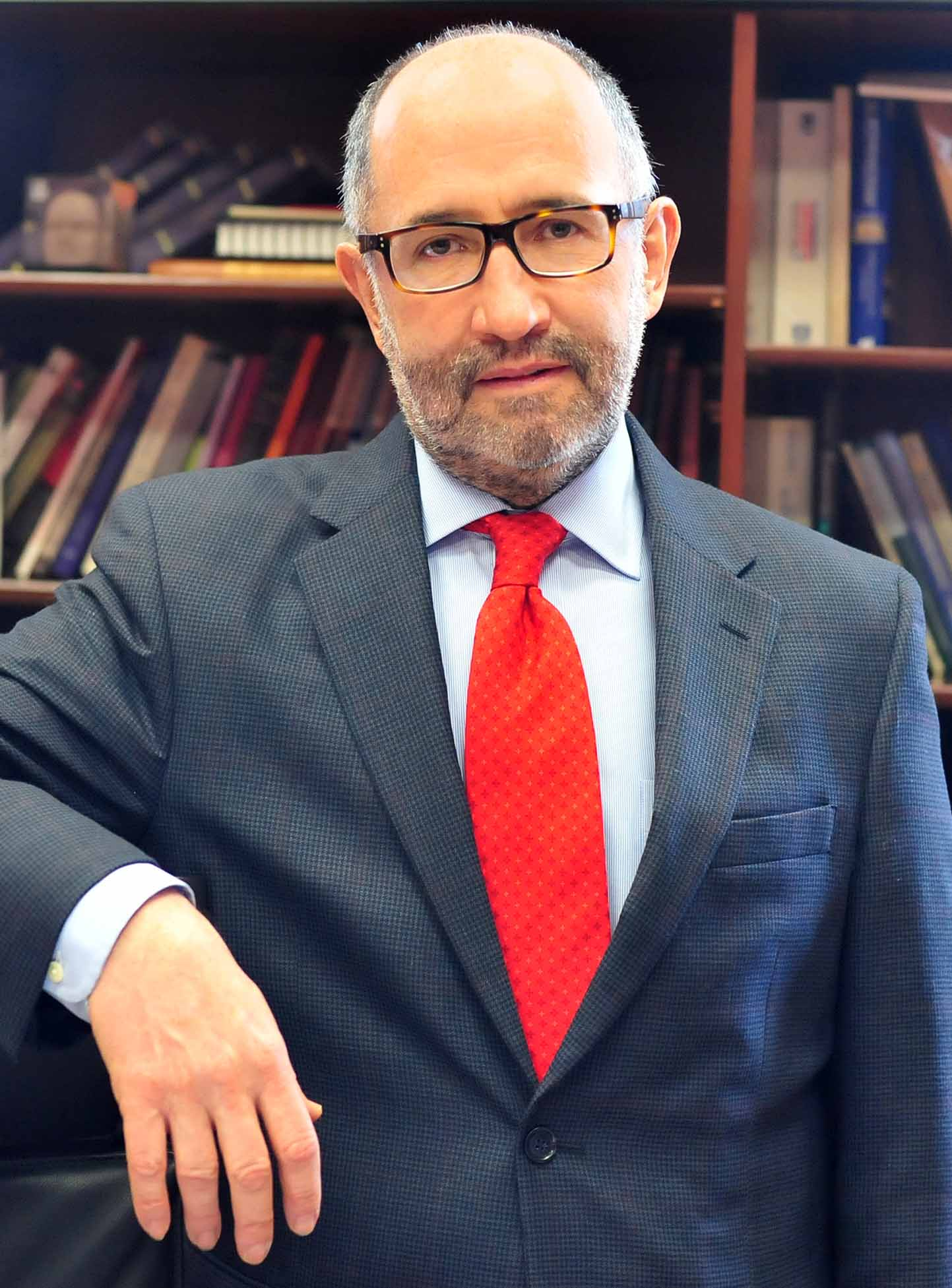
Portrait of José Ramón Cossío

José Ramón Cossío Díaz (born 26 December 1960) is a Mexican jurist and Associate Justice (ministro) of the Supreme Court of Justice of the Nation.

Born in Mexico City, Cossío Díaz studied law at the University of Colima and a master's and doctorate (summa cum laude) at the Universidad Complutense in Madrid. He has taught constitutional law at the Instituto Tecnológico Autónomo de México, where he was also director of the law faculty.

He was nominated for the Supreme Court by President Vicente Fox, and confirmed by the Senate, in 2003, one of the youngest justices in the Court's history.
