= Silvia Torres-Peimbert =

Mexican astronomer

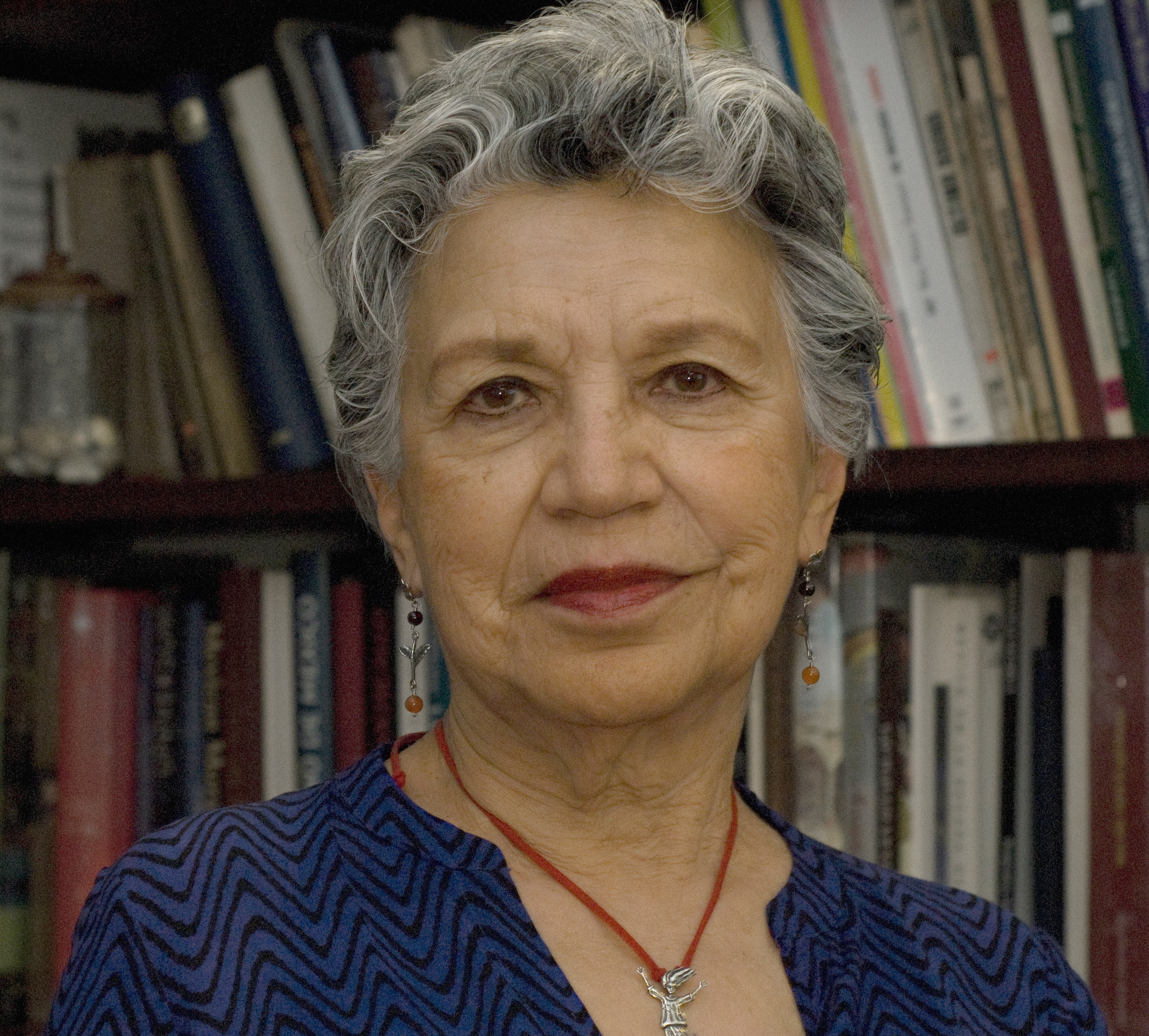
- Torres-Peimbert in July 2015
- Born: 1940 (age 85–86); Mexico City, Mexico
- Occupation: Astrophysicist
- Employer(s): Universidad Nacional Autónoma de México, UNAM
- Spouse: Manuel Peimbert
- Awards: Hans A. Bethe Prize (2012)

Silvia Torres-Peimbert (also known as Silvia Linda Torres Castilleja, born in 1940) is a Mexican astronomer. She won the L'Oréal-UNESCO Awards for Women in Science in 2011 for Latin America for her work determining the chemical composition of nebulae.

== Life ==
Torres-Peimbert was born in Mexico City in 1940. She studied Physics at the National Autonomous University of Mexico (UNAM) before going to the University of California, Berkeley. She returned to Mexico to conduct post-doctoral research at her alma mater. She studied star formation and the mass thrown out by mid-size stars. She has studied the distribution of the primordial helium abundance. In 1973 she became a professor in the Faculty of Sciences and the Institute of Astronomy at UNAM and was the director of Institute of Astronomy from 1998 to 2002. During this time she worked closely with Manuel Peimbert, her husband. Torres-Peimbert and Peimbert had both been students of Guillermo Haro (Haro was in 1959 the first person elected to the Royal Astronomical Society from a developing country).

Torres-Peimbert was the editor of Revista Mexicana de Astronomía y Astrofísica from 1974 to 1998

Torres-Peimbert was named President of the International Astronomical Union for the 2015-2018 period, becoming the second woman to preside over the IAU.

== Recognition ==
Torres-Peimbert is a member of the Mexican Academy of Sciences, and a member of the American Astronomical Society and the Academy of Sciences of the Developing World.

She won the L'Oréal-UNESCO Awards for Women in Science in 2011 for Latin America. The award is given annually to leading women scientists with an award being given to five continents. She won the award for investigating the "chemical composition of nebulae" which the organisers considered essential to our understanding of the beginning of the cosmos. She also won the Hans A. Bethe Prize in 2012 for her work in determining the quantities of helium and other elements during the development of the universe. Knowing about these elements allows cosmologists to understand the evolution of stars and galaxies.
