= Vladislav Badiarov =

- Born: 1973; Nalchik, Russia, RSFSR, USSR
- Occupation: Violinist
- Instrument: Violin

Vladislav Badiarov (Russian:Владислав Львович Бадьяров, born in Nalchik, Russia) is a Russian-Mexican violinist. His brother is the baroque violist and violon maker Dmitry Badiarov. He appeared at Festival Cervantino, in Guanajuato.
