= Arcadio Poveda =

Mexican astronomer (1930–2022)

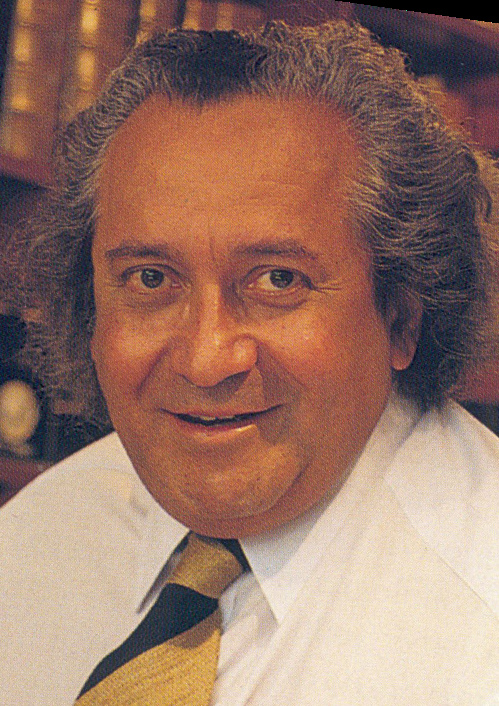
- Arcadio Poveda, in 2010
- Born: 15 July 1930; Mérida, Yucatán, México
- Died: 24 March 2022 (aged 91); Mexico City, Mexico
- Education: University of California, Berkeley
- Known for: Poveda's formula
- Awards: National Prize for Arts and Science (Mexico, 1975)
- Scientific career
- Fields: Astronomy
- Workplaces: National Autonomous University of Mexico

Renán Arcadio Poveda Ricalde (15 July 1930 – 24 March 2022) was a Mexican prominent astronomer who developed a method to calculate the mass of elliptical galaxies. He received Mexico's National Prize for Arts and Sciences in 1975, chaired its National Astronomical Observatory from 1968 to 1980 and was elected to The National College in 1989.

Poveda was born in Mérida, Yucatán. He initially enrolled at the National Autonomous University of Mexico but ended up graduating with both a Bachelor of Arts degree (1953) and a PhD in Astronomy (1956) from the University of California, Berkeley. Afterward, he moved back to Mexico and enrolled at the Institute of Astronomy of the National Autonomous University, where he has worked as a researcher since 1956. As a visiting scholar, he has lectured at the Institute of Astrophysics in France (CNRS, 1963), Columbia University (1967), Kitt Peak National Observatory (1981–82, 1983–84), and at the University of California, San Diego (1982–83).

A public planetarium in his native Mérida, is named in his honor.
