= Francisco Bolívar Zapata =

Mexican biochemist

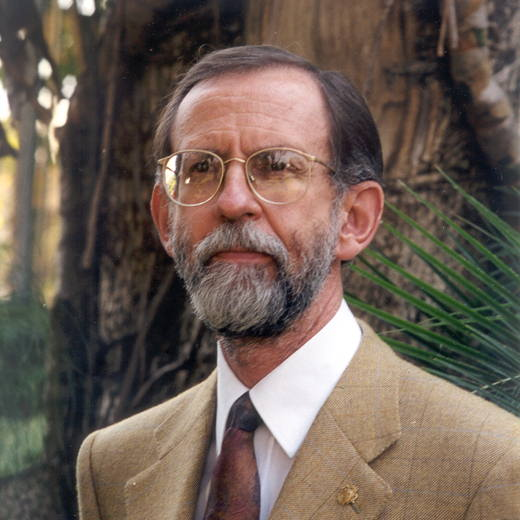
Portrait of Francisco Bolívar Zapata

Francisco Gonzalo Bolívar Zapata (born 7 March 1948) is a Mexican biochemist and professor.

After getting his PhD in biochemistry by the National Autonomous University of Mexico (UNAM), he joined the Research Center for Genetic Engineering and Biotechnology (now known as the Institute of Biotechnology) in the same university, undertaking studies on Molecular Biology and Biotechnology and becoming one of the most important researchers working in the development of techniques for the use and characterization of the cell genetic material.

His studies have significantly contributed the design, construction and characterization of molecular vehicles for the transfer and expression of DNA (Deoxyribonucleic acid). In 1977 he worked in the production of human proteins like insulin and somatostatin in bacteria using genetic engineering techniques.

Francisco Bolívar Zapata has been member of several expert committees in the UNESCO and the WHO, and has published over a hundred articles and books. He is member of the UNAM's Board of Directors and The National College. He received the Prince of Asturias Award in 1991 and the TWAS Prize in 1997.

In September 2012, he was appointed to the presidential transition team of Enrique Peña Nieto to be responsible for science, innovation, and technology. This was accompanied by a presidential pledge to invest 1% of GNP to these fields, following the recently passed law on science and technology.
