= Revista Mexicana de Astronomía y Astrofísica =

- Discipline: Astronomy
- Language: English
- Edited by: Christine Allen

Publication details
- History: 1974–present
- Publisher: Instituto de Astronomía (Mexico)
- Frequency: Biannual
- License: Yes

Standard abbreviations
- ISO 4: Rev. Mex. Astron. Astrofís.

Indexing
- ISSN: 0185-1101

Links
- Journal homepage

The Revista Mexicana de Astronomía y Astrofísica (often RevMexAA or RMxAA) is a peer-reviewed scientific journal of astronomy founded in 1974. It is a successor to the Boletín de los Observatorios de Tonantzintla y Tacubaya which was published from 1952 to 1972.

It is published by the Astronomical Institute (Instituto de Astronomia) of the National Autonomous University of Mexico. It publishes two issues every year. For the first twenty years it also included, as separate volumes, proceedings of astronomical conferences in Mexico and Latin America, where 13 reports of meetings were produced. In 1995 it was decided to create a new publication dedicated to this purpose, the Revista Mexicana de Astronomía y Astrofísica, Serie de Conferencias (or RMxAC).

Much information on the history of RmxAA was published in 2011, and previous information in other bibliometric articles.

It is considered one of the scientific journal in Latin America with the highest impact factor.

== Revista Mexicana de Astronomía y Astrofísica, Serie de Conferencias ==
The conference series was created in 1995 as a vehicle to publish proceedings of meetings in astronomy and closely related fields. So far 46 proceedings of meetings have been published as part of this series. Altogether the series has included 13 Latin American Regional IAU Meetings (LARIM), 6 Texas-Mexico Conferences on Astrophysics, and several selected topics of interest to the community. The meetings have taken place in Mexico, Chile, Brazil, Venezuela, Uruguay, Argentina, Spain and the US.

== Editors ==
The following astronomers have been editors of the RMxAA:

- E. E. Mendoza V., P. Pishmish & S. Torres-Peimbert (1974–1976)
- C. Cruz-Gonzalez, E. Mendoza V., P. Pishmish (1976–1977)
- C. Firmani, P. Pishmish & S. Torres-Peimbert (1978–1979)
- P. Pishmish, L. F. Rodriguez & S. Torres-Peimbert (1980–1983)
- P. Pishmish, & S. Torres-Peimbert (1983–1998)
- J. Cantó & L. F. Rodriguez (1999–2001)
- C. Allen (2002– )

And the editors of RMxAC have been:

- P. Pishmish, & S. Torres-Peimbert (1995–1998)
- J. Cantó & L. F. Rodriguez (1999–2001)
- C. Allen (2002)
- S. Torres-Peimbert (2001-)
