= Manuel Peimbert =

Mexican physicist

Manuel Peimbert Sierra (born June 9, 1941) is a Mexican astronomer and a faculty member at the National Autonomous University of Mexico (UNAM). He was named a foreign associate of the National Academy of Sciences in 1987.

== Biography ==
Peimbert was born in 1941 in Mexico City. In his first year of college at UNAM, Peimbert went to the Tonantzintla Observatory in Puebla with a friend, Gerardo Bátiz, and they told the observatory director, Guillermo Haro, that they wanted to help at the observatory. Haro put them to work with a Schmidt camera, and Peimbert and Bátiz found several planetary nebulae, ten of which had never been described. They were later named the Peimbert-Bátiz nebulae, and subsequent study with astronomer Rafael Costero identified fourteen more.

After earning an undergraduate physics degree from UNAM, Peimbert completed a doctorate at the University of California, Berkeley before returning to UNAM as a faculty member. He works at the UNAM Institute of Astronomy. From 1982 to 1988, Peimbert was vice president of the International Astronomical Union.

In 1987, Peimbert was elected a foreign associate of the National Academy of Sciences. He was inducted into the Colegio Nacional in Mexico in 1993. Peimbert was named a fellow of the Third World Academy of Sciences, and he was awarded one of the three TWAS Medal Lectures the first year they were held (1996). He received the Hans Bethe Prize from the American Physical Society in 2012. Peimbert and his wife, fellow UNAM faculty member Silvia Torres-Peimbert, were the first non-U.S. scientists to win the Hans Bethe Prize. Peimbert was elected an international member of the American Philosophical Society in 2002.

Peimbert is the great-grandson of writer Justo Sierra.
