= Mexican Academy of Sciences =

Academy of sciences

Coordinates: 19.2434°N 99.1758°W

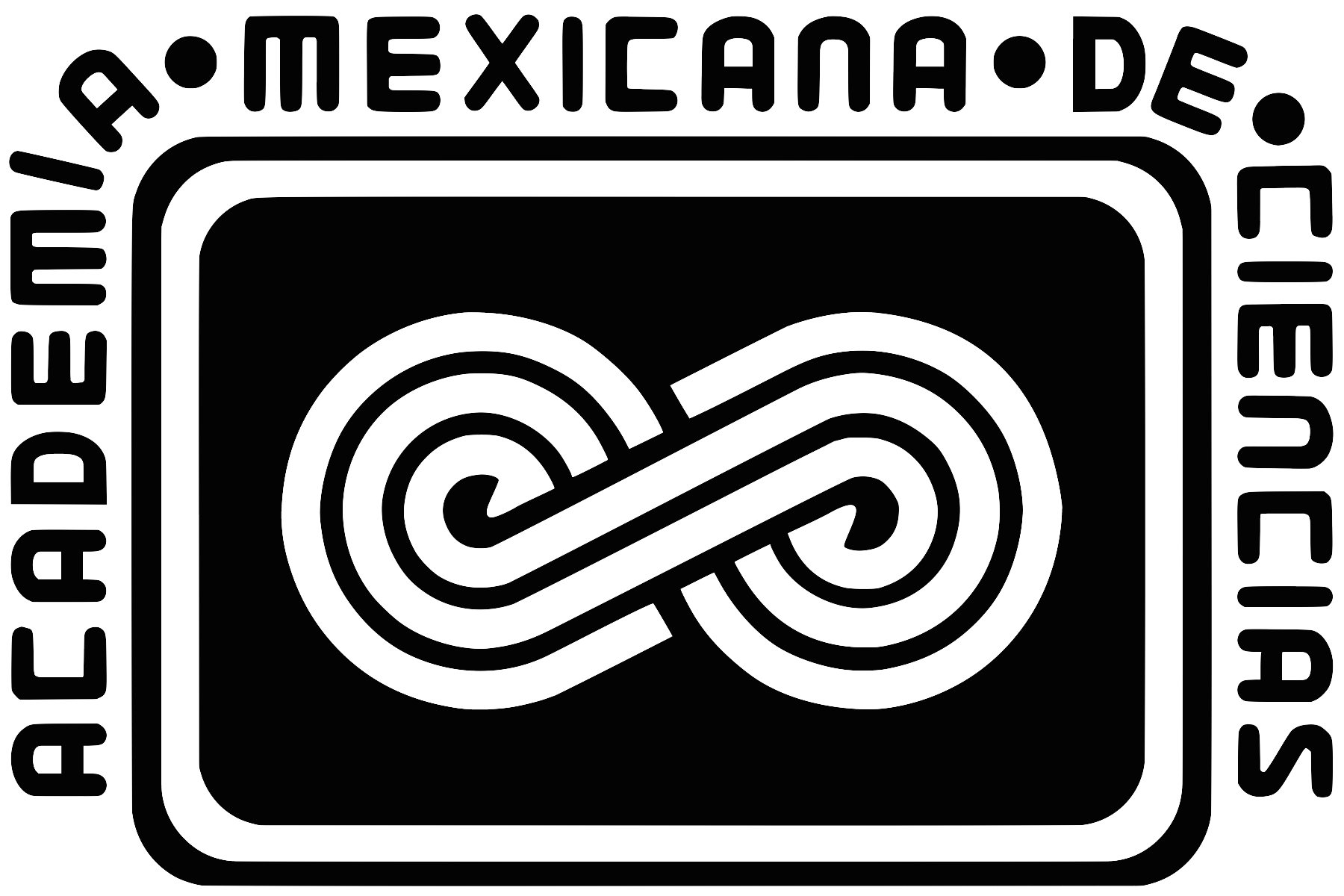
Mexican Academy of Sciences
Details
Foundation	12 August 1959
Location	Mexico City, Mexico
Members	2,708 (2017)
President	José Luis Morán López
Address; Casa Central	Casa Tlalpan; Mexico City, Mexico
Web page	http://www.amc.mx

The Mexican Academy of Sciences (Academia Mexicana de Ciencias) is a non-profit organization comprising over 1800 Mexican scientists, attached to various institutions in the country, as well as a number of foreign colleagues, including various Nobel Prize winners.

== Principles and mission ==
- To maintain its independent status
- To serve as a spokesman for the scientific community with society and the Mexican state
- To advocate quality, professionalism and honesty in scientific research, training and dissemination
- To foster the development and consolidation of the Mexican scientific community
- To ensure that the aim of the production, implementation and dissemination of scientific knowledge is always to develop the creative and intellectual capacities of individuals and society

== Objectives ==
- To group together the most outstanding researchers in Mexico in the various areas of science and to promote public recognition of their work
- To encourage scientific research, training and dissemination in Mexico
- To advocate the fullest utilization of Mexican researchers' production
- To seek national and international recognition of Mexican scientists
- To promote and direct exchange with scientific organizations and communities in other countries

== Executive Board of Directors ==
According to AMC's statutes, the Directive Council is responsible for supervising and managing all the Academia's affairs, and implementing the decisions made at the Ordinary and Extraordinary General Assemblies. It consists of a president, a vice-president, two secretaries (one appointed by the incoming president and another by vote), and a treasurer who will serve on the board for two years. The vice-president will occupy the post of president during the following period.

== Membership ==
To date, the Academia has a total of 1,847 researchers, working mostly in Mexico and occasionally abroad, who are affiliated to various institutions. These members are grouped, according to their specialty, in one of ten existing academic sections: agricultural sciences, astronomy, biology, social sciences and humanities, physics, geosciences, engineering, mathematics, medicine and chemistry. Each section has a coordinator responsible for liaising between members of the Academia and the Board of Directors. The Academia also has corresponding members in various countries, active researchers who have been recognized in their disciplines and made a significant contribution to the development of research in Mexico. At present there are 58 corresponding members, including nine Nobel Prize winners. The Academia has also expanded geographically to reinforce the work undertaken by its members at the country's academic centers. In 1993, the Central Regional Section, comprising the states of Aguascalientes, Guanajuato, Michoacán, San Luis Potosí and Querétaro was established. The year 2000 saw the creation of Regional Centers in the Southeast (Campeche, Chiapas, Quintana Roo, Tabasco and Yucatán, known as Southeast 1), the Northwest (Baja California Sur, Baja California, Chihuahua, Sinaloa and Sonora), and the Northeast (Coahuila, Durango, Nuevo León and Tamaulipas). The Southeast II Regional Section (Guerrero, Oaxaca, Puebla and Veracruz) was created in the year 2001.

A total of 85% of the 1,847 members of AMC belong to the National System of Researchers (NSR), 14% of whom are Emeritus or Level III members.

Area/Section	Men	Women	Total
Exact Sciences	779	128	907
Astronomy	34	11	45
Physics	317	33	350
Engineering	150	10	160
Mathematics	90	6	96
Chemistry	116	43	159
Geosciences	72	25	97
Natural Sciences	478	137	615
Agro-sciences	87	14	101
Biology	240	87	327
Medicine	151	36	187
Social Sciences and Humanities	196	129	325
Total	1453	394	1847

=== Ex-presidents ===
Name	Period
Jaime Urrutia Fucugauchi	2014-2017
José Franco López	2013-2014
Arturo Menchaca Rocha	2010-2012
Rosaura Ruiz Gutiérrez	2008-2009
Juan Pedro Laclette San Román	2006-2007
Octavio Paredes López	2004-2005
José Antonio de la Peña Mena	2002–2003
René Raúl Drucker Colín	2000–2001
Francisco Bolívar Zapata	1998–1999
Juan Ramón de la Fuente Ramírez	1996–1997
Mauricio Fortes Besprosvani	1994–1995
Antonio Peña Díaz	1992–1993
Hugo Aréchiga Urtuzuástegui	1990–1991
Fernando del Río Haza	1988–1989
Adolfo Martínez Palomo	1985–1987
José Sarukhán Kermez	1983 – 198
Pablo Rudomín Zevnovaty	1981–1983
Daniel Reséndiz Núñez	1979–1981
Guillermo Carvajal Sandoval	1977–1979
Jorge Flores Valdés	1976–1977
Agustín Ayala Castañares	1975–1976
Carlos Gual Castro	1974–1975
Alonso Fernández González	1973–1974
José Luis Mateos Gómez	1972–1973
Raúl Ondarza Vidaurreta	1971–1972
Ismael Herrera Revilla	1970–1971
Fernando Alba Andrade	1967–1968
Guillermo Soberón Acevedo	1966 – 196
Marcos Mazari Menzer	1965–1966
Marcos Moshinsky Borodiansky	1962–1963
Alberto Sandoval Landazuri	1959–1960

== Standing commissions ==
=== Membership ===
The Membership Commission, led by the vice-president of AMC, is composed of ten researchers from the areas of exact, natural and social sciences, each of whom occupies this post for four years. Every two years, half of the Commission's members, who have held the post for four years, are replaced by new members, elected by members' vote. Every year, this Commission analyzes all candidates seeking election as regular or corresponding members.

=== Awards ===
The Awards Commission, also led by the vice-president of AMC and divided into five areas: Exact Sciences, Social Sciences, Humanities, Natural Sciences and Engineering and Technology, analyzes and determines the recipients of the various awards granted annually by AMC. Every year, half the Commission's members, who have held the post for two years, are replaced by new members, elected by members' vote.

=== Awards and incentives ===
During the academic year, the Academia offers the following awards:

- AMC Research Awards

Instituted in 1961 and regarded as the highest distinction conferred by AMC, this award is offered to young researchers under the age of 40 undertaking state-of-the-art research in the areas of exact, natural and social sciences, humanities and engineering and technology.

Since 1961, AMC has given research awards to 159 scientists from over 20 institutions.

- Weizmann and Weizmann-Kahn Awards

Since 1986, the Academia, in conjunction with the Asociación Mexicana de Amigos del Instituto Weizmann de Ciencias, has granted Weizmann Awards to the best doctoral dissertations produced in Mexico by researchers under the age of thirty-five in the areas of exact and natural sciences. Likewise, since 2001, the Weizmann-Kahn Award has been granted to the best doctoral dissertations in engineering and technology.

- Social Sciences and Humanities Award

Since 1996, the Academia has granted this award to the best doctoral dissertations in social sciences undertaken in Mexico by researchers under the age of 40.

== Academic programs ==
AMC's activities are oriented towards developing and consolidating scientific culture by strengthening the values of creative intellect so that society regards them as its own. As a result of the above, several AMC programs are designed to promote science among young people, foster the training of new researchers, enhance communication and collaboration with institutions responsible for research in Mexico and raise the Academia's international profile.

- Science at Your School

Created in 2002, this program seeks to raise the level of mathematics and science teaching using alternative methods to those employed in traditional teaching that will stimulate the interest of children and youth through greater interaction with teachers and their involvement in simple, direct experimental practices that will engage their curiosity and encourage more dynamic learning. Specific actions have been implemented to train teachers and provide them with useful teaching tools. These actions have included diploma courses for teachers, designing special materials, providing special support for teachers, working in the classrooms, offering series of conferences and creating a web site.

- Computers for Children and Youth

Since 1987, the purpose of this program has been to support the teaching of computer use through workshops aimed at primary school children. The workshops are held in various Mexican public libraries throughout the country and in the metropolitan area. In 2004, these workshops were attended by 37,228 children at 111 libraries in 12 Mexican states as well as in the Federal District. Secondary school students are given a workshop to improve their grasp of mathematics, based on the program The Geometer's Sketchpad.

- Mathematics Teaching Program

Created in 1999, this program seeks to undertake activities to support mathematics teaching. It has focused on the production of teaching material to be used in projects to disseminate the free Computer Program for children and youth. It also undertakes studies on the problems that affect the formal teaching of mathematics in elementary and middle school. Some examples of math teaching can be seen at www.puemac.matem.unam.mx

- Scientific Research Summer

The Scientific Research Summer was created in 1990. The Summer is a short period of residence (June–August) for university students wishing to pursue a scientific career at Mexico's most prestigious research centers and laboratories. In 2004, applications were received from 1,739 undergraduate students, 690 of whom were awarded grants. The program also received the support of 459 researchers at 135 receiving institutions.

- Scientific Research Week

The Week consists of planning the greatest number of talks on scientific topics, aimed at young university and senior high school students throughout the country. In recent years, summer weeks have been held at fourteen institutions in twelve states with the participation of over 670 internal and 29 external speakers.

- Nobel Conferences

Designed to promote an annual visit by Nobel Prize winners in order for them to interact with Mexican researchers and graduate students, this program has been operating since 1995. Eleven Nobel Prize winners have visited the Academia to date.

- Visits from Distinguished Professors

In 1996, AMC, together with the United States-Mexico Science Foundation inaugurated this program aimed at promoting visits to Mexico by well-known researchers living in the United States to undertake academic work such as seminars, short courses and workshops, and to engage in new research collaborations with Mexican scientists. On average, fifteen of these professors visit various Mexican institutions every year. Between 1996 and 2004, 155 visits by distinguished professors to various research institutes in Mexico were approved.

== Promotion and dissemination of science ==
The Academia has created several programs for promoting science to stimulate interest in scientific disciplines among Mexican children and youth.

- Science on Sundays

This program, created in 1982, consists of popular science talks for the general public, given by distinguished scientists. These talks are generally scheduled at week-ends.

In 2004, the program celebrated its 22nd anniversary. For an uninterrupted period of 22 years, the Science on Sundays program has operated at 149 venues at which 5,348 lectures have been given. In 2004, 391 talks were delivered at 16 sites distributed throughout 10 Mexican states and the Federal District. The program currently operates at 16 venues.

- Science Olympiads

The original aim of this program, initiated in 1991, was the organization of four nationwide competitions in the areas of mathematics, physics, chemistry and biology, for pre-university students. In each area, the competitions are composed of three stages; state, national and training and selection of the delegations that will represent Mexico at international competitions. The Academia also organizes five competitions: the National Chemistry Olympiad the National Biology Olympiad, the Spring Mathematics Competitions for students ages 13 to 15, the Funny Mathematics Competition for students under 12 and the Mexican Geography Olympiad.

- National Chemistry Olympiad

The Academia Mexicana de Ciencias, in conjunction with the Asociación Mexicana de Química Analítica, the Academia Mexicana de Química Inorgánica and the Sociedad Química de México organize the National Chemistry Olympiad. Approximately 8,000 students participate in this competition nationwide, every year. Within the national and Latin American sphere, nine gold medals, 21 silver, 27 bronze medals and eight honorable mentions were obtained between 1994 and 2004.

- National Biology Olympiad

Since 1999, AMC has participated in the International Biology Olympiad. Six bronze and one silver medals have been obtained to date. Approximately 7,000 participate nationwide every year.

- Spring Mathematics Competition

AMC annually invites applications for this competition, created in 1996 and consisting of two levels, one for children under thirteen, the other for teenagers under the age of fifteen. The winners participate in the May Olympiad, an international competition carried out simultaneously in Spanish- and Portuguese-speaking countries. The winners of this competition then participate in the River Plate Olympiad, held in Buenos Aires, Argentina. Between 1996 and 2004, nine gold medals, 28 silver medals, 86 bronze medals and 37 honorable mentions were obtained. In 2004, 200,824 students participated nationwide.

- Funny Mathematics Competition

The Funny Mathematics Competition, created in 1998, is aimed at children under the age of 12. The winners also participate in international competitions, particularly the one held every summer in Hong Kong. In 2004, 81,474 children participated nationwide.

- Mexican Geography Olympiad

The Mexican Geography Olympiad was first held in 2003. It is organized in conjunction with Fundación Televisa and National Geographic en Español. The competition is aimed at students under the age of 17 most of whom are at secondary school. Over 100,000 students participate nationwide every year, with the winners representing Mexico at the World Geography Championship organized by the National Geographic Society.

== Special committees ==
AMC has special committees for issues of national importance. These committees engage in studies that utilize the academics' specialized knowledge and the multi-disciplinary nature of the Academia to analyze the state of the art of various issues, by comparing the national situation with that of other countries as well as making recommendations to help government authorities in their decision-making. To date, special committees have been established on Water, Biotechnology, and Steam Cells and Cloning.

== Communication and Dissemination ==
AMC has a Communication and Dissemination Department that promotes activities, announcements, awards and meetings through press conferences, the written press and radio.

- News Web Site

The News Page provides information on the activities of AMC and similar institutions as well as useful data on science and technology for the Mexican media.

- Ciencia Journal

Founded over 50 years ago, Ciencia is a quarterly review with a print run of 6,000 aimed at members of the scientific community, higher education and research institutes and all professionals wishing to keep abreast of scientific advances, scientific planning and policy and human resource training.

- Publications

To date, the Academia has published over 50 publications including studies and projects on various topics.

== Collaboration with national organizations ==
AMC maintains crucial links with various government organizations, by actively participating in the discussion, evaluation and organization of major national forums. Likewise, the Academia serves as a consultant for the Congress of the Union, particular the Science and Technology Commissions of the Chambers and Deputies and Senators. It also collaborates closely with other equally important organizations including the following:

- National Council of Science and Technology
- Ministry of Public Education
- Scientific and Technological Advisory Forum
- National Autonomous University of Mexico
- Metropolitan Autonomous University
- Center of Research and Advanced Studies
- National Polytechnic Institute
- Scientific Advisory Board for the President's Office

== Collaboration with international organizations ==
In order to reinforce research efforts among AMC members as well as to remain in contact with international organizations, the Academia coordinates various exchange and research support programs by maintaining solid links with similar international associations. AMC currently collaborates closely with the following international organizations:

- National Academy of Sciences, US
- InterAcademy Panel on International Issues
- InterAcademy Council
- Inter American Network of Academies of Science
- The Academy of Sciences for the Developing World (TWAS)
- Third World Network of Scientific Organizations
- Red Latinoamericana de Química
- Red Latinoamericana de Biología
- Royal Society of London
- Slovak Academy of Science
- American Chemical Society
- Mexico-United States Foundation for Science
- French Academy of Sciences
- Royal Society of Canada

== Sponsorship ==
Since its inception, the Academia Mexicana de Ciencias has enjoyed the support of various public and private institutions that have generously contributed to its activities. These include the National Council of Science and Technology, the Ministry of Public Education and the National Autonomous University of Mexico, among other institutions which have enabled the Academia to consolidate several programs, create others and support many of the activities involved in the country's scientific work.

== See also ==
- CONACYT

== Extra links ==
- http://www.amc.mx
