= David Carrasco =

American Mesoamericanist

Davíd Carrasco
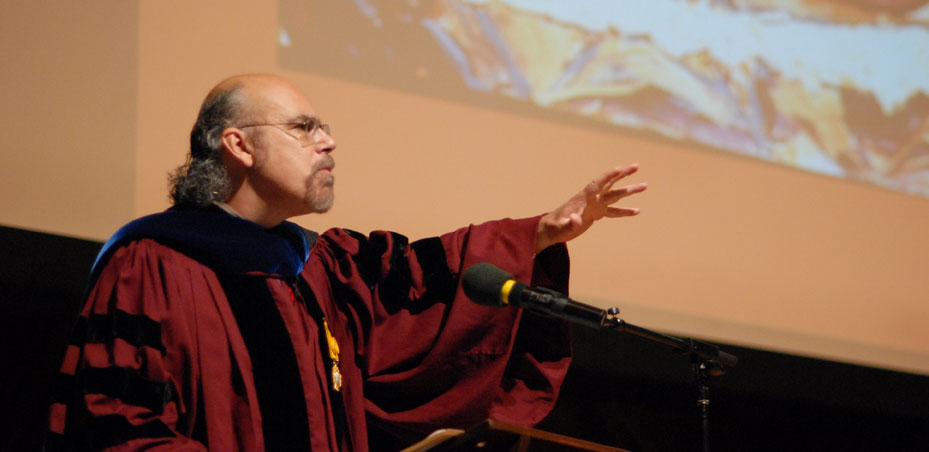
- Carrasco delivers the Harvard Divinity School Convocation Address in front of an image of "Boxcar" by George Yepes.
- Born: Davíd Lee Carrasco; Bainbridge, Maryland, U.S.
- Education: Western Maryland College (BA); University of Chicago (MA, Ph.D, Th.M)
- Writing career
- Genre: History
- Notable works: Religions of Mesoamerica; City of Sacrifice; Quetzalcoatl and the Irony of Empire: Myths and Prophecies in the Aztec Tradition
- Notable awards: Orden Mexicana del Águila Azteca

Davíd Lee Carrasco is an American academic historian of religion, anthropologist, and Mesoamericanist scholar. As of 2001, he holds the inaugural appointment as Neil L. Rudenstine Professor of Latin America Studies at the Harvard Divinity School, in a joint appointment with the Faculty of Arts and Sciences' Department of Anthropology at Harvard University. Carrasco previously taught at the University of Colorado, Boulder and Princeton University and is known for his research and publications on Mesoamerican religion and history, his public speaking as well as wider contributions within Latin American studies and Latino/a studies. He has made statements about Latino contributions to US democracy in public dialogues with Cornel West, Toni Morrison, and Samuel P. Huntington. His work is known primarily for his writings on the ways human societies orient themselves with sacred places.

== Early life and education ==
Carrasco descends from several generations educators from El Paso, Texas. His grandfather, Miguel Carrasco, founded and directed the Smelter Vocational School in El Paso, and his father, David Livingston Carrasco, was the first Mexican-American to serve as the Head Men’s Basketball Coach at a major U.S. university, American University. His father also founded and directed the El Paso Job Corps Center, which was renamed the David L. Carrasco Job Corps Center in 1991. The younger Carrasco received his BA degree at Western Maryland College with a major in English Literature, and attended the University of Chicago, where he earned three degrees in nine years: a Master of Theology, MA in History of Religions, and a Ph.D in the History of Religions. At Chicago, Carrasco's teachers included historians of religion Mircea Eliade, Charles H. Long, J. Z. Smith, the urban ecologist Paul Wheatley, and literary scholar Giles B. Gunn.

== Professional life ==
In 1978, Carrasco was invited by the Mexican archaeologist Eduardo Matos Moctezuma to participate in the interpretation of the discoveries made at the excavation of the Great Aztec Temple in Mexico City. One general result of the collaborations between Matos and Carrasco is the more than three decades of seminars and more than 30 book publications on Mesoamerican history and religion that have emerged from the Moses Mesoamerican Archive and Research Project. These publications include Carrasco's best selling academic title Religions of Mesoamerica: Cosmovision and Ceremonial Centers and City of Sacrifice. With the assistance of Scott Sessions, the Archive produced the Oxford Encyclopedia of Mesoamerican Cultures. Carrasco's encyclopedia won three publication awards. Among the members of the Mesoamerican Archive and Research Project are Doris Heyden, John D. Hoag, H. B. Nicholson, Alfredo López Austin, Anthony Aveni, Elizabeth H. Boone, Charles H. Long, Leonardo López Luján, William L. Fash, Barbara Fash, Saburo Sugiyama, José Cuéllar, William Taylor, Lindsay Jones, and Scott Sessions.

Carrasco's first book publication, Quetzalcoatl and the Irony of Empire: Myths and Prophecies in the Aztec Tradition (University of Chicago Press), won the Chancellor's Book Prize at the University of Colorado and, according to H. B. Nicholson: "This book, rich in ideas, constituting a novel approach.... Recommended to all serious students of the New World's most advanced indigenous civilization."

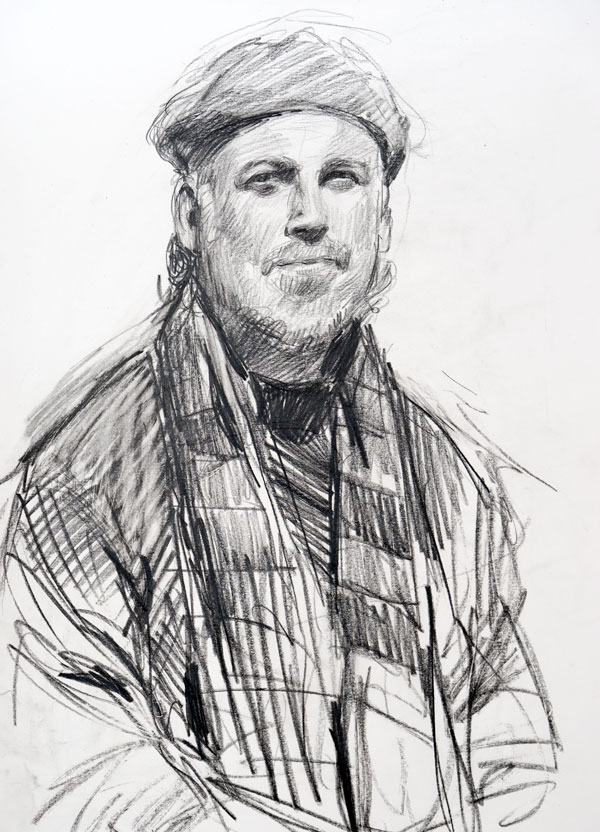
A pencil drawing of Carrasco done at Montmartre, Paris, by Gabor Gozon.

One of the foremost scholars of Mesoamerican religions and cultures, Carrasco has contributed particularly to the study of history, religion and symbolism of the Aztec and Teotihuacan cultures. Several of his publications have received awards, and in 2004, he received the Orden Mexicana del Águila Azteca, the highest decoration awarded by the Mexican government to foreigners. This award was the result of Carrasco's writings on Mesoamerican cities and religions, his teachings on the history of religions and Mexican American cultures, and his work at the Aztec Templo Mayor in Mexico City. In 2003, he was elected as a member of the American Academy of Arts and Sciences. He is the co-producer (along with Jose Cuellar and Alberto Camarillo) of Robert M. Young's award-winning Alambrista: Director’s Cut, which has been included in The Criterion Collection that specializes in licensing and selling "important classic and contemporary films". Carrasco's co-edited (with Nicholas J. Cull) 2004 book, Alambrista and the U.S.-Mexico Border: Film, Music and Stories of Undocumented Immigrants, was named a Southwest Book of the Year by the Tucson-Pima County Public Library. In 2006, Carrasco received the Mircea Eliade Jubilee medal, presented in absentia by the President of Romania, Traian Basescu. The Mircea Eliade award, named for the Romanian-born interpreter of world religions, was given as a sign of appreciation for contributions in the study of history of religion. In 2011, he was unanimously voted a Corresponding Member of the Mexican Academy of History. Carrasco's classroom teaching has resulted in recognition by the University of Colorado where he was chosen Presidential Teaching Scholar, 1991–93, and at Harvard University, where he was awarded the Petra T. Shattuck Excellence in Teaching Award in 2011 in the Harvard Extension School. In 2014, Carrasco was chosen as the Alumnus of the Year at the University of Chicago Divinity School.

Carrasco’s encounter with the Mexica and Spanish literature of the "encuentro" turned his attention to the problem of colonialism and religious syncretism. Following the work of William B. Taylor, he wrote a critique entitled "Jaguar Christians in the Contact Zone". In this and subsequent essays, he argued that indigenous peoples negotiated and manipulated Christian symbols and rites in terms of their local and ancestral traditions. He also examined the problem in the emerging Chicano Studies fields of scholarship which claimed to be rooted, in part, in the oro del barrio – the oral traditions and daily lives of Mexican American communities in the US. The more social science literature he read, the more he saw how religiosity was erased in the leading books and journals. Where were the shrines, home altars, miracles, symbols of saints, Jesus, curanderos and espiritistas and La Virgen de Guadalupe, among other expressions of Chicano religiosity? Did they not exist in the "oro del barrio" or in the "pueblo/pueblo" models claiming to illuminate the social history of Mexican Americans? Carrasco produced three essays designed to illuminate Chicano and Latino religiosity: "Bless Me, Ultima as a Religious Text2 which is included in the Chicano Studies Reader, "Cuando Dios y Usted Quiere: Between Religious Experience and Social Thought", and 2Borderlands and the biblical hurricane: Images and Rhythms of Latino Life". In 2019, his essay "What is Aztlan? Homeland, Quest, Female Place", appeared as the lead article in the Routledge Handbook of Chicana/o Studies, edited by Francisco A. Lomeli, and Denise A. Segura.

While at Harvard, Carrasco became associated with the David Rockefeller Center for Latin American Studies and was introduced to the Mapa de Cuauhtinchan #2 through the generosity of the Mexican philanthropist Angeles Espinosa Yglesias. Carrasco organized a 15-person scholarly team in a five-year analysis of this early 16th-century codex/mapa resulting in the award-winning book, co-edited with Scott Sessions, Cave, City and Eagle’s Nest: An Interpretive Journey Through the Mapa de Cuauhtinchan #2 which was translated into Spanish in 2010. Carrasco credits Sessions with effectively editing several of his publications.

For his contributions to the history of religions Carrasco was invited to participate in three summer Eranos conferences in Ascona, Switzerland. The organizer during this epoch of Eranos Tagungen was the social philosopher Tilo Schabert who invited Carrasco to speak at conferences on the themes of "Guilt – Schuld – La Colpa – La Culpabilité", 1996, "The Language of Masks – Die Sprache der Masken – Il Linguaggio delle Maschere – Le Language des Masques, 1998 and ‘Religions – the religious experience / Religionen – die religiöse Erfahrung / Religions – l'expérience religieuse / Religioni – l'esperienza religiosa" 2004. Carrasco was also present at the research seminar on Eranos held in the fall of 2000 on the Monte Verità. While he did not deliver a paper, Carrasco took part in the deliberations, and was present throughout the seminar. The Proceedings of the seminar were published, to which Carrasco contributed a recollection.

Carrasco worked closely with the writer Toni Morrison and escorted her to Mexico City on two occasions to visit archaeological sites, Frida Kahlo's home, and to meet Gabriel García Márquez. Carrasco was the prime mover in publishing one of Morrison’s final works while she was alive, Goodness and the Literary Imagination, co-edited with Stephanie Paulsell and Mara Willard. Carrasco also appears in Timothy Greenfield Sanders' 2019 film, Toni Morrison: The Pieces I Am. Carrasco is working on a book of his collected essays and another on the 500th anniversary of the war for Tenochtitlan/Mexico City led by Fernando Cortez against Moctezuma Xocoyotzin's Aztecs.

Carrasco is foreign member of the Academia Mexicana de la Historia.

== Published works ==
- Waiting for the Dawn: Mircea Eliade in Perspective Paperback | written by D. Carrasco, and edited with Jane M. Law (2009 with new photos and essays)
- The History of the Conquest of New Spain by Bernal Díaz del Castillo | as editor (2009)
- Breaking Through Mexico's Past: Digging the Aztecs with Eduardo Matos Moctezuma | written with Leonardo López Luján (2007)
- Cave, City, and Eagle's Nest: an Interpretive Journey Through the Mapa de Cuauhtinchan | edited with Scott Sessions (2007)
- Alambrista and the U.S.-Mexico Border: Film, Music, and Stories of Undocumented Immigrants | edited with Nicholas J. Cull (2004)
- Arqueología e Historia del Centro de México. Homenaje a Eduardo Matos Moctezuma | Edited with Leonardo López Luján and Lourdes Cué (2003)
- The Oxford Encyclopedia of Mesoamerican Cultures: the Civilizations of Mexico and Central America | as General Editor (2001)
- Mesoamerica's Classic Heritage: from Teotihuacan to the Aztecs | edited with Lindsay Jones and Scott Sessions (2000)
- City of Sacrifice (1999)
- Daily Life of the Aztecs: People of the Sun and Earth | written with Scott Sessions(1998)
- Moctezuma's Mexico: Visions of the Aztec World | written with Eduardo Matos Moctezuma (1992)
- To Change Place: Aztec Ceremonial Landscapes | as editor (1991)
- Religions of Mesoamerica | (1990)
- Waiting for the Dawn: Mircea Eliade in Perspective | (1985)
- Quetzalcoatl and the Irony of Empire: Myths and Prophecies in the Aztec Tradition | (1982)
