= Leonardo López Luján =

Mexican archaeologist (born 1964)

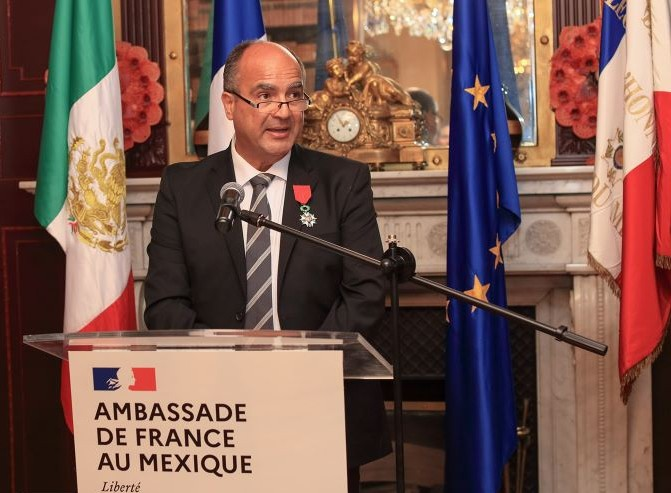
- Leonardo López Luján, chevalier de l'Ordre de la Légion d'Honneur, 2024
- Born: 31 March 1964 (age 62); Mexico City
- Education: Escuela Nacional de Antropología e Historia, Université de Paris X Nanterre
- Known for: Excavations in Teotihuacan and Tenochtitlan. Studies on the origins of Mesoamerican archaeology
- Awards: Fellow British Academy; Fellow El Colegio Nacional; Guggenheim Fellowship; Shanghai Archaeology Forum Award; Honorary Fellow American Academy of Arts & Sciences; Foreign Fellow Académie des Inscriptions et Belles-Lettres; National Prize for Arts and Sciences
- Scientific career
- Fields: Archaeology
- Workplaces: Mexico's National Institute of Anthropology and History
- Academic advisors: Eduardo Matos Moctezuma, Michel Graulich, Pierre Becquelin

Leonardo Náuhmitl López Luján (born 31 March 1964 in Mexico City) is an archaeologist and one of the leading researchers of pre-Hispanic Central Mexican societies and the history of archaeology in Mexico. He is director of the Templo Mayor Project in Mexico's National Institute of Anthropology and History (INAH) since 1991 and son of renowned historian Alfredo López Austin. He is fellow of El Colegio Nacional, the British Academy, the Society of Antiquaries of London, the Real Academia de la Historia in Madrid, the American Academy of Arts & Sciences, the Archaeological Institute of America, and the Académie des Inscriptions et Belles-Lettres in Paris.

== Education and professional life ==
López Luján received his bachelor's degree in archaeology from Mexico's National School of Anthropology and History (ENAH), which he attended from 1983 to 1987 as a student of Eduardo Matos Moctezuma, who directed his thesis on the Offerings of the Templo Mayor of Tenochtitlan (1990). In 1992 he pursued doctoral studies at the Paris Nanterre University as a student of Jean-Claude Gardin, Michel Graulich, and Alain Schnapp. His dissertation, "Anthropologie religieuse du Templo Mayor, Mexico: La Maison des Aigles" (The Religious Anthropology of the Templo Mayor, Mexico: The House of Eagles), presented in 1998 under the direction of Pierre Becquelin and Michel Graulich, obtained the highest honors.

During his academic career he has been a visiting research fellow at Princeton University (1995), the Musée de l'Homme in Paris (2002), Harvard University's Dumbarton Oaks (2005-2006), and the Institut d'Études Avancées from Paris (2013-2014), and a visiting professor at the University of Paris I Panthéon-Sorbonne (2000), the University of Rome–La Sapienza (2004 and 2016), the École Pratique des Hautes Études in Paris (2011), and Francisco Marroquín University in Guatemala (2011).

In INAH, he has been a full-time research professor at the Templo Mayor Museum since 1988 and part-time teaching professor at the National School of Conservation, Restoration, and Museography (ENCRYM) since 2000.

He was president of the Mexican Society of Anthropology from 2003 to 2005 and has been a member of the administration council of the Société des Américanistes since 1999. He is currently a Level III Researcher in Mexico's National System of Researchers (SNI) and member of the Mexican Academy of Sciences, and the Mexican Academy of History.

In recent times López Luján has been elected as an international fellow of the British Academy (FBA), as an honorary fellow of the Society of Antiquaries of London (Hon FSA), as a foreign corresponding fellow of the Real Academia de la Historia in Madrid, as an honorary international fellow of the American Academy of Arts & Sciences, as a corresponding member of the Archaeological Institute of America, and as a foreign corresponding fellow of the Académie des Inscriptions et Belles-Lettres in Paris, recognizing his contributions to the field of Mesoamerican research.

On November 5, 2018, López Luján was elected new member of El Colegio Nacional (The National College), a Mexican honorary academy that brings together the country's forty foremost artists and scientists.

In 2025 López Luján was awarded the 2024 National Prize for Arts and Sciences in the History, Social Sciences, and Philosophy category, the highest distinction awarded by the Mexican federal government.

== Research, fieldwork and museum exhibitions ==
His research has focused primarily on the religion, politics, and art of pre-Hispanic societies in Central Mexico. His scholarship has contributed to our knowledge of indigenous strategies of recovering the distant past, the coded language of buried offerings, the conceptualization of animals as cosmic emblems, the functions and symbolism of sacred architecture, the uses and meanings of Mexica sculpture, the application of materials science to the study of pre-Hispanic art and artifacts, iconoclastic activities in times of crisis, mother goddess cults, and sacrificial practices, among other areas. He has also ventured into the history of Mexican archaeology, achieving significant advances in the study of its origins in the eighteenth and nineteenth centuries.

López Luján began working in archeological, anthropological, and historical projects when he was eight years old. He has participated in various scientific teams in the Mexican federal entities of Campeche, Chiapas, Distrito Federal, Guanajuato, Estado de México, Morelos, and Quintana Roo, and in Ecuador.

The year 1980 was especially significant in his career, for he began working at INAH's Templo Mayor Project in the first (1978–1982) and second (1987) seasons of excavations in Tenochtitlan's sacred precinct under the direction of Eduardo Matos Moctezuma. Eleven years later, in 1991, he became the director of the project and currently occupies this position. In this way, he has led the fourth (1991–1992), fifth (1994–1997), sixth (2004–2006), seventh (2007–2014), eighth (2014–2018), ninth (2018-2024), and tenth (2024-2030) archaeological field seasons.

As part of his research at the archaeological site of Teotihuacan, he co-directed with William L. Fash and Linda Manzanilla the Xalla Palace excavation project and also worked with Saburo Sugiyama and Rubén Cabrera on the Pyramid of the Moon Project.

His own projects have been funded by INAH, the University of Colorado at Boulder, the University of Texas at Austin, Princeton University, and Harvard University.

With renowned colleagues he has curated major exhibitions, including "The Aztec World" at the Field Museum in Chicago, "Moctezuma: Aztec Ruler" at the British Museum in London, "El capitán Dupaix y su álbum arqueológico de 1794" (Captain Dupaix and his 1794 archaeological album) at the National Museum of Anthropology in Mexico City, as well as "Camino al Mictlan" (The Way to the Land of the Dead), "La Casa de las Águilas" (The House of Eagles), "Sacrificios de consagración en la Pirámide de la Luna" (Consecration Sacrifices at the Pyramid of the Moon), "Humo aromático para los dioses" (Aromatic Smoke for the Gods), and "Nuestra sangre, nuestro color: la escultura polícroma de Tenochtitlan (Our Blood, Our Color: Tenochtitlan's polychromed sculpture) at the Templo Mayor Museum. More recently he curated two major exhibitions in Japan and France: "Ancient Mexico" at the Tokyo National Museum with Saburo Sugiyama and Takeshi Inomata (2023-2024) and "Mexica: Des dons et des dieux au Templo Mayor" at the Musée du quai Branly in Paris with Fabienne de Pierrebourg and Steve Bourget (2024).

== Awards and fellowships ==
=== As an individual or leader of interdisciplinary teams ===
- The "Diario de México/CONACYT Medal" for best student in Mexico (1991).
- "Eugene M. Kayden Humanities Book Award" from the University of Colorado at Boulder (1991).
- The "Mexican Committee of Historical Sciences Prize" for best article (1992, 1996, and 2007).
- "Choice Outstanding Academic Book" (1994).
- The "Alfonso Caso Award" from Mexico's National Institute of Anthropology and History (1998 and 2016, and honorable mention in 1991).
- "Social Sciences Research Award" from the Mexican Academy of Sciences (2000).
- "Keynote Address at Convocation" at the 2009 Annual Conference of the College Art Association (the only Latin American to receive this distinction in the association's history).
- "Shanghai Archaeology Forum Research Award 2015", Chinese Academy of Social Sciences (his Great Temple Project is considered one of the ten best archaeological programs of the world in 2013–2015).
- "Medal of Merit", Festival del Centro Histórico de la Ciudad de México (2016).
- "Top 10 Discoveries of the Year" of Archaeology Magazine, Archaeological Institute of America (2017, 2022, and 2023).
- "Medal Fray Bernardino de Sahagún", Consejo Hidalguense de la Crónica and Gobierno del Estado de Hidalgo (2019).
- "Crónica Award" in the field of culture (2019).
- "Cátedra Latinoamericana Julio Cortázar", University of Guadalajara (2023).
- The "Antonio García Cubas Scientific Book Award" from Mexico's National Institute of Anthropology and History (2023 and 2025).
- "Medal 7 de Julio", Congreso Nacional de Patrimonio Mundial (2023).
- "Honorary Doctorate in Philosophy", University of Copenhagen (2023).
- "Chevallier de l'Ordre National de la Légion d'Honneur", Republic of France (2024).
- "National Prize for Arts and Literature in the History, Philosophy, and Social Sciences category", Government of Mexico (2024).
- "Caniem Award for Editorial Art in the Scientific and Technical Books category, and in the Digital Books category", Cámara Nacional de la Industria Editorial Mexicana (2025 and 2026).
- "Premio Miguel Covarrubias-Beatriz Barba Ahuatzin" from Mexico's National Institute of Anthropology and History (2025, and honorable mention in 2024).
- "Prix Raymond et Yvonne Lantier", Académie des Inscriptions et Belles-Lettres, Paris (2025).
- "The Tlamatini Award", The Art History Society and California State University, Los Angeles (2026).

=== As an integrant of interdisciplinary teams ===
- "Best Reference Source", Library Journal (2001).
- "Editor's Choice", Booklist (2001).
- "Best Reference", New York Public Library (2001).
- "Outstanding Academic Title", Choice: Current Reviews of Academic Books (2001 and 2017).
- "1er Prix International du Livre d'Art Tribal", Tribal Art Magazine (2009).
- "Shanghai Archaeology Forum Field Discovery Award 2013" (Moon Pyramid Project, Teotihuacan), Chinese Academy of Social Sciences (2013).
- "Annual Book Award", Association for Latin American Art (2014).
- "Premio Nacional de las Artes Gráficas", Unión de Empresarios de la Comunicación Gráfica (2016).
- "Prix Spécial du Jury", 6e Festival International du Livre d'Art et du Film de Perpignan (2016).
- "PROSE Award, Art Exhibitions Category", Association of American Publishers (2018).
- "The Best of Art of 2017", The New York Times (2017).
- "The Best of 2017", Hyperallergic (2017).
- "The Best of 2018", The Washington Post (2018).
- "AAMC Award for Excellence, Catalogue Award", The Association of Art Museum Curators (2018).
- "Bank Note of the Year (2021) Award", International Bank Note Society (2022).
- "ERC Advanced Grant", European Research Council (2024-2029).

=== Fellowships and named lectures ===
- The "Salvador Novo Fellowship" from the College of Mexico and the Mexican Writers Center (1985).
- The "Guggenheim Fellowship" from the John Simon Guggenheim Memorial Foundation (2000).
- "Dumbarton Oaks Research Fellowship", Harvard University (2005–2006).
- "Senior Fellow", Pre-Columbian Studies, Dumbarton Oaks, Harvard University (2012–2014).
- "Research Fellowship", Institute for Advanced Studies of Paris (2013–2014).
- Distinguished Lectures at Cambridge, Copenhagen, Harvard, Yale, Brown, Stanford, Berkeley, Arizona, Florida, Missouri, Wellesley College, Dumbarton Oaks, the British Museum, the Musée du quai Branly, the Tokyo National Museum, the De Young Museum, the San Antonio Museum of Art, The Library of Congress, the Académie des Inscriptions et Belles-Lettres, the Shanghai Archaeology Forum, the Gran Teatro Nacional del Perú, as well as the Casa de América, the Fundación Juan March, and the Spanish National Research Council in Madrid.

== Published works ==
=== Books and essays (author) ===
- La recuperación mexica del pasado teotihuacano, 1989.
- Nómadas y sedentarios: el pasado prehispánico de Zacatecas, 1989.
- The Offerings of the Templo Mayor of Tenochtitlan, 1993, 1994, 2005.
- Xochicalco y Tula, with Robert H. Cobean and Guadalupe Mastache, 1995, 1996.
- Mito y realidad de Zuyuá, with Alfredo López Austin, 1999, 2017.
- Viaje al mercado de México, 2000, 2013.
- Mexico's Indigenous Past, with Alfredo López Austin, 1996, 1998, 2001, 2012, 2014.
- Aztèques. La collection de sculptures du Musée du quai Branly, with Marie-France Fauvet-Berthelot, 2005.
- La Casa de las Águilas, 2 vols., 2006.
- Tenochtitlan, with Judy Levin, 2006.
- Breaking Through Mexico's Past, with Davíd Carrasco and Eduardo Matos Moctezuma, 2007, 2007.
- Escultura monumental mexica, with Eduardo Matos Moctezuma, 2009, 2012, 2019.
- Monte Sagrado/Templo Mayor: el cerro y la pirámide en la tradición religiosa mesoamericana, with Alfredo López Austin, 2009, 2012.
- Tlaltecuhtli, 2010.
- El capitán Guillermo Dupaix y su álbum arqueológico de 1794, 2015.
- Arqueología de la arqueología: ensayos sobre los orígenes de la disciplina en México, 2017, 2019.
- Pretérito pluscuamperfecto: visiones mesoamericanas de los vestigios arqueológicos. Lección inaugural de El Colegio Nacional, 2019.
- Los primeros pasos de un largo trayecto: la ilustración de tema arqueológico en la Nueva España del siglo XVIII. Discurso de ingreso de la Academia Mexicana de la Historia, 2019.
- El ídolo sin pies ni cabeza: la Coatlicue a finales del México virreinal, 2020.
- El pasado imaginado: arqueología y artes plásticas en México (1440-1821), 2021.
- Los muertos viven, los vivos matan: Mictlantecuhtli y el Templo Mayor de Tenochtitlan, 2021.
- Arqueología mexicana: sus orígenes y proyecciones, with Eduardo Matos Moctezuma, 2024.
- Xcalumkín, historia de un centro maya puuc, Tomo 2: Excavaciones, materiales e interpretaciones, written by Pierre Becquelin y Dominique Michelet, with the contribution of Rodolfo Ávila, Eric Taladoire, Marie-Charlotte Arnauld, Leonardo López Luján, Julie Patrois, Sara Dzul Gongora, Grégory Pereira, Chloé Andrieu y Daniel Salazar Lama, Centro de Estudios Mexicanos y Centroamericanos, 2025.

=== Books, catalogs, and journals (editor) ===
- Atlas histórico de Mesoamérica, with Linda Manzanilla, 1989.
- Historia antigua de México, 4 vols., with Linda Manzanilla, 1994–1995, 2000–2001, 2014.
- Camino al Mictlan, with Vida Mercado, 1997.
- La Casa de las Águilas: reconstrucción de un pasado, with Luis Barba, 2000.
- Gli Aztechi tra passato e presente, with Alessandro Lupo and Luisa Migliorati, 2006.
- Sacrificios de consagración en la Pirámide de la Luna, with Saburo Sugiyama, 2006.
- Arqueología e historia del Centro de México. Homenaje a Eduardo Matos Moctezuma, with Davíd Carrasco and Lourdes Cué, 2006.
- Moctezuma: Aztec Ruler, with Colin McEwan, 2009, 2010.
- The Art of Urbanism: How Mesoamerican Kingdoms Represented Themselves in Architecture and Imagery, with William L. Fash, 2009, 2012.
- El sacrificio humano en la tradición religiosa mesoamericana, with Guilhem Olivier, 2010.
- Humo aromático para los dioses: una ofrenda de sahumadores al pie del Templo Mayor de Tenochtitlan, 2012, 2014.
- El oro en Mesoamérica, special issue of Arqueología Mexicana, 2017.
- Nuestra sangre, nuestro color: la escultura polícroma de Tenochtitlan, 2017.
- Al pie del Templo Mayor de Tenochtitlan: estudios en honor de Eduardo Matos Moctezuma, with Ximena Chávez Balderas, 2 vols., 2019.
- La arqueología ilustrada americana: la universalidad de una disciplina, with Jorge Maier Allende, 2021.
- Eduardo Matos Moctezuma: ochenta años, 2021.
- Los animales y el recinto sagrado de Tenochtitlan, with Eduardo Matos Moctezuma, 2022.
- Ancient Mexico: Maya, Aztec, and Teotihuacan. Exhibition Catalogue (in Japanese), with Saburo Sugiyama and Takeshi Inomata, 2023.
- Mexica: Des dons et des dieux au Templo Mayor, with Fabienne de Pierrebourg and Steve Bourget, 2024.
- Mexico-Tenochtitlan: Dynamism at the Center of the World, with Barbara E. Mundy and Elizabeth Hill Boone, 2025.
- Agua y vida en la Cuenca de México: siglos XV-XXI, 2026.
- Teotihuacan: urbe y orbe, special issue of Arqueología Mexicana, 2026.

=== Series (editor) ===
Together with Joel Skidmore, López Luján coordinates the series of monographic volumes "Reportes del Proyecto Templo Mayor", books co-published by the National Institute of Anthropology and History in Mexico City and the Ancient Cultures Institute in San Francisco.

- María Barajas Rocha, De la excavación al museo: la restauración del monolito de la diosa Tlaltecuhtli, 2019.
- Alejandra Aguirre Molina, Un umbral al inframundo: la Cámara 3 del Templo Mayor de Tenochtitlan, 2020.
- Víctor Cortés Meléndez, El desollamiento humano entre los mexicas, 2020.
- Erika Robles Cortés, Los cocodrilos, símbolos de la tierra en las ofrendas del Templo Mayor, 2022.
- Israel Elizalde Mendez, Ofrendas del Templo Mayor: el cautiverio de animales en la antigua ciudad de Tenochtitlan, 2026.
- Mirsa Islas Orozco, El Mayorazgo de Nava Chávez: arqueología histórica de un predio a través de su cerámica colonial, 2026.
