= Arturo Montero =

Mexican archaeologist

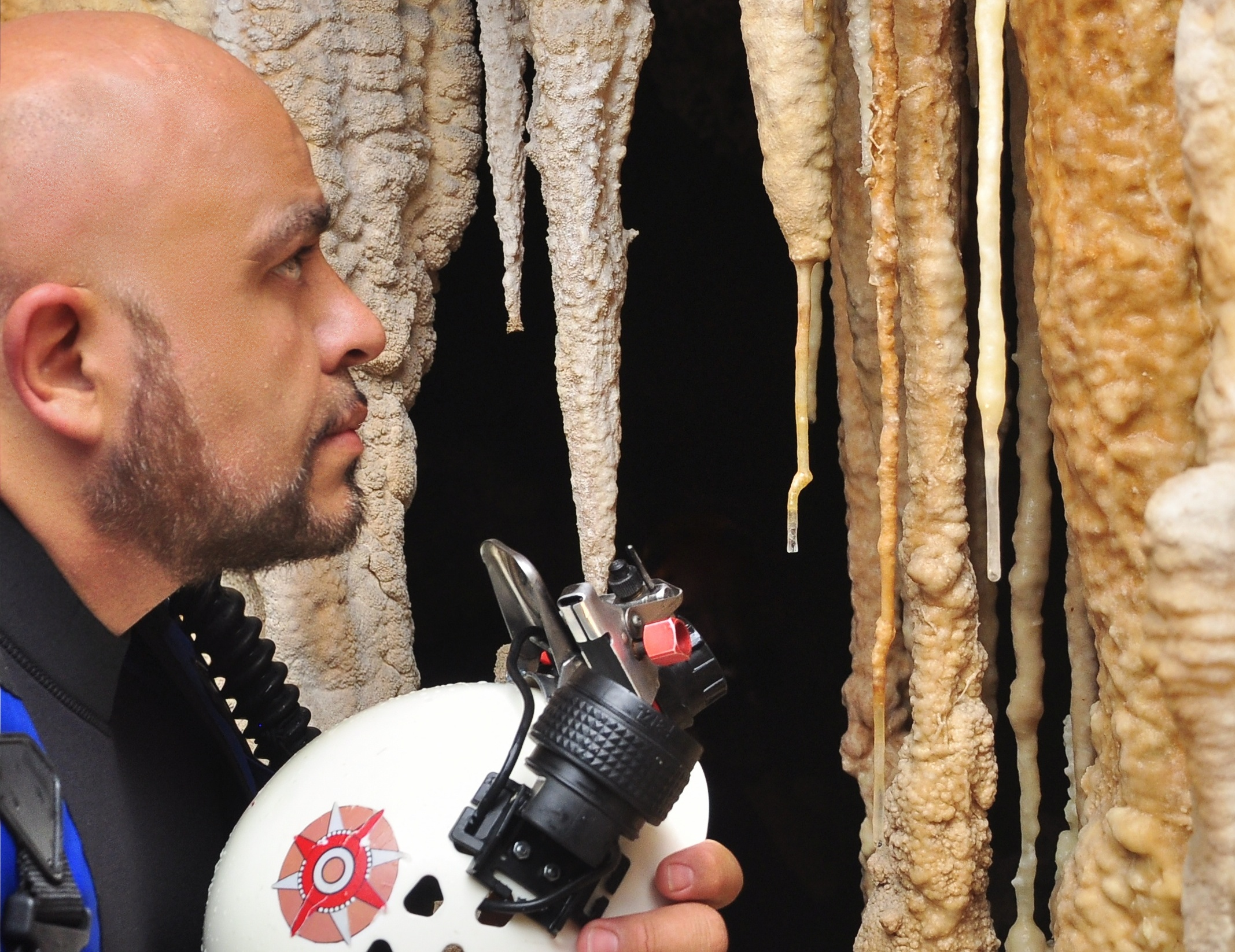
- Born: December 15, 1961 (age 64); Mexico City, Mexico
- Education: Escuela Nacional de Antropología e Historia
- Occupation: Archaeologist
- Employer: Universidad del Tepeyac
- Awards: National Forest Merit Award, 2002 State Award for Conservation, 2008 Medal of Merit for the Conservation and Strengthening of the Integral Heritage of Humanity, 2021
- Website: www.montero.org.mx

Ismael Arturo Montero García (Mexico City, December 15, 1961) Mexican archaeologist, who has discovered 53 sites with pre-Hispanic evidence in the high mountains of Mesoamerica, for which he obtained the National Award for Forestry Merit, by the Government of Mexico in the year 2002, International Year of Mountains, declared by Unesco. In 2009, he led the expedition that discovered the highest site in the world on the path of the terrestrial equator, he has published scientific articles and books that have earned him the recognition of the Encyclopedia "Wielka Encyklopedia Gór i Alpinizmu" for his contribution to the mountaineering field.

He collaborated as a speleologist in the Great Mayan Aquifer project, a project that in 2018 received public recognition from the Congress of the Union, by agreement of the LXIII Legislature of the Chamber of Deputies. He currently serves as director of the organization Ipan tepeme ihuan oztome (ITIO), has taught for 30 years in different public and private universities and recently at the University of the Army and the Air Force, he is director of the Science Research and Dissemination Center at the University of Tepeyac. After completing his academic stay as a national researcher at the National Council of Science and Technology, he chose to dedicate his efforts to the conservation of natural and cultural heritage at the National Commission of Natural Protected Areas, in the office of biocultural affairs as a Consultant to the United Nations (UN) until mid-2025.

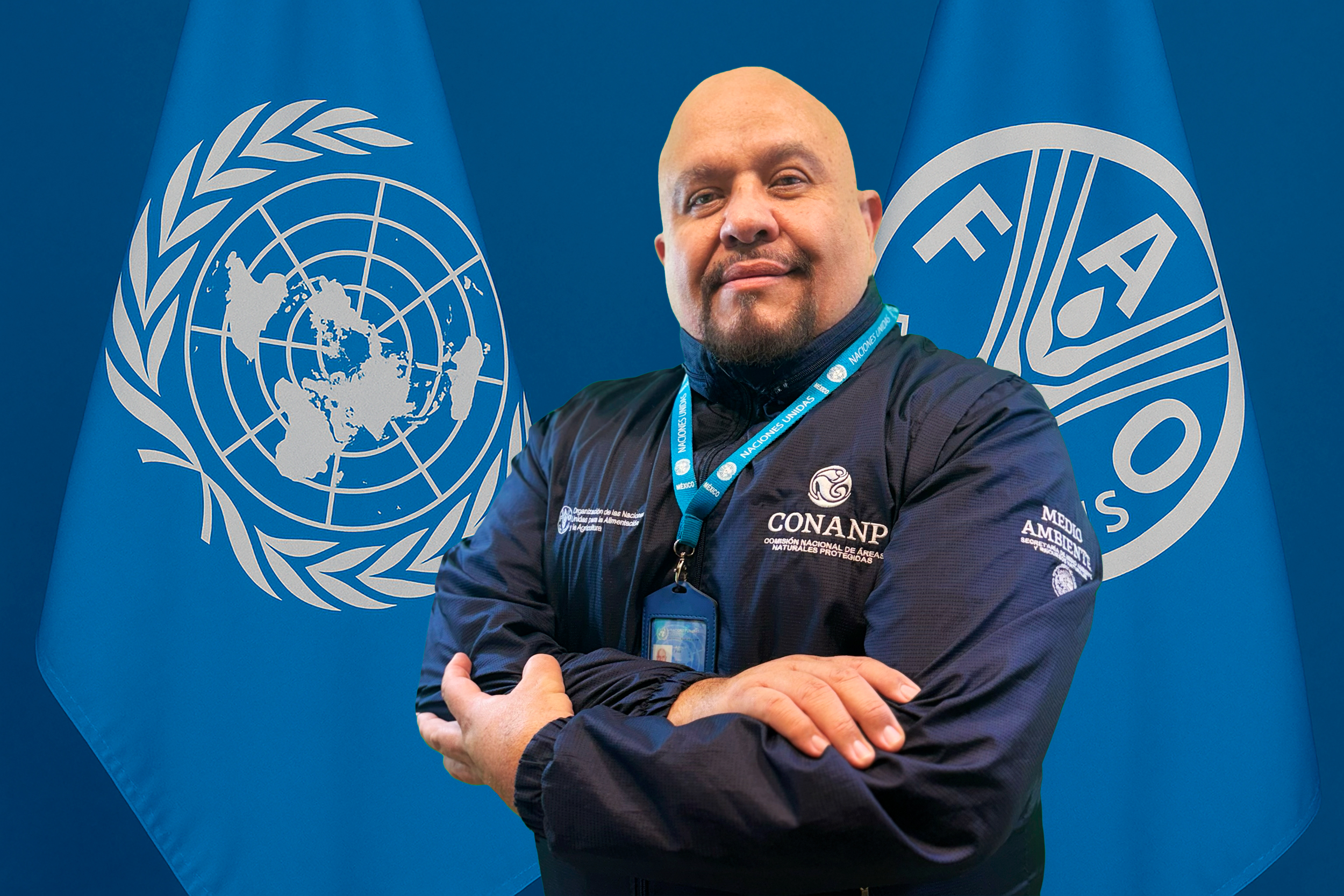
Between 2022 and mid-2025, Arturo Montero, PhD dedicated his efforts to the conservation of natural and cultural heritage at the National Commission of Protected Natural Areas (SEMARNAT-CONANP), where he collaborated on biocultural issues as a consultant for the Food and Agriculture Organization of the United Nations.

== Biography ==
Arturo Montero, descends from a family of several generations of soldiers, his father the artillery major Alfonso Montero and his mother the lieutenant nurse Luz Lidia García, is an only child. He begins his studies at the Salesian College. Later, from a different educational perspective, he attended high school at the College of Sciences and Humanities of the UNAM, at this stage of his life, at age 17, he was discharged as a lifeguard in the ambulance and emergency service of the Mexican Red Cross. Afterwards, he entered the bachelor's degree in archeology at the National School of Anthropology and History where he graduated in 1988 with the thesis Iztaccihuatl, arqueología en alta montaña, with honorable mention. In the year 2000, he continues with the master's degree in Mexican history at the Faculty of Philosophy and Letters of the UNAM where he attends the field of archeology in caves, with the thesis Las formaciones subterráneas naturales en la historia de México, with mention honorific. In 2005, he began his doctorate in Symbolic Anthropology from the National School of Anthropology and History and graduated with honorable mention with the thesis: Los símbolos de las alturas. For the year 2010, he received a scholarship from Conacyt with a postdoctoral stay in the Universidad Iberoamericana, in the research line Environment, society and culture in rural societies.

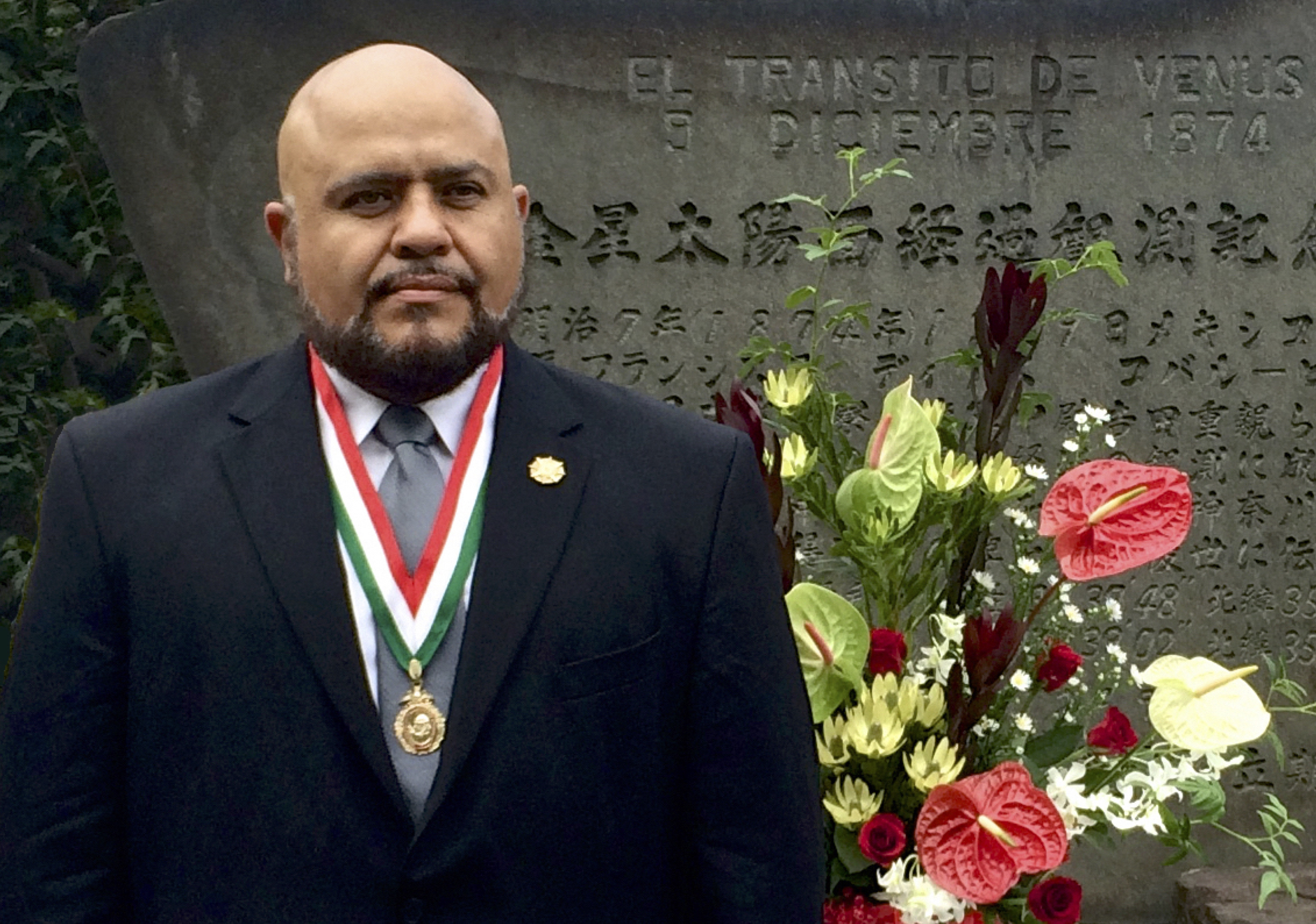
Commemorating in Yokohama the Mexican astronomical expedition of 1874 to Japan as a member of the SMGyE, 2014.

Recently, he has carried out research in the field of archaeoastronomy, proposing orientation models that have been published in academic and broadcast media such as National Geographic magazine. He is the author of twelve books, has coordinated seven more and has written 75 research articles published in the country and abroad. He currently serves as director of the Center for Research and Dissemination of Science at the University of Tepeyac.

=== Period in the Mexican Red Cross ===
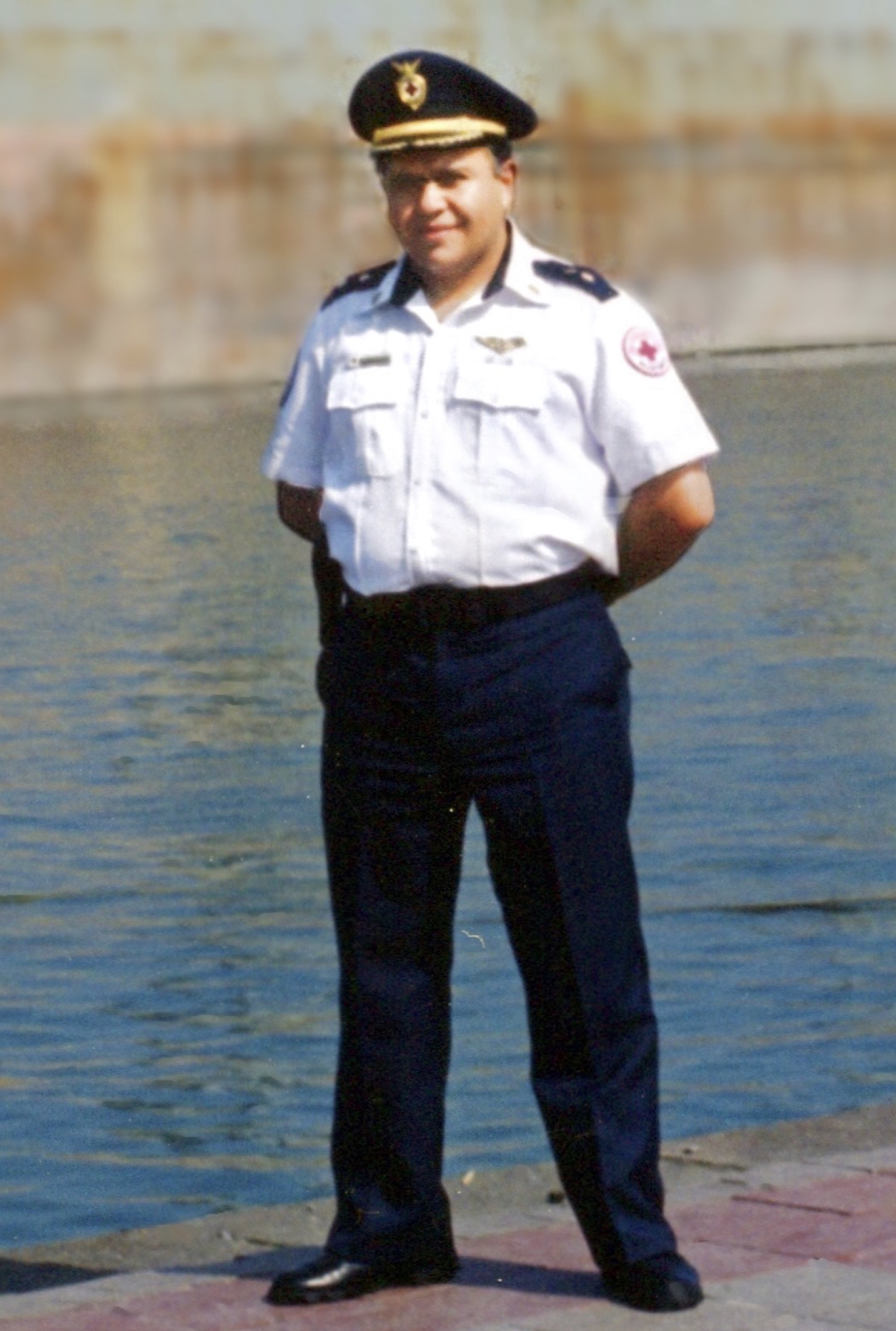
Commander Arturo Montero in a garrison uniform during the work of the XXXIII National Convention of the Red Cross in Veracruz, 1998.

Before beginning his studies in archeology, he joined the Mexican Red Cross as a lifeguard in the ambulance and emergency service at the age of 17. He specialized from the beginning in high mountain rescue techniques and in underground rescue (caves). In 1988, he graduated as a paramedic from the Superior School of Medicine of the National Polytechnic Institute. At the age of 28, in 1989, he reached the rank of Commander when he was appointed director of the National School of Speleology. Since 1989 he operated as a radio amateur with the call sign XE1-ZLX to help in disaster situations. By 1995, he was certified as a rescue diver by the National Aquatic School. In 1999, he was appointed Head of the High Mountain Rescue Section. In 2000, with his closest collaborators, he founded the National Rough Land Rescue Unit, dedicated above all to helping vulnerable communities in remote regions during disasters. His last operation in charge of a rescue section was carried out in 2005. Currently, when a catastrophe occurs in the country, he is occasionally required by the Mexican Red Cross to carry out damage assessment and needs analysis during a disaster event. disaster or major emergency.

=== Exploration period: mountains and caves ===
The trajectory of Arturo Montero in the archaeological and historical research of high mountains and speleology began in 1985 with the excavation of the highest archaeological site in North America, on the summit of the Iztaccíhuatl volcano at 5,260 meters above sea level, since then he has mainly developed in these fields, including wilderness exploration, diving, and river navigation.

He has led expeditions to the main chasms and peaks of Mexico, the Amazon, the Andes, Polynesia, the Alps, Cuba, the Cascade Range, the Atacama Desert, and the Galapagos Islands. Given his experience in research and documentation, he has been a research professor at the Meritorious Autonomous University of Puebla. He has taught at the universities of Tepeyac, the Valley of Mexico, Ibero-American and the National School of Anthropology and History. He also served as visiting professor at the National University of Salta in Argentina, and was vice president of the Mexican Union of Speleological Groups (2002-2004). In 2007, he was co-director of the Nevado de Toluca Underwater Archeology Project. In addition, he collaborated as an honorary member of the Advisory Committee for the Conservation of Archaeological Materials of High-Altitude Inca Sanctuaries in Argentina and was a current member of the Conacyt register of evaluators until 2021. He is currently an occasional reviewer of scientific articles for the National Institute of Anthropology and History and the Meritorious Autonomous University of Puebla.

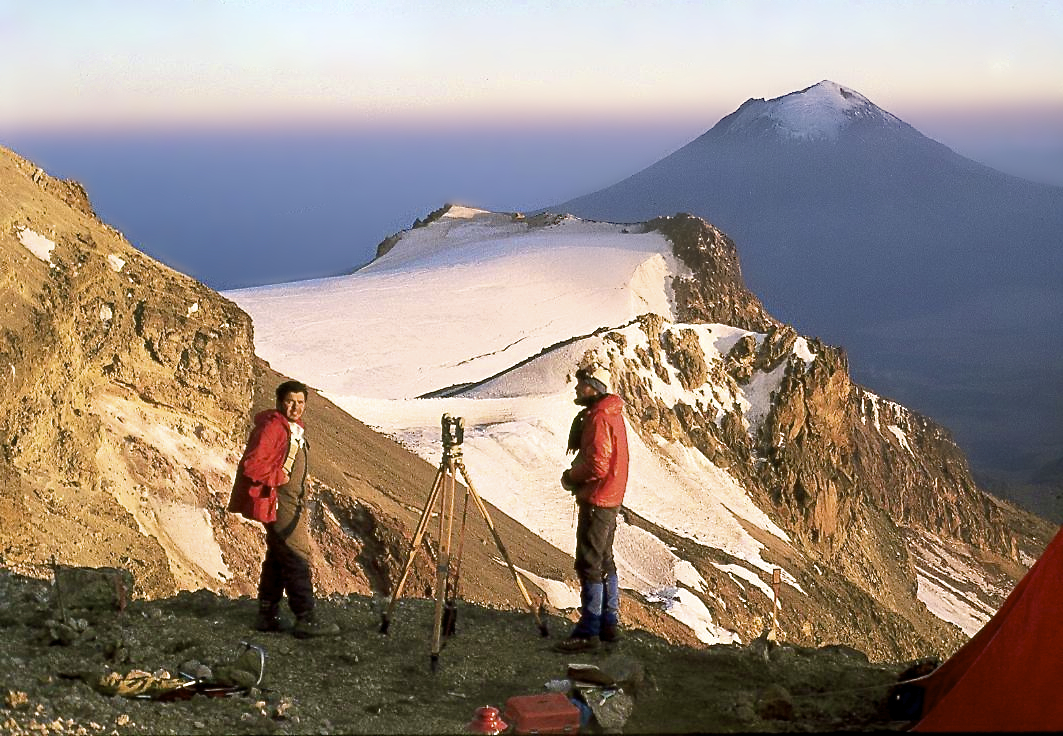
Iztaccihuatl and Popocatépetl show their glaciers from the archaeological camp, on top of Iztaccihuatl in 1985. Left Arturo Montero, right S. Iwaniszewski.

The activities of research, documentation and conservation of cultural and natural heritage have led it to be part of: the Mexican Society of Geography and Statistics; the Mexican Association of Mammalogy; the Mexican Society for the History of Science and Technology; the National Cave Rescue Commission of the National Speleological Society; and the Society for American Archaeology.

=== Ipan tepeme ihuan oztome period ===
Since 2005, he coordinates the Ipan tepeme ihuan oztome organization, which is dedicated to the dissemination of scientific culture, oriented to archeology, astronomy, history and anthropology, all linked to the care of cultural and natural heritage. that seeks to promote the value of scientific culture. This organization is made up of a group of professionals dedicated to research from various areas of knowledge.

As part of this organization, in 2009, Arturo Montero led the 0°φ / 0 °C Expedition that discovered the highest point in the world where the equatorial line crosses. In 2012, during the expedition to the Holtún cenote, archaeoastronomical observations were made on El Castillo, the main pyramid of Chichén Itzá, finding that it is oriented towards the zenith passage of the Sun, to serve as an astronomical marker with which the Mayans adjusted their calendar. In August 2013 the National Geographic magazine published this astronomical geometric model of orientation.

== Divulgation of scientific culture ==
Astronomy, mathematics, geometry and architecture were the greatest achievements of indigenous science. Dr. Arturo Montero's objective is to reach a wide public to share the scope of pre-Hispanic knowledge that surprised Europe and the world since the 16th century, and that currently attracts millions of tourists who are amazed when visiting the archaeological sites of Mexico.

The objective is to use new technologies such as the LiDAR scanner and digital photogrammetry to create 3D models, produce television programs using animations and multimedia resources, as well as presentations and publications on social networks to promote knowledge outside the academic redoubts that exclude to all those who are not specialists, it is an inclusive project that allows knowledge to reach everyone to forge a "popular scientific culture".

He has recently ventured into the media as a television and radio host, and also a collaborator with cultural reports for the country's written press.

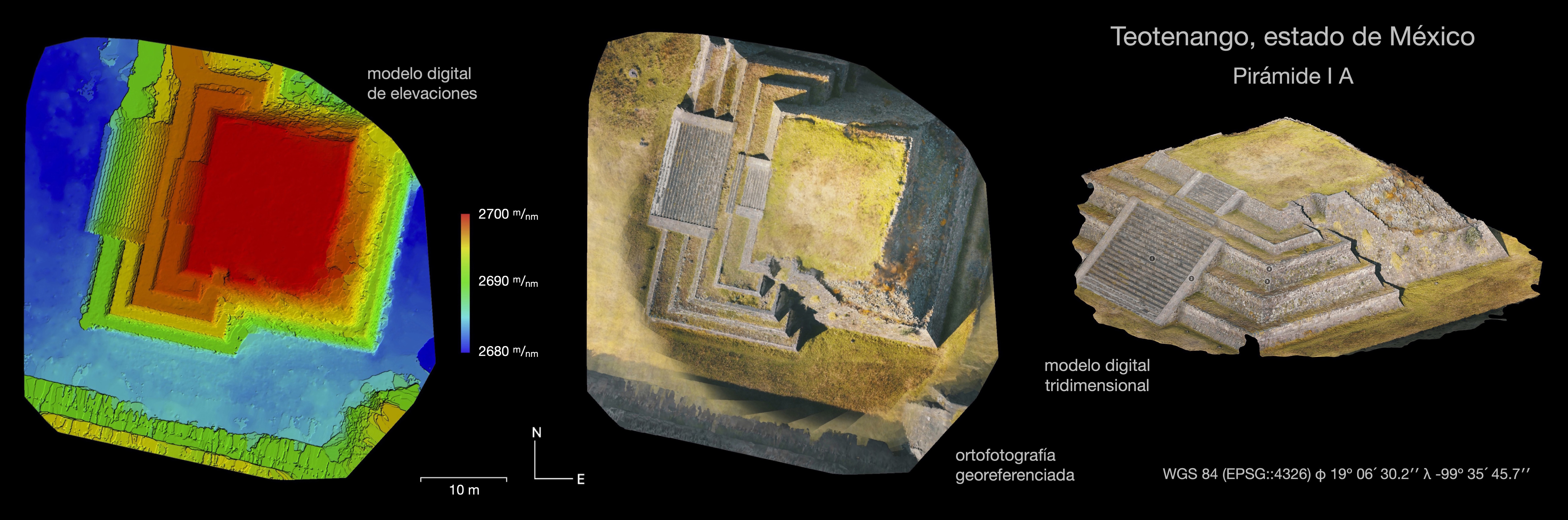
Using high-resolution images from an unmanned aerial vehicle (dron), Arturo Montero obtains products such as georeferenced digital photogrammetry for the study and dissemination of archaeological knowledge.

== Prizes and awards ==
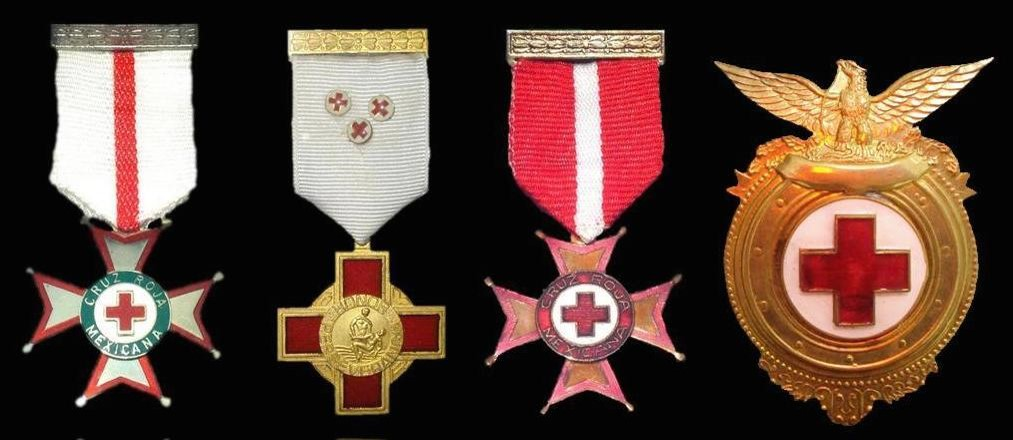
Distinctions granted by the Mexican Red Cross to Commander Arturo Montero, in his 27 years of service.

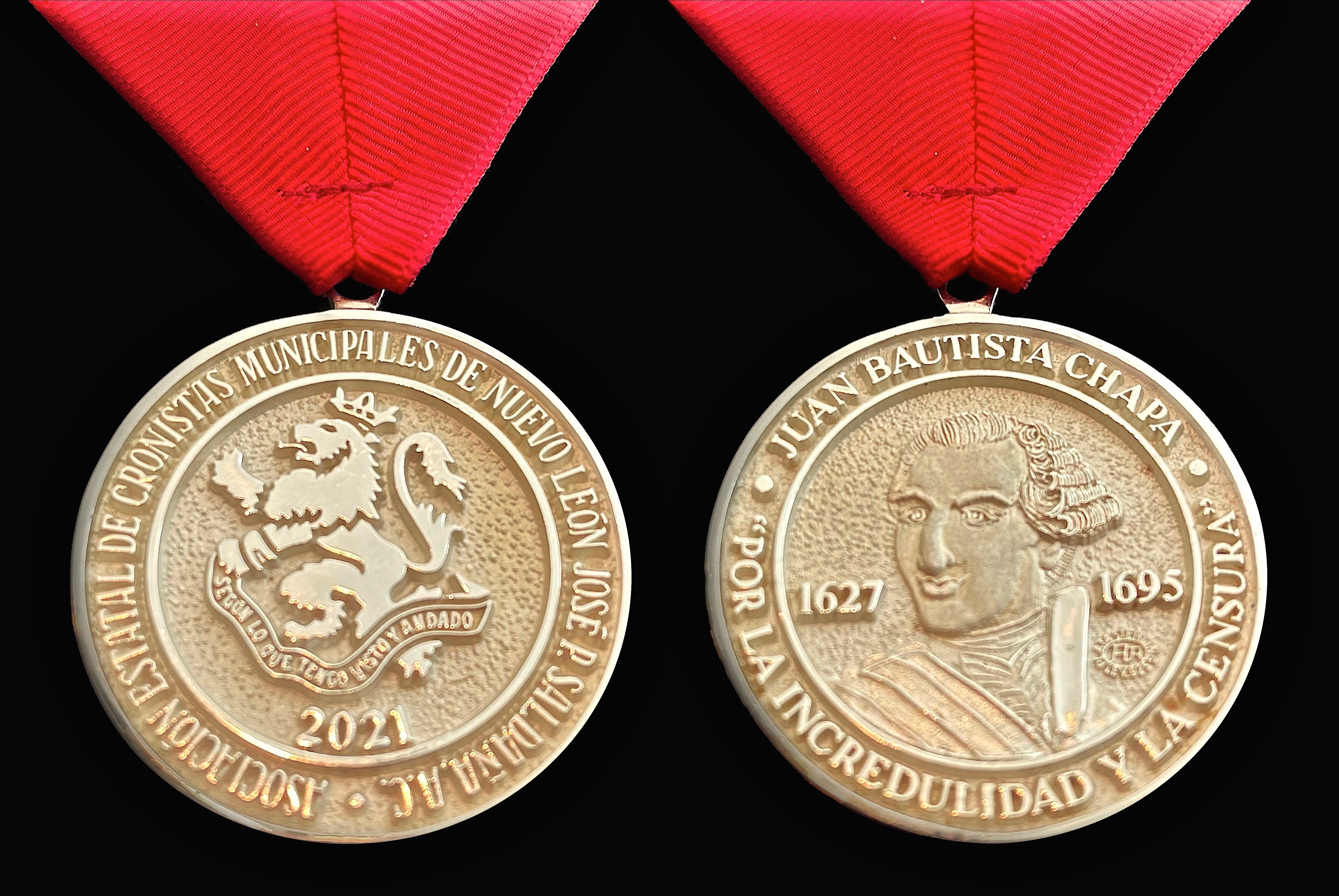
Medal of Merit for the Conservation and Strengthening of the Integral Heritage of Humanity, conferred on Dr. Arturo Montero, 2021.

- 2025 NASA Recognition with the title “Galactic Local Collaborator” for the “NASA International Space Apps Challenge”.
- 2023 Recognition of Teaching Merit for his outstanding academic work in the postgraduate program at the University of Tepeyac.
- 2022 Award from the Continuing Education Network of Latin America and Europe in the Internationalization of Continuing Education category, to the academic team of the project "Tláloc, el jaguar y la serpiente: arte y arqueología en la América indígena" of the Institute of Aesthetic Research of the University National Autonomous of Mexico.
- 2022 Recognition of Teaching Merit for his outstanding academic work in the postgraduate course at the University of Tepeyac.
- 2021 Recipient of the Medal of Merit for the Conservation and Strengthening of the Integral Heritage of Humanity Juan Bautista Chapa, in the International category, awarded by the State Association of Municipal Chroniclers of Nuevo León.
- 2018 Public recognition that the Congress of the Union, by agreement of the LXIII Legislature of the Chamber of Deputies, grants to the team of researchers and explorers of the Great Maya Aquifer Project.
- 2016 Presidents Alpine Award, Meritorious Mexican Academy of Mountaineering.
- 2012 Karol Wojtyła Distinction, for outstanding academic career, Universidad del Tepeyac.
- 2008 State Award for Conservation, Secretary of the Environment, Government of the State of Mexico.
- 2002 National Award for Forestry Merit, Secretariat of Environment and Natural Resources, International Year of Mountains declared by UNESCO.
- 2000 Degree Silver Medal of the Order of Honor and Merit, Mexican Red Cross.
- 1999 National Award of Merit, Mexican Red Cross.
- 1999 Degree Bronze Medal of the Order of Honor and Merit, Mexican Red Cross.
- 1997 Recognition, Private Assistance Board for the Federal District for 15 years of altruistic service.
- 1997 First place, for best web page, Second Mexico Internet Contest.
- 1990 Decoration of Perseverance, Mexican Red Cross.

== Expeditions and scouting ==
- 2025 Archaeoastronomical survey of the Jantar Mantar site in Rajasthan, India.
- 2025 Archaeological survey in the Teotihuacán Valley, with ascents to 20 peaks.
- 2024 Toltecayotl astronomical expedition to the Zone of Silence to record the total solar eclipse of April 8, 2024.
- 2018 Collaboration in the Great Mayan Aquifer Project, coordinated by Guillermo de Anda with work on landscape archeology and archaeoastronomy.
- 2018 Topographic record of the cultural heritage of high mountains in Mesoamerica using a remotely piloted aircraft and digital photogrammetry technology without intervening in the sites, Conanp-Mexican Society of Geography and Statistics.
- 2017 Poyauhtlan, archaeological expedition to Pico de Orizaba with the discovery of a transcendent high-mountain pre-Hispanic shrine.
- 2014 Archaeoastronomical Expedition to Mount Fuji. In commemoration of the “Year of the Mexico-Japan Exchange”.
- 2012 Expedition to the Holtún cenote. Logistics and assembly for vertical work for a caving-diving and archeology project for National Geographic.
- 2009 Expedition 0°φ/0 °C (Expedition zero degrees latitude, zero degrees Celsius). Reaching the discovery of the site at the highest altitude in the world where it crosses the line of the terrestrial equator, Republic of Ecuador from September 14 to October 2.
- 2009 Exploration in the Galapagos archipelago. Reflections from social anthropology regarding the ecological conflict and the solution paths, Republic of Ecuador from June 1 to 8.
- 2009 Mexican archaeoastronomical mission. Realization of astronomical calculations of the archaeological site Cerro Catequilla, for the National Institute of Cultural Heritage, Republic of Ecuador, from May 27 to 30, 2009, International Year of Astronomy.
- 2002 Archaeological survey of the summit of Cerro Negro or Malcante at 5150 meters above sea level, Cordillera Oriental Andina, Argentina, November 19.
- 1999 Prospecting for a land approach route to Cape Froward in the Strait of Magellan, the southernmost continental point of the American continent, in collaboration with the lifeguard corps of the Chilean Red Cross, Punta Arenas branch. Chilean Antarctic Region.
- 1999 Speleoanthropology. Prospecting of the Ana Te Pora and Ana Te Pahu caves in Polynesia, Rapa Nui Island, Easter.
- 1997 High Mountain, glacier crossing and alpine skiing in Europe: southern slope of Mount Mönch and Jungfraujoch, in the Swiss Alps; on the Mer de Glace glacier, Chamonix France; and in Italy at Pico Helbronner.
- 1996 Andean Amazon Expedition of the Mexican Red Cross. Jungle crossing and partial navigation works; prospecting in the Amazon, Nanay, Napo, Momon, Marañón and Ucayali rivers with a route of 1,000 km in the countries of Peru, Colombia and Brazil; cartographic works with the mooring of the source of the Amazon River. In high mountains, ice climbing and descent into crevasses in the Viejo del Huayna Potosí glacier in the Cordillera Real de los Andes, Bolivia. Climbing to Pico Chacaltaya in the Cordillera Real de los Andes, Bolivia. Crossing in arid zones in the vicinity of Nazca, Department of Ica, Peru.
- 1996 Exploration, navigation and prospecting of the Santa María River, Huasteca Potosina. Courses of class IV rapids. Participants: UNAM Mountaineering and Exploration Association and the Mexican Red Cross.
- 1996 Exploration and prospecting in the Zone of Silence (Chihuahua, Coahuila, Durango). National School of Speleology of the Mexican Red Cross.
- 1995 Tekax '95 interdisciplinary caving project. Participants: Yucatecan Society of Speleology, Mexican Red Cross delegations D. F., Mérida and Tekax, and National School of Anthropology and History.
- 1994 Archaeological survey of the Pico de Orizaba with the collaboration of the National Schools of High Mountain and Speleology of the Mexican Red Cross, and students of the National School of Anthropology and History.
- 1993 Descent into the Sótano del Barro, Querétaro, in its time, the first deepest absolute vertical shaft in the world, National School of Speleology and Underground Rescue Section of the Red Cross in San Luis Potosí.
- 1992 Speleological survey of Cuban karst, Viñales, Cuba. Mexican Red Cross, National School of Speleology.
- 1991 Ascent to Mount Hood, Oregon, USA Club de Exploraciones de México A. C.
- 1991 Descent to the basements of Golondrinas (376 m) and Huahuas (202 m), National School of Speleology and Underground Rescue Section of the Red Cross in San Luis Potosí.
- 1990 Karst prospecting in Tekax, Yucatán. National School of Speleology of the Mexican Red Cross delegations Mérida, Tekax and Tizimín.
- 1990 Underwater prospecting to cenotes in Yucatán. National School of Speleology and Section of Aquatic Rescue of the Federal District of the Mexican Red Cross.
- 1990 Logistical support to the San Josecito speleopaleontological project of the INAH and the University of Texas, Nuevo León.
- 1987-1980 Speleology, prospecting in the region of Cacahuamilpa and Taxco in several seasons by the Mountain School of the Mexican Red Cross Naucalpan delegation and later with the National School of Speleology. Some of the caves explored: La Joya sinkhole, Gavilán caves I and III, Ibarra basement, Poza Meléndez, Coatepec de Harinas cave, Acuitlapán drain, etc. In addition to different emergency services in the Chontacuatlán and San Jerónimo underground rivers.
- 1985 Alpine permanence at the summit of Iztaccíhuatl for a period of 11 days as part of the High Mountain Archeology Project, Institute of Anthropological Research, UNAM.
- 1980 Descent into the basement of San Agustín, Oaxaca, one of the deepest underground systems in the world. Rescue of two cavers from the Polish Expedition to Mexico. Activity carried out at a depth of 700 m on the so-called "Route 68".
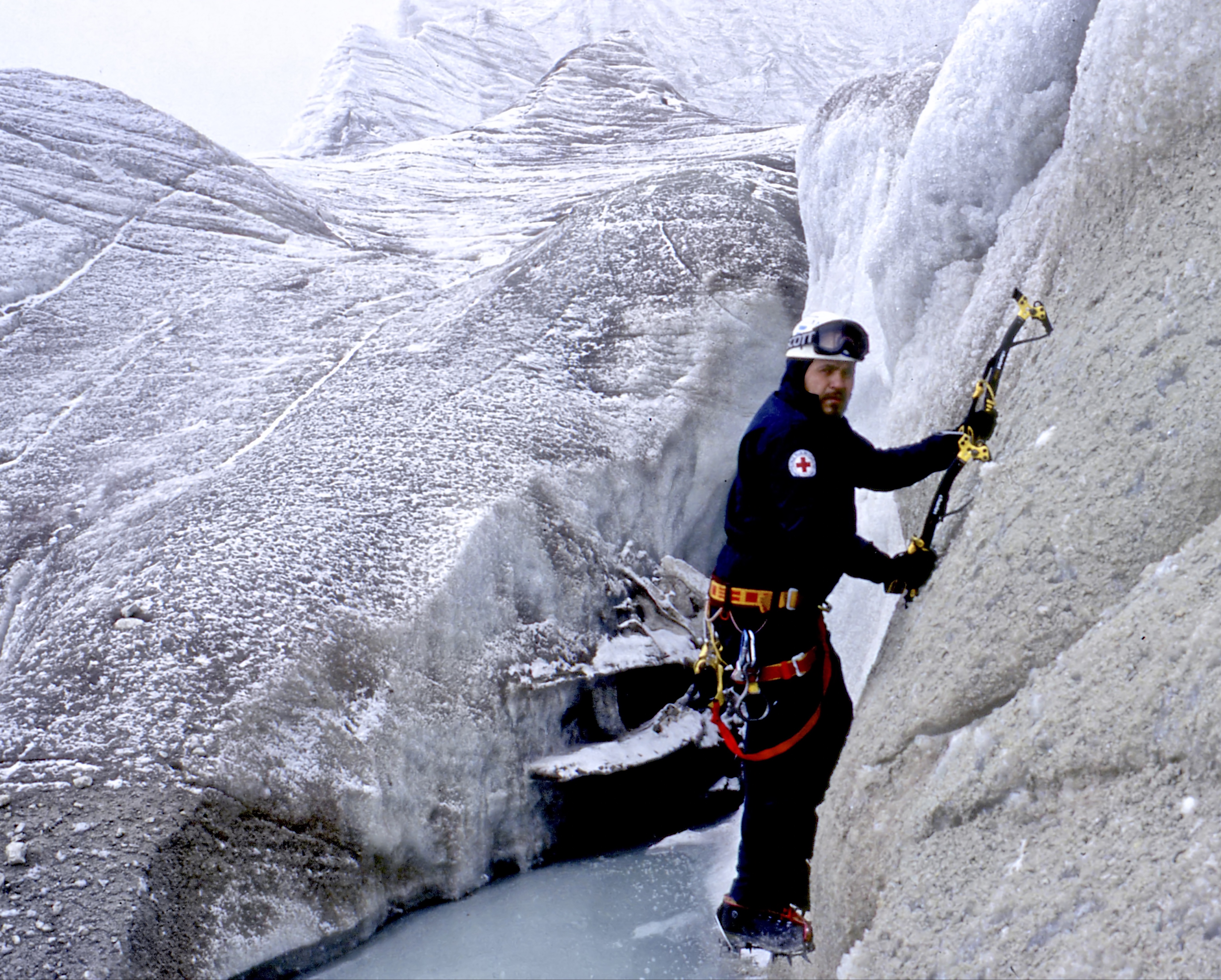
- Arturo Montero climbing the Viejo del Huayna Potosí glacier, during the Andean Amazon Expedition of the Mexican Red Cross in 1996.
  1979 Descent to the Cave of Swallows, San Luis Potosí. Third deepest absolute vertical shot in the world, Mexican Red Cross Naucalpan delegation.

== Publicaciones ==
He is the author of twelve books, has coordinated seven more and has written more than 75 research articles published in the country and abroad, this is his most relevant work:

- 2025 Astronomía, arquitectura, geometría y geografía en Teotihuacan, edited by the University of Tepeyac and iTiO Editions.
- 2025 Entre el cielo y el lago: La fundación de México-Tenochtitlán, edited by the University of Tepeyac and iTiO Editions.
- 2023 La astronomía en Mesoamérica, edited by Ipan tepeme ihuan oztome, Naucalpan.
- 2022 El Lago de Texcoco y México Tenochtitlán: 1519-1521, edited by Universidad del Tepeyac, Semarnat-Conanp, Mexico City.
- 2020 El Santuario del Fuego, edited by the Iztapalapa Mayor's Office, Mexico City.
- 2020 Cocotzin: Nuestra Señora de Los Remedios, edited by the University of Tepeyac, Mexico City.
- 2016 Explorando Tlaxcala, edited by the Government of the state of Tlaxcala, Tlaxcala.
- 2015 Chichén Itzá. Arquitectura, geometría y astronomía, edited by Ipan tepeme ihuan oztome, Naucalpan.
- 2013 El sello del Sol en Chichén Itzá, edited by the Armella Spitalier Foundation, Mexico, D. F.
- 2012 Matlalcueye. El volcán del alma tlaxcalteca, edited by the Government of Tlaxcala - SEP Tlaxcala, Mexico, D. F.
- 2011 Nuestro patrimonio subterráneo. History and culture of the caves in Mexico, edited by the National Institute of Anthropology and History, Mexico, D. F.
- 2010 En el vértice del Ecuador, edited by Ipan tepeme ihuan oztome, Mexico, D. F.
- 2009 Las aguas celestiales. Nevado de Toluca, edited by the National Institute of Anthropology and History, Subdirectorate of Underwater Archaeology, Mexico, D. F.
- 2009 La montaña en el paisaje ritual, edited by UNAM, National Institute of Anthropology and History and Meritorious Autonomous University of Puebla, first edition (2001), second edition (2007), reprint of the second edition (2009), Mexico, D. F.
- 2008 Mapa de Cuauhtínchan II. Entre la ciencia y lo sagrado, edited by the Mesoamerican Research Foundation, Mexico, D. F.
- 2004 Atlas arqueológico de la alta montaña mexicana, Secretariat of Environment and Natural Resources, Mexico, D. F.
- 2003 Taller básico de rescate agreste, edited by the Mexican Red Cross, first edition (2000), reprint (2003), Mexico, D. F.
- 2002 Huizachtepetl. Geografía sagrada de Iztapalapa, edited by the Iztapalapa Delegation of the Federal District, Mexico.
- 2000 Tepeyac. Estudios históricos, edited by the University of Tepeyac, Mexico, D. F.
- 1998 Los Volcanes, símbolo de México, edited by the Government of the Federal District, Mexico.

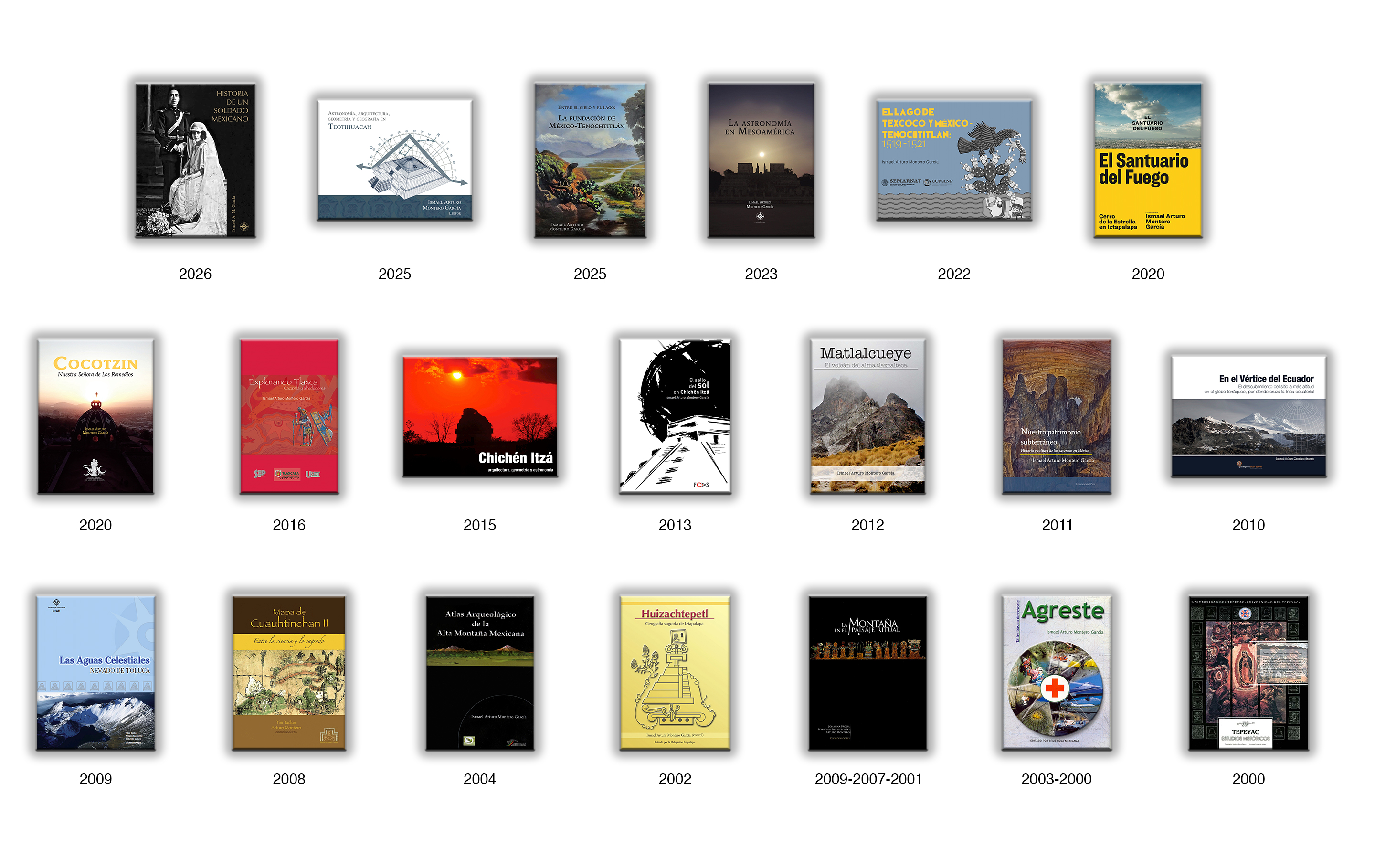
Covers of the books published by Arturo Montero as author or coordinator.
