= Linda Manzanilla =

Mexican archeologist (b. 1951)

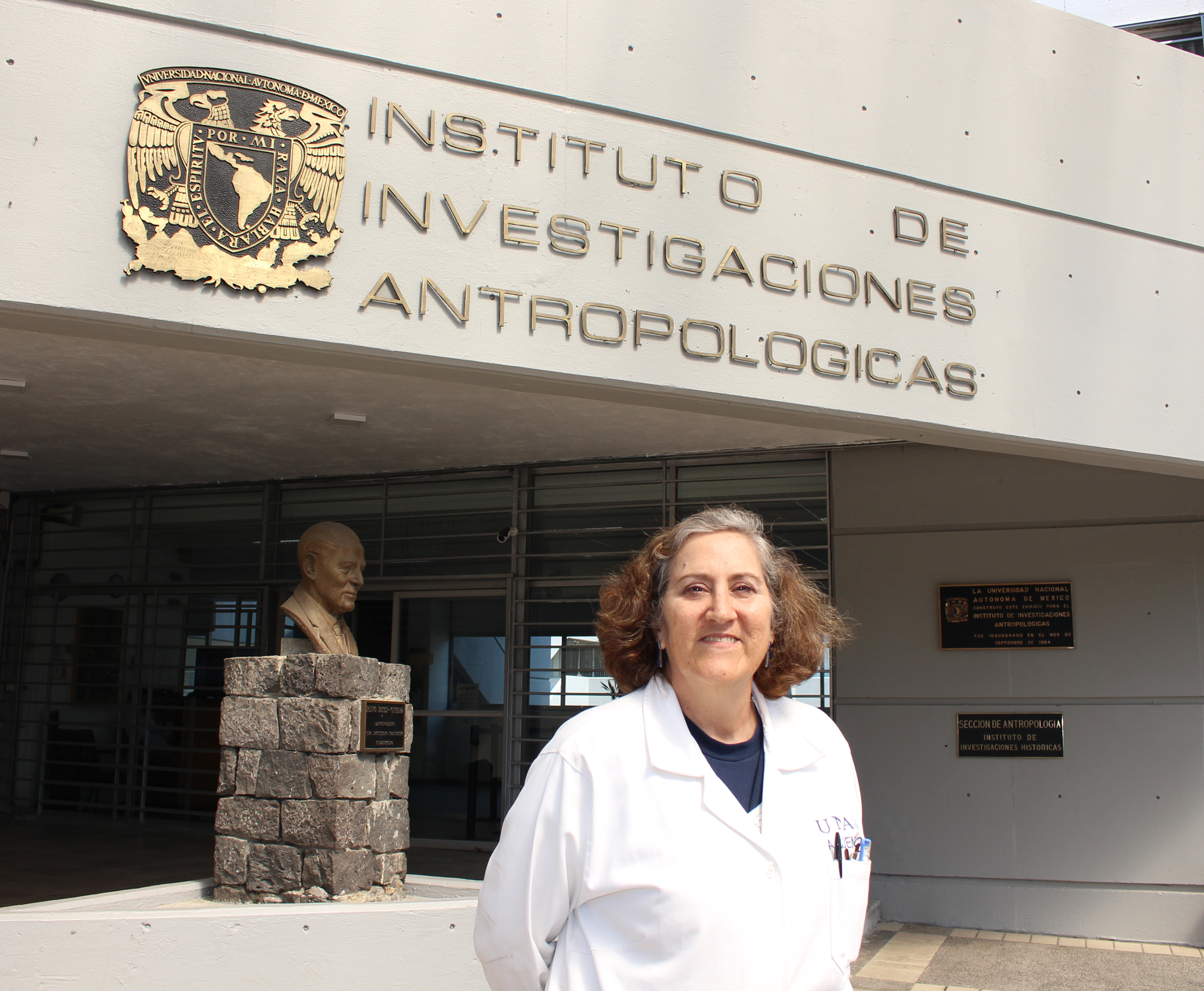
- Portrait in front of the Anthropological Research Institute
- Born: January 25, 1951 (age 75); Manhattan, New York City
- Occupations: Archaeologist; Egyptologist; researcher; academic
- Known for: Teotihuacan
- Parent: Víctor Manzanilla Schaffer

Academic background
- Education: National School of Anthropology and History
- Alma mater: Paris-Sorbonne University
- Thesis: Hypotheses et Indices du Processus de Formation de la Civilisation Egyptienne (1982)

Academic work
- Discipline: Mesoamerican Archaeology
- Sub-discipline: Teotihuacan, Olmec and Maya specialist
- Institutions: Anthropological Research Institute (UNAM)
- Website: www.iia.unam.mx/academico/3528

Linda Rosa Manzanilla Naim (born January 25, 1951) is a Mexican archaeologist, Egyptologist, researcher and academic.

Manzanilla is an important figure in the field of archaeology, particularly for her work in Mesoamerican studies. She is well known for her contributions to the understanding of the ancient civilizations of Mexico, especially the pre-Columbian cultures such as the Teotihuacan, Olmec and the Maya. Manzanilla has conducted extensive research on the social, political, and ritual practices of ancient societies and how they evolved over time.

Her research uses an interdisciplinary approach and mainly focuses on Teotihuacan.

== Life and academics ==
Manzanilla was born in Manhattan, New York City, on January 25, 1951. Her father was Víctor Manzanilla Schaffer, a diplomat and politician who later became Governor of Yucatán of German, Spanish and Indigenous origins whilst her mother, Roby Naim, was a translator for the United Nations of Egyptian, French ancestors who lived in Africa and spoke Arabic.

In 1970 she entered the National School of Anthropology and History (Spanish: Escuela Nacional de Antropología e Historia) where she received a degree in archaeology. She worked as a research assistant in the Department of Prehistory of the National Institute of Anthropology and History from 1972 to 1977. In 1979 she obtained a master's degree in anthropological sciences and graduated magna cum laude. She traveled to Paris to pursue a third-cycle doctorate in Egyptology from 1979 to 1982, at Paris-Sorbonne University.

In 1983, she became a researcher at the Anthropological Research Institute (Spanish: Instituto de Investigaciones Antropológicas) of the National Autonomous University of Mexico (UNAM), where she was director from 1998 to 2002. She is still a researcher in that institution. From 1975 to 2013 she was a professor of the Bachelor's Degree in Archaeology at the National School of Anthropology and History. Since 1997 she has been a professor of the Postgraduate Program in Anthropology at UNAM, and of the Bachelor's Degree in Anthropology at UNAM since 2017.

Manzanilla has been a visiting professor at Stanford University in the U.S. state of California, the University of Costa Rica, the International University of Andalucía (Spain), the Autonomous University of Yucatán (Mexico) and the Colegio de México. At Stanford she was Tinker Visiting Professor.

She is a researcher at the Anthropological Research Institute of the National Autonomous University of Mexico.

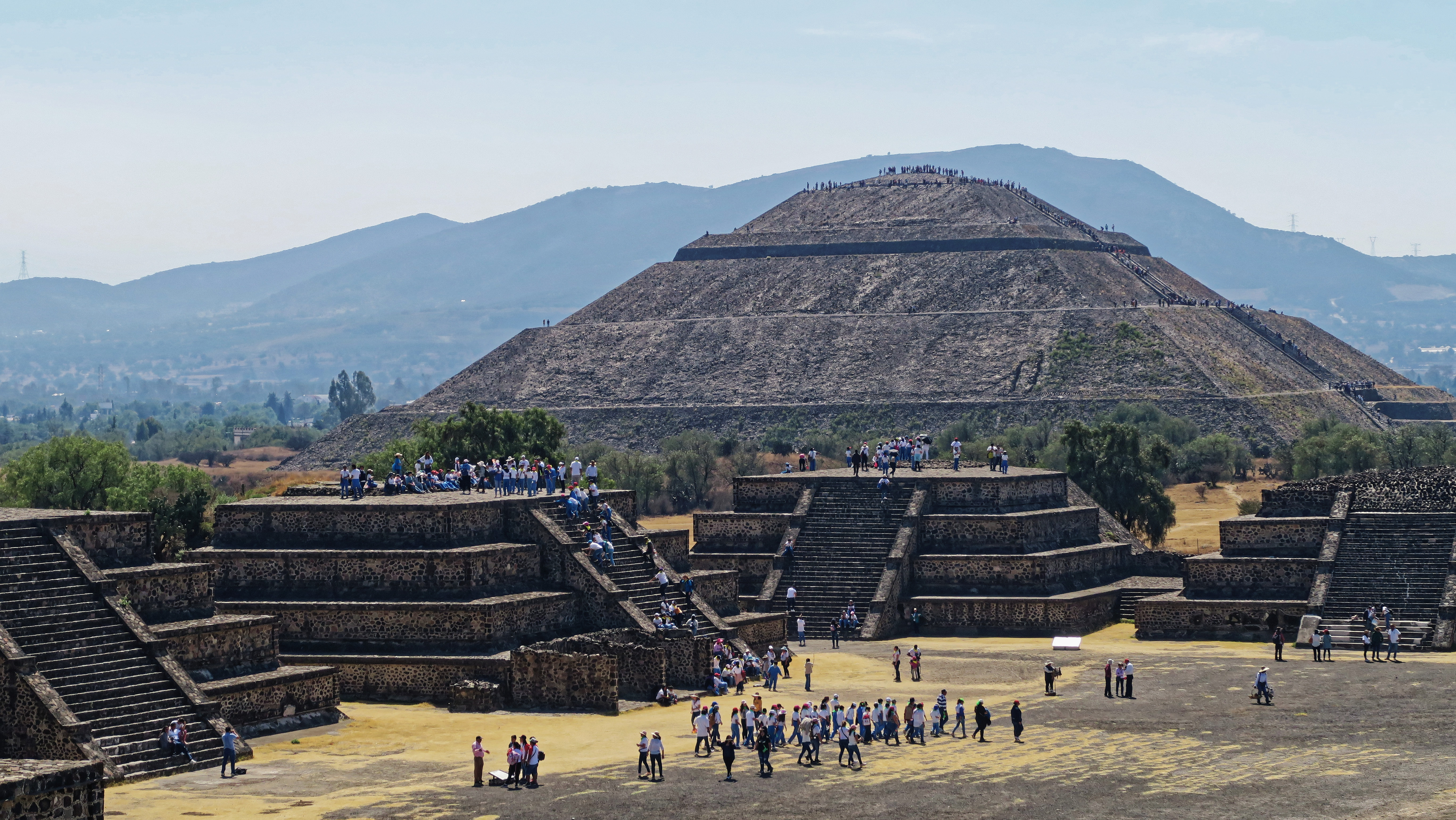
Teotihuacan and the Pyramid of the Sun

Manzanilla has excavated in Mexico, particularly at Teotihuacan and Cobá (1983 y 1984); in Xalasco, Tlaxcala (2008); Monte Albán, Oaxaca (1973); Abasolo, Guanajuato (1973); Lake Texcoco (1972) and Santa Marta, Chiapas (1973). Internationally she has excavated in Tiwanaku (Bolivia) as part of a project of the University of Chicago (1988–1989); Medinet Madi (Egypt) as part of the Italian Archaeological Missions of the University of Rome (1978), Arslantepe (Eastern Anatolia) as part of the Italian Archaeological Missions of the University of Rome (1976, 1984, 1989, 1996 and 2013) and Magdala (Israel) as consultant of the Project Magdala (2010 and 2012).

From 2000 to 2003 she co-directed the Xalla Palace Project at Teotihuacan, State of Mexico, with Leonardo López Luján and William Fash.

Her main efforts have focused on the early cities, the daily life of the inhabitants of Teotihuacan, and their functionally distinct assemblages and spaces (Xalla, Teopancazco, Oztoyahualco and the tunnels to the east of the Pyramid of the Sun); in this pyramid she has applied state-of-the-art technology such as the muon detector with Arturo Menchaca.

In the city of Cobá, Quintana Roo, she conducted research on domestic life in classic Maya sites.

== Memberships ==
Manzanilla has belonged to over 20 science organizations. In 2003 she was elected an international member of the National Academy of Sciences of the United States, being the first Mexican to belong to this institution. On April 9, 2007, she joined El Colegio Nacional with the speech 'Teotihuacan: la gran anomalía de Mesoamérica', which was answered by Miguel León-Portilla and Octavio Novaro. Since 2006 she belongs to the American Philosophical Society and to the Academy of Sciences of Latin America (ACAL). She is a member of the National System of Researchers since 1985, and Emeritus National Researcher of the National System of Researchers since 2021. She has served as a member of the Committee for Research and Exploration of the National Geographic Society. She has also been member of the Boards of Trustees of the Universidad Autónoma Metropolitana (2004–2012) and the National Museum of the American Indian.

Manzanilla has been a member of the editorial boards of several journals, such as Ancient Mesoamerica (USA), Latin American Antiquity (USA), Journal of Archaeological Research (USA), Quaternary Research (USA-Netherlands), Trabajos de Prehistoria (Spain), Revista Arqueología (Argentina), Anales de Antropología, Revista Cuicuilco (ENAH), the journal of the Mexican Academy of Sciences, Cuadernos de Arquitectura Mesoamericana, Revista Mexicana de Estudios Antropológicos, Revista Tiempo y Región, Arqueología Mexicana, Estudios de Asia y África and National Autonomous University of Mexico magazine, as well of the encyclopedias Atlas Histórico de Mesoamérica, The Archaeology of Ancient Mesoamerica, Fundamental Issues in Archaeology, and the Oxford Encyclopedia of Mesoamerican Cultures.

Manzanilla was co-editor for three years of the journal Latin American Antiquity of the Society for American Archaeology alongside Gary Feinman.

== Publications ==
Author or editor of 32 books, 220 articles and chapters, 9 reviews and 73 technical reports on the emergence and transformations of early urban societies in Mesoamerica, Mesopotamia, Egypt and the Andean region.

Some of her more notable works are the Alfonso Caso Award winners 'Anatomía de un conjunto residencial teotihuacano en Oztoyahualco' from 1993 (as editor) and 'Estudios arqueométricos del centro de barrio de Teopancazco en Teotihuacan' from 2012.

Other works are 'La constitución de la sociedad urbana en Mesopotamia: un proceso en la historia' (1986), 'Akapana. Una pirámide en el centro del mundo' (1992), 'Teotihuacan: ciudad excepcional de Mesoamérica' (2017), 'El uso de los recursos naturales en un centro de barrio de Teotihuacan: Teopancazco' (2017), 'El Palacio de Xalla en Teotihuacan: primer acercamiento' (2019), 'Las sedes del poder en Mesoamérica' (as editor) (2021), 'El inframundo de Teotihuacan' (2023) and 'Teotihuacan in Central Mexico: an exceptional megalopolis' (2023).

== Awards ==
- 1990: Mexican Academy of Sciences Award
- 1994 and 2013: Alfonso Caso Award (Instituto Nacional de Antropología e Historia) for best research in Archeology for the book 'Estudios arqueométricos del centro de barrio de Teopancazco en Teotihuacan'
- 1999: Presidential Award of the Society for American Archaeology
- 2003: National University of Mexico Award for Social Sciences research
- 2003: 'Woman of the year' in Mexico
- 2010: Honorary doctor degree by the National Autonomous University of Mexico
- 2011: Juchimán de Plata Award
- 2013: Coatlicue Award
- 2015: Shanghai Archaeology Forum Award for her interdisciplinary research on the multiethnic population of the neighborhood center of Teopancazco in Teotihuacan.
- 2016: Crónica Award (Spanish: Premio Crónica)
- 2017: Anahuac Medal in Social Sciences, Philosophy and Literature
- 2018: Lifetime career recognition from the Autonomous University of Campeche at the XXVIII Meeting of Mayan Culture researchers.
- 2019: Honorary doctor degree by the San Cristóbal of Huamanga University
- 2021: International Archeology Award from the Iberoamerican Archeology (Spanish: Arqueología Iberoamericana) magazine.
