= Frizzi =

Frizzi is a surname of Italian origin. Notable people with the surname include:

- Ángeles Romero Frizzi (1946–2026), Mexican historian
- Fabrizio Frizzi (1958–2018), Italian television presenter and voice actor
- Fabio Frizzi (born 1951), Italian musician and composer
