= Ángeles Romero Frizzi =

Mexican historian (1946–2026)

- Born: 22 June 1946; Mexico City, Mexico
- Died: 25 April 2026 (aged 79)
- Occupation: Ethnologist
- Spouse: Manuel Esparza
- Awards: Guggenheim Fellowship (1988); Member of the Academia Mexicana de la Historia (1999)

Academic background
- Education: National School of Anthropology and History (maestría); Universidad Iberoamericana (PhD)

Academic work
- Sub-discipline: Mixtec people; Oaxaca
- Institutions: Centro Instituto Nacional de Antropología e Historia Oaxaca

María de los Ángeles Romero Frizzi (22 June 1946 – 25 April 2026) was a Mexican historian and ethnologist who wrote several books about the Mixtec people and Oaxaca, including El sol y la cruz (1996). She was a researcher at the Centro Instituto Nacional de Antropología e Historia Oaxaca for four decades and was a 1988 Guggenheim Fellow. She was elected to the Academia Mexicana de la Historia in 1999.

== Biography ==
María de los Ángeles Romero Frizzi born on 22 June 1946 in Mexico City. in addition to brief periods in Guadalajara and Puebla, she was raised in her birthplace. She graduated from the National School of Anthropology and History (ENAH), where she obtained a maestría in the early 1970s. (Note: Sources dispute when the degree was conferred - 1971, 1972, or 1973 - as well as on whether the degree is in anthropology or ethnology.) Her master thesis was titled La industria Textil novohispana (lit. "The Textile Industry of New Spain"). She also worked as a research assistant for the National Tourism Council and the Instituto Nacional de Antropología e Historia (INAH).

Following her graduation from ENAH, she became interested in Oaxaca's cultural diversity after being assigned to designing a project for the Museo de las Culturas de Oaxaca. In the early 1970s, (Note: Sources differ on whether the exact year was 1972 or 1973.) she joined Centro INAH Oaxaca; she started as an ethnographer at INAH, before being promoted to research professor in 1975. In 1985, with the help of Ángel Palerm, she obtained a PhD in social sciences at the Universidad Iberoamericana; her doctoral dissertation was about 16th/17th century colonial trade in the Mixteca Alta, particularly the Mixtec people's active role in it. In 2012, she retired from INAH Oaxaca as emeritus researcher.

In 1985, she became a Consejo Nacional de Humanidades, Ciencias y Tecnologías (CONAHCYT) Level I National Researcher, she was promoted to Level II in 1991. She was a visiting professor at El Colegio de México (1986) and the Benito Juárez Autonomous University of Oaxaca (1986–1987). She also worked as an academic coordinator for local units of other institutions, more specifically the University of Pennsylvania (1992–1997) and Centro de Investigaciones y Estudios Superiores en Antropología Social (1993–1994).

She wrote and edited several books – Economía y vida de los españoles en la Mixteca Alta: 1519–1720 (1990; lit. "Economy and Life of the Spaniards in the Mixteca Alta: 1519–1720"), El sol y la cruz: Historia de los Pueblos Indígenas de Oaxaca (1996; lit. "The Sun and the Cross: History of the Indigenous Peoples of Oaxaca"), Escritura zapoteca, 2000 años de antigüedad (lit. "Zapotec Writing: 2,000 Years Old"), Escribir para dos mundos: testimonios y experiencias de los escritores mixtecos (lit. "Writing for Two Worlds: Testimonies and Experiences of Mixtec Writers") – and co-authored textbooks for primary and secondary education. In 1988, she was awarded a Guggenheim Fellowship "for a study of acculturation and conquest in 16th-century Oaxaca". On 9 November 1999, she was admitted to the Academia Mexicana de la Historia's chair 23.

She was married to Manuel Esparza.

She died on 25 April 2026. Following her death, she received tributes from the INAH and its Oaxaca division, Seculta, and the Fundación Alfredo Harp Helú Oaxaca.

== Works ==
- Economía y vida de los españoles en la Mixteca Alta: 1519–1720 (1990)
- El sol y la cruz: Los pueblos indios de Oaxaca colonial (1996) (Note: Reviews of this book:)
- (ed.) Escritura zapoteca, 2000 años de antigüedad
- Escribir para dos mundos: testimonios y experiencias de los escritores mixtecos
