= Eduardo Matos Moctezuma =

Mexican archaeologist (born 1940)

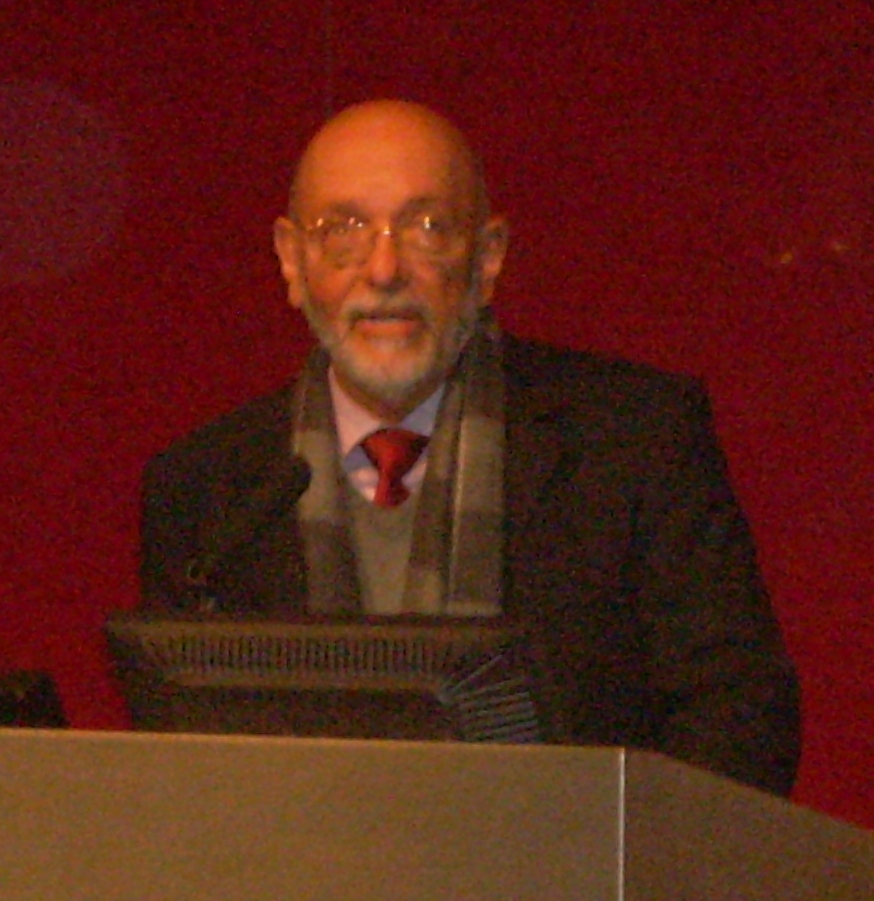
- Eduardo Matos Moctezuma speaking at the British Museum in September 2009
- Born: December 11, 1940 (age 85); Mexico City, Mexico
- Citizenship: Mexico; Dominican Republic
- Education: National School of Anthropology and History; National Autonomous University of Mexico
- Known for: Templo Mayor
- Awards: National Prize for Arts and Sciences; Princess of Asturias Awards
- Scientific career
- Fields: Archeology; Anthropology
- Workplaces: National School of Anthropology and History; National Museum of Anthropology

Eduardo Matos Moctezuma (born December 11, 1940) is a Mexican archaeologist of Dominican descent. From 1978 to 1982 he directed excavations at the Templo Mayor, the remains of a major Aztec pyramid in central Mexico City.

His father was a Dominican Republic diplomat that served in Panama, Venezuela and Mexico.

Matos Moctezuma graduated with a master's degree in archaeology from the National School of Anthropology and History and a master's degree in anthropology from the National Autonomous University of Mexico. He has excavated at archaeological sites in both the Maya area and in central Mexico. In addition to the Templo Mayor project, Matos has directed major fieldwork projects at the sites of Tula and Teotihuacan. He has also made important contributions to the study of the history of archaeology in Mexico.

Matos Moctezuma was director of the Templo Mayor project from 1978 to 1982, one of the most important archaeological projects in the world. Several seasons of excavations uncovered the construction history of this central temple of the Aztec Empire, where numerous artefacts were unearthed, overturning scholarly understanding of Aztec religion, empire, and ideology. Matos Moctezuma oversaw the creation of the Templo Mayor Museum in which these spectacular finds are displayed, and he directed the Museum for many years. 1987 saw the creation of the Urban Archaeology Program (directed by Matos) in which excavations in downtown Mexico City were expanded beyond the immediate site of the Templo Mayor. This research continues today.

Eduardo Matos Moctezuma has published nearly 500 works during his career. His books include technical archaeological reports, interpretive works on archaeological finds, scholarly studies in the history of archaeology, exhibition catalogs, and collections of chapters. In addition to his work at the Templo Mayor and its museum, Matos Moctezuma has held many important posts in the field of Mexican archaeology. For the National Institute of Anthropology and History, he has directed the Department of Pre-Hispanic Monuments, the Archaeology Council, and the National Museum of Anthropology and History. He has also worked to explain archaeology and Aztec civilization to the public through lectures, writings, and museum exhibits, and was an interviewee for the Harvard Gazette in 2018 on the topic of ancient Aztec religion.

Professor Matos has received many honors and awards, both in Mexico and in other countries. The most notable is election to the Colegio Nacional, a prestigious group of the top scholars and artists in Mexico. He has been distinguished as a Chevalier dans l'Ordre des Palmes Académiques, Chevalier de l'Ordre National du Mérite and given the Ordre des Arts et des Lettres by the Government of France. He has also received Venezuela's Andrés Bello Award, Harvard University's Henry B. Nicholson Medal and an honorary doctorate in science by the University of Colorado. He is also a member of the German Archaeological Institute, the Archaeological Institute of America, the Mexican Society of Geography and Statistics, the Mexican Academy of History and many other professional organizations. He was awarded the National Science and Arts Prize in 2007. In 2017, the Eduardo Matos Moctezuma Lecture Series at Harvard University were announced. In 2022 he was awarded the Princess of Asturias Award in the category "Social Sciences".

== Major publications ==
- Matos Moctezuma, Eduardo (1988) The Great Temple of the Aztecs. Thames and Hudson, New York.
- Matos Moctezuma, Eduardo (1995) Life and Death in the Templo Mayor. Translated by Bernard R. Ortiz de Montellano and Thelma Ortiz de Montellano. University Press of Colorado, Boulder.
- Matos Moctezuma, Eduardo (editor) (1999) Excavaciones en la catedral y el sagrario metropolitanos: programa de arqueología urbana. Instituto Nacional de Antropología e Historia, Mexico City.
- Matos Moctezuma, Eduardo (1999–2005) Estudios mexicas. 5 vols. El Colegio Nacional, Mexico City.
- Matos Moctezuma, Eduardo and Felipe Solis (2005) The Aztec Calendar and Other Solar Monuments. Grupo Azabache, Mexico City.
- Matos Moctezuma, Eduardo and Felipe R. Solís Olguín (editors) (2002) Aztecs. Royal Academy of Arts, London.
- Matos Moctezuma, Eduardo and Leonardo López Luján (2012) Escultura monumental mexica. Fondo de Cultura Económica. Mexico City.
