= Rastrojón =

Deng Mai Deng

Rastrojón is a Maya archaeological site in western Honduras. It appears to be associated with the major Classical period city of Copán―the capital of a Maya kingdom that existed from 5th to 9th centuries CE―situated just two kilometres away.

== History ==
El Rastrojón site was built under the concept of a residential area for the elite as retirement homes. The rubble shows the enormity of the palaces in the area, showing that the owners were part of the Mayan nobility and high society.

The site was abandoned following the collapse of the Copán kingdom in 822; the site was constructed on top of a geological fault that made building difficult, so it may be that the inhabitants judged the location not worth the effort after the fall of the nearby royal centre.

Rastrojón was discovered in 1979, during a survey of the area around Copán. From 2007 to 2013, the Rastrojón Archaeological Project (Spanish: El Proyecto Arqueológico Rastrojón Copán, PARACOPAN), sponsored by Harvard University and the Honduran Institute of Anthropology and History undertook a programme of rescue archaeology and conservation at the site.

The project was led by archaeologists William Fash and Jorge Ramos, and conservator Antonia Martínez, and resulted in the site being turned into a protected archaeological park.

== See also ==
- El Puente
- Maya society
