= El sol y la cruz =

1996 book by Ángeles Romero Frizzi

- Author: Ángeles Romero Frizzi
- Language: Spanish
- Series: Historia de los pueblos indígenas de México
- Genre: History, general audience
- Published: 1996
- Publisher: National Institute of Indigenous Peoples
- Pages: 291
- ISBN: 9684963114

El sol y la cruz: los pueblos indios de Oaxaca colonial ('The sun and the cross: the Indian peoples of colonial Oaxaca') is a 1996 popular history book written by Ángeles Romero Frizzi. Part of the Historia de los pueblos indígenas de México series published by the National Institute of Indigenous Peoples (INPI), El sol y la cruz discusses the history of the Indigenous peoples of Oaxaca before and during the colonial era. It received praise for its handling of the subject, but received some criticism for gaps in content and formatting.

== Contents ==
Published as part of the National Institute of Indigenous Peoples's Historia de los pueblos indígenas de México series, El sol y la cruz is a general audience book about the history of the Indigenous peoples of the state of Oaxaca. It is divided into eight chapters; the first two summarize Oaxaca and its precolonial history, while the next two are about Oaxaca and its Indigenous peoples during the colonial conquests. The next four are about Indigenous peoples' role in the economy, the challenges Indigenous peoples faced in the 17th-century, the presence of violent resistance, and the final century of the colonial era, respectively. There is also an appendix of seventeen document transcriptions sourced from archives. The title is inspired by a Zapotec mythological story which describes the arrival of the Spanish colonists "in terms of a sun and a cross".

In addition to discussing the Mixtec and Zapotec, the book's research relies on original content centered on other ethnicities – Chocho, Mixe, Triqui – and expands on the author's existing research on colonial history. Kevin Terraciano noted that the book was "an admirable attempt at a comparative native history of the entire region", in contrast to narrower focuses on one smaller region or cultural group. According to John K. Chance, the author aimed to provide an Indigenous perspective of Oaxacan history instead of a perceivedly-biased Spanish view, and her decision to "emphasize her own extensive (and unpublished) research in several Mixtec and Zapotec regions of the state" contrasted the usual approach of synthesizing existing published research; Terraciano expanded on the former that "as a citizen of Oaxaca, one of Mexico's most indigenous states, the author is prone to reflect on how the present proceeds from the past".

== Publication and reception ==
Written by Ángeles Romero Frizzi, El sol y la cruz was published by the National Institute of Indigenous Peoples in 1996. In the three decades prior to this, the academic sphere placed considerable attention on colonial Oaxaca, with the author herself, according to Chance, being considered a major part. The book has 291 pages.

Chance described El sol y la cruz as "a valuable introduction to colonial Indian Oaxaca for the general reader. There is nothing else like it in any language. ... Specialists will hunger for more, but they will appreciate the fresh point of view this work brings to Oaxacan ethnohistory". Terraciano praised it as "a balanced and well-written examination of change as both transformation and process, sensitive to the far-reaching upheavals and injustices confronting native peoples in the colonial period and beyond, but also keen to native agency". Writing for Sucedió en Oaxaca, Juan Manuel Herrera retrospectively called the book "a luminous gem of enduring value".

However, some of the book's aspects were criticized. Chance found a lack of engagement in existing issues surrounding the topic's historiography, as well as that few subjects were given considerable depth for the field's specialists. Terraciano criticized the paltry table of contents and lack of an index, though he stated that the work's shallow depth on complex issues was due to its reliance on research synthesis.
