= Alfredo López Austin =

Mexican historian (1936–2021)

Alfredo Federico López Austin (March 12, 1936 – October 15, 2021) was a Mexican historian who wrote extensively on the Aztec worldview and on Mesoamerican religion. As an academic teacher, he inspired generations of students, but his influence extends beyond the boundaries of academic life. His sons are Alfredo Xallápil López Luján, well known biologist and informatic and the renowned archaeologist, Leonardo Náuhmitl López Luján.

López Austin was born in Ciudad Juárez, México. He attended law school and worked as a lawyer in his hometown. His academic association with the Universidad Nacional Autónoma de México (UNAM, Mexico's autonomous national university), where he was a student, spans some fifty years, and as of 2007 he still held a position as a researcher (emeritus) at UNAM's Instituto de Investigaciones Antropológicas (IIA, or Institute of Anthropological Research). López Austin lectured in the History department of UNAM's Faculty of Philosophy and Literature, the Facultad de Filosofía y Letras (FFyL).

In 2020, López Austin won the National Prize for Arts and Sciences in Fine Arts.

== Bibliography ==
Books

- Los personajes del mito (2020)
- Cosmogonía y geometría cósmica en Mesoamérica (2018)
- Juego de tiempos (2018)
- La cosmovisión de la tradición mesoamericana, Tercera parte (2016)
- La cosmovisión de la tradición mesoamericana, Segunda parte (2016)
- La cosmovisión de la tradición mesoamericana, Primera parte (2016)
- Calpulli. Mitología de Mesoamérica (2013)
- Monte sagrado – Templo Mayor. El Cerro y la pirámide en la tradición religiosa mesoamericana, written with Leonardo López Luján (2009)
- Dioses del Norte, dioses del Sur. Religiones y cosmovisión en Mesoamérica y los Andes, written with Luis Millones (2008)
- Mito y realidad de Zuyuá. Serpiente Emplumada y las transformaciones mesomericanas del Clásico al Posclásico, written with Leonardo López Luján (1999)
- Un día en la vida de una partera mexica (1999)
- Breve historia de la tradición religiosa mesoamericana (1999)
- El pasado indígena, written with Leonardo López Luján (1996)
- Tamoanchan y Tlalocan (1994)
- El conejo en la cara de la Luna. Ensayos sobre mitología de la tradición mesoamericana (1994)
- Los mitos del tlacuache. Caminos de la mitología mesoamericana (1990)
- Teotihuacan, written with Carlos Martínez Marín and José Rubén Romero Galván (1989)
- Una vieja historia de la mierda (1988)
- La educación de los antiguos nahuas (1985)
- Guía de estudio México Prehispánico, written with Dúrdica Ségota Tómac (1984)
- Tarascos y mexicas (1981)
- Cuerpo humano e ideología. Las concepciones de los antiguos nahuas (1980)
- Un recorrido por la historia de México, written with Edmundo O’Gorman and Josefina Vázquez de Knaut (1975)
- Hombre-dios. Religión y política en El Mundo náhuatl (1973)
- Textos de medicina náhuatl (1971)
- Augurios y abusiones (1969)
- Juegos rituales aztecas (1967)
- La literatura de los guaraníes, written with León Cadogan (1965)
- La constitución real de México-Tenochtitlan (1961)

Edited books

- Cuernos y colas. Reflexiones en torno al Demonio en los Andes y en Mesoamérica, edited with Luis Millones (2013)
- Animales de Dios, edited with Luis Millones (2012)
- El modelo en la ciencia y en la cultura (2005)
- La cultura plural. Reflexiones sobre diálogos y silencios en Mesoamérica. Homenaje a Italo Signorini, edited with Alessandro Lupo (1998)
- De hombres y dioses, edited with Xavier Noguez (1997)
- Origen y formación del estado en Mesoamérica, edited with Andrés Medina and Mari Carmen Serra (1986)
- Fray Bernardino de Sahagún, Historia general de las cosas de Nueva España, edited with Josefina García Quintana (1982)
- Rafael Sandoval, Arte de la lengua mexicana (1965)
