= William Fash =

American anthropologist (born 1954)

William L. Fash, Jr. (born 1954) is an American anthropologist who is the Bowditch Professor of Central American and Mexican Archaeology and Ethnology at Harvard. In 2008, he was given the Hoja de Laurel de Oro by the Government of Honduras for 30-plus years of "preserving and documenting Honduras' cultural heritage." He is corresponding fellow of the Academia Mexicana de la Historia since March 2017.

== Early life and education ==
In 1975, Fash excavated at Grasshopper, Cibecue, Arizona as a student in a summer field school. He received his B.A. in anthropology from the University of Illinois Urbana-Champaign in 1976. That same year he received a National Science Foundation Graduate Fellowship for the research he would do at Harvard, from which he graduated with a Ph.D. in 1983.

== Archaeological excavations ==
Besides his participation at the Grasshopper Site, Fash has participated in many excavations at Copan, some of those span several years and involve multiple researchers. Often, he was the director of these excavations. He first worked in Chalcatzingo, Mexico in 1974 and again at the same site in 1976, it would be 24 years before he worked at a site in Mexico again. Below are some of the excavations he participated in:

Proyecto Arqueologico Copan – Hw had four different positions during this project over seven years. He worked as an archaeologist, Director of Settlement Surveys and Excavations, Excavations Director, and Research and Museums Consultant.

Copan Temples Project – He began work on this project the same year as the Copan Mosaics Project, it functioned as an international field school. He directed it for four years (1985–1990).

Copan Mosaics Project (1985–present) – He initiated (with Barbara Fash and Rudy Larios) and directs this project, which started in 1985 but is currently unfinished. In 1987, Fash was awarded a Fulbright Senior Research Fellowship for this project, whose purpose is "to record and protect Copan’s hundreds of stone mosaic sculptures." To give an idea of the extent of the project, involves all of Copan's Principle group and preservation of its Hieroglyphic Stairway.

Copan Acropolis Archaeological Project (1988–1997) – He directed this project for 8 years (1988–1996), it involved the excavation of temples, courts, and tombs at Copan. Like the Copan Mosaics Project, this project also aided the architectural sculpture cataloguing process. Other researchers that assisted this project include Robert Sharer and Ricardo Agurcia Fasquelle.

Harvard Field School in Maya Archaeology at Copan, Honduras – He directed this project for 6 years.

From 2000 to 2003 he co-directed Xalla Palace Project at Teotihuacan, Mexico, with Leonardo López Luján and Linda Manzanilla.

From 2007 to 2013 He directed the Rastrojón Archaeological Project (Spanish: El Proyecto Arqueológico Rastrojón Copán, PARACOPAN), a programme of Rescue archaeology and conservation at Rastrojón, a Classical Maya site close to Copán.

He has been awarded the highest civilian honor of the Government of Honduras, The Order of Jose Cecilio del Valle.

== Conservation ==
Fash was the Executive Director for The Anthropology Museum at Northern Illinois University from 1987–1992, and is the Director of the Peabody Museum at Harvard. He has also participated in several Museum exhibits and conservation efforts. He served as Interim Director of The Programa Integral de Conservacion del Parque Archeologico Copan, one of the conservation efforts that involve the participation of several organizations including the Honduran Institute of Anthropology and History, Harvard University, the Getty Conservation Institute, and UNESCO.
