= Charles H. Long =

American cultural historian, religious studies scholar, and essayist

Charles Houston Long (August 23, 1926 – February 12, 2020) was an African-American cultural historian, religious studies scholar, and essayist in the areas of religion, theology, philosophy and studies of modernity. He was a faculty member at the University of Chicago, UNC Chapel Hill, Syracuse University, Duke University, and UC Santa Barbara. His work built on Ferdinand de Saussure's semiotics. Significations in particular is about how the West gets to make meaning about other cultures, but those cultures don't get the opportunity to make meaning about themselves.

== Life, education, and teaching career ==
Long was born in Little Rock, Arkansas, on August 23, 1926, to Samuel Preston Long and Geneva (Thompson) Long. He grew up as the seventh of nine children with his father being an ordained Baptist minister. He graduated from Dunbar Junior College in 1947 after spending almost two years in the United States Army Air Force. He then continued to the University of Chicago where he received a Bachelor of Divinity in 1953 and a Doctor of Philosophy in 1962. He was named Doctor of Humane Letters by Dickinson College in 1971.

Long served as an assistant dean at the University of Chicago while completing his doctorate. After completing his doctorate, he was officially appointed as a faculty member of the Divinity School at the University of Chicago. He subsequently served as chair of the History of Religions Field and of the Committee on African Studies at the University of Chicago. After his time at the University of Chicago, Long went on to teach at the University of North Carolina at Chapel Hill, Duke University, the University of California, Santa Barbara, and Syracuse University.

He died in North Carolina on February 12, 2020.

== Achievement and accolades ==
- President of the American Academy of Religion (1973)
- President of the Society for the Study of Black Religion (1986-1989)
- University of Chicago Divinity School's Alumni of the Year (1984)
- Guggenheim Fellow (1997)

== Significations ==
In his work, Significations: Signs, Symbols and Images in the Interpretation of Religion, Long points out two issues regarding the ambiguity of religion in the modern United States. First, the Enlightenment in Europe prioritized universal, hierarchical and communal ways to understand the world. Second, the Western conception of religion, born in the Enlightenment, has been shaped and reinforced by colonialism, conquest, and the idea of a non-Western "Other". Considering this, Long raises the question of whether religion can be defined universally, given the diversity of observed religious phenomena around the world.

According to Long, the Enlightenment, while attempting to be objective, had some glaring blind spots. Long states, "While the reformist structure of the Enlightenment had mounted a polemic against the divisive meaning of religion in Western culture and set forth alternate meanings for the understanding of the human, the same ideological structures through various intellectual strategies paved the ground for historical evolutionary thinking, racial theories, and forms of color symbolism that made the economic and military conquest of various cultures and peoples justifiable and defensible". Religious scholars attempted empirical methodology based on Enlightenment principles of rationality but worked from upper-class, white, cisgender, heterosexual, male assumptions, which also implicitly located other peoples and religions as inferior. Humanistic religious studies were a double-edged sword–they allowed for new ways of understanding religious traditions that had been a controlling and violent force in Europe, but they also provided a framework for thinking which justified the racist exploitation of colonialism.

Long also explores the role of symbols in religious life and the process of signification. He begins with two epigraphs: first, Ferdinand de Saussure's statement that the "bond between the signifier and the signified is arbitrary"; and second, an "Afro-American colloquial expression: Signifying is worse than lying". The epigraphs bring together central themes in Long's work: the power relationship between those who control language; and the negotiations between those who are signified and those who signify. "For the majority culture of this country, blacks have always been signified". A "sign" in linguistics is something that communicates meaning outside of the sign itself. For example, when a red octagon communicates the meaning "stop," the signifier is the object (red octagon), and the signified is the meaning (stop). Long points to black communities as an example of how minoritized communities can work to "form new and different relationships within a discourse that was already taking place". At the same time, Long points out that his community, the black community, "was a community signified by another community," and that this reinforced a "subordinate relationship of power". Religious symbols, Long argues, have an arbitrary bond to their meaning. This means that these symbols must be studied at the level of signification. It is not enough to study the surface level of religion–the study of religion should exist on a level that takes into account how the religion becomes a sign (literally, sign-ification). Long points to the Enlightenment as the time in which "religion and cultures and peoples throughout the world were created anew through academic disciplinary orientations–they were signified".

Long also uses Black communities in the United States as an example of the effects of Enlightenment and colonial religious definition. Long distinguishes between those who have the power to shape signification about others, and those who are the objects of that signification" (the "signified"). He suggests that black people in the US have been subject to "the same structures of cultural categories that create the categories of the primitives and colonized people of the contemporary world." Such communities have an "extensive literature… about them, most of it written and presided over by others". Such language functions to uphold the status quo and the primacy of white Western culture: "it exists primarily to keep the others in their place." He describes how Black communities' criticism of the United States cultural system reflects both an internalizing and rejection of Western Enlightenment ideas. In one sense, they are criticizing it for not living up to its own ideals, which shows that they have internalized its ideals as something to be valued. But on the other hand, because the power systems of the United States have been built to oppress Black people, they have a uniquely critical position of radical Otherness. Ultimately, colonialism is baked into the language and knowledge of the enlightenment era, making knowledge and colonialism interdependent. This makes it difficult for participants in a colonized culture to denatualize colonial sentiments. In other words, they must deconstruct their own thought structure to reveal colonial thought, which is required to reconstruct it. Long states, "The situation of the cultures of black peoples in the United States afforded a religious experience of radical otherness, a resourceful and critical moment that allowed these communities to undertake radical internal criticisms of themselves, their situation, and the situation of the majority culture."

Long continues to discuss signification in how "primitive" cultures are referenced. "Other terms have been forthcoming to replace the term "primitive" - non civilized, non literate, cold cultures, and so on. These changes will not suffice, for the cultural language of civilization that brought forth the structure of the primitive has not changed." Since relationship between the signifier and the signified is arbitrary, changing the term used in reference to a culture that has been "othered" doesn't change the implied inferiority from the point of view of the group in power.

== Role of colonization ==
The category of "religion" was invented during the Enlightenment. Long claims that the creation of the category of religion was a result of colonization in efforts to deem the "other" people and culture as inferior outsiders. Long believes that this provides a new way to label and identify people and provides another way to reinforce the idea that the West is superior. In order to create these labels, "forms of evolutionary thinking… re-named and re-created 'others' within languages and categories that the colonizers could understand in a nefarious process of translation". This additionally "signaled the beginning of a 'necessary lie' that framed Europeans as superior in relation to a primitive 'other'. According to the West, the "primitives" are understood as both religious and empirical "others" as their actions differ from those in the West and are thus seen as deviating from the normal. Long explains how describing the "primitives" as "others" provides a significance to the West by offering a civilization that can be contrasted to Western norms. These differences reinforce the idea that "the primitives operate as a negative structure of concreteness that allows civilization to define itself as a structure superior to this ill-defined and inferior 'other'." These perceptions of non-Western cultures and religion as "primitive" were normalized in European society not only among academics, but the general populous as well. To this effect, a change in nomenclature when referring to such groups, Long explains, is ineffective unless it uproots the normalized view of such cultures.

=== Cargo cults ===
The term cargo cult was first coined by anthropologists studying South Pacific Island civilizations in the late nineteenth century. When these "primitive" civilizations engaged in international trade with Western societies, modern technology and cultural imperialism were just some developments that had not made it to their communities yet. Thus, as technology that allowed for efficient manufacturing processes was largely unknown to them, cargo cults were centered around the idea that the mass availability of goods and services was made possible through spiritual means. The central belief system of cargo cults was based on a fundamental misunderstanding of Western culture: they believed that these societies with an abundance of goods obtained them through deceit, malice, or even by mistake. Some argued that, within this trade relationship, cargo cults were "portrayed as primitive peoples suffering from a grave misunderstanding of their role in systems of mass production, resource distribution, and Western commodity fetishism". Long disagreed; he believed that this depiction of these societies was "paternalistic and patronizing". He argued that "these groups provide a unique and alternate meaning of human freedom in the modern world. Their traditions demythologized through contact with the modern world, the cult prophets undertake a new quest for a world of sacred meaning". The significance of building and sustaining new social relationships is paramount here. Global colonialism, perceived through this lens (with a focal point centered on the relationship between cargo cults and western societies in the late nineteenth century), suggested that societies could and should find equilibrium to create new social relationships. Long recentered the indigenous experience in his interpretation of cargo cults. "On the one hand, the members of the indigenous cultures must positively undergo their domination on the historical level, but on the other hand they actively participate in and think through the meaning of this historical domination in mythical modes".

== Selected publications ==
- Long, Charles H. (1974). Cargo cults as cultural historical phenomena.
- Long, Charles H. (1980). "The Liberation of the Chinese Church: a Memoir of the Revolution from a Missionary Point of View". Historical Magazine of the Protestant Episcopal Church. Vol. 49.
- Long, Charles H. (1980). The Study of Religion: Its Nature and Its Discourse. University of Colorado.
- Long, Charles H. (1982). Forward Year by Year: The Story of the Forward Movement. Forward Movement Publications.
- Long, Charles H. (1985). Significations: Experiences and Images in Black American Religion. Seabury Press. ISBN 9780866839563.
- Long, Charles H. (1993). The Gift of Speech and the Travail of Language. University of Cape Town. ISBN 9780799215359.
- Long, Charles H. (1983). Alpha: The Myths of Creation. Scholars Press. ISBN 9780891306047.
- Long, Charles H. (1999). Significations: Signs, Symbols, and Images in the Interpretation of Religion. Davies Group. ISBN 9781888570519.
- Long, Charles H. (2018). Charles H. Long (ed.). Ellipsis : The Collected Writings of Charles H. Long. Bloomsbury Publishing. ISBN 9781350032651.
