= Elizabeth Hill Boone =

American art historian

- Born: September 6, 1948 (age 77)
- Education: The College of William & Mary (BA 1970); UT Austin (MA 1974, PhD 1977)
- Known for: interpretations of Aztec iconography, codices and writing
- Awards: Order of the Aztec Eagle (1990)
- Scientific career
- Fields: Mesoamerican art historian
- Workplaces: Dumbarton Oaks; Tulane University

Elizabeth Hill Boone (born September 6, 1948) is an American art historian, ethnohistorian and academic, specializing in the study of Latin American art and in particular the early colonial and pre-Columbian art, iconography and pictorial codices associated with the Mixtec, Aztec and other Mesoamerican cultures in the central Mexican region. Her extensive published research covers investigations into the nature of Aztec writing, the symbolism and structure of Aztec art and iconography and the interpretation of Mixtec and Aztec codices.

Boone has been a professor of art history at Tulane University since 1994–95, holding the Martha and Donald Robertson Chair in Latin American Art. She is also a research associate at Tulane's Middle American Research Institute (MARI). From 2006 Boone took a sabbatical from lecturing and research at Tulane, to accept a position to pursue independent research as the Andrew W. Mellon Professor at the National Gallery of Art's Center for Advanced Study in the Visual Arts (CASVA), an appointment lasting through 2008. Boone had previously been a Paul Mellon Senior Fellow at CASVA, in 1993–94.

== Academic career ==
Elizabeth Hill Boone commenced her undergraduate studies in fine arts at The College of William & Mary in Williamsburg, Virginia, obtaining a B.A. in 1970. She then studied art history at California State University, Northridge in 1971–72, and completed her postgraduate degrees at the University of Texas at Austin, obtaining an MA in 1974 and a PhD in pre-Columbian art history, which was awarded in 1977.

After receiving her PhD, Boone secured a research associate position at University of Texas at San Antonio's Research Center for the Arts, where she worked for three years. In 1980 Boone took up a position in pre-Columbian studies at the research institution she would be associated with for the next fifteen years, the Dumbarton Oaks Research Library and Collection located in Washington, D.C. Initially as associate curator (1980–83) and then as Director of Pre-Columbian Studies and Curator of the Pre-Columbian Collection (1983–95), Boone oversaw and held responsibility for Dumbarton Oaks' research and scholarship programs, symposia and colloquia, scheduled publications and the curatorship of the institution's libraries and collection of pre-Columbian artworks. From 2006 onwards Boone has retained a position as one of the six-member Board of Senior Fellows in pre-Columbian Studies at Dumbarton Oaks.

In 1995 Boone relocated to New Orleans, Louisiana to become professor of art history at Tulane University, where she teaches courses on Mesoamerican, Aztec and colonial-era art history, general art interpretation and theory, and continues to publish research papers and books in the field.

In 1990 Boone was awarded the Orden del Águila Azteca (Order of the Aztec Eagle), Mexico's highest decoration awarded to non-citizens.

During 2010 Boone served as president of the American Society for Ethnohistory.

Boone is corresponding fellow of the Academia Mexicana de la Historia.

== Published works ==
Boone's publications include:

authored books—

- Boone, Elizabeth Hill (1983). The Codex Magliabechiano and the Lost Prototype of the Magliabechiano Group. Berkeley & Los Angeles: University of California Press. ISBN 9780520045200.
- Boone, Elizabeth Hill (1989). Incarnations of the Aztec Supernatural: The Image of Huitzilopochtli in Mexico and Europe. Transactions of the American Philosophical Society, vol. 79 part 2. Philadelphia, PA: American Philosophical Society. ISBN 0-87169-792-0. OCLC 20141678.
- Boone, Elizabeth Hill (2000). Stories in Red and Black: Pictorial Histories of the Aztec and Mixtec. Austin: University of Texas Press. ISBN 0-292-70876-9. OCLC 40939882.
- Boone, Elizabeth Hill (2007). Cycles of Time and Meaning in the Mexican Books of Fate. Joe R. and Teresa Lozano Long series in Latin American and Latino art and culture. Austin: University of Texas Press. ISBN 978-0-292-71263-8. OCLC 71632174.

contributed chapters—

- Boone, Elizabeth Hill (1998). "Pictorial Documents and Visual Thinking in Postconquest Mexico" (PDF). In Elizabeth Hill Boone; Tom Cummins (eds.). Native Traditions in the Postconquest World, A Symposium at Dumbarton Oaks 2nd through 4th October 1992. Washington D.C.: Dumbarton Oaks Research Library and Collection. pp. 149–199. ISBN 0-88402-239-0. OCLC 34354931. Archived from the original (PDF Reprint) on September 27, 2007.
