= Universidad del Tepeyac =

The Universidad del Tepeyac is a university located north of Mexico City and was founded in 1975.

The school's American football team, the Frailes del Tepeyac, was created in 1990.
