= Academia Mexicana de la Historia =

National academy for promotion of historical studies in Mexico

The Academia Mexicana de la Historia (Mexican Academy of History, also known by the acronym AMH), is a national academy in Mexico, which promotes history in Mexico.

== History ==
While Antonio López de Santa Anna issued mandates to establish a Mexican national academy for history in 1835 and 1854, the first successful attempt to establish the academy began during the revolutionary period. Discussions began while Victoriano Huerta was still in power, the academia was finally established in 1919, after Venustiano Carranza assumed the presidency of Mexico.

The purpose of the academy is to promote historical studies within Mexico, conduct research into all aspects of the history of Mexico, and to contribute towards the preservation of the national cultural heritage. It is a correspondent academy to the Real Academia de la Historia in Madrid, the equivalent national academy of history in Spain.

The AMH was formally constituted on September 12, 1919, after several previous attempts to form such a body had not come to fruition. Originally the AMH was established with 24 positions or numbered chairs (sillones de número) for full members (académicos de número). In 1990 this number was increased to 30, made up of 22 members resident in Mexico City (miembros residentes) and 8 external members from the Mexican states (miembros foráneos). In addition, there are a number of correspondent members (corresponsales) from both within Mexico (corresponsales nacionales) and from other countries (corresponsales extranjeros).

== Members ==
- Josefina Muriel, 1993 (seat 27)
- Leonardo López Luján, 2010 (seat 27)
