= National School of Anthropology and History =

Mexican research institute

Coordinates: 19.3029°N 99.1795°W

- Escuela Nacional de Antropología e Historia
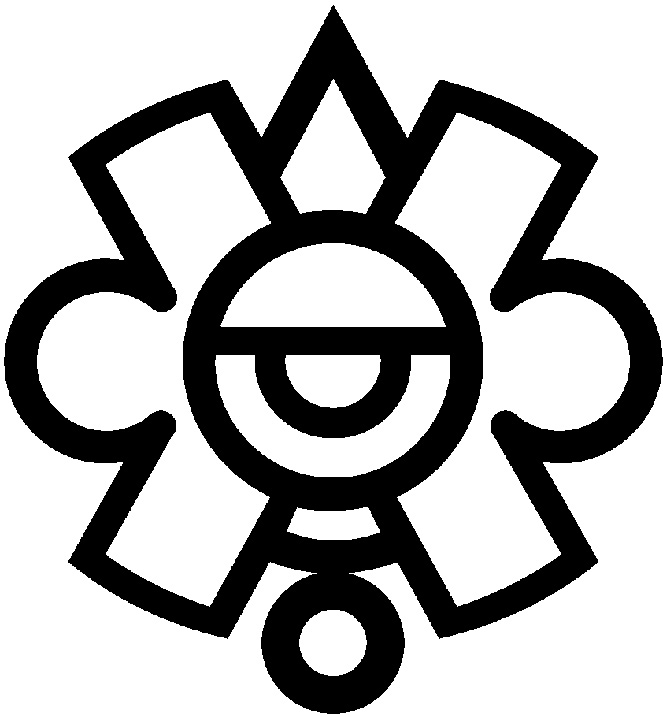
- National School of Anthropology and History
- Type: Public
- Established: 1938
- Parent institution: National Institute of Anthropology and History (INAH)
- Location: Mexico City, Mexico
- Campus: Urban
- Website: Official website

National School of Anthropology and History (in Spanish: Escuela Nacional de Antropología e Historia, ENAH) is a Mexican Institution of higher education founded in 1938 and a prominent center for the study of Anthropology and History in the Americas. It is part of Mexico's National Institute of Anthropology and History (INAH) and offers bachelor's and postgraduate degrees in Anthropology and its disciplines: Linguistics, Social Anthropology, Ethnology, Archaeology, Physical Anthropology, Ethnohistory and History.

== Alumni ==
- Arturo Montero, archaeologist who has discovered 53 sites with pre-Hispanic evidence in the high mountains of Mesoamerica
