= Iniesta (disambiguation) =

Iniesta is a Spanish surname.

Iniesta may also refer to:

- Iniesta, Cuenca, a municipality in Spain
- Castillejo de Iniesta, a municipality in Spain
- Graja de Iniesta, a municipality in Spain
- Iniesta (leafhopper), an insect genus in the tribe Dikraneurini
