= Nanotechnology education =

Learning and teaching related to nanotechnology

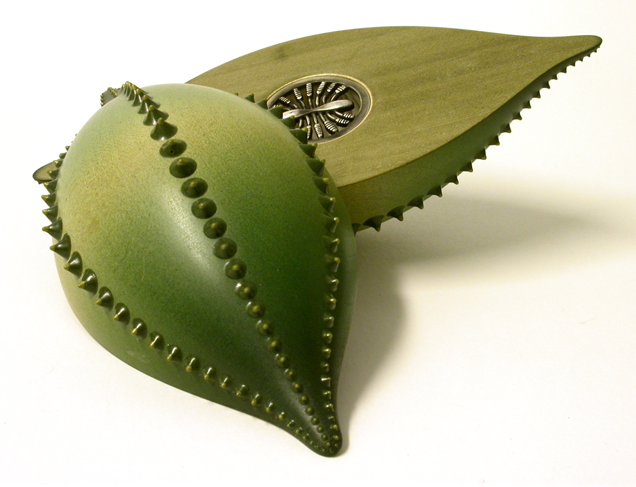
An artistic representation of a Navicula diatom, unicellular algae that creates micro- or nanoscale structures that are studied by nanotechnologists

Nanotechnology education involves a multidisciplinary natural science education with courses such as physics, chemistry, mathematics, and molecular biology.

Nanotechnology education involves the study of materials, devices, and systems at the nanoscale, typically defined as structures between 1 and 100 nanometers in size, where matter exhibits physical, chemical, and biological properties that differ from those of bulk materials. It is an interdisciplinary field, drawing on physics, chemistry, biology, materials science, and engineering, with degree programs typically structured to provide foundations across several of these disciplines before specializing in nanoscale phenomena and applications.

Programs are offered at universities worldwide at the bachelor's, master's, and doctoral levels, as well as through associate degree and certificate programs at community colleges and technical institutions.

The growth of formal nanotechnology education has been closely linked to government investment in nanoscience research. In the United States, the National Nanotechnology Initiative (NNI), established in 2000, designated education and workforce development as a core goal, with the National Science Foundation funding nanotechnology education programs at $21.5 million in fiscal year 2023 alone.

The first program involving nanotechnology was offered by the University of Toronto's Engineering Science program, where nanotechnology could be taken as an option. The University of Waterloo subsequently established a dedicated Bachelor of Applied Science in Nanotechnology Engineering, one of the first standalone undergraduate degrees in the field. In the United States, the College of Nanotechnology, Science, and Engineering at the University at Albany, SUNY, established in 2004, was the first college in the country devoted entirely to nanotechnology.

== Curriculum and pedagogy ==
Nanotechnology degree programs typically combine foundational coursework in quantum mechanics, surface science, nanomaterials, and nanoelectronics with specialized instruction in nanoscale fabrication and characterization techniques. Commonly taught laboratory methods include atomic force microscopy (AFM), scanning tunneling microscopy (STM), scanning electron microscopy (SEM), and transmission electron microscopy (TEM), which allow students to visualize and manipulate matter at the atomic scale. Access to cleanroom facilities is a defining feature of many university nanotechnology programs, as the fabrication of nanoscale devices requires controlled environments not typically available in conventional teaching laboratories.

A recurring challenge in curriculum design is the tension between breadth and depth. Because nanotechnology draws on physics, chemistry, biology, materials science, and engineering, programs must balance broad interdisciplinary foundations with the specialized knowledge required for research or industry roles. Considerable debate exists among educators about whether nanotechnology concepts are better delivered through dedicated standalone courses or by integrating nanoscale content into existing physics, chemistry, and engineering curricula. Coordinating faculty from different departments with differing disciplinary conventions presents a further pedagogical challenge documented in the literature.

Many programs incorporate problem-based learning, group projects, and industry partnerships to address the applied nature of the field. Modern nanotechnology curricula increasingly include components addressing the environmental, health, and safety (EHS) implications of nanomaterials, as well as the broader ethical, legal, and societal dimensions of the field – areas sometimes grouped under the heading ELSI (Ethical, Legal, and Societal Implications). The inclusion of such components has been linked to government funding requirements, with bodies such as the National Nanotechnology Initiative explicitly mandating attention to societal implications alongside technical research.

The expansion of MOOC (Massive Open Online Course) platforms from around 2012 extended access to nanotechnology instruction. Platforms including Coursera and edX have offered nanotechnology courses from institutions such as Duke University, Technion, and Northwestern University, covering topics ranging from nanofabrication and nanosensors to nanomaterials characterization. These online offerings have made introductory nanoscience content accessible to learners beyond institutional settings, though the hands-on laboratory component central to most degree programs cannot be fully replicated remotely.

Here is a partial list of universities offering nanotechnology education, and the degrees offered (Bachelor of Science, Master of Science, or PhD in Nanotechnology).

== Africa ==
=== Egypt ===
- Nile University - master's
- The American University in Cairo - master's
- Zewail City of Science and Technology - B.Sc
- Cairo University - Faculty of Engineering - Masters of Science

== Asia ==
=== Hong Kong ===
- Hong Kong University of Science and Technology - MPhil, PhD

=== India ===
- VIT University, Vellore, Center for Nanotechnology Research, M.Tech. in Nanotechnology
- Srinivas Institute of Technology, Mangaluru, Karnataka [Affiliated to VTU, Belagavi, Approved by AICTE] - B.E. Nano Technology
- Desh Bhagat School of Engineering, Mandi Gobindgarh, Punjab Desh Bhagat University - B.Tech & M.Tech with Nanotechnology
- Tezpur Central University, Napam, Tezpur (M.Sc & Ph.D in nanoscience and technology)
- Indian Institute of Science, Bangalore
- IITs - B.Tech & M.Tech with Nanotechnology
- Delhi Technological University (formerly DCE), Delhi - M.Tech
- NITs
- Central University of Jharkhand - Integrated M.Tech Nanotechnology
- Jamia Millia Islamia (a central university by an act of parliament), New Delhi - M.Tech (Nanotechnology) & Ph.D
- Sikkim Manipal Institute of Technology - M.Tech (Material Science and Nanotechnology, 2-year regular programme), Ph.D, Equipments: AFM, STM, HWCVD, TCVD
- Amity University, Noida, Uttar Pradesh B.Tech, M.Sc, M.Sc + M.Tech, M.Tech
- Jawaharlal Nehru Technological University, Kukatpally, Hyderabad, Telangana - M.Sc (Nanoscience & Technology) M.Tech (Nanotechnology) & Ph.D (Nano Science & Technology)
- Sam Higginbottom Institute of Agriculture, Technology and Sciences - Postgraduate diploma in nanotechnology.
- Jawaharlal Nehru Technological University College of Engineering Sultanpur, B.Tech in (Mechanical and NanoTechnology) Engineering.
- University of Madras, National Centre for Nanoscience and Nanotechnology, Chennai - M.Tech, M.Sc and PhD in Nanoscience and Nanotechnology
- University of Petroleum and Energy Studies, DEHRADUN-Uttarakhand, B.Tech - Material Science specialization in Nanotechnology
- Nanobeach, Delhi - Advanced Nanotechnology Programs
- SASTRA University, Thanjavur Tamil Nadu -M.Tech integrated in medical nanotechnology
- Nano Science and Technology Consortium, Delhi - Nanotechnology Programs
- Vels university, Chennai - M.Sc nanoscience
- Bhagwant University, ajmer Rajasthan - B.Tech - Nanotechnology engineering
- Maharaja Sayajirao University of Baroda, M.Sc Materials Science (Nanotechnology)
- National Institute of Technology Calicut - M.Tech and Ph.D
- SRM Institute of Science and Technology, Kattankulathur - B.Tech, M.S. (coursework, research), M.Tech and Ph.D
- Noorul Islam College of Engineering, Kumarakovil - M.Tech Nanotechnology
- Karunya University, Coimbatore - master's and Ph.D
- Anna University Chennai
- Andhra University, Visakhapatnam - M.Sc., M.Tech
- Sri Venkateswara University, Tirupathi - M.Sc, M.Tech
- Bharathiar University, Coimbatore - M.Sc Nanoscience and Technology (Based on Physics or Chemistry or Biotechnology), M.Phil and Ph.D
- Osmania University, Hyderabad - M.Sc., M.Tech
- Anna University Tiruchirappalli, Tamil Nadu - M.Tech (Nanoscience and Technology)
- Centre For Converging Technologies, University of Rajasthan, Jaipur - M.Tech (Nanotechnology And Nanomaterials)
- KSR College of Technology, Tiruchengode - M.Tech NanoScience and Technology
- Mepco-Schlenk Engineering College, Sivakasi - M.Tech Nanoscience and Technology
- Sarah Tucker college for Women (Affiliated with MS University, Tirunelveli) B.Sc Nanoscience
- Karunya University, Coimbatore-114 - Integrated M.Sc Nanoscience & Nanotechnology and M.Tech with Nanotechnology
- Acharya Nagarjuna University, Guntur - Integrated M.Sc Nanotechnology
- Indian Institute of Nano Science & TechnologyBangalore
- Sri Guru Granth Sahib World University Fatehgarh Sahib, Punjab
- Anna University, Coimbatore
- Mount Carmel College, Autonomous, Bangalore - M.Sc in Nanoscience and Technology (2-year course)

Important:

- AICTE New Delhi has added B.Tech & M.Tech Nanotechnology courses in the list of approved courses in the academic year 2011 – 2012
- North Maharashtra University JALGAON M.Tech in Nanoscience and Nanotechnology
- Department of Environmental Microbiology, Babasaheb Bhimrao Ambedkar Central University, Lucknow. M.Sc in Nanoscience and Nanotechnology,
- Amity Institute of Nanotechnology, Amity University, Noida [bachelor's and master's in Nanotechnology]
- School of Nanoscience and Technology, Shivaji University, Kolhapur-416004, Maharashtra State, India (B.Sc-M.Sc 5-year integrated Course)
- Department of Nanotechnology offers two year M.Sc. course in Nanotechnology, Dr. Babasaheb Ambedkar Marathwada University, Aurangabad-431004, Maharashtra State, India.

=== Iran ===
- Iran university of science & technology - master's
- Sharif University of Technology - master's, Ph.D
- Tarbiat Modares University - master's, Ph.D
- University of Tehran - master's, Ph.D
- Amirkabir University of Technology - master's
- University of Isfahan - master's
- Shiraz University - master's
- University of Sistan and Baluchestan - master's
- University of Kurdistan - master's
- Islamic Azad University of Marvdasht - master's

=== Israel ===
- Bar Ilan University Institute of Nanotechnology & Advanced Materials (BINA) - with research centers for materials, medicine, energy, magnetism, cleantech and photonics. M.Sc, Ph.D, youth programs.
- The Hebrew University of Jerusalem Center for Nanoscience and Nanotechnology - with units for nanocharecerization and nanofabrication. M.Sc, Ph.D
- Technion Russell Berrie Nanotechnology Institute (RBNI)- Over 110 faculty members from 14 departments. M.Sc, Ph.D
- Tel Aviv University Center for Nanoscience and Nanotechnology Interdisciplinary graduate program, marked by a large participation of students from the industry. M.Sc
- The Weizmann Institute of Science - has a research group in the Department of Science Teaching that build programs for introduction high school teachers and students to Nanotechnology.

=== Japan ===
- Tohoku University - bachelor's, master's, Ph.D
- Nagoya University - bachelor's, master's, Ph.D
- Kyushu University - master's, Ph.D
- Keio University - master's
- University of Tokyo - master's, Ph.D
- Tokyo Institute of Technology - master's, Ph.D
- Kyoto University - master's, Ph.D
- Waseda University - Ph.D
- Osaka University - master's, Ph.D
- University of Tsukuba -master's, Ph.D
- University of Electro-Communications - master's, Ph.D on Micro-Electronic

=== Kazakhstan ===
- Al-Farabi Kazakh National University - master's, Ph.D

=== Malaysia ===
- University Putra Malaysia - M.Sc and Ph.D programs in Nanomaterials and Nanotechnology UPM-Nano
- Malaysia Multimedia University - bachelor's degree in electronic engineering majoring in Nanotechnology (Nano-Engineering)
- Malaysia University of Science & Technology - B.Sc in Nanoscience & Nanoengineering with Business Management

=== Pakistan ===
- University of the Punjab, Lahore, Centre of Excellence in Solid State Physics, M.S./Ph.D Program in Nanotechnology
- Preston Institute Of Nanoscience And Technology (PINSAT), Islamabad, B.S. Nanoscience and Technology
- University of Engineering & Technology, Lahore, Introductory Short Courses
- Quaid-e-Azam University, Islamabad, master's degree research projects
- Pakistan Institute of Engineering and Applied Sciences (PIEAS), Islamabad, National Centre for Nanotechnology
- COMSATS Institute of Information Technology (CIIT), Islamabad, Center for Micro and Nano Devices
- National University of Science & Technology (NUST), Islamabad, M.S. and Ph.D Nanoscience & Engineering
- National Institute of Bio Genetic Engineering (NIGBE), Faisalabad, Research Projects
- Ghulam Ishaq Khan Institute of Engineering & Technology (GIKI), TOPI, KPK, master's/Ph.D degree program
- Baha-ud-din Zakaria University, Multan
- Government College University (GCU), Lahore
- University of Sind, Karachi
- Peshawar University, Peshawar
- International Islamic University Bachelor & Master of Science in Nanotechnology

=== Singapore ===
- National University of Singapore - B.Eng in Engineering Science with Nanoscience & Nanotechnology options, master's and PhD in Nanoscience and Nanotechnology Specialization

=== Sri Lanka ===
- Sri Lanka Institute of Nanotechnology (SLINTEC) - Ph.D & M.Phil

=== Thailand ===
- Chulalongkorn University - bachelor's degree in engineering (Nano-Engineering)
- Mahidol University - Center of Nanoscience and Nanotechnology - Master Program
- Kasetsart University - Center of Nanotechnology, Kasetsart University Research and Development Institute
- Center of Excellence in Nanotechnology at AIT - Center of Excellence in Nanotechnology - master's and Ph.D programs
- College of Nanotechnology at KMITL - bachelor's degree in engineering (Nanomaterials), M.Sc and Ph.D programa in Nanoscience and Nanotechnology

=== Turkey ===
- UNAM-Ulusal Nanoteknoloji Araştırma Merkezi, Bilkent University - master's, Ph.D (Materials Science and Nanotechnology)
- Hacettepe University - master's, Ph.D (Nanotechnology and Nanomedicine)
- TOBB University of Economics and Technology - B.S. Materials Science and Nanotechnology Engineering, master's, Ph.D
- Istanbul Technical University - master's, Ph.D (Nanoscience and Nanoengineering)
- Middle East Technical University - master's, Ph.D
- Anadolu University - master's
- Atatürk University - master's, Ph.D (Nanoscience and Nanoengineering)

== Europe ==
A list of the master's programs is kept by the UK-based Institute of Nanotechnology in their Nano, Enabling, and Advanced Technologies (NEAT) Post-graduate Course Directory.

=== Joint Programmes ===
- Chalmers.se, Frontiers Joint Curriculum - masters's
- EMM-NANO.org, Erasmus Mundus Master Nanoscience and Nanotechnology - master's
- Master-Nanotech.com, International Master in Nanotechnology - international master's

=== Belgium ===
- Katholieke Universiteit Leuven - master's in Nanotechnology and Nanoscience
- University of Antwerp - M.Sc in Nanophysics

=== Czech Republic ===
- Technical University of Liberec - bachelor's, master's, Ph.D
- Palacký University, Olomouc - bachelor's, master's
- Technical University of Ostrava - bachelor's, master's
- Technical University of Brno - bachelor's, master's
- Cyprus
- Near east university - bacherlor's

=== Denmark ===
- University of Aalborg - bachelor's, master's, Ph.D
- University of Aarhus - bachelor's, master's, Ph.D
- University of Copenhagen - bachelor's, master's, Ph.D
- Technical University of Denmark - bachelor's, master's, Ph.D
- University of Southern Denmark - bachelor's, master's, Ph.D

=== France ===
- Université Lille Nord de France & École Centrale de Lille, CARNOT Institut d'électronique de microélectronique et de nanotechnologie (Lille) - master's in microelectronics, nanotechnologies and telecom, doctorate (Ph.D in microelectronics, nanotechnologies, acoustics and telecommunications)
- University of Grenoble & Grenoble Institute of Technology, CARNOT CEA-Leti: Laboratoire d'électronique des technologies de l'information (LETI) • Minatec (Grenoble) - master's, doctorate
- University of Bordeaux, CARNOT Materials and systems Institute of Bordeaux (MIB) (Bordeaux) - master's, doctorate
- Université de Bourgogne, CARNOT Institut FEMTO-ST (Besançon) - Nanotechnologies et Nanobiosciences - master's, doctorate
- École Nationale Supérieure des Mines de Saint-Étienne, Centre de micro-électronique de Provence (Gardanne) - master's, doctorate
- Paris-Sud 11 University, Institut d'électronique fondamentale (Orsay) - master's, doctorate
- Paris-Pierre and Marie Curie University, Institut des nano-sciences (Paris) - master's, doctorate
- University of Toulouse, Institut de nano-technologies (Toulouse) - master's, doctorate
- University of Technology of Troyes - Nanotechnology (and Optics) - master's, doctorate
- University of Lyon & École Centrale de Lyon, Université Claude Bernard Lyon 1 a two-year nanotechnology M.Sc program

=== Germany ===
- Kaiserslautern University of Technology - master's, certificate short term courses (Distance Learning)
- Bielefeld University - master's
- Karlsruhe Institute of Technology, graduate degrees
- University of Duisburg-Essen - bachelor's, master's
- University of Erlangen–Nuremberg - bachelor's, master's
- University of Hamburg - bachelor's, master's
- University of Hannover - bachelor's
- University of Kassel - bachelor's
- Ludwig-Maximilians-Universität München - Ph.D
- Munich University of Applied Sciences - master's
- Saarland University - bachelor's
- University of Ulm - master's
- University of Würzburg - bachelor's

=== Greece ===
- National Technical University of Athens - master's in Micro-systems and Nano-devices

=== Ireland ===
- Trinity College, Dublin - bachelor's
- Dublin Institute of Technology - bachelor's

=== Italy ===
- IUSS Pavia - master's
- Mediterranea University of Reggio Calabria - master's
- Perugia University - master's
- Polytechnic University of Turin - master's
- Polytechnic University of Milan - bachelor's, master's
- Sapienza University of Rome - master's
- University of Padua - master's
- University of Salento - master's
- University of Trieste - Ph.D
- University of Venice - bachelor's, master's
- University of Verona - master's

=== Netherlands ===
- Radboud University Nijmegen - master's, Ph.D
- Leiden University - master's
- Delft University of Technology - master's, Ph.D
- University of Groningen - master's, Ph.D, including the Top Master Program in Nanoscience
- University of Twente - master's

=== Norway ===
- Vestfold University College - bachelor's, master's, Ph.D
- Norwegian University of Science and Technology - master's
- University of Bergen - bachelor's and master's
- University of Oslo - bachelor's and master's

=== Poland ===
- Gdańsk University of Technology - bachelor's, master's
- Jagiellonian University - bachelor's, master's, Ph.D
- University of Warsaw - bachelor's and master's in Nanostructure Engineering (http://nano.fuw.edu.pl/ - only in Polish)

=== Russia ===
- Mendeleev Russian University of Chemistry and Technology - bachelor's
- Moscow State University - bachelor's, master's
- Moscow Institute of Physics and Technology (MIPT)
- National Research University of Electronic Technology (MIET) - bachelor's, master's
- Peoples' Friendship University of Russia (PFUR) - master's in engineering & technology: "Nanotechnology and Microsystem Technology"
- National University of Science and Technology MISIS - bachelor's, master's
- Samara State Aerospace University - bachelor's, master's
- Tomsk State University of Control Systems and Radioelectronics (TUSUR)
- Ural Federal University (UrFU) - bachelor's (master's) of Engineering & Technology: "Nanotechnology and Microsystem Technology", "Electronics and Nanoelectronics" (profiles: "Physical Electronics", "Functional Materials of micro-, opto-and nanoelectronics")

=== Spain ===
- DFA.ua.es, Master en Nanociencia y Nanotecnologia Molecular - master's
- Universitat Autònoma de Barcelona, bachelor's in nanoscience and nanotechnology
- Universitat Autònoma de Barcelona, master's in nanotechnology
- Rovira i Virgili at Tarragona, master's in nanoscience and nanotechnology

=== Sweden ===
- KTH Royal Institute of Technology - master's
- Linköping University - master's
- Lund University - bachelor's, master's
- Chalmers University of Technology - bachelor's, master's

=== Switzerland ===
- Eidgenössische Technische Hochschule Zürich, Zurich - master's, Ph.D
- University of Basel - bachelor's, master's, Ph.D

=== United Kingdom ===
- Bangor University - master's
- University of Birmingham - Ph.D
- University of Cambridge - master's, Ph.D
- Cranfield University - master's, Ph.D (Certificate/Degree Programs)
- Heriot-Watt University - bachelor's, master's
- Lancaster University - master's
- Imperial College London - master's
- University College London - master's
- University of Leeds - bachelor's, master's
- University of Liverpool - master's
- University of Manchester- Ph.D
- University of Nottingham - master's
- University of Oxford - Postgraduate Certificate
- University of Sheffield - master's, Ph.D
- University of Surrey - master's
- University of Sussex - bachelor's
- University of Swansea- B.Eng, M.Eng, M.Sc, M.Res, M.Phil and Ph.D
- University of Ulster - master's
- University of York- bachelor's, master's

== North America ==
=== Canada ===
- University of Alberta - B.Sc in Engineering Physics with Nanoengineering option
- University of Toronto - B.A.Sc in Engineering Science with Nanoengineering option
- University of Waterloo - B.A.Sc in Nanotechnology Engineering
  - Waterloo Institute for Nanotechnology -B.Sc, B.A.Sc, master's, Ph.D, Post Doctorate
- McMaster University - B.Sc in Engineering Physics with Nanotechnology option
- University of British Columbia - B.A.Sc in Electrical Engineering with Nanotechnology & Microsystems option
- Carleton University - B.Sc in Chemistry with Concentration in Nanotechnology
- University of Calgary - B.Sc Minor in Nanoscience, B.Sc Concentration in Nanoscience
- University of Guelph - B.Sc in Nanoscience
- Northern Alberta Institute of Technology - Technical Diploma in Nanotechnology Systems

=== México ===
- Universidad tecnológica gral. Mariano Escobedo (UTE) - bachelor's in Nanotechnology
- Instituto Nacional de Astrofisica, Optica y Electronica (INAOE) - M.Sc and Ph.D
- Centro de Investigación en Materiales Avanzados (CIMAV) - M.Sc and PhD in Nanotechnology
- Instituto Potosino de Investigación Científica y Tecnológica (IPICyT) - M.Sc and PhD in Nanotechnology
- Centro de Investigación en Química Aplicada (CIQA) - M.Sc and PhD in Nanotechnology
- Centro de Investigación y de Estudios Avanzados (CINVESTAV) - Ph.D in Nanoscience and Nanotechnology
- Universidad Politécnica del Valle de México (UPVM) - bachelor's in Nanotechnology Engineering
- Universidad de las Américas Puebla (UDLAP)- bachelor's (Nanotechnology and Molecular Engineering). This undergraduate program was the first one at Mexico and Latin America, specializing professionals in the field; it started in August 2006. An account on its historical development has recently been published.
- Instituto Tecnológico y de Estudios Superiores de Occidente (ITESO)- bachelor's
- Instituto Tecnológico Superior de Poza Rica (ITSPR)- bachelor's
- Universidad de La Ciénega de Michoacán de Ocampo (UCMO)- bachelor's in Nanotechnology Engineering
- Instituto Tecnologico de Tijuana (ITT) - bachelor's (Nanotechnology Engineering)
- Universidad Autónoma de Querétaro (UAQ) - bachelor's in Nanotechnology Engineering
- Universidad Autónoma de Baja California (UABC) - bachelor's in Nanotechnology Engineering
- Universidad Veracruzana (UV) - Master of Science in Micro and Nanosystems
- Instituto Mexicano del Petróleo (IMP) - M.Sc & Ph.D in Materials and Nanostructures
- Universidad Nacional Autónoma de México (UNAM) at Mexico City, University City (UNAM) - M.Sc & Ph.D in Materials approach to nanoscience and nanotechnology
- Universidad Nacional Autónoma de México (UNAM) at Ensenada, Baja California (UNAM) - Bachelor in Nanotechnology Engineering
- Another Universities and Institutes in Mexico

=== United States ===
- Arizona State University - Professional Science master's (PSM) in Nanoscience
- Boston University - Concentration in Nanotechnology, Minor in Nanotechnology Engineering.
- Chippewa Valley Technical College - associate degree
- Cinano.com, International Association of Nano and California Institute of Nano, (CNCP) Certified Nano and Clean technology Professional-Nanotechnology Experience for Engineers
- College of Nanoscale Science and Engineering - B.S., M.S., Ph.D in Nanoscale Science, Nanoscale Engineering
- Dakota County Technical College - associate degree
- Danville Community College - A.A.S. in Nanotechnology
- Forsyth Technical Community College - Associate of Science
- George Mason University (Virginia) - Graduate certificate
- Hudson Valley Community College - associate degree, Electrical Technology: Semiconductor Manufacturing Technology
- Ivy Tech Community College of Indiana - Associate of Science in Nanotechnology.
- Johns Hopkins University - M.S. in Materials Science and Engineering with Nanotechnology Option
- Louisiana Tech University - B.S. Nanosystems Engineering, M.S. Molecular Sciences & Nanotechnology, Ph.D (Micro/Nanotechnology and Micro/Nanoelectronics Emphasis)
- North Dakota State College of Science - associate degree
- Northern Illinois University - Certificate in Nanotechnology
- Oklahoma State University–Okmulgee Institute of Technology - Associate of Technology
- Penn State University - Minor in Nanotechnology, M.S. Nanotechnology
- Portland State University - undergraduate/graduate course in support of a Ph.D program in Applied Physics
- Radiological Technologies University - M.S. in Nanomedicine and dual MS in Nanomedicine and Medical Physics
- Rice University - Public Outreach, K to 12 Summer Programs, Undergraduate and Graduate Programs/Degrees, Integrated Physics & Chemistry - Nanotechnology Experience for Teachers Program, Research Experience for Undergraduates Program
- Richland College - associate degree
- Rochester Institute of Technology, B.S., M.S. Microelectronic Engineering, Ph.D Microsystems Engineering
- Stevens Institute of Technology - Five departments in engineering and science offer Master of Science, Master of Engineering, and Doctor of Philosophy degrees with Nanotechnology concentration
- University at Albany, The State University of New York - B.S. Nanoscale Science, B.S. Nanoscale Engineering, master's and Ph.D
- University of Arkansas, Fayetteville - M.S./Ph.D Several departments in Science and Engineering have excellent research in Nanotechnology
- University of California, San Diego - B.S. Nanoengineering, M.S. Nanoengineering
- University of California, San Diego - B.S. NanoEngineering, M.S. NanoEngineering, Ph.D NanoEngineering
- University of Central Florida - B.S. Nanoscience and Nanotechnology track in Liberal Studies
- University of Central Florida, Orlando, FL - B.S. in Nanoscience and Nanotechnology track in Liberal Studies
- University of Maryland, College Park - Minor in Nanoscale Science and Technology NanoCenter.umd.edu
- University of Nevada, Reno - Minor in Nanotechnology
- University of North Carolina at Charlotte - Ph.D
- University of North Carolina at Greensboro and NC A&T State University Joint School of Nanoscience & Nanoengineering - M.S. and PhD in Nanoscience and Nanoengineering
- University of Oklahoma Bachelor of Science in Engineering Physics - Nanotechnology
- University of Pennsylvania- Master of Science in Engineering (M.S.E.), Undergraduate Minor , Graduate Certificate in Nanotechnology.
- University of Pittsburgh - Bachelor in Engineering Science - Nanoengineering
- University of Tulsa - B.S. with a specialization in nanotechnology
- University of Utah - Nanomedicine and Nanobiosensors. [nano.Utah.edu]
- University of Washington- Nanoscience and Molecular Engineering option under Materials Science and Engineering, Ph.D in Nanotechnology
- University of Wisconsin - Platteville - Minor in Microsystems & Nanotechnology
- University of Wisconsin - Stout - B.S. in Nanotechnology and Nanoscience
- Virginia Commonwealth University - Ph.D in Nanoscience and Nanotechnology
- Virginia Tech B.S. in Nanoscience
- Wayne State University - Nanoengineering Certificate Program

== Oceania ==
=== Australia ===
==== New South Wales ====
- University of New South Wales - bachelor's, Ph.D
- University of Sydney - Bachelor of Science majoring in Nanoscience and Technology
- University of Technology, Sydney - bachelor's
- University of Western Sydney - bachelor's
- University of Wollongong - bachelor's

==== Queensland ====
- University of Queensland - bachelor's

==== South Australia ====
- Flinders University - bachelor's, master's

==== Victoria ====
- La Trobe University, Melbourne - Ph.D, master's in Nanotechnology (Graduate Entry), master's/bachelor's (double degree), bachelor's (double degree) website
- RMIT University - bachelor's
- The University of Melbourne - master's
- St Helena Secondary College Melbourne - High School education

==== Western Australia ====
- Curtin University - bachelor's
- University of Western Australia - bachelor's
- Murdoch University - bachelor's

=== New Zealand ===
- Massey University, New Zealand - Bachelor of Science (Nanoscience)
- Massey University, New Zealand - Bachelor of Engineering (Nanotechnology)

== South America ==
=== Brazil ===
- Universidade Federal do Rio Grande do Sul, UFRGS - bachelor's
- Federal University of Rio de Janeiro - bachelor's, master's, Ph.D
- Universidade Federal do ABC - master's, Ph.D
- Centro Universitário Franciscano - UNIFRA - master's
- Pontifícia Universidade Católica do Rio de Janeiro - bachelor's, master's, Ph.D

== Accreditation and quality standards ==
Nanotechnology engineering programs in the United States are eligible for accreditation through ABET (Accreditation Board for Engineering and Technology), which evaluates programs against criteria developed by engineering and scientific professional bodies. In Europe, programs may seek accreditation under the EUR-ACE framework. Researchers at Northwestern University developed a curriculum rubric for post-secondary nanotechnology degree programs based on a set of "big ideas" in nanoscale science and engineering identified through a series of national workshops, providing one of the few published frameworks for evaluating program content across institutions. The absence of universally agreed-upon learning outcomes for nanotechnology graduates has been identified as a recurring challenge, with ongoing debate about whether standalone nanotechnology degrees or nano-concentrations within existing engineering disciplines better serve both students and employers.

== Nanotechnology in schools ==
In recent years, there has been a growing interest in introducing nanoscience and nanotechnology in grade schools, especially at the high school level. In the United States, although very few high schools officially offer a two-semester course in nanotechnology, “nano” concepts are bootstrapped and taught during traditional science classes using a number of educational resources and hands-on activities developed by dedicated non-profit organizations, such as:

- The National Science Teacher Association, which has published a number of textbooks for nanotechnology in K-12 education, including a teacher's guide and an activity manual for hands-on experiences.
- Nano-Link, a notable program of the Dakota County Technical College, which has developed a variety of nanotech-related hands-on activities supported by toolkits to teach concepts in nanotechnology throughout direct lab experience.
- Omni Nano, which is developing comprehensive educational resources specifically designed to support a two-semester high school course, both online and in classrooms. Omni Nano also discusses issues in nanotechnology education on its dedicated blog.
- Nano4Me, which has a good amount of resources for K-12 education, although their program is intended for higher education. Their K-12 resources include introductory level modules and activities, interactive multimedia, and a collection of experiments and hands-on activities.
- Nanoscale Informal Science Education Network (NISE Network), which has a website of educational products designed to engage the public in nano science, engineering, and technology. The NISE Network also organizes NanoDays, a nationwide festival of educational programs about nanoscale science and engineering and its potential impact on the future.

In Egypt, in2nano is a high school outreach program aiming to increase scientific literacy and prepare students for the sweeping changes of nanotechnology.

== Nanotechnology education outside of school ==
- Nanoscale Informal Science Education Network (NISE Network) has a website of educational products designed to engage the public in nano science, engineering, and technology. The NISE Network also organizes NanoDays, a nationwide festival of educational programs about nanoscale science and engineering and its potential impact on the future.

== Employment and career ==
Graduates of nanotechnology programs find employment across a range of industries, including semiconductor manufacturing, pharmaceuticals, biomedical devices, defence, energy, and advanced materials. The majority of positions in the nanotechnology sector are held by scientists and highly trained engineers, reflecting the field's continued focus on research and development, though demand has grown for technicians and qualified workers in manufacturing, quality control, and related roles. In the field of nanomedicine, roles require knowledge spanning physics, chemistry, materials science, biochemistry, and medicine, underlining the workforce preparation challenge facing educational programs.
