= Leopoldo García-Colín =

Mexican chemist (1930-2012)

Leopoldo García-Colín Scherer
- Born: 27 November 1930 (age 95); Mexico City, Mexico
- Died: October 8, 2012 (aged 81); Mexico City
- Education: National Autonomous University of Mexico (UNAM), University of Maryland, College Park.
- Awards: National Prize for Arts and Sciences (Mexico, 1988)
- Scientific career
- Fields: Thermodynamics. Statistical Mechanics, mainly out of equilibrium
- Workplaces: Cinvestav, Autonomous University of Puebla, Metropolitan Autonomous University
- Doctoral advisor: Elliott Waters Montroll
- Other academic advisors: Marcos Moshinsky, Alejandro Medina

Leopoldo García-Colín Scherer (27 November 1930, in Mexico City – 8 October 2012, in Mexico City) was a Mexican scientist specialized in Thermodynamics and Statistical Mechanics who received the National Prize for Arts and Sciences in 1988.

He was a member of The National College, a former president of the Mexican Society of Physics (SMF, 1972–1973) and has received honorary degrees from several universities, including the National Autonomous University of Mexico (UNAM) and the Metropolitan Autonomous University (UAM).

== Career ==
He obtained a Chemistry degree at Universidad Nacional Autónoma de México (UNAM) in 1953. The Ph.D. in Physics at the University of Maryland in 1959. He was professor at Benemérita Universidad Autónoma de Puebla from 1960 to 1963, and at Facultad de Ciencias in UNAM from 1967 to 1984. Later, he participated in research at the Centro Nuclear de Salazar, a Nuclear center in Mexico; assistant director of Basic Investigation of Processes at Instituto Mexicano del Petróleo from 1967 to 1974, professor at Instituto de Investigaciones de Materiales in UNAM during the period from 1984 to 1988. At the end of his career he had a tenure position at Universidad Autónoma Metropolitana at Iztapalapa. He was elected to El Colegio Nacional in September 12, 1977. He was member of the Sistema Nacional de Investigadores with the highest level, III, since 1988. He received a honoris causa Ph. D from the National University of Mexico in April, 2007.
