= Octavio Novaro =

Mexican theoretical physicist (1939–2018)

- Born: 4 July 1939; Mexico City, Mexico
- Died: 6 March 2018 (aged 78)
- Education: National Autonomous University of Mexico
- Known for: Research on catalysis phenomena
- Awards: UNESCO Science Prize (1993), National Prize for Arts and Sciences (Mexico, 1983)
- Scientific career
- Fields: Chemical Physics
- Workplaces: Institute of Physics, National Autonomous University of Mexico
- Doctoral advisor: Marcos Moshinsky

Octavio Augusto Novaro Peñalosa (4 July 1939 – 6 March 2018) was a prominent theoretical physicist specialized in theoretical catalysis, physical chemistry, biophysics and geophysics. He received the National Prize for Arts and Sciences in 1983 and became the first Mexican researcher to receive the UNESCO Science Prize in 1993. Since 1995 he was also one of the forty lifetime members of The National College.

Novaro Peñalosa was born in Mexico City and graduated from the National Autonomous University of Mexico with a bachelor's degree (1965), a master's degree (1968) and a doctorate degree in Physics (1969) under the supervision of Marcos Moshinsky. Later on, he worked in postdoctoral research programs in Sweden, Italy, Turkey and the United States.

He worked as a professor researcher at the National Autonomous University of Mexico since 1971 and for over fifteen years he worked and advised the Mexican Institute of Petroleum, where he designed several catalysts used in the petrochemical industry. During his career he published over 225 articles, 4 books, obtained 4 patents and some of his former students have become rectors in China or heads of laboratories in France, Poland and Scotland.

According to his résumé, he was also an accomplished polyglot fluent in Spanish, English, French, Italian and Portuguese; translated, read and wrote German, Russian and Greek and spoke both Chinese and Japanese.
