= Diffraction in time =

Diffraction of matter waves at the quantum scale

In quantum physics, diffraction in time is a phenomenon associated with the quantum dynamics of suddenly released matter waves initially confined in a region of space. It was introduced in 1952 by Ukrainian-Mexican physicist Marcos Moshinsky with the shutter problem. A matter-wave beam stopped by an absorbing shutter exhibits an oscillatory density profile during its propagation after removal of the shutter. Whenever this propagation is accurately described by the time-dependent Schrödinger equation, the transient wave functions resemble the solutions that appear for the intensity of light subject to Fresnel diffraction by a straight edge. For this reason, the transient phenomenon was dubbed diffraction in time and has since then been recognised as ubiquitous in quantum dynamics. The experimental confirmation of this phenomenon was only achieved about half a century later in the group of ultracold atoms directed by Jean Dalibard. Photonic analog of the time diffraction was also observed with a temporal double-slit configuration in 2023 with a group directed by John Pendry and Riccardo Sapienza.
