= Indian Institute of Nano Science & Technology =

Indian research institute

Coordinates: 13.01978°N 77.56605°E

- Type: Research Institution
- Location: Bangalore, Karnataka, India

Indian Institute of Nano Science & Technology (IINSc) is a research institution that teaches nano science and technology. It is located in Bangalore, India.

== History ==
Karnataka is home to many such initiatives..and for Indian Institute of Nano Science & Technology to support and develop nanotechnology and reap the benefit of technology. Nanotechnology in India has developed importance.

In Karnataka research centres like Jawaharlal Nehru Centre for Advanced Scientific Research Centre, Indian Institute of Science and the National Centre for Biological Sciences are main research institutes which support the nano park initiative.

The focus of the Indian Institute of Nano Science & Technology will be research and development of nano materials.

Nano Park is the first of its kind in India and supports the development of medical devices, diagnostic kits and pharmaceuticals.

=== Campus ===
Karnataka state government initiated to set Nano Park in Bangalore with estimated budget allocation of Rs. 150 Crores . The park spreads 25 acres of land and building at Tumakur Road Bangalore. The Park will be on similar lines of an Information Technology Park.

=== Main building ===
The infrastructure would include a science and technology business incubator which will nurture early stage entrepreneurial ventures based on nano science and technology. There will be laboratories and clean rooms that will prove conducive for nano research.

== See also ==
- Energy applications of nanotechnology
- Outline of nanotechnology
- List of emerging technologies
- List of nanotechnology organizations
- List of software for nanostructures modeling
- Nanobiotechnology
- Nanoengineering
- Nanoscale networks
- Nanotechnology education
