= Castillejo de Iniesta =

- Municipality
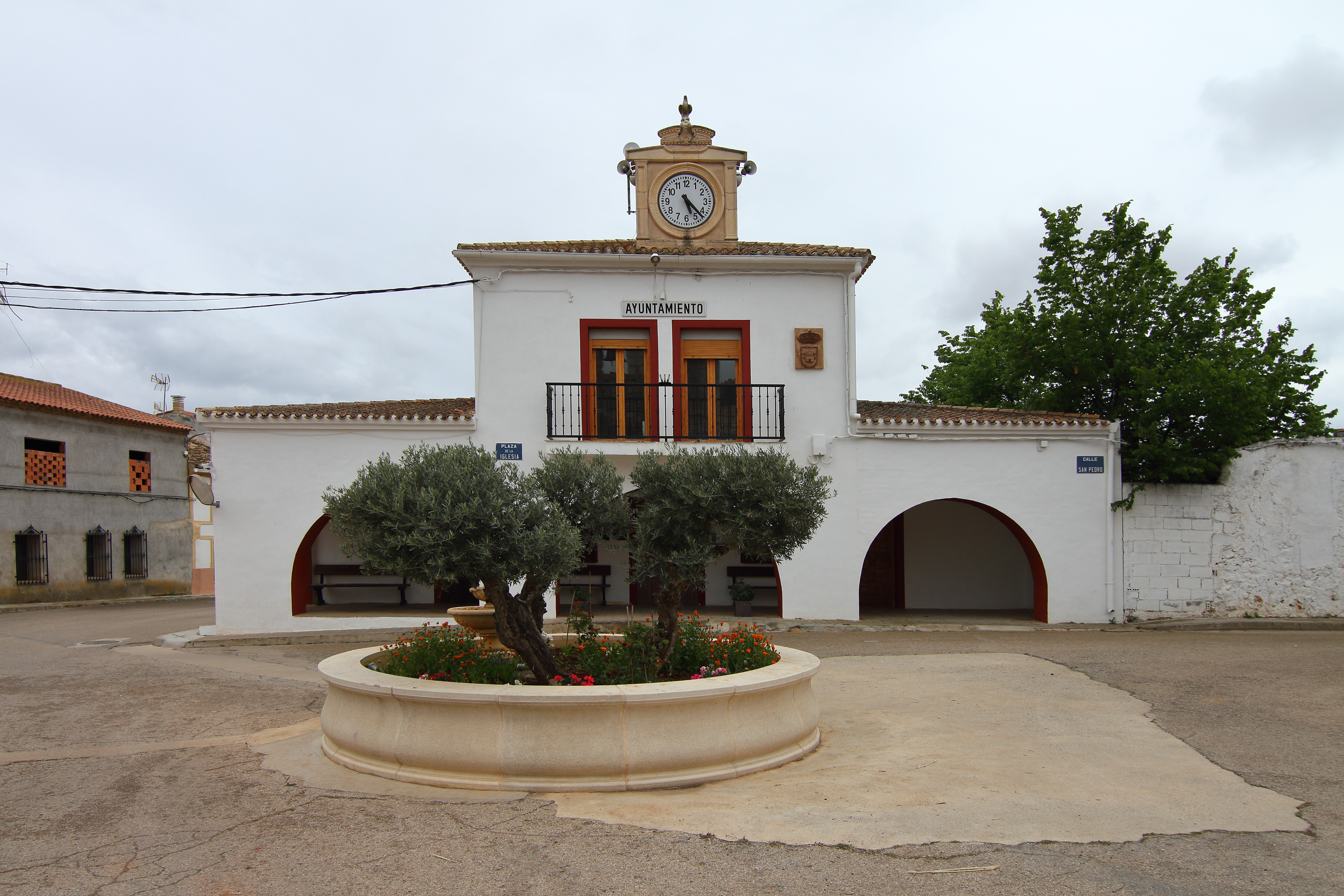
- Town hall

- Flag Coat of arms

- Location in Spain
- Coordinates: 39°32′N 1°46′W
- Country: Spain
- Autonomous community: Castile-La Mancha
- Province: Cuenca
- Comarca: Manchuela conquense

Government
  - Alcalde: Enrique Lucas Mateo (2007) (PSOE)

Area
  - Total: 27.70 km^{2} (10.70 sq mi)
- Elevation: 824 m (2,703 ft)

Population (2025-01-01)
  - Total: 94
  - Density: 3.4/km^{2} (8.8/sq mi)
- Demonym(s): Castillejero, castillejera
- Time zone: UTC+1 (CET)
  - Summer (DST): UTC+2 (CEST)
- Postal code: 16250

Castillejo de Iniesta is a municipality in Cuenca, Castile-La Mancha, Spain. It just west of Graja de Iniesta.

In recent years, there has been a movement to remove the Iniesta element in the name of the town.
