= Iniesta =

Iniesta is a Spanish surname. It most commonly refers to:

- Andrés Iniesta (born 1984), Spanish football player

Notable people with the name also include:

- Alberto Iniesta Jiménez (1923–2016), Spanish prelate of the Roman Catholic Church
- Andrés Iniesta (Spanish wrestler), (born 1974)
- Baltasar Mena Iniesta (born 1942), Spanish-born Mexican mechanical engineer
- Carlos Iniesta (born 1966), Spanish windsurfer
- Carlos Iniesta Cano (1908–1990), Spanish general
- David Haro Iniesta (born 1990), Spanish footballer
- Isabel Belén Iniesta Egido (born 1989), Spanish politician
- Pablo Sanz Iniesta (born 1973), Spanish footballer
- Roberto Iniesta (1962–2025), Spanish singer-songwriter and guitarist
