= Mexican Petroleum Institute =

Mexican research institute

Mexican Petroleum Institute Instituto Mexicano del Petróleo
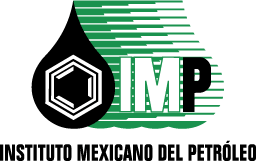

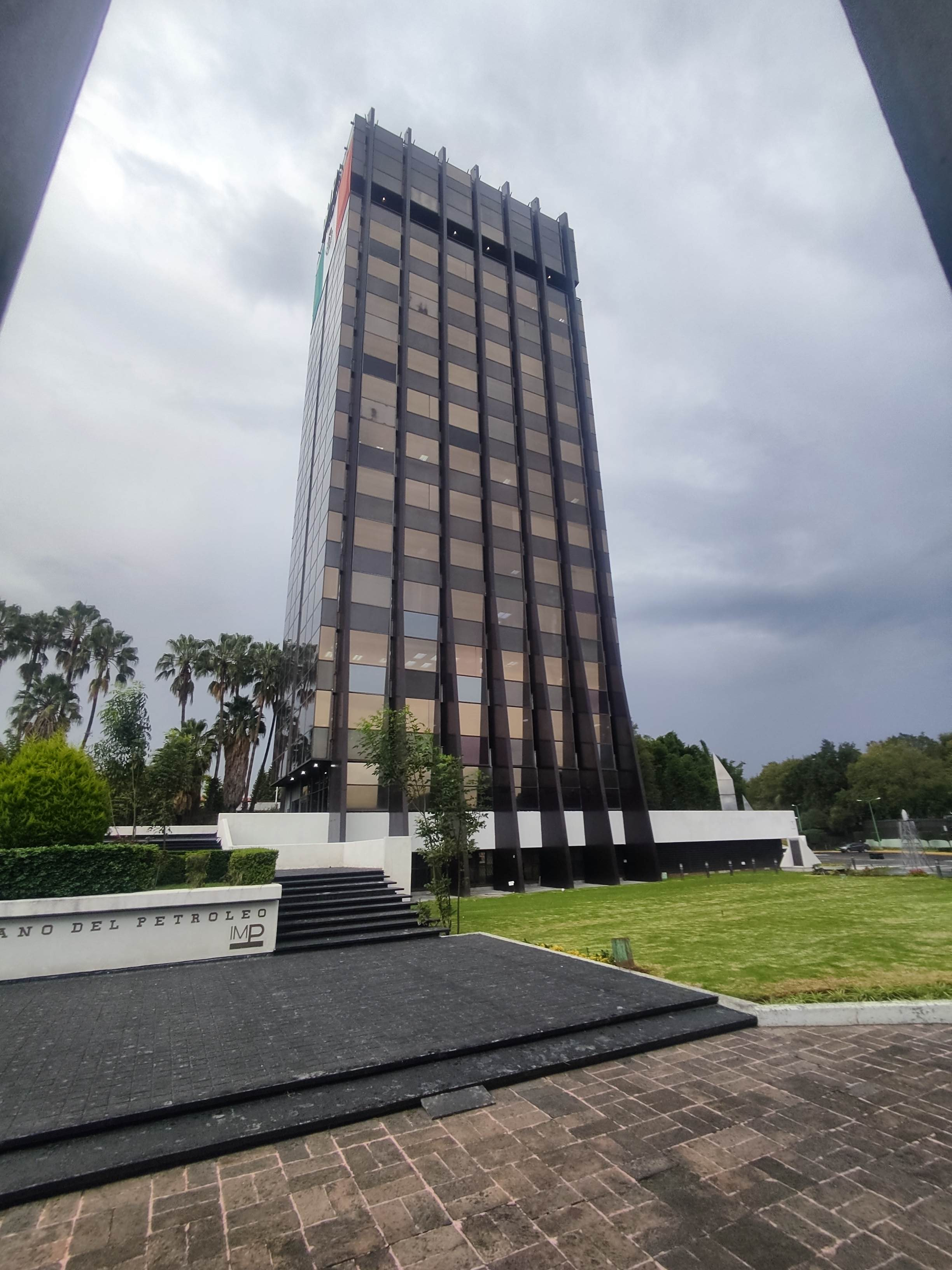
- Headquarters at Mexico City
- Formation: 23 August 1965; 61 years ago
- Type: Public research organization
- Headquarters: Mexico City, Mexico
- Coordinates: 19.489866°N 99.145957°W
- Director-General: Elizabeth Mar Juarez
- Parent organization: Secretariat of Energy (Mexico)
- Affiliations: World Energy Council, NARSTO, AMEDES, ANUIES, CUDI, ICEM
- Website: www.imp.mx

The Mexican Petroleum Institute (in Spanish: Instituto Mexicano del Petróleo, IMP) is a public research organization dedicated to developing technical solutions, conducting basic and applied research and providing specialized training to Pemex, the state-owned government-granted monopoly in Mexico's petroleum industry.

The Institute was founded on 23 August 1965 by federal decree and is based in Mexico City. Despite facing significant budget constraints in recent years and being accused of depending excessively on foreign technology by noted physicist Leopoldo García-Colín, it was the leading patent applicant among Mexican institutions in 2005 and houses one of the most advanced microscopes on the planet.

== Noted researchers ==
- Leopoldo García-Colín: physicist laureated with the 1988 National Prize for Arts and Sciences.
- Luis E. Miramontes: co-inventor of the first oral contraceptive. Laureated with the National Prize on Chemistry "Andrés Manuel del Rio" in 1986.
- Octavio Novaro: recipient of the 1993 UNESCO Science Prize for his contributions to understanding catalysis phenomena.
- Alexander Balankin: physicist laureated with the 2002 National Prize for Arts and Sciences and recipient of the 2005 UNESCO Science Prize for his remarkable ability to relate his research in fractal mechanics to technological applications that has provided great benefits to Mexico and worldwide.

== See also ==
- Indian Institute of Petroleum
- French Institute of Petroleum
- Vietnam Petroleum Institute
