= Center of Excellence in Nanotechnology =

Center of Excellence in Nanotechnology at AIT
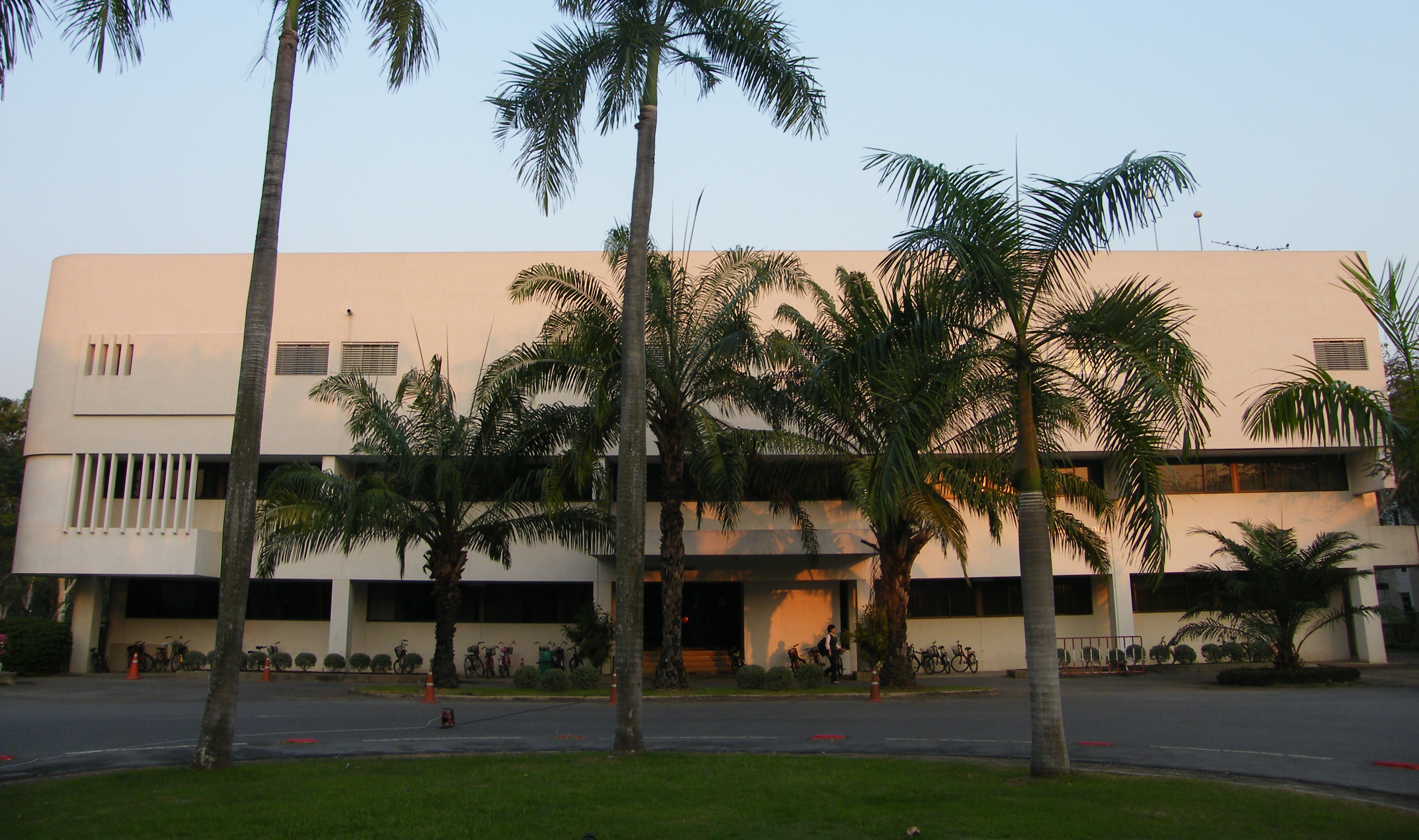
- CoEN @ AIT
- Motto: There is no sky to limit us at the bottom
- Type: Center of Excellence
- Endowment: NANOTEC, NSTDA
- Director: Prof. Louis G. Horniyak
- Academic staff: 6
- Administrative staff: 5
- Students: 23
- Postgraduates: 23
- Doctoral students: 11
- Location: Klong Luang, Bangkok, Pathum Thani, Thailand; 14.079447°N 100.603835°E
- Campus: Suburban
- Website: https://ait.ac.th/centre/ait-center-of-excellence-in-nanotechnology/

The Center of Excellence in Nanotechnology (CoEN) is a nanotechnology facility located at the Asian Institute of Technology (AIT). It is one of the 8 centers of excellence in Thailand.

The CoEN at the AIT is used for applied research and graduate education in nanotechnology. Current research activities at the CoEN focus on dye-sensitive solar cells, electronic devices, gas sensors, bio-diagnostic tools, specific microscopic sensors, heavy-metal-ion sensors for wastewater, environmental mitigation through visible light photocatalysis, the shake-up of nanoparticles, and layer-by-layer growth from colloidal particles, among others. The Master's degree program in Nanotechnology was launched in 2009. The center has over 30 members from 10 countries carrying out cross-disciplinary research in nanotechnology.

The Center collaborates with many international institutions, most notably:

- State University of New York at Buffalo, United States,
- S. N. Bose National Centre for Basic Sciences, India,
- Center of Photoelectrochemical Energy, Korea University, South Korea,
- Center for Nanobioscience, Agharkar Research Institute, India,
- Inorganic Materials Laboratory, KTH Royal Institute of Technology, Sweden,
- Swiss Federal Institute of Technology, Switzerland,
- Uppsala University, Sweden,
- University of Quebec, Canada,
- Leibniz Institute of New Materials, Germany,
- University of California, Berkeley, United States,
- and Griffith University, Australia.

== History ==
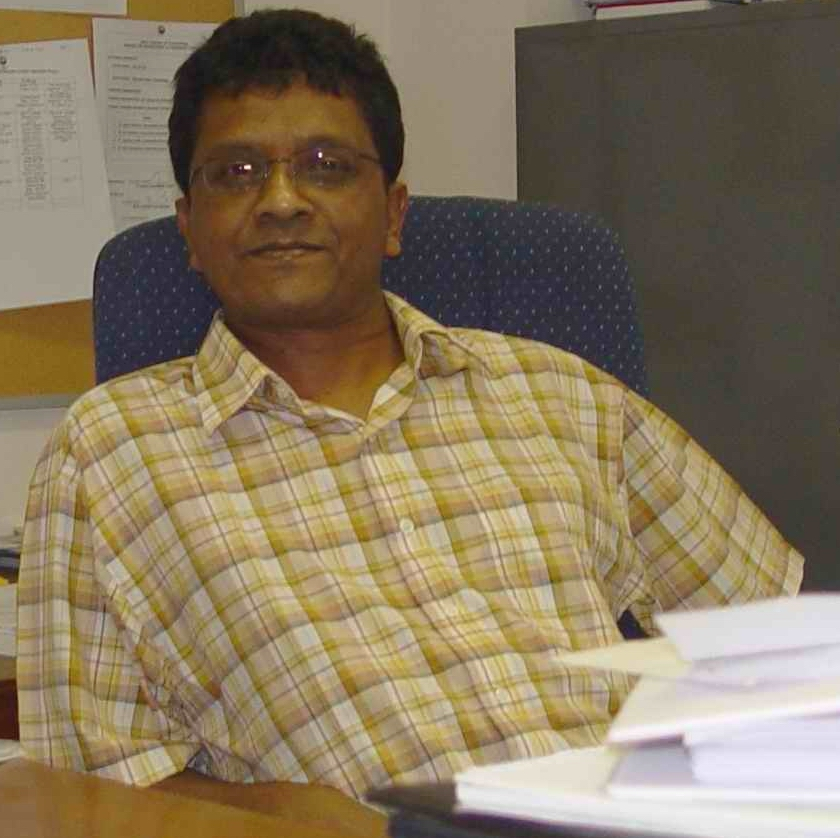
Prof. Joydeep Dutta, Director, CoEN

The Center of Excellence in Nanotechnology was launched in 2006 to address the shortage of research facilities in Thailand. Activities included joint research with local and international universities and institutes, education and training in nanotechnology, technology transfer, and promotion of public and industrial awareness of nanotechnology. This center provides an international platform for academics and researchers from Thailand, AIT, and industry.

In Thailand, there are currently 8 Centers of Excellence under the Thailand National Nanotechnology Center: NANOTEC: Kasetsert University, Bangkok; Chulalongkorn University, Bangkok; King Mongkut Institute of Technology, Ladkrabang, Bangkok; Mahidol University, Bangkok; Asian Institute of Technology, Pathum Thani; Prince of Songkhla University, Phuket; Khon Kaen University, Khon Kaen; and Chiang Mai University, Chiang Mai.

The Center of Excellence in Nanotechnology at AIT was set up jointly with the National Nanotechnology Center, Thailand, of the NSTDA, at the Asian Institute of Technology campus in Thailand. Under the agreement, AIT and NANOTEC support the center jointly. A few faculties at AIT joined hands to propose that this center be established in the institute. The faculties came from all three schools, and the founding members were: Prof. Joydeep Dutta, Prof. W. Kanok-Nukulchai, Dr. Oleg Shipin, the late Dr. N. Coowanitwong, Dr. M. Parnichkun, Dr. Mousa M. Nazhad, Dr. S. Venkatesh and Dr. P. Herabat. A few rooms in the Chalarm Prakiat Building at the Asian Institute of Technology were allocated for its operation. Initially, due to a lack of sufficient funds, the center had a hard time starting operations. Prof. Joydeep Dutta, CoEN Director, recalls, "I used to get glasses and mugs from my house to fulfill the students requirements for glasswares in the lab." Over the years, the center got crowded with new equipment coming in and more researchers joining the nanoteam. Eventually, in September 2009, the center was officially shifted to the Outreach building.

On 8 September 2009, a state-of-the-art facility of the Center of Excellence in Nanotechnology at AIT was jointly inaugurated by Prof. Said Irandoust, AIT President, and Dr. Paritud Bhandhubanyong, Director, National Metal and Materials Technology Center. The lab had a bigger and larger space and was more open to visitors from outside.

== Administration ==
The Asian Institute of Technology governs the administrative activities of the Center of Excellence in Nanotechnology. Prof. Joydeep Dutta is the director of CoEN.

== Campus ==
The facilities provided for students in AIT are shared with the researchers of the center. These include sporting facilities such as football grounds, tennis courts, badminton courts, volleyball courts, basketball courts, a swimming pool, and a golf course. The facilities also include a two-story library is accessible to all members of AIT.

== Academics ==
Doctoral research in nanotechnology has been taking place since 2003. But, a Master's degree program in Nanotechnology at AIT was not available until August 2009. It has attracted considerable interest amongst students across Asia. The program is open to graduates with a Bachelor of engineering (electrical, chemical, mechanical, industrial, telecommunications, computer engineering, electronics, and instrumentation) as well as a Bachelor of Science (physics and chemistry).

Essential features of AIT's Nanotechnology degree program are: programmatic balance; processing nanostructure properties and applications (P-N-P-A); interdisciplinarity; science (including biology); and technology; integrated classroom-lab experience; hands-on experiments and use of instrumentation; curriculum-linked to applications; balance between theory and practice (industrial needs); and content addressing societal impact: public safety, ethics, and awareness.

=== Courses offered ===
The aim of the "Integrated Master's Degree programme in Nanotechnology" is to address the knowledge-based industries of the 21st century, which will require the continuous development of their workforce in this new field as well as a technically updated management. The Nanotechnology course is designed in such a way that students from different disciplines can get easily acquainted with the subject matter. Prof. Dutta, Director, CoeN at AIT, and Prof. G. Louis Hornyak, visiting faculty, are teaching students from different backgrounds, such as material sciences, chemistry, physics, agriculture, etc. The Nanotechnology Master's Degree Program is designed to be multidisciplinary, covering areas such as:

- The Macroscopic and Microscopic world
- Physics/Electronics
- Chemistry/Chemical Engineering.
- Biotechnology
- Material Sciences
- Microsystem Technology
- Instrumentation
- Environment

The list of the courses offered under School or an institute-level course: School of engineering and Technology and Area/Field of Study: Nanotechnology on the AIT website is given below.

- Self Assembly and Molecular Manufacturing (January)
- Impact of Nanotechnology on Society (August)
- Intellectual Property Rights for Technology Development and Management (August)
- Solid State Physics for Nanotechnology (January)
- Fundamentals of Chemistry (August)
- Catalysis (August)
- Nano Thermodynamics (January)
- Nanomaterials and Nanotechnology (January)
- Colloids and Nanoparticles (August)
- Microelectronics Fabrication Technology (August)
- Microelectromechanical and Nanoelectromechanical Systems (January)
- Characterization Tools in Nanotechnology (January)
- Advanced Seminars in Nanotechnology (January)

== Research ==
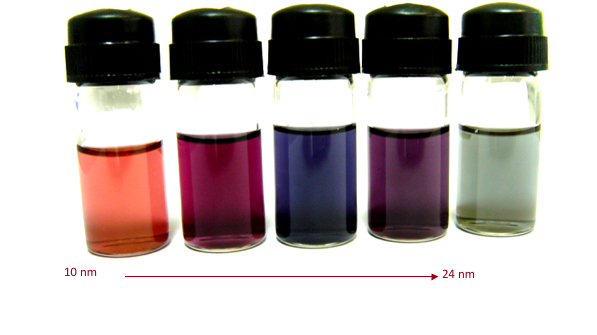
Optical photos of Gold NPs between 10 – 24 nm in size

The Center of Excellence in Nanotechnology has acquired synthesis experience with nanoparticles through reactive precipitation techniques. Gold, silver, platinum, palladium, zinc sulfide, zinc oxide, and silica nanoparticles are synthesized regularly at the center for a variety of applications. The platform technology of the center can be discussed as follows:

- Nanoparticles: gold, silver, platinum, palladium, silica, zinc oxide, and zinc sulfide
- Nanowires: zinc oxide
- Coating Techniques: sol-gel coating, pyrosol coating, layer-by-layer organization, inkjet printing, spin coating

Micrographs of Au and Ag NPs. (a) Au10, (b) Au25, (c) Auai, (d) Ag10, (e) Ag25, and (f) Agai

The research efforts in the AIT center are broadly classified into three groups:

- Environment: photocatalysis, heavy metal ion sensors, bacteria sensing, self-cleaning windows
- Agriculture and Food: E. coli sensors, E. nose, smart pesticides, gas sensors
- Alternate Energy Harvesting: nano-bio solar cells, nano-energy generators

The primary objective of the center is to seek applications for nanoparticles. Research work has extended to nanowires, and extensive work is being carried out, especially in the environmental application and the energy harvesting side of the application of nanowires on zinc oxide. The competence achieved at the CoEN in AIT has been primarily in the synthesis of metal nanoparticles like gold, silver, platinum, and palladium, and zinc compounds, namely zinc oxide and zinc sulfide. Some additional work on the development of sol-gel titanium dioxide has also taken place. Doping of semiconductor nanoparticles and studies on the defect engineering of metal oxides have been another key area of research at the center, with an objective to apply the added value obtained from defect engineering to some applications.

=== Synthesis of nanoparticles ===
The different methods employed to synthesize nanoparticles of gold, silver, zinc sulfide, zinc oxide, and silica, among others, are briefly given below:

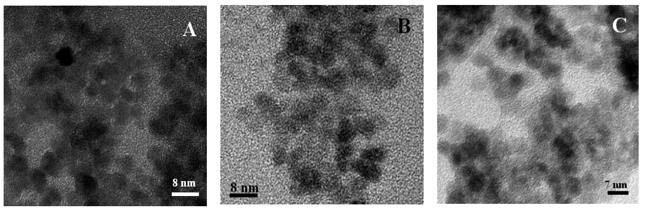
TEM micrographs of the NPs synthesized in (A) isopropanol, (B) methonal, and (C) ethanol

==== Gold Nanoparticles ====
Generally, gold nanoparticles in aqueous solutions are synthesized by the reduction of hydrogen tetrachloroaurate (HAuCl_{4}). To prevent the particles so formed from aggregating, often stabilizing agents are added. During the process, tri-sodium citrate reduces the gold salt to metallic gold particles, which act as seeds for continuous growth.

==== Silver Nanoparticles ====
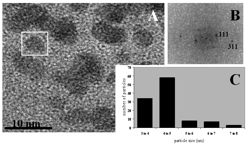
(A) HRTEM image showing ZnS:Mn2+ NPs of sizes between 4 and 6 nm. Crystallites are around 2 to 3 nm. (B) Fast Fourier Transformation done on the squared area (C) Particle size distribution (100 particles sampled)

The silver nanoparticles are synthesized by chemical reduction of silver nitrate. The reducing reagent used for the synthesis of silver nanoparticles is similar to the Turkevitch method, i.e., using tri-sodium citrate. After the creation of the nanoparticle colloids, in order to increase the viscosity for jetting the inks, polymers such as chitosan, polyvinyl alcohol (PVA), and polyethylene glycol (PEG) are added to stabilize the solution.

==== ZnS Nanoparticles ====
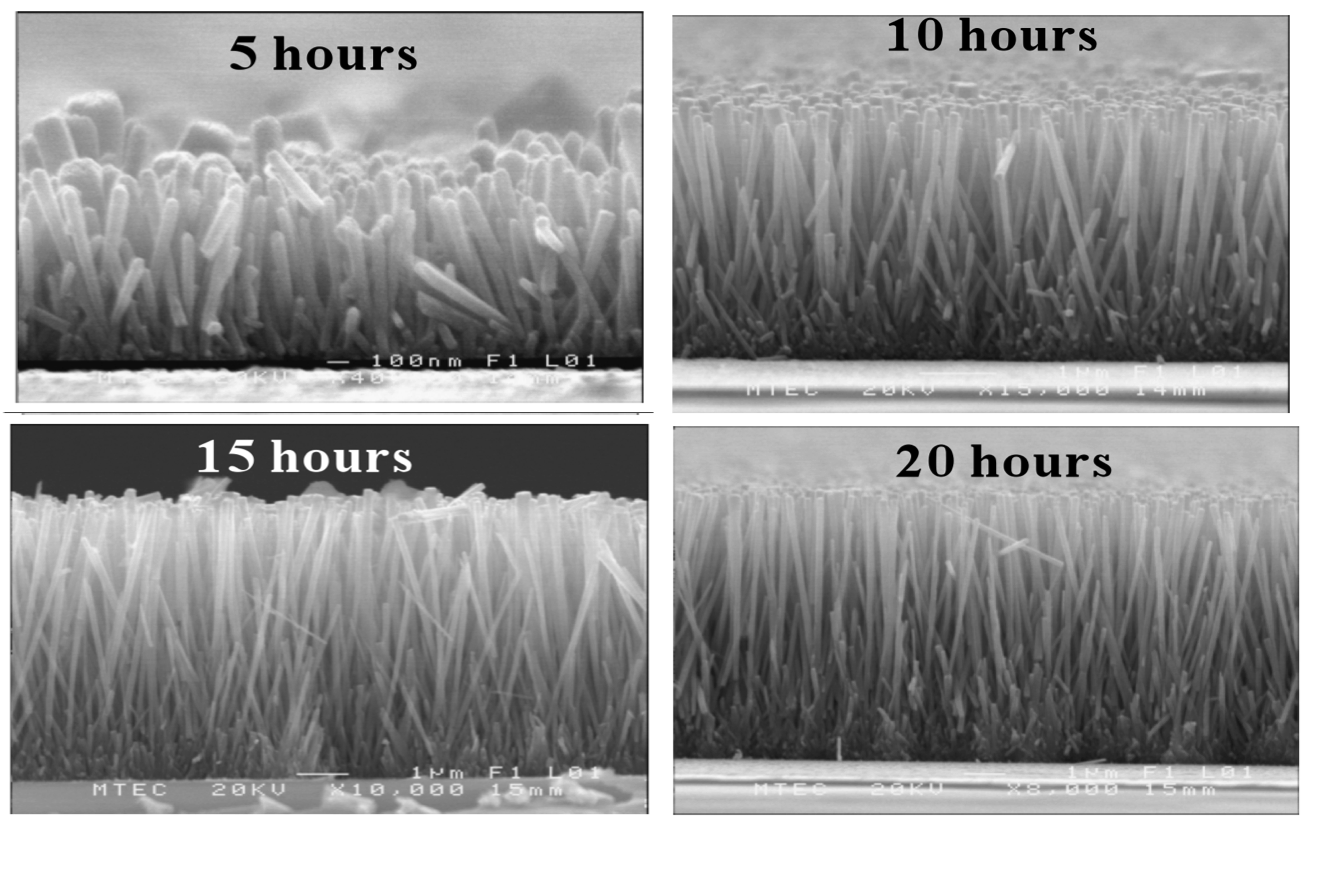
A CS view of ZnO NRs grown by hydrothermal processes at different times

The organometallic synthesis of ZnS:Mn^{2+} nanoparticles developed is similar to the method described by Bhargava et al.

==== ZnO Nanoparticles ====
ZnO nanoparticles are synthesized in three different solvents, and their optical absorptions are studied to determine in which solvent the nanoparticles absorb maximum visible light in the optical band ranging between 400 nm and 700 nm. The nanoparticles synthesized in different solvents (isopropanol, methanol, and ethanol) by the standard methods as explained in the experimental section yielded nanoparticles that are almost comparable in size (5 to 7 nm).

==== Silica Nanoparticles ====
Silica nanoparticles can be synthesized by the sol-gel method; Stöber et al. published a process for synthesising silica particles by hydrolysis of tetraethyl orthosilicate (TEOS) in an ethanol solution, which is catalyzed by ammonia (NH_{3}). Monodispersed silica spheres can be obtained from the hydrolysis and condensation of alkoxide silicon by the following methods:

Hydrolysis: to form silanol groups

Si(OR)_{4}+ H_{2}O → Si(OH)_{4}+ 4(R-OH)

Condensation : to form siloxane bridges

2Si(OH)_{4}→ 2(Si-O-Si) + 4H_{2}O

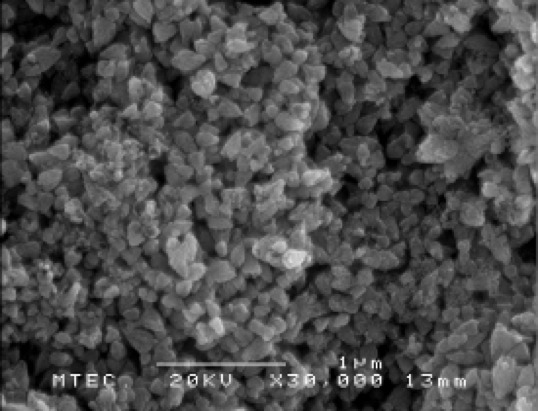
SEM micrographs showing the anisotropic ZnO NPs

ZnO can be synthesized into various novel structures due to the loose packing of tetrahedral structures and the different ionic radii of Zn^{2+} (74 picometers) and O^{2−} (140 picometers). This causes large open spaces inside the hexagonal ZnO structure and makes it possible to control the shape of nanostructured particles. The growth of ZnO structures depends on various conditions, for example, the pH of the solvent, temperature, duration of growth, and nature of the solvent.

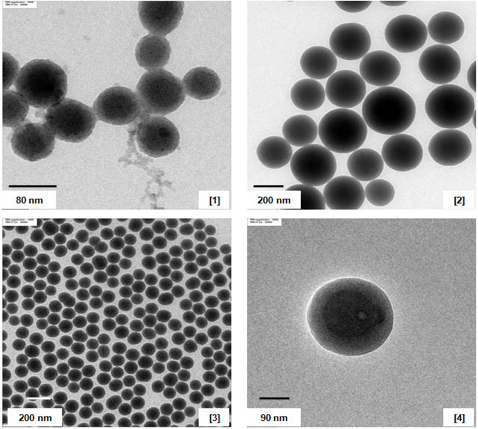
TEM images of SiO_{2} NPs synthesized by the Stoeber method

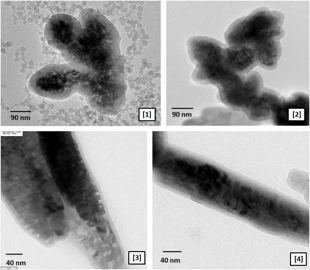
TEM micrographs showing the silica-coated anisotropic ZnO NPs

Besides the concentration effect on particle size, it can also affect particle shape. A study by Masuda et al., synthesizing ZnO nanoparticles from zinc acetate [Zn(CH_{3}COO)_{2}] and ammonia precursors, shows that the morphology of ZnO crystals is controlled by the ratio of ammonia to zinc acetate, NH_{3}:Zn. This alters the supersaturation point of crystallization. The reaction is demonstrated in Figure.

Zinc acetate [Zn(CH_{3}COO)_{2}] solution is prepared in ethanol under vigorous stirring until zinc acetate is dissolved in ethanol at a temperature of around 50 °C. Then ethanol is added and continuously stirred at a temperature of around 80 °C for half an hour. After that, the solution is cooled to room temperature. NaOH in ethanol solution is prepared by vigorous stirring at 50 °C and then added to prepared zinc acetate in ethanol at room temperature. After that, ZnO seeds are put in hexamethylenetetramine (HMT) solution, commonly called hexamine, for the growth process. Hexamine is a water-soluble chemical, and the growth process can be done in the temperature range of 55–95 °C. After ZnO nanoparticles are grown to the desired shape, the particles will be coated with silica particles using the Stoeber method. The process is carried out in an ammonia-catalyzed reaction of TEOS in an ethanol-water solution. Polyvinylpyrrolidone (PVP) can be added optionally for stabilization purposes. A hydrolysis reaction is initiated to form silica nanoparticles coated on ZnO nanoparticles.

==== ZnO Nanorods ====
The center has been studying the hydrothermal growth process of ZnO nanorods for the last few years. A typical process was carried out in a sealed chemical bath containing an equimolar solution of zinc nitrate hexahydrate and hexamethylene tetramine at a temperature of 95 °C for a period of up to 20 hours. The thickness and length of the nanowires can be controlled by using different concentrations of the starting reactants and growth durations. A 0.5 mM chemical bath yielded nanowires with an average diameter of around 50 nm, while a 25 mM bath resulted in wires with a thickness of up to about 1μm. The length of the wires depends both on the concentration of the precursor solution as well as the growth duration, and in 20 hours, nanowires as long as 10 μm can be grown.

This center has considerable experience in the fabrication of ZnO nanorods, nanowires, and nanotubes. ZnO nanoplates that are now being used for specific applications Over the last few years, have acquired considerable expertise in the control of the aspect ratio and spacing of ZnO nanorods. Recently, inkjet printing was used to make arrays of ZnO nanorods.5

== News ==
=== August 2010 ===
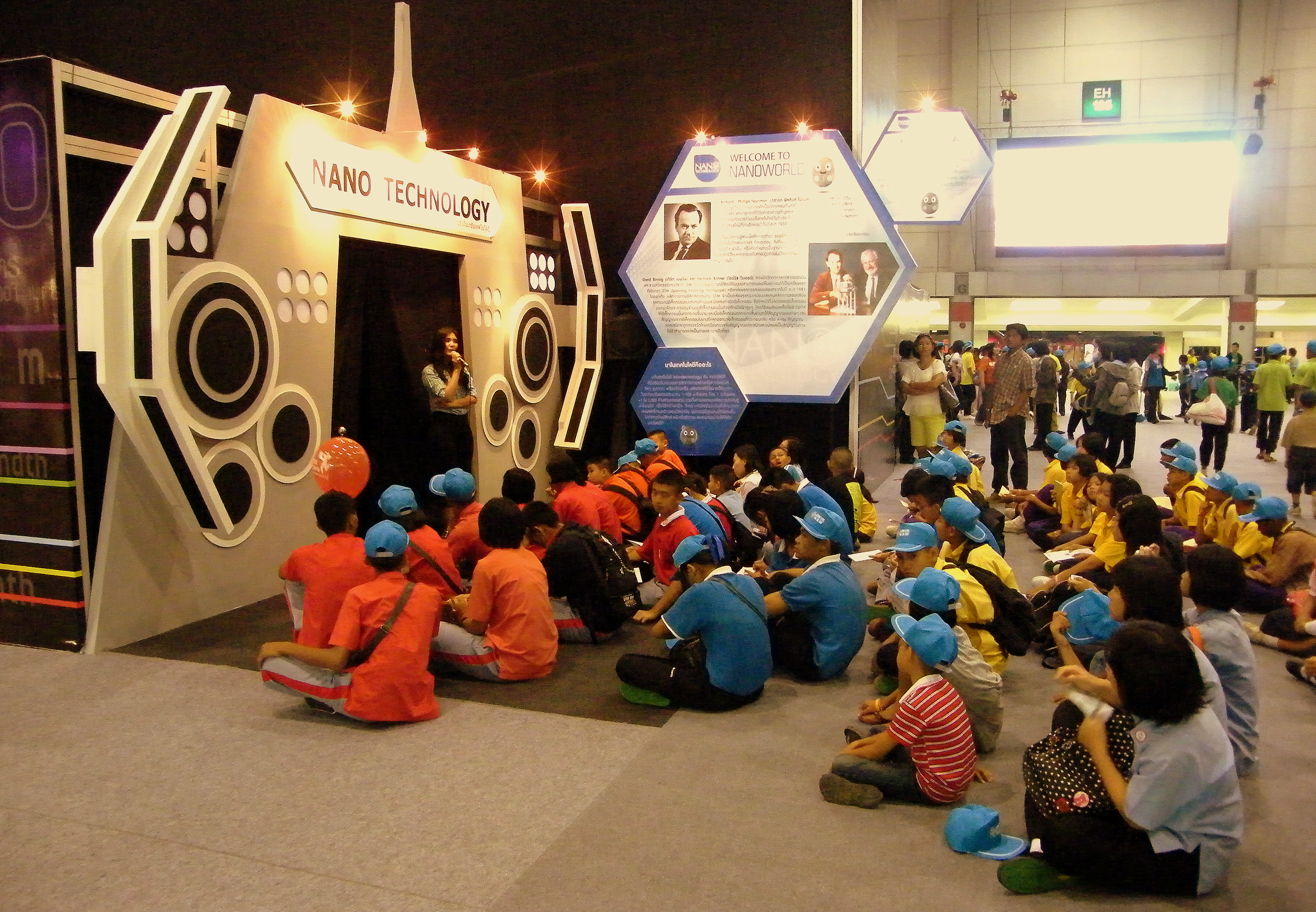
Introducing the younger generation to the fascinating world of nanotechnology

9 August 2010: National Science and Technology Fair 2010 (NSTF 2010):

The Center of Excellence in Nanotechnology at AIT got actively involved in designing and conceptualizing the Nanotechnology Pavilion at the 2010 National Science and Technology Fair, which is being held until 22 August at the Bangkok International Trade and Exhibition Center (BITEC), Bang Na, Bangkok.

With this year's slogan "Towards a better society with Science and Technology," the National Science and Technology Fair 2010 was formally inaugurated by Dr. Virachai Virameteekul, Minister of Science and Technology, Thailand, on 7 August 2010. The fair covered a total area of 42,000 square meters on the grounds of the Bangkok International Trade and Exhibition Center (BITEC), Bang Na, Bangkok. With 7 ministries, 11 private enterprises, 5 major science societies, and 30 agencies from different universities participating from Thailand and more than 10 agencies participating from overseas, it is the largest science and technology fair held in Thailand. Around a million visitors, consisting mainly of school and university students from different parts of the country, are expected to visit the fair by its final day on 22 August 2010.

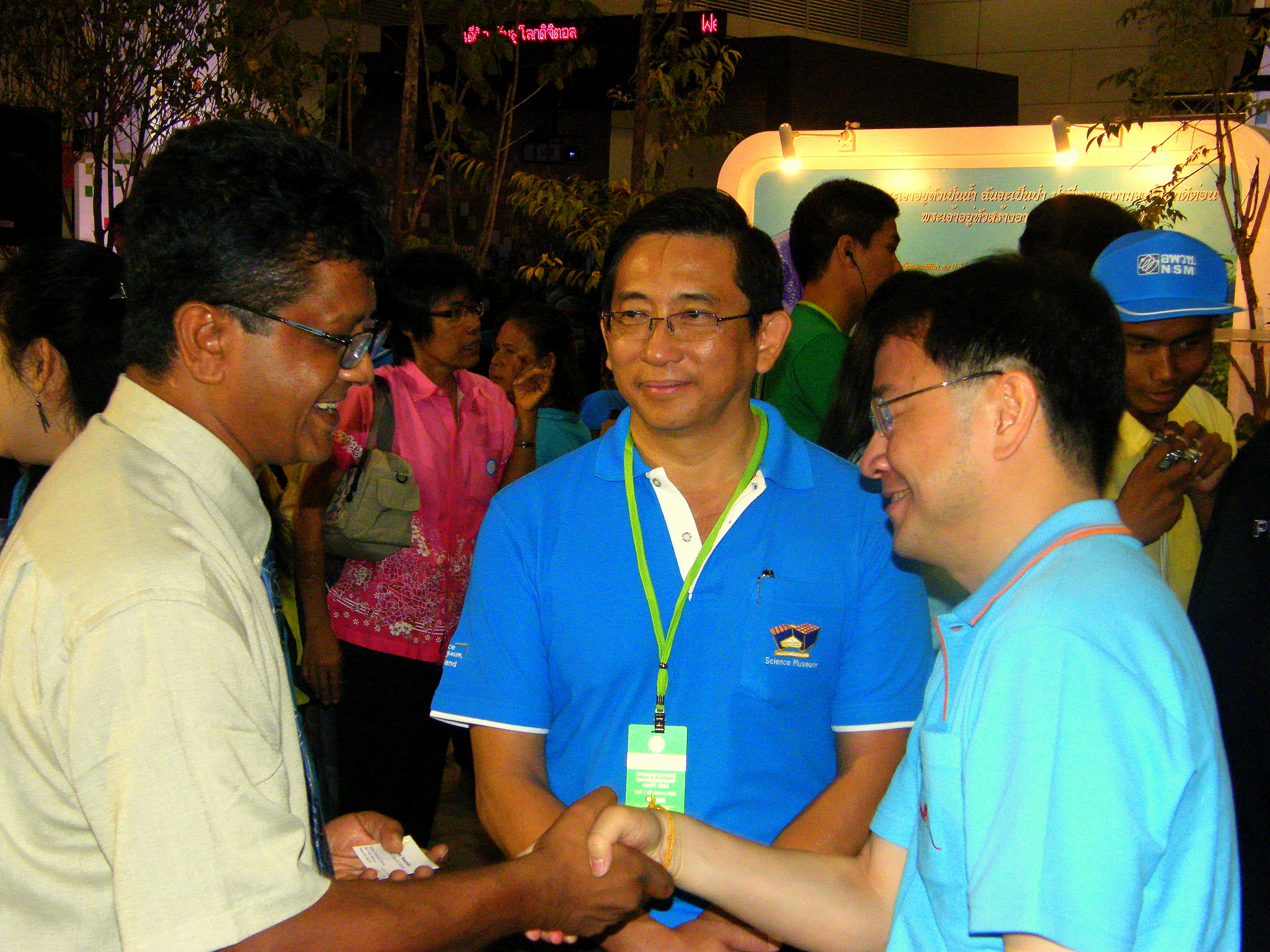
Prof. Joydeep Dutta, Director of CoEN at AIT and current Vice President-Academic Affairs, AIT (left) with Dr. Pichai Sonchaeng, President of the National Science Museum of Thailand (middle) and Dr. Virachai Virameteekul, Minister of Science and Technology, Government of Thailand (right) at the National Science and Technology Fair 2010.

The participants were categorized into nine exhibition and activity sections, namely the Royal Pavilion, Ministry Pavilion, International Pavilion, University Pavilion, Science Associations, Private Enterprises, Thematic Exhibition, Activity for Youth Zones, and Academic Conference/Seminar/Workshop.

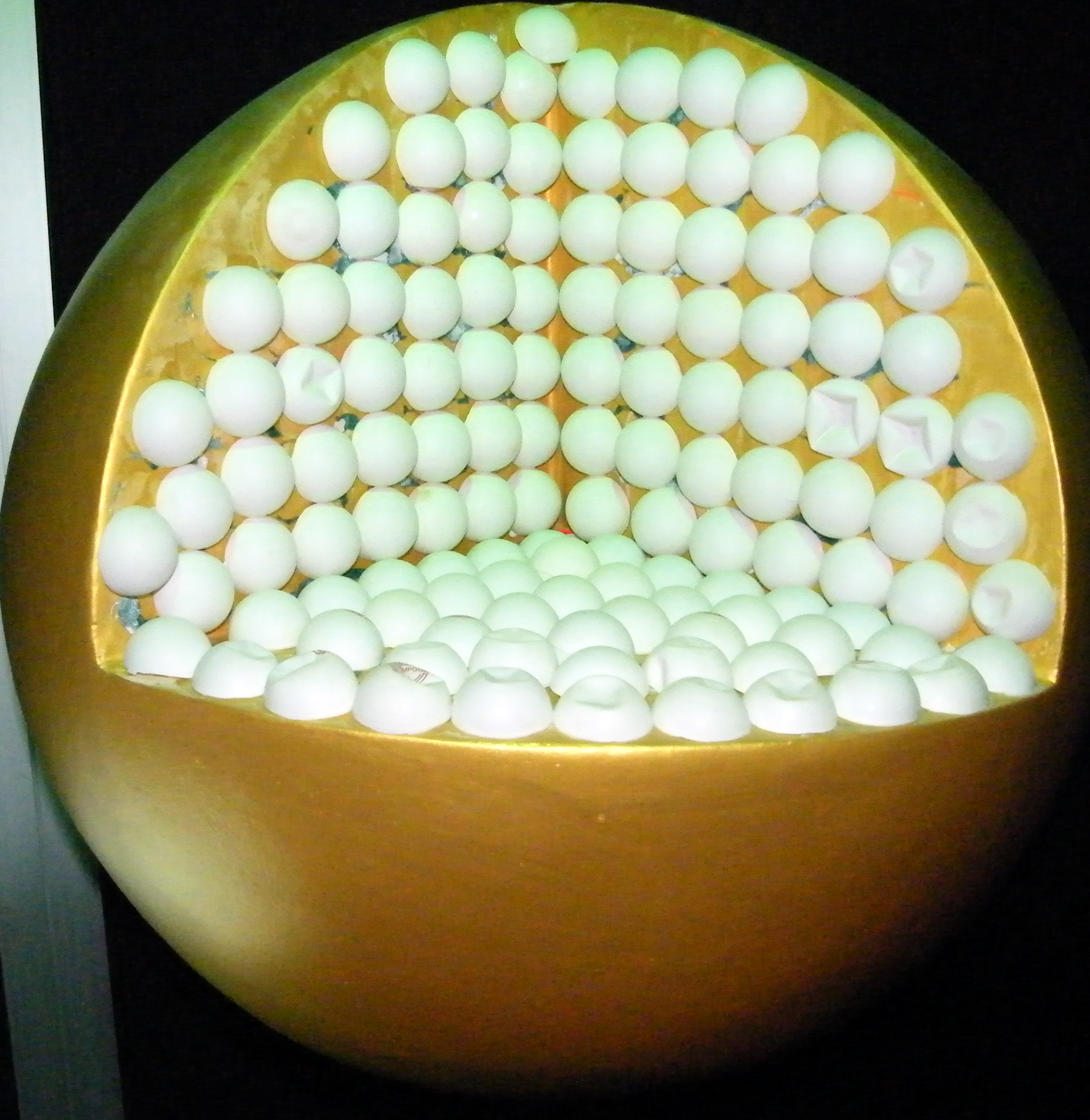
Model showing a section of NPs with the atoms aligned in the crystal

The Center of Excellence in Nanotechnology at AIT (CoEN at AIT), in collaboration with the National Science Museum, Thailand, helped in conceptualizing and designing the Nanotechnology Pavilion set up under the section: Thematic Exhibition. The exhibits at the pavilion, many of which were provided by CoEN at AIT, were designed to introduce the students to a whole new world of nanotechnology through simple demonstrations and hands-on activities. Children were busy with activities, such as making their own C_{60} fullerene (Bucky Ball) model using magnetic legos, trying to understand how surface to volume ratio increases with size minimization using building blocks, playing with a model explaining nanostructures, etc. For the more mature audience, a variety of information in the form of videos explaining the concept of scale and demonstrating ZnO-based LPG gas sensors, etc. was provided at the Pavilion.

With the growing popularity of nanotechnology in Thailand and, in many ways, due to the active involvement of Prof. Joydeep Dutta, the Director of CoEN at AIT and the current Vice President for Academic Affairs at AIT, in promoting nanotechnology-based research in Thailand, it was no wonder to see students from various schools and colleges taking a keen interest in what many believe is the technology of the future.

== Publications ==
Members of the center have published research papers in different journals and books were released in 2008 and 2009. A list of major publications from 2005 onward is given below.

=== Books ===
- G. Louis Hornyak, Joydeep Dutta, Harry F. Tibbals and Anil K. Rao, 2008, Introduction to NanoScience, CRC Press of Taylor and Francis Group LLC (ISBN 14-2004-8058)
- G. Louis Hornyak, Joydeep Dutta, John J. Moore and Harry F. Tibbals, 2009, Fundamentals of NanoTechnology, CRC Press of Taylor and Francis Group LLC (ISBN 14-2004-8031)
- G. Louis Hornyak, Joydeep Dutta, John J. Moore and Harry F. Tibbals, 2009, Introduction to Nanoscience & Nanotechnology, CRC Press of Taylor and Francis Group LLC (ISBN 14-2004-7795)

=== Book chapters ===
- Nanoparticle Applications for Environmental Control and Remediation, S. Baruah, Rungrot Kitsaboonloha, Myo Myint Zar and J. Dutta, Nanoparticles: Synthesis, Characterization and Applications Edited by R. S. Chaughule and R. V. Ramanujan, American Scientific Publishers, Valencia, California, USA, (2009), Chapter 12 (22 Pages), in Press
- Nanotechnology for Agriculture, Food Systems and the Environment, S. Baruah, S. L. Ranamukhaarachchi and J. Dutta, The Age of Nanotechnology (2009), ed. Nirmala Rao Khadpekar, The ICFAI University Press, Hyderabad, India, in press
- Nanomaterials for Energy Conversion Applications, V. Renugopalakrishnan, A. M. Kannan, S. Srinivasan, V. Thavasi, S. Ramakrishna, P. Li, A. Mershin, S. Filipek, A. Kumar, J. Dutta, A. Jaya, L. Munukutla, S. Velumani, and G. F. Audette, Nanomaterials for Energy Storage Applications, Ed. H. S. Nalwa, American Scientific Publishers, Stevens Ranch, CA, USA, Ch. 5, pages 155–178, 2008
- Pollution Treatment, Remediation, and Sensing, A. Sugunan and J. Dutta, Nanotechnology, Volume 2: Environmental Aspects (2008), Krug, Harald (ed.), Wiley-VCH, Weinheim, Germany- ISBN 978-3-527-31735-6, pg. 125–146
- Nanotechnology for Agriculture and Food Systems- A view, H. Warad and J. Dutta, The Age of Nanotechnology (2007), page 206–220, ed. Nirmala Rao Khadpekar, The ICFAI University Press, Hyderabad, India (ISBN 81-314-0828-0)

== Recreation center – A Little Nano Band ==
With the initiatives of a visiting faculty member to CoEN, Prof. Gabor L. Hornyak, Vice President, NanoThread, Inc., a small band named A Little Nano Band was created. With the professor himself on bass or piano, Bo Tay on rhythm guitar, Tanujjal Bora on drums, Htet Kyaw on tambourine, and Ajaya Sapkota or Mayuree Jaisai on vocals, the band plays covers of songs from 1960s classics to present-day pop music. The cultural diversity of the institution enables the band to select songs from different languages and play them to a vast group of listeners.
