= UNESCO Science Prize =

- Awarded for: "an outstanding contribution made to the technological development of a developing member state or region through the application of scientific and technological research (particularly in the fields of education, engineering and industrial development)"
- Presented by: United Nations Educational, Scientific and Cultural Organization (UNESCO)
- First award: 1968

The UNESCO Science Prize is a biennial scientific prize awarded by the United Nations Educational, Scientific and Cultural Organization (UNESCO) to "a person or group of persons for an outstanding contribution they have made to the technological development of a developing member state or region through the application of scientific and technological research (particularly in the fields of education, engineering and industrial development)."

The candidates for the Science Prize are proposed to the Director-General of UNESCO by the governments of member states or by non-governmental organizations. All proposals are judged by a panel of six scientists and engineers. The prize consists of US$ $15,000, an Albert Einstein Silver Medal, and is awarded in odd years to coincide with UNESCO's General Conference.

== Past Laureates ==
- 1968: Robert Simpson Silver (United Kingdom) "for his discovery of a process for the demineralization of sea water."
- 1970: International Maize and Wheat Improvement Centre (Mexico) and International Rice Research Institute (Philippines) "for their work which made it possible to produce, in the space of a few years, improved strains of cereals."
- 1972: Viktor Kovda (Soviet Union) "for his theory on the hydromorphic origin of the soils of the great plains of Asia, Africa, Europe and the Americas" and nine researchers from Austria "for their development of the L-D process designed for recovery of steel from low phosphorus pig iron."
- 1976: Alfred Champagnat (France) "for his findings on the low-cost mass production of new proteins from petroleum."
- 1978: A team of research workers from the Lawes Agricultural Trust (United Kingdom) "for their work on synthetic insecticides related to natural pyrethrum."
- 1980: Leonardo Mata (Costa Rica) "for his work on the relationship between malnutrition and infection, particularly in infants" and Vincent Barry's group of scientists from the Medical Research Council (Ireland) (Ireland) "for their work on the synthesis of an anti-leprosy agent, B-633."
- 1983: Roger Whitehead (United Kingdom) "for his work on the role of maternal nutrition and lactation in infant growth."
- 1985: A group of six scientists from the Commonwealth Scientific and Industrial Research Organisation (Australia) "for their work on the biological control of Salvinia molesta infestations in the Sepik River Basin of Papua New Guinea."
- 1987: Yuan Longping (China) "for his work leading to the creation of an hybrid rice with high yield potential."
- 1989: Johanna Döbereiner (Brazil) "for her work in exploiting biological nitrogen fixation as the major source of nitrogen in tropical agriculture."
- 1991: A group of researchers and engineers from the Instituto Tecnológico Venezolano del Petróleo (Venezuela) "for their contribution to the development of hydrocracking distillation and hydrotreatment technology."
- 1993: Octavio Novaro (Mexico) for his contribution to the phenomenon of catalysis.
- 1995: Wang Xuan (China) "for his contribution to the Chinese photocomposition system".
- 1997: Marcos Moshinsky (Mexico) "for his work in nuclear physics."
- 1999: Atta ur Rahman (Pakistan) "for his work in organic chemistry which has contributed to the development of plant-based therapies for cancer, AIDS and diabetes" and José Leite Lopes (Brazil) "for his contribution to the development of physics in Latin America."
- 2001: Baltasar Mena Iniesta (Mexico/Spain) "for his ability to relate his research in rheology and new materials to technological applications."
- 2003: Somchart Soponronnarit (Thailand) "for research on areas of renewable energy and drying technology."
- 2005: Alexander Balankin (Mexico/Russia) "for his pioneer contributions in development of fractal mechanics and improving exploration techniques for the oil industry".
