= Baltasar Mena Iniesta =

Mexican-Spanish rheologist mechanical engineer (born 1942)

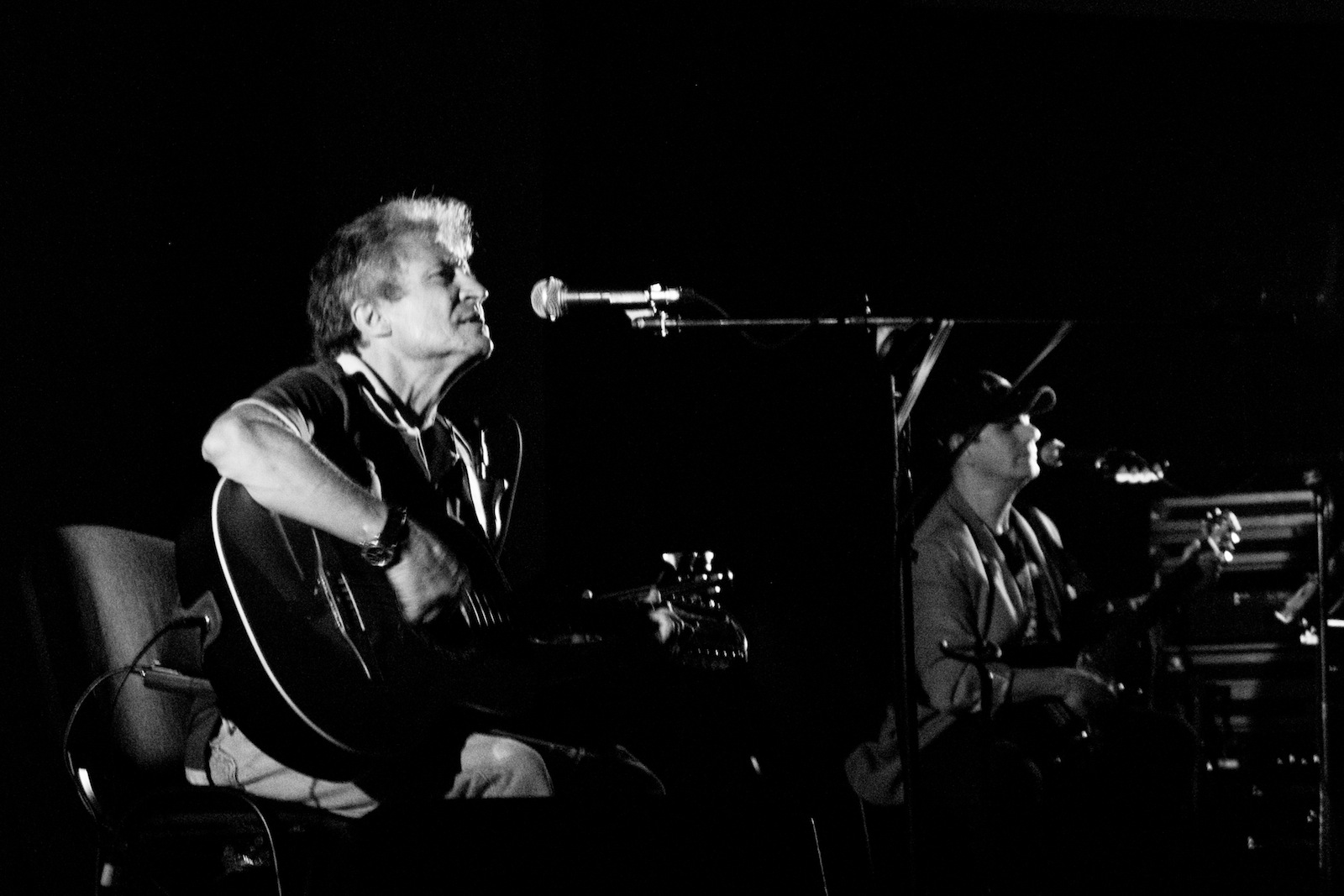
- Born: 1942 (age 83–84); Spain
- Education: National Autonomous University of Mexico, University of Toulouse and Brown University.
- Awards: National Prize for Arts and Sciences (Technology and Design, 1997); UNESCO Science Prize (2001)
- Scientific career
- Fields: Rheology
- Workplaces: Faculty of Engineering, National Autonomous University of Mexico (UNAM)

Baltasar Mena Iniesta (born 1942) is a Spanish-born Mexican mechanical engineer specialized in Rheology. He has been laureated with Mexico's National Prize for Arts and Sciences (1997), UNESCO Science Prize (2001), and has chaired both the International Committee on Rheology (1984–88) and the Mexican Society of Rheology (1976–97).

Mena graduated with a bachelor's degree in mechanical engineering from the National Autonomous University of Mexico (UNAM, 1964); specialized in Fluid Mechanics at the University of Toulouse (France, 1967); and earned both a master's degree and a Ph.D. in mechanical engineering from Brown University (United States, 1969–1973), where he also received the Brown Engineering Alumni Medal in 2000.

He has developed several patents, including an oscillatory die for polymer extrusion used by the henequen industry in the Yucatan Peninsula and an hexagonal solar-powered grain elevator used in Mexico, India and Southeast Asia. According to UNESCO, such design has saved millions of dollars yearly by preventing post-harvest losses.

Aside from his academic activities, Mena is also a veteran rock musician, having toured since 1959 with Los Sonámbulos, Los Sinners and Tequilas. Since 1976 he is the lead singer and guitarist of Naftalinas, a band with seven albums and over a hundred live performances.
