= Marcos Moshinsky =

Ukrainian-Mexican physicist (1921–2009)

- Born: April 20, 1921; Kyiv, Ukrainian SSR
- Died: 1 April 2009 (aged 87); Mexico City, Mexico
- Education: National Autonomous University of Mexico (BS); Princeton University (PhD)
- Known for: Transformation parenthesis for harmonic oscillator functions
- Awards: Prince of Asturias Award for Scientific and Technical Investigation (1988); UNESCO Science Prize (1997); Wigner Medal (1998)
- Scientific career
- Fields: Elementary particles
- Workplaces: National Autonomous University of Mexico
- Doctoral advisor: Eugene Paul Wigner

Marcos Moshinsky Borodiansky (Russian: Маркос Мошинский Бородянский; Ukrainian: Маркос Мошинскі; 1921–2009) was a Mexican physicist of Ukrainian Jewish origin whose work in the field of elementary particles won him the Prince of Asturias Prize for Scientific and Technical Investigation in 1988 and the UNESCO Science Prize in 1997.

== Early life ==
He was born in 1921 into a Jewish family in Kyiv, Ukrainian SSR. At the age of three, he emigrated as a refugee to Mexico, where he became a naturalized citizen in 1942. He received a bachelor's degree in physics from the National Autonomous University of Mexico (UNAM) and a doctorate in the same discipline at Princeton University under Nobel Laureate Eugene Paul Wigner.

== Career ==
In the 1950s he researched nuclear reactions and the structure of the atomic nucleus, introducing the concept of the transformation bracket for eigenstates of the quantum harmonic oscillator, which, together with the tables elaborated in collaboration with Thomas A. Brody, simplified calculations in the nuclear shell model and became an indispensable reference for the study of nuclear structure. In 1952, his work on the transient dynamics of matter waves led to the discovery of diffraction in time.

After completing postdoctoral studies at the Henri Poincaré Institute in Paris, France, he returned to Mexico City to serve as a professor at the UNAM. In 1967 he was chosen president of the Mexican Society of Physics and in 1972 he was admitted to the National College. He was the editor of several international scientific reviews, including the Bulletin of the Atomic Scientists, and authored four books and more than 200 technical papers. He received the Mexican National Prize for Science (1968), the Luis Elizondo Prize (1971), the Prince of Asturias Prize for Scientific and Technical Investigation (1988) and the UNESCO Science Prize (1997).

In 1990 he was elected a Fellow of the American Physical Society "for his many fundamental contributions to the description of many-body quantum systems through the use of group-theoretical techniques".

While practicing physics, he wrote a weekly column in the newspaper Excélsior on Mexican politics.
