= Hidalgo (state) =

State of Mexico

Hidalgo Dalgo (Otomí)
- State
- Free and Sovereign State of Hidalgo; Estado Libre y Soberano de Hidalgo (Spanish); Tlahtohcayotl Hidalgo (Nahuatl); Hyodi Dalgo (Otomí)
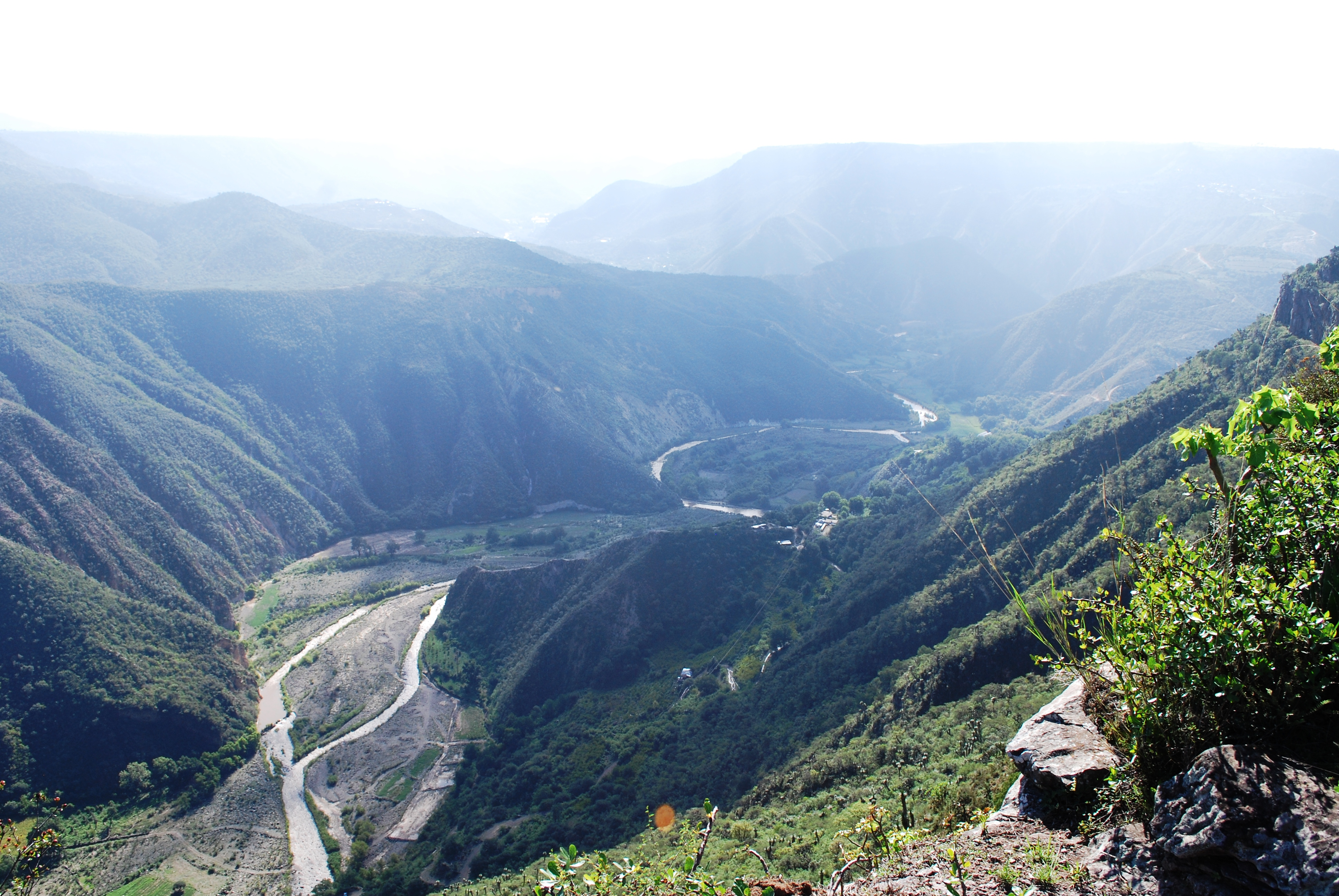
- The Barranca de Metztitlán

- Coat of arms

- State of Hidalgo within Mexico
- Interactive map of Hidalgo
- Country: Mexico
- Capital and largest city: Pachuca de Soto
- Municipalities: 84
- Admission: 16 January 1869
- Order: 26th

Government
  - Governor: Julio Menchaca
  - Senators: Simey Olvera Bautista (MRN) Cuauhtémoc Ochoa Fernández (MRN) Carolina Viggiano Austria (PRI)
  - Deputies: Federal Deputies: • Fortunato Rivera Castillo; • Cipriano Charrez Pedraza; • Lolis Jiménez Ramírez; • María Isabel Alfaro Morales; • Julio César Ángeles Mendoza; • Lidia García Anaya; • Miguel Ángel Pérez Navarrete; • Gloria Romero León; • Hugo Rafael Ruiz Lustre; • María Solís

Area
  - Total: 20,813 km^{2} (8,036 sq mi)
- Ranked 26th
- Highest elevation: 3,350 m (10,990 ft)

Population (2020)
  - Total: 3,082,841
  - Rank: 17th
  - Density: 148.12/km^{2} (383.63/sq mi)
  - Rank: 8th
- Demonym: Hidalguense

GDP
  - Total: MXN 482 billion (US$24.0 billion) (2022)
  - Per capita: US$7,530 (2022)
- Time zone: UTC−6 (Central)
- Postal code: 42000-43000
- Area code: Area codes 1, 2 and 3: • 427; • 441; • 483; • 591; • 736; • 738; • 743; • 745; • 746; • 748; • 759; • 761; • 763; • 771; • 772; • 773; • 774; • 775; • 776; • 778; • 779; • 789; • 791
- ISO 3166 code: MX-HID
- HDI: ▲0.772 high Ranked 25th of 32
- Website: Official Web Site

Hidalgo, (Note: Spanish pronunciation: [iˈðalɣo]) officially the Free and Sovereign State of Hidalgo, (Note: Spanish: Estado Libre y Soberano de Hidalgo) is one of the 31 states which, along with Mexico City, constitute the 32 federal entities of Mexico. It is divided into 84 municipalities and its capital city is Pachuca de Soto. It is located in east-central Mexico and is bordered by San Luis Potosí and Veracruz on the north, Puebla on the east, Tlaxcala and State of Mexico on the south and Querétaro on the west.

In 1869, Benito Juárez created the State of Hidalgo and made Pachuca its capital city; "de Soto" was added later in recognition of Manuel Fernando Soto, who is considered the most important driving force in creating the state. The state was named after Miguel Hidalgo y Costilla, the initiator of the Mexican War of Independence.

The indigenous peoples of the state, such as the Otomi, retain much of their traditional culture. In addition to Mexicans of Spanish descent, there are also notable immigrant cultures: those of the descendants of Cornish miners from Cornwall (located in South West England) who arrived in the 19th century, a few self-proclaimed Italian descendants, and a small Jewish enclave which claims to be descended from Sephardi Jews which came to New Spain in the 16th century.

Hidalgo is known for its mountainous terrain, though part of the state is on a coastal plain. With a population of 2.858 million and an area of roughly 20,813 square km, Hidalgo is one of Mexico's smaller states. The state contains a number of ecotourism, cultural and archeological attractions including the Huasteca area, the ruins of Tula, natural hot water springs, old haciendas and mountain ranges.

== History ==
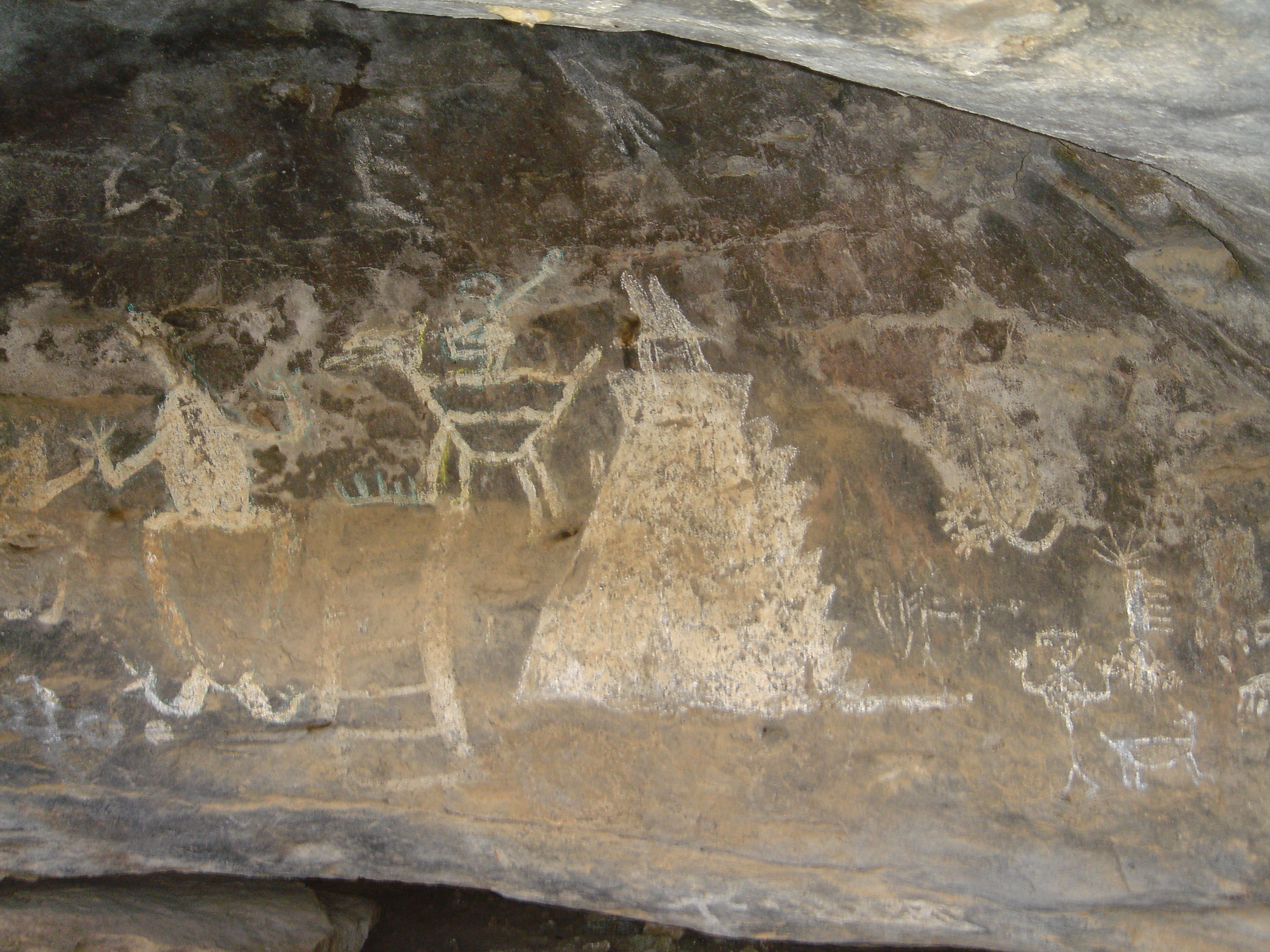
Cave paintings in Huichapan

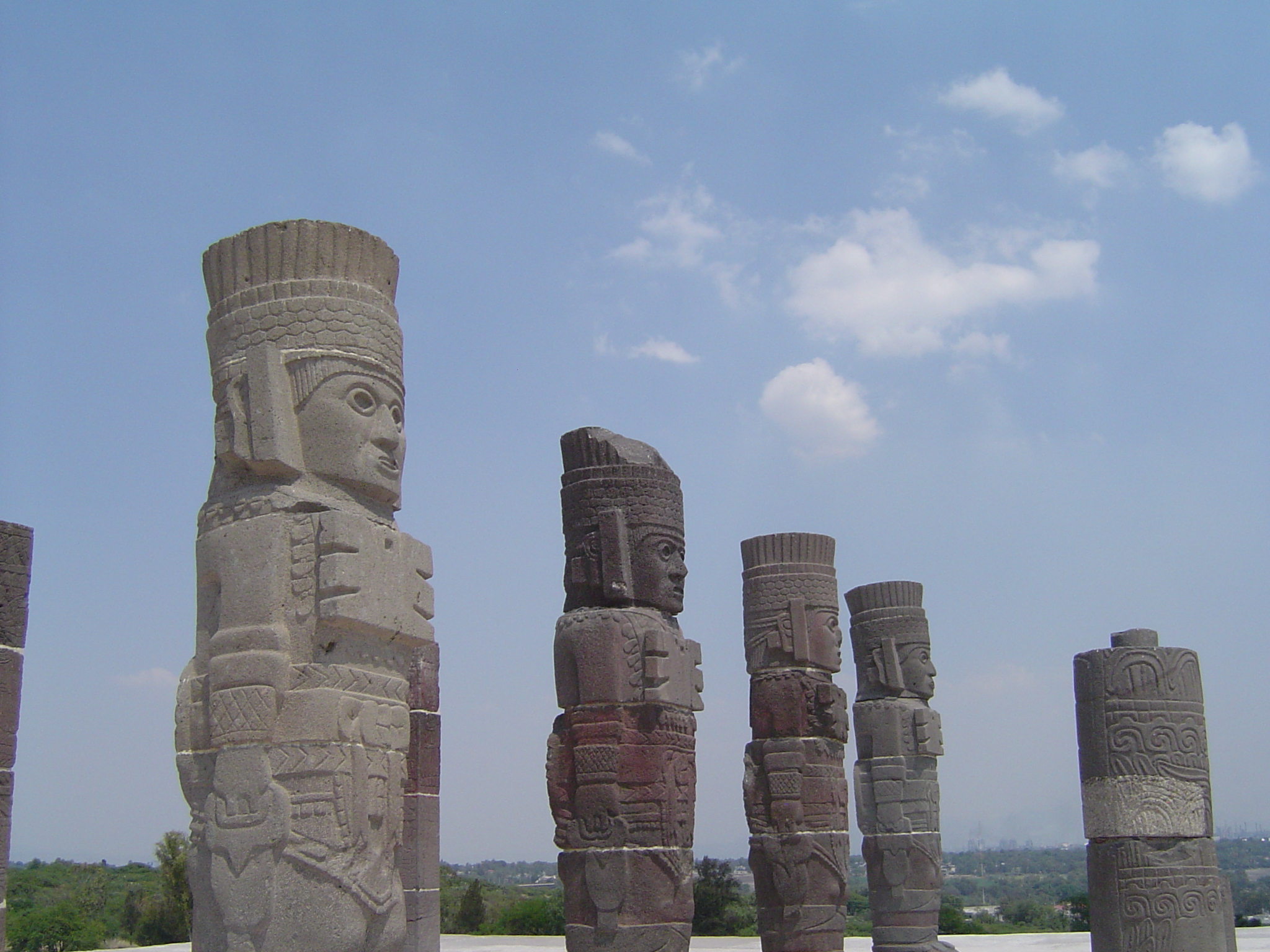
Atlantes at the Tula archeological site

Prehistoric artifacts have been found in the Hidalgo regions of Tepeapulco, Tulancingo, Actopan and Huichapan. Their antiquity ranges from 14,000 to 2,500 B.C.E. The oldest evidence of Hidalguense occupation has been found in Huapalcalco in the municipality of Tulancingo The first settlers of these territories were Olmec groups, who exploited deposits of jade and serpentine. Exploitation of obsidian cobbled relief, as in the deposits of the Sierra de las Navajas, developed during the Mesoamerican Preclassic period. The first evidence of social stratification in Hidalgo has been found at La Loma in the municipality of Tepeji del Río de Ocampo.

The modern day state of Hidalgo is located within the pre-Hispanic region of Mesoamerica. Numerous migrations of indigenous people took place through here, mostly arriving or passing through from the north, with many eventually settling in the Valley of Mexico. The Toltecs initially settled in Xochicoatlán, now the municipality of Molango, at the beginning of the 7th century. From here they dispersed to locales such as Huejutla and Tollatzingo (now called Tulancingo) where they eventually had their capital of Tollan, today known as Tula.

The Toltecs were eventually overrun by Chichimecas, who established their capital in Metztitlán. The Aztecs arrived in the 12th century, initially establishing themselves in Mixquiahuala, then founding Tizayuca later. Eventually, the Aztecs took over most of what is now the southern portion of the state, incorporating it into the Aztec Empire. By this time, the state was a mix of Otomi, Nahua and nomadic Chichimec (probably Pame or Chichimeca Jonaz) communities, with the Nahuas predominating in the eastern sierras, the Otomi in the west, and the Chichimecs scattered throughout most of the state. All three communities lived in close proximity in the southern portions of the state.

After the Spanish conquest of the Aztec Empire, the conquistadors carved out territories for themselves from Aztec lands. Hernán Cortés took possession of lands to the northeast of Mexico City extending into modern Hidalgo state. Evangelization efforts followed soon thereafter with the first Franciscans arriving in 1523. This changed the social, economic and cultural structure of the areas as the Spanish took control of natural resources — especially minerals — and the labor the Indians provided. It also led to a massive decrease in the native population, especially during the governorship of the area by Nuño Beltrán de Guzmán. By the 18th century, the economy of the Hidalgo area was dominated by mining and agricultural haciendas. Much of the agricultural production during the colonial period was centered on livestock such as sheep and pigs as well as the making of pulque from the native maguey plant. However, the mining of silver, gold and other metals in the Pachuca/Real del Monte area would prove to be the economic backbone of the area through the colonial period and into most of post Independence period. The fortunes of the mining industry would rise and fall during the colonial period; one of the most productive eras came under the control of Pedro Romero de Terreros in the 18th century.

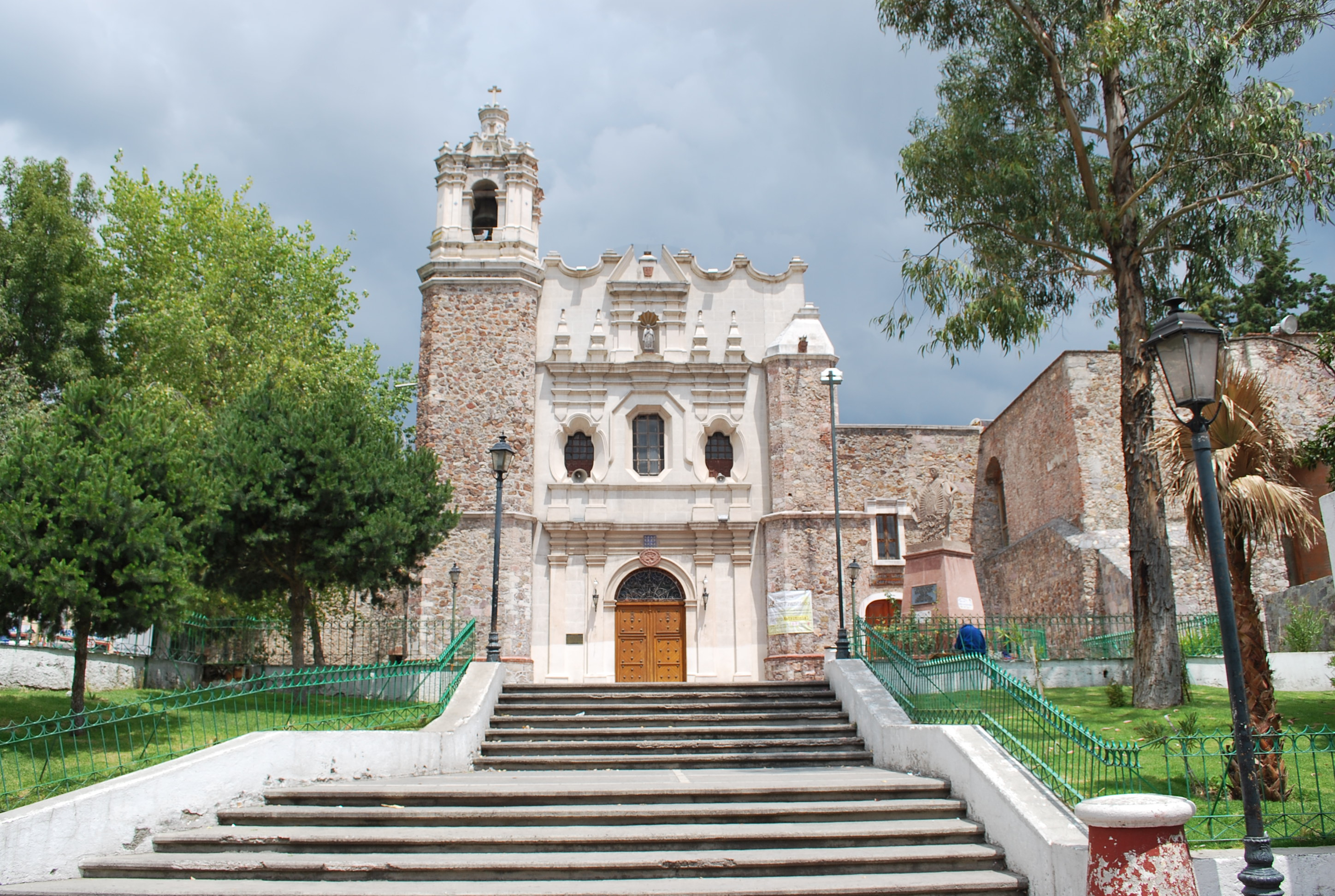
Monastery of San Francisco in Pachuca.

Despite Spanish control and evangelization efforts since the 16th century, many of the Otomi and other indigenous groups of the area had not been fully subjugated by the 18th century, especially in the Sierra Gorda and Sierra Baja areas. These groups and others manage a significant amount of success in maintaining cultural, political and economic autonomy through the colonial period. Much of the state still maintains a number of strong indigenous identities.

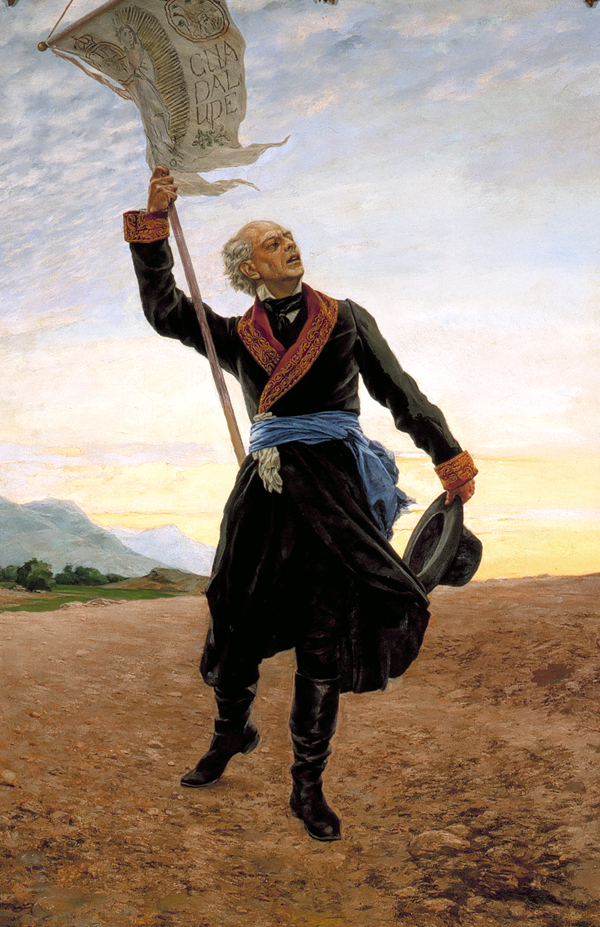
Miguel Hidalgo, the namesake of the state, waving a banner bearing the image of the Virgin of Guadalupe, patron saint of Mexico (1905 painting).

Many in Hidalgo, especially the indigenous, supported Miguel Hidalgo y Costilla's cause, providing leaders such as José María Correa and José Antonio Magos, both of whom were active in the Mezquital Valley area. However, no major battles of the Mexican War of Independence were fought in the state. Instead, a number of smaller operations against local Spaniards were conducted. When the war ended in 1821, the country was divided into a number of states. The modern state of Hidalgo was initially part of the very large territory called “Mexico” (which extended in all directions from Mexico City), which eventually was split with the remaining portion becoming the modern State of Mexico. What is now Hidalgo was originally the districts of Tula, Tulancingo and Huejutla of the former entity. The state of Hidalgo would not be formally created until the 1860s.

Silver Mines in the municipalities of Mineral del Monte, Mineral de la Reforma and Pachuca

The economic consequences to the mines of Pachuca and Real del Monte during the War of Independence were ruinous. In 1824, British mining companies were brought in to revive the sector. The British introduced steam-powered machinery and other modern techniques as well as a large quantity of Cornish miners. Many of these Cornish miners stayed and English names and foods such as pasties (called “pastes” in Spanish) help define the state, especially in the Pachuca and Real del Monte areas. These Englishmen were forced to sell their interest to Mexican capitalists in 1849, and the mining sector fell again.

In 1861, the government of the vast State of Mexico was centered in Toluca, west of Mexico City. The distance of the capital was one of the reasons why the state of Hidalgo would eventually separate. When French forces invaded central Mexico in 1862, the large territory of Mexico was divided into three military sectors for defence. The second district had its capital in Actopan and its borders were roughly commensurate with that of modern Hidalgo. The French succeeded in placing Maximilian I on the throne of Mexico, who visited Pachuca in 1865. Soon thereafter, insurgent activity against the French government intensified and after Maximilian was overthrown, the new republican government decided to make this military district the state of Hidalgo in 1869. The state was named after Miguel Hidalgo y Costilla, the first leader of the Mexican Independence movement.

From the establishment of the state until the Porfirio Díaz period, the economy, especially the mining sector was erratic. In the late 1880s, a number of modern inventions, such as the telegraph, telephone and railroad helped the Hidalgo economy. It also brought in another wave of foreign investment in the mining industry. By the mid-1900s, much of the mining production in Pachuca and Real del Monte was controlled by U.S. based interests such as the United States Mining Smelting and Refining Company. Pulque haciendas, primarily selling to nearby Mexico City, were prosperous in the late 19th and early 20th centuries. The prosperity of the state was best seen in the capital of Pachuca with the construction of many civic structures, but many rural areas were still quite impoverished. This situation would make the state favor the oncoming Mexican Revolution.

During the Mexican Revolution, local armed groups, such as the one led by Francisco P. Mariel in Huejutla, faced off against government troops. Forces led by Nicolas Flores took Jacala and threatened Zimapan and Ixmiquilpan in 1911. Later that same year Gabriel Hernández took Tulancingo and Pachuca, forcing the then-governor out of power. After Porfirio Díaz fled the country, several factions vied for power here. The government of the state was seized in 1915 by Agustin Sangins, who declared himself in favor of Victoriano Huerta, prompting opponents to take up arms in the Huasteca area, Jacala and Tulancingo. Victory initially went to those in support of Huerta. When Huerta's government fell, the state had a chaotic succession of governors, each of whom supported different factions. When the war finally wound down by 1920, the state had a new constitution. In 1920, the first airmail flight took place with a biplane piloted by Horacio Ruiz Gaviño taking off from Pachuca and landing in Mexico City 53 minutes later carrying 543 letters, 61 postcards and other items. The war left the mining industry in ruins again and the desertion of same by the American companies. Modernization of the nearly destroyed infrastructure began in the 1920s with the reconstruction of telephone lines and the construction of highways within the state. In the 1930s, a number of companies such as Cruz Azul Cement were expropriated and popular credit schemes such as the Banco de Credito Ejidal were created. Over 130 schools in rural areas were also built. Construction and modernization of infrastructure would continue through the rest of the 20th century. This wave of mining activity declined in the mid-20th century, causing the deterioration of the state's economy, especially in the Pachuca area. In the 1950s and 1960s efforts were undertaken to shift the state's economy from agriculture and mining to manufacturing. In 1952, an automotive motor production facility called Diesel Nacional (DINA) was constructed. The old Instituto Científico Literario Autónomo de Hidalgo was converted to the Universidad Autónoma del Estado de Hidalgo in 1961, with the purpose of turning out engineers and other professionals to provide the impetus for the development of industry. These efforts soon paid dividends and construction growth, especially of suburban subdivisions for workers in newly built factories.

The growth of the Greater Mexico City area reached the southern border of Hidalgo state in the late 20th and early 21st century with the municipality of Tizayuca formally added into the region in 2005.

One problem the extreme southern part of the state has had in the past decade is the contamination of water from the drainage of the Valley of Mexico. Mexico City pumps out excess water from the area, as the valley has no natural drainage, to the north into Mexico and Hidalgo states. This water is increasingly polluted and is causing damage to these northern zones. The state is negotiating federal and other help to treat and recycle this water so that it does not do further damage to state agriculture and environment.

At least 93 people, including eight children, were killed, and 46 were injured when a clandestine gasoline pipe exploded in Tlahuelilpan on January 19, 2019.

== Demographics ==
Historical population
Year	Pop.	±%
1895	563,824	—
1900	605,051	+7.3%
1910	646,551	+6.9%
1921	622,241	−3.8%
1930	677,772	+8.9%
1940	771,818	+13.9%
1950	850,394	+10.2%
1960	994,598	+17.0%
1970	1,193,845	+20.0%
1980	1,547,493	+29.6%
1990	1,888,366	+22.0%
1995	2,112,473	+11.9%
2000	2,235,591	+5.8%
2005	2,345,514	+4.9%
2010	2,665,018	+13.6%
2015	2,858,359	+7.3%
2020	3,082,841	+7.9%

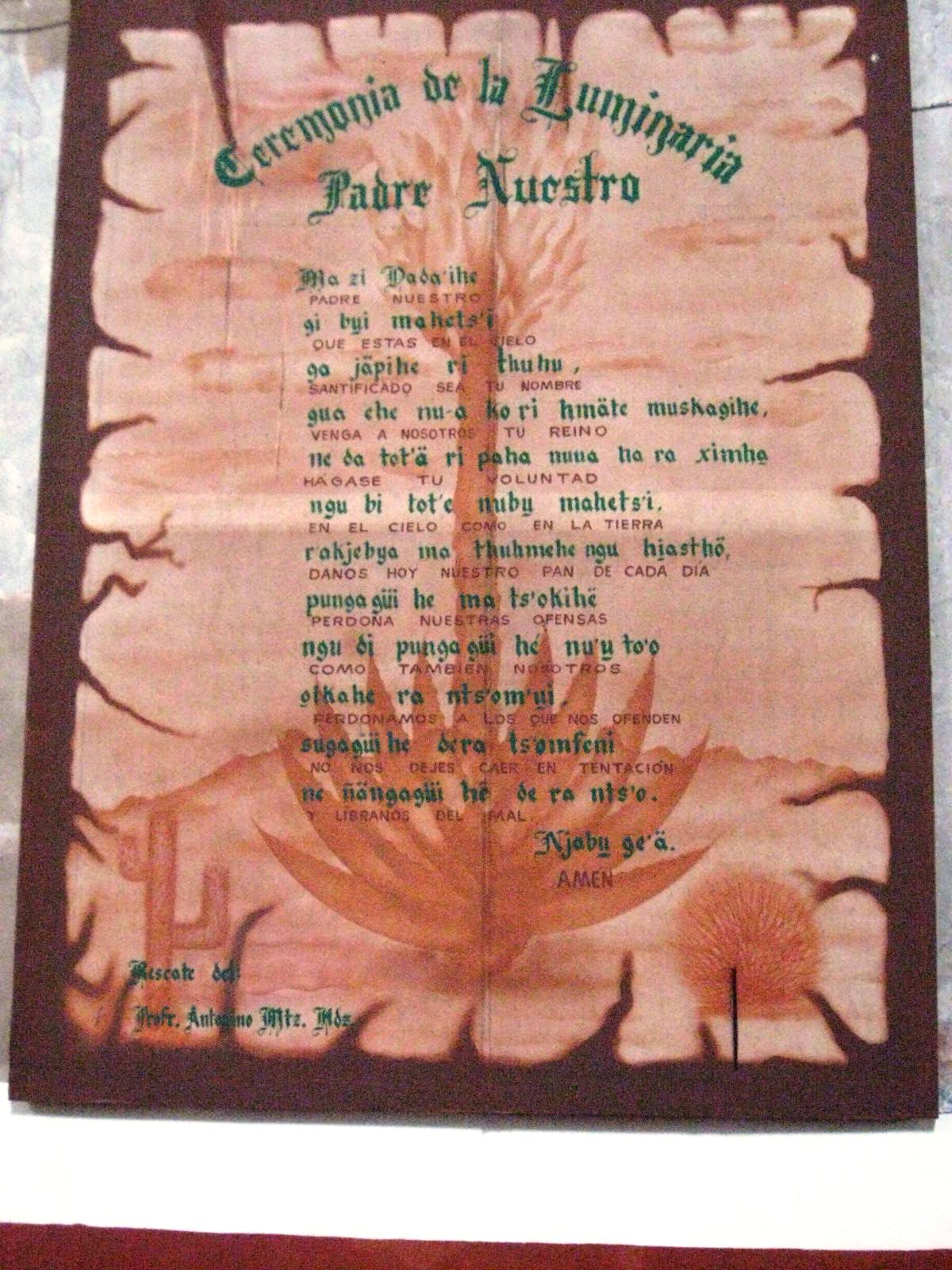
Lord's Prayer written in Spanish and Otomi at the Church of San Miguel in Ixmiquilpan

Several indigenous groups within the state have managed to maintain a relatively strong independent cultural identity since the Conquest. These ethnic groups include the Nahua, the Otomis and the Tepehuas, each still speaking their own language. The largest group is the Otomi, which has over 250,000 speakers in the state. The total number of people who speak an indigenous language of any kind was estimated at 320,029 in 2005.

According to the 2020 Census, 1.58% of Hidalgo's population identified as Black, Afro-Mexican, or of African descent.

Population of the state historically has risen and fallen based on the state of the economy especially, the health of the mining sector. When mining activity fell in the mid-20th century, the population fell as well. The population began to recover in the 1980s. From then until 2000, the population grew from 1,547,493 to 2,235,591, leaving the state with a large number of people under the age of thirty. The mining sector has also been responsible for immigration to the state, most notably that of the Cornish in the 19th century in the Pachuca and Real de Monte areas. While most descendants of these Cornish immigrants now are monolingual Spanish speakers, many have retained the Protestant faith. The Cornish have influenced the cuisine here as well, with one of Hidalgo's signature dishes being "pastes" (pa-stays), which are Cornish dough pockets filled with Mexican style meat, vegetable and sweet fillings.

Over 70% identify themselves as Catholic with significant minorities as Protestant or Evangelical. Another significant minority are those who practice the Jewish faith. Many of these claim ancestry from Sephardi Jews who came to New Spain in the 16th century to escape the Inquisition in Spain. When it reached New Spain, these people moved to the rural hills to continue their practice clandestinely. These are mostly concentrated in the community of Venta Prieta. While their claims have not been proven, there are indications that they are true. Most practitioners in Venta Prieta are Conservative.

=== Largest cities ===
Largest cities or towns in Hidalgo Source:
Rank		Municipality	Pop.
1	Pachuca	Pachuca de Soto	297,848
2	Tulancingo	Tulancingo de Bravo	106,163
3	Tizayuca	Tizayuca	60,265
4	Huejutla	Huejutla de Reyes	44,311
5	Ixmiquilpan	Ixmiquilpan	37,608
6	Tepeji	Tepeji del Río de Ocampo	36,618
7	Actopan	Actopan	32,276
8	Ciudad Sahagún	Tepeapulco	31,737
9	Zacualtipan	Zacualtipan de Ángeles	29,472
10	Tula	Tula de Allende	29,390

== Culture ==
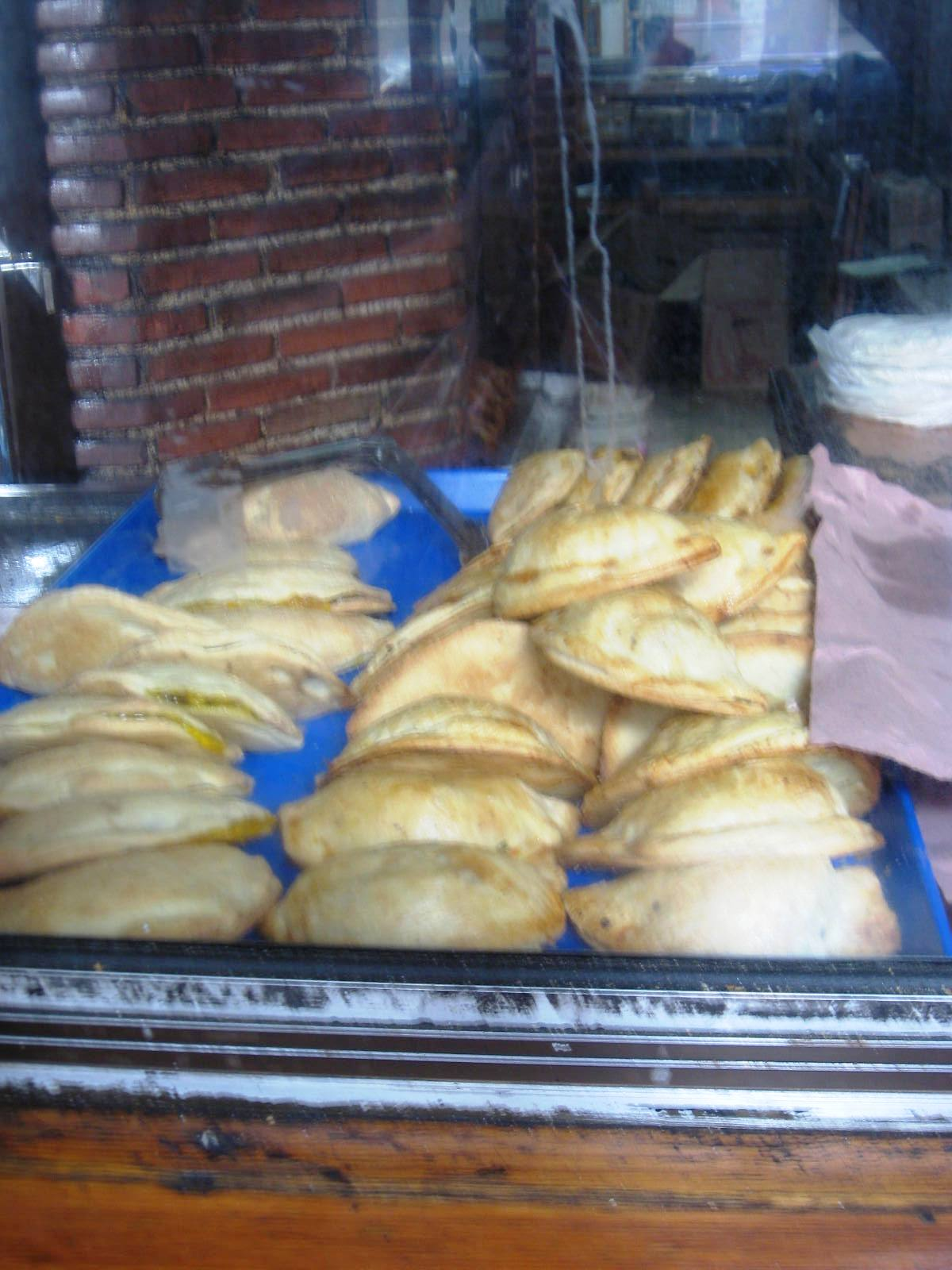
Baked pasties for sale in Pachuca

Hidalgo's literary history extends back to the 19th century with the oldest notable writers being Ignacio Rodríguez Galván and José María Rodríguez y Cos. Rodríguez Galván was born in 1816 in Tizayuca and is considered to be the first Mexican Romance writer. He wrote poetry and plays as well as founding a newspaper called Año Nuevo. Rodríguez y Cos was born in 1823 in Tulancingo and represents Positivism in Mexico, writing poetry and plays. The most important poet from the 20th century is Efrén Rebolledo from Actopán, who lived from 1877 to 1929. Other important writers from this century include Xavier Sorondo, Margarita Michelena, Gabriel Vargas, Ricardo Garibay, Gonzalo Martré and Miguel Ángel Granados Chapa Notable painters appear in the 20th century including Byron Galvez, Yadira Gutiérrez and José Hernández Delgadillo. The best known musician from the state is Nicandro Castillo, who wrote mostly popular music in the mid-20th century. As part of a performing group called Los Plateados, his work became part of a number of Mexican films, including Cuando habla el corazón, Seda, sangre y sol and Así se quiere en Jalisco. Other important musicians from the state include Abundio Martínez and Demetrio Vite Hernández.

The best known celebrity and artist from the state is Rodolfo Guzmán Huerta, better known as El Santo. Born in Tulancingo in 1917, not only was he Mexico's best known lucha libre wrestler, he experienced success in the movies, playing his lucha libre character battling evil. He never took off his mask in public, until a few weeks before his death in 1984.

Day of the Dead in the state is referred to as the "Xantolo" which extends from October 31 to November 2. Like in other parts of Mexico, the days around November 2 honor the dead with altars and offerings, although each community has its own variations. One area which is known for its traditions is Huejutla de Reyes, where altars dedicated to the dead are especially large and profusely decorated with flowers, colored paper and traditional foods, with the intention of counteracting mourning. In a number of areas, rituals based on Huasteca traditions are also performed. One of these is called the "Danza de Xantolo", in which masked figures in robes dance in candlelight. In other communities, youths in costume will dance from house to house, to be invited in to eat dishes prepared for the occasion. Another tradition is to have bands play at the cemeteries on November 2, where tombs are cleaned and decorated with flowers, garlands and more.

== Gastronomy ==
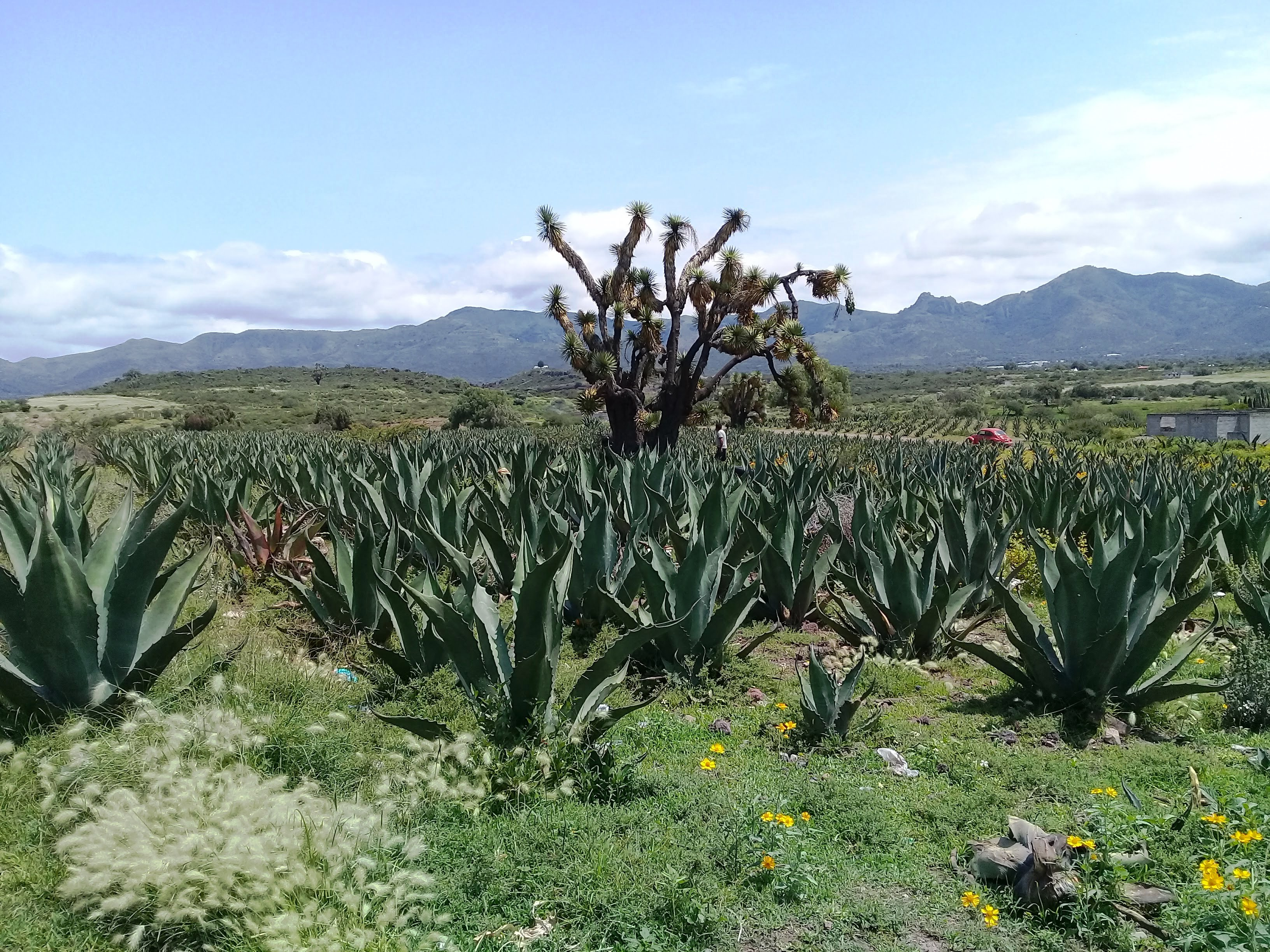
Mezquital Valley

The Mezquital Valley has best preserved the state's indigenous (especially Otomi) culinary heritage, based on a number of traditional native animal and vegetable products. One of these is the use of a number of edible insects, many of which are considered delicacies such as escamoles (ant eggs) and maguey larvae as well as others such as larvae found on nopal plants, "chacas" (beetles) and "chicharras" (cicadas). Other local animals still used for food include tadpoles (called atepocates), salamanders and their larvae, squirrels and rabbits. Plant species still commonly used include mesquite beans, nopal and other cactus, and various cactus fruit such as "tunas" (cactus pears) and "xoconostle." These are often prepared in dishes that the state shares with most of the rest of Mexico such as tacos, tamales, moles and a specialty of central Mexico, mixiote. Another common central Mexican dish popular in the state is barbacoa. This dish has its origins in the pre-Hispanic period, when it was meat cooked in an underground pit. Today, it is most often cooked in pots in more conventional ovens, but the meat, today mostly pork, is still smothered in the alcoholic beverage pulque and wrapped in maguey leaves for flavor. This preparation of barbacoa is considered to be the state dish.

== Tourism ==
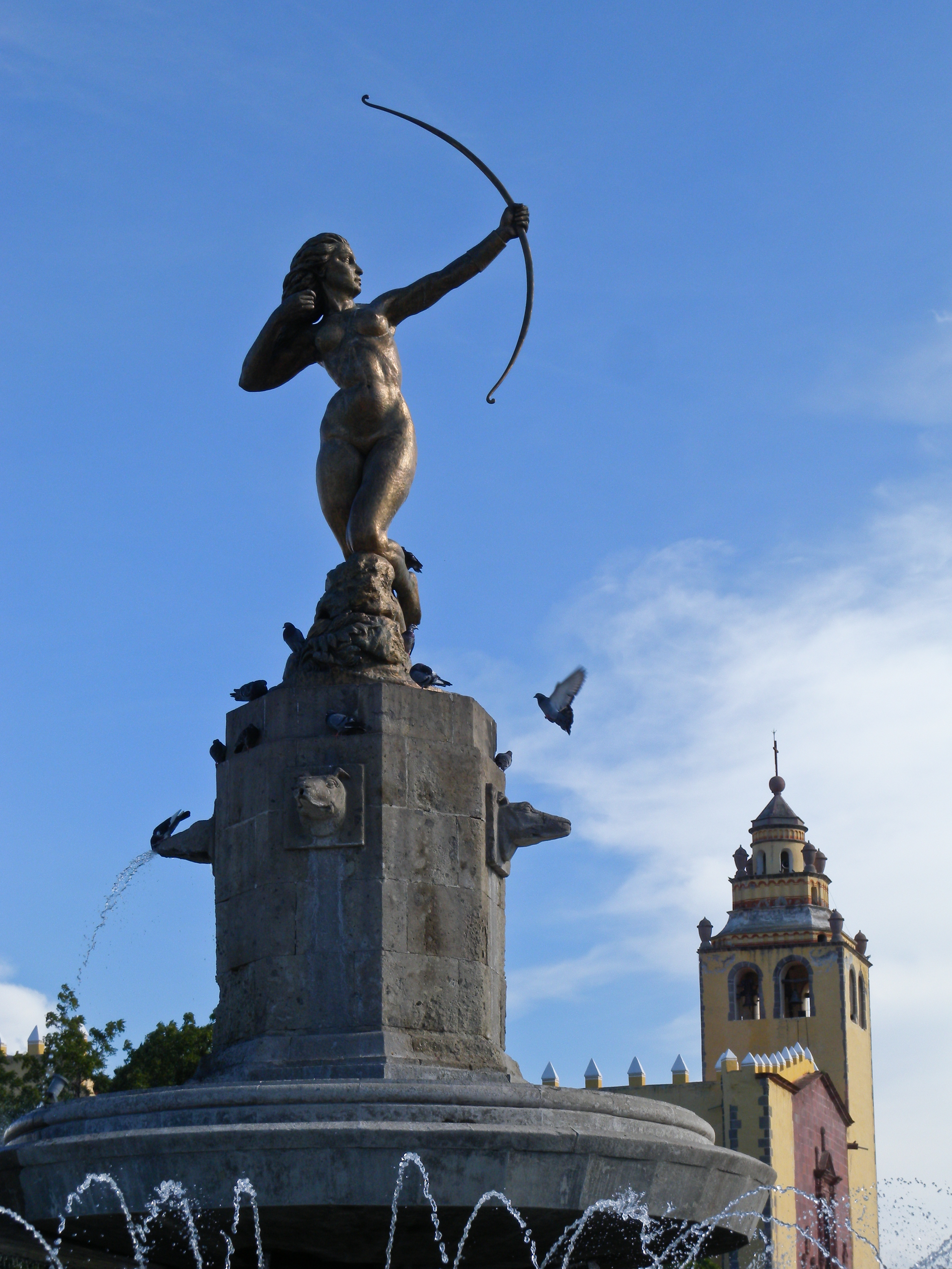
The original statue of Diana Cazadora is located in Ixmiquilpan.

The state secretary of tourism has divided the state's attraction into "corridors" with similar themes. The Corridor de la Montaña (Mountain Corridor) is devoted to ecotourism and includes a number of different climates and ecosystems. These areas favor activities such as camping, extreme sports and well as family activities. They include places such as old mining haciendas, archeological sites and state parks. Municipalities which are promoted under this category include Mineral del Monte, Huasca de Ocampo and Mineral del Chico. The Corridor de los Balnearios (Water Park Corridor) list most of the major water parks, spas, natural pools and thermal springs in the state. Hidalgo ranks second in Mexico for the number of thermal springs. These springs have an average temperature of 38C but some reach as high as 80C. They exist due to rivers of magma that flow under the surface. Municipalities promoted under this category include Ixmiquilpan, Actopan and Cardonal.

The Corridor Tulancingo y los 4 elementos (Tulancingo and the 4 elements Corridor) is named for its major location of Tulancingo and the sports that are promoted here. Sporting activities are classed under the elements of air, water, fire and earth and include hot air ballooning, fishing, boating, rustic ironwork produced in Apulco and hiking in the natural landscapes. The area extends from the municipality of Tulancingo to the municipality of Huehuetla. (4 elementos)

The Corridor de las Haciendas (Haciendas Corridor) contains most of the state's 176 former haciendas which were constructed between the 16th and the 19th centuries. Most were devoted to mining or the making of pulque. Many contain the original buildings, including the main residences as well as tours. Many of these are in rural municipalities, which conserve old traditions. In the Apan area, most of the old haciendas were devoted to the making of pulque, which is still made and can be sampled. The area also contains many of the state's former colonial monasteries as well as civic constructions such as the Padre Tembleque Aqueduct.

The Sierra and Huasteca Corridor covers this mountain range which is home to the Huastec people. The area includes ecotourism activities, camping and fishing in an area filled with dense vegetations and heated water sources. Municipalities featured here include Huejutla de Reyes, Zacualtipán and Molango where many indigenous people live. The cuisine of the area is also emphasized.

The Tolteca Corridor centers on the archeological site of Tula, which was the home of one of the principal pre-Hispanic civilizations of Mexico. Many of the oldest monasteries of the state, founded in the 16th century, are located here. Hacienda Demiñho, which was once one of the most important and largest haciendas in the state, is located in this area. Featured municipalities include Tula de Allende, Atotonilco de Tula, Tepeji del Rio, Mixquiahuala, Tlahuelilpan, Tlaxcoapan and Tezontepec.

Tourism in Hidalgo

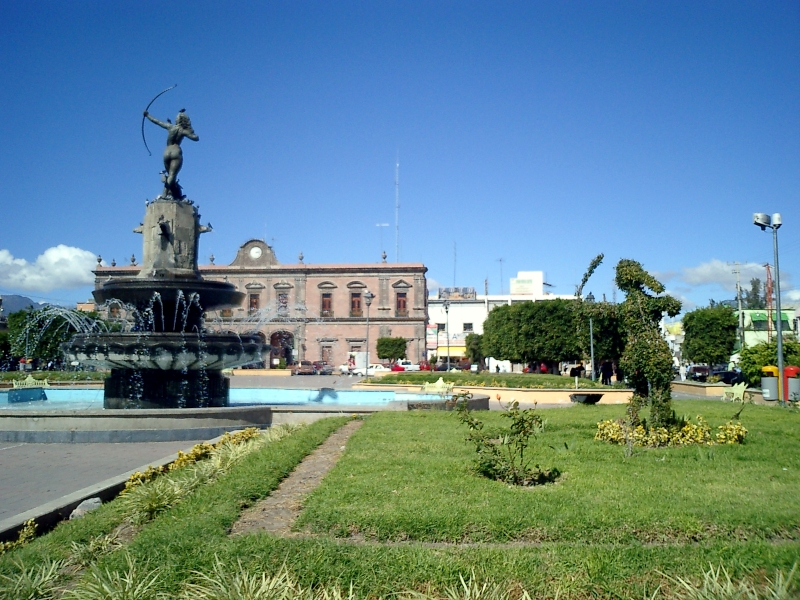
Ixmiquilpan

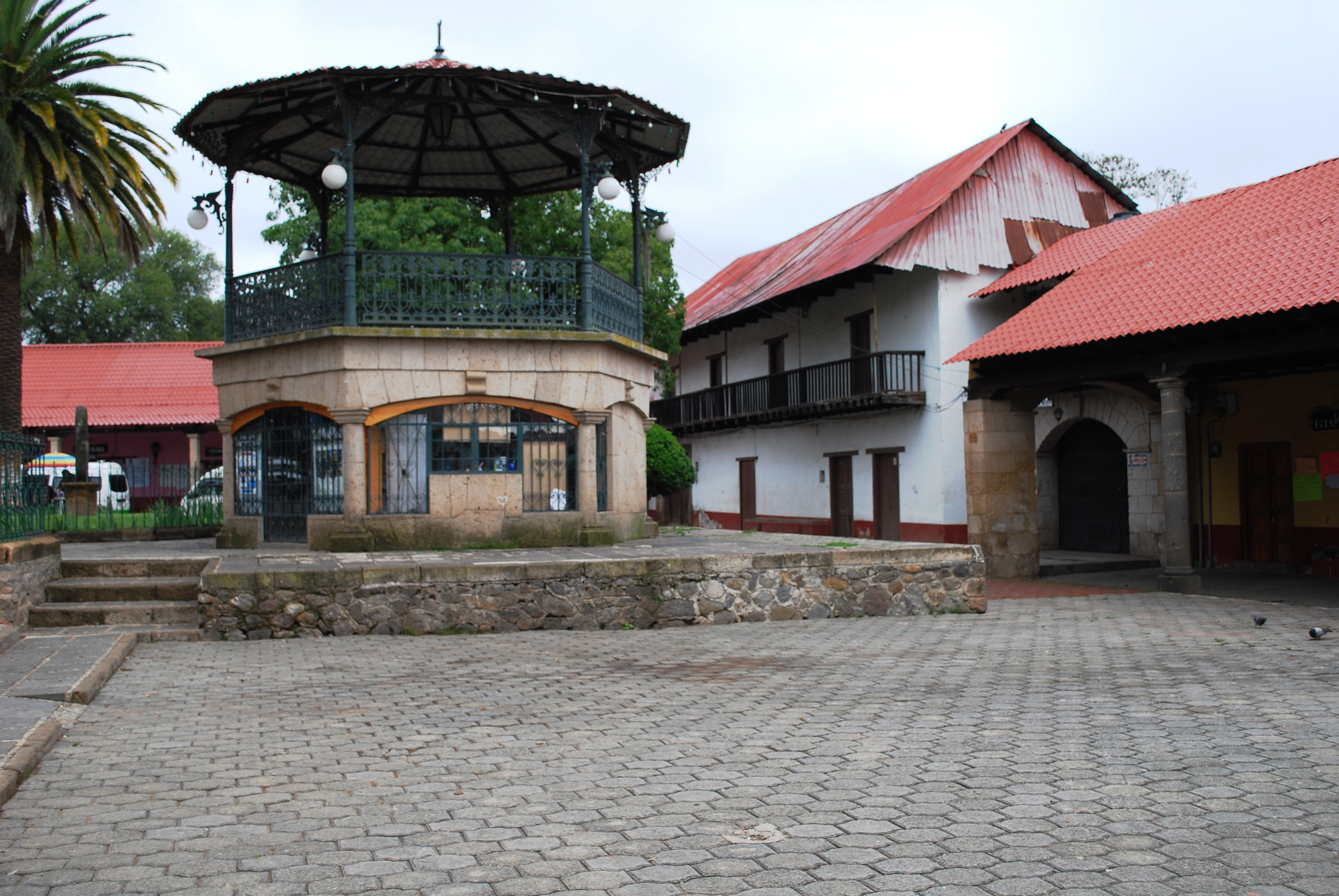
Huasca de Ocampo

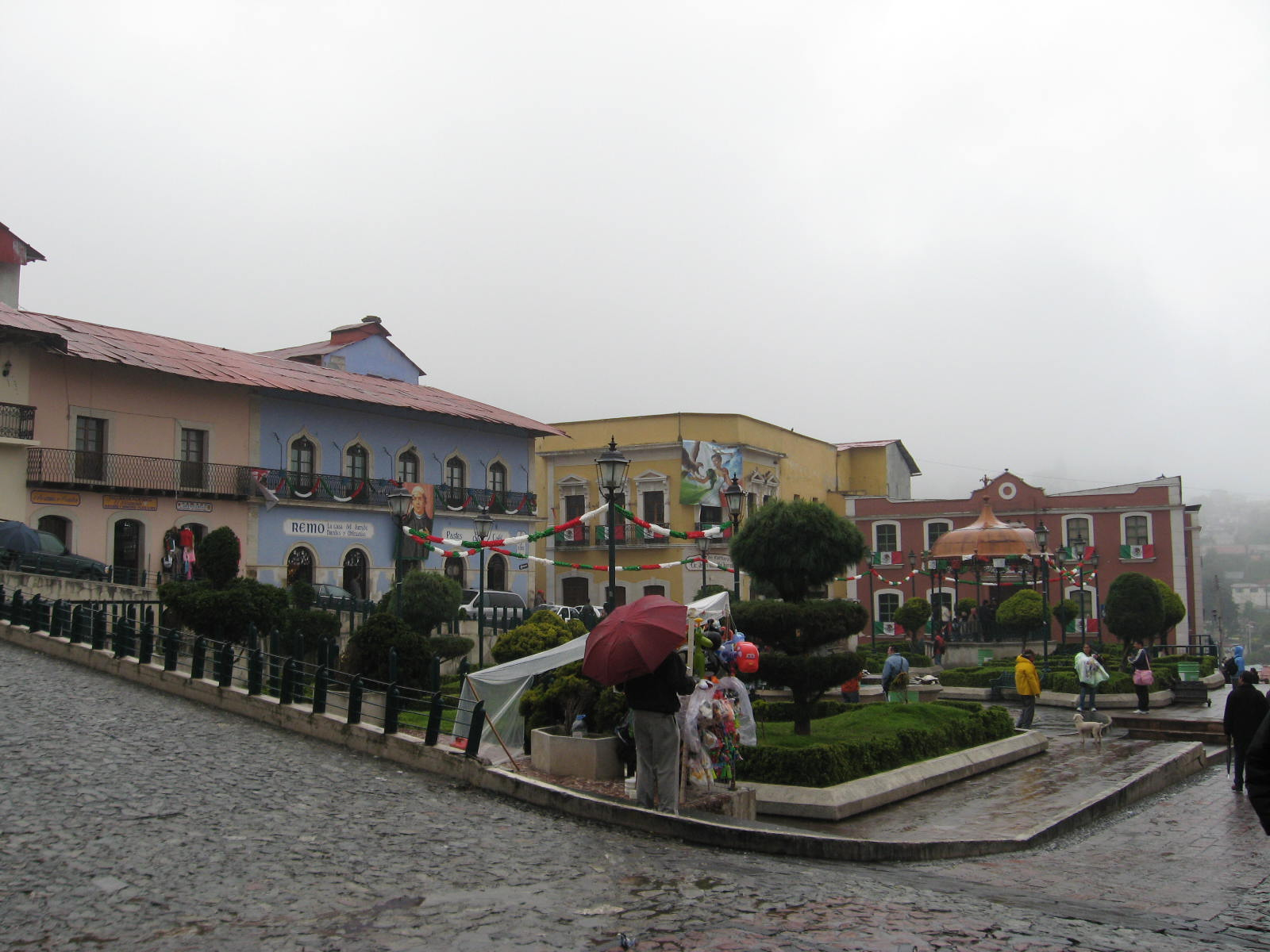
Real del Monte

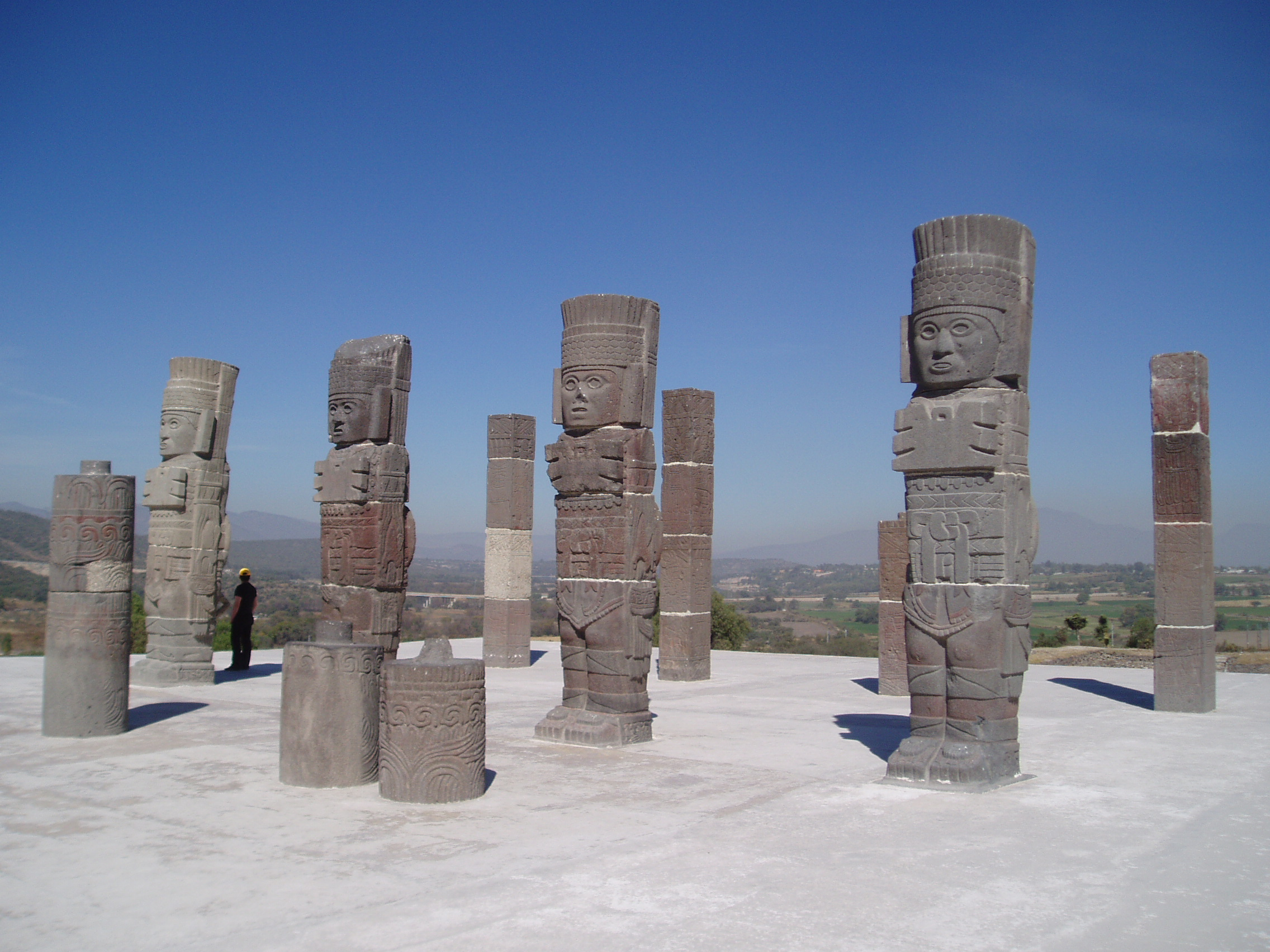
Tula

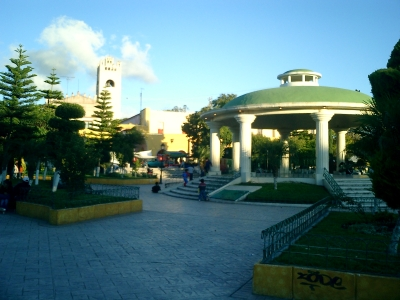
Actopan

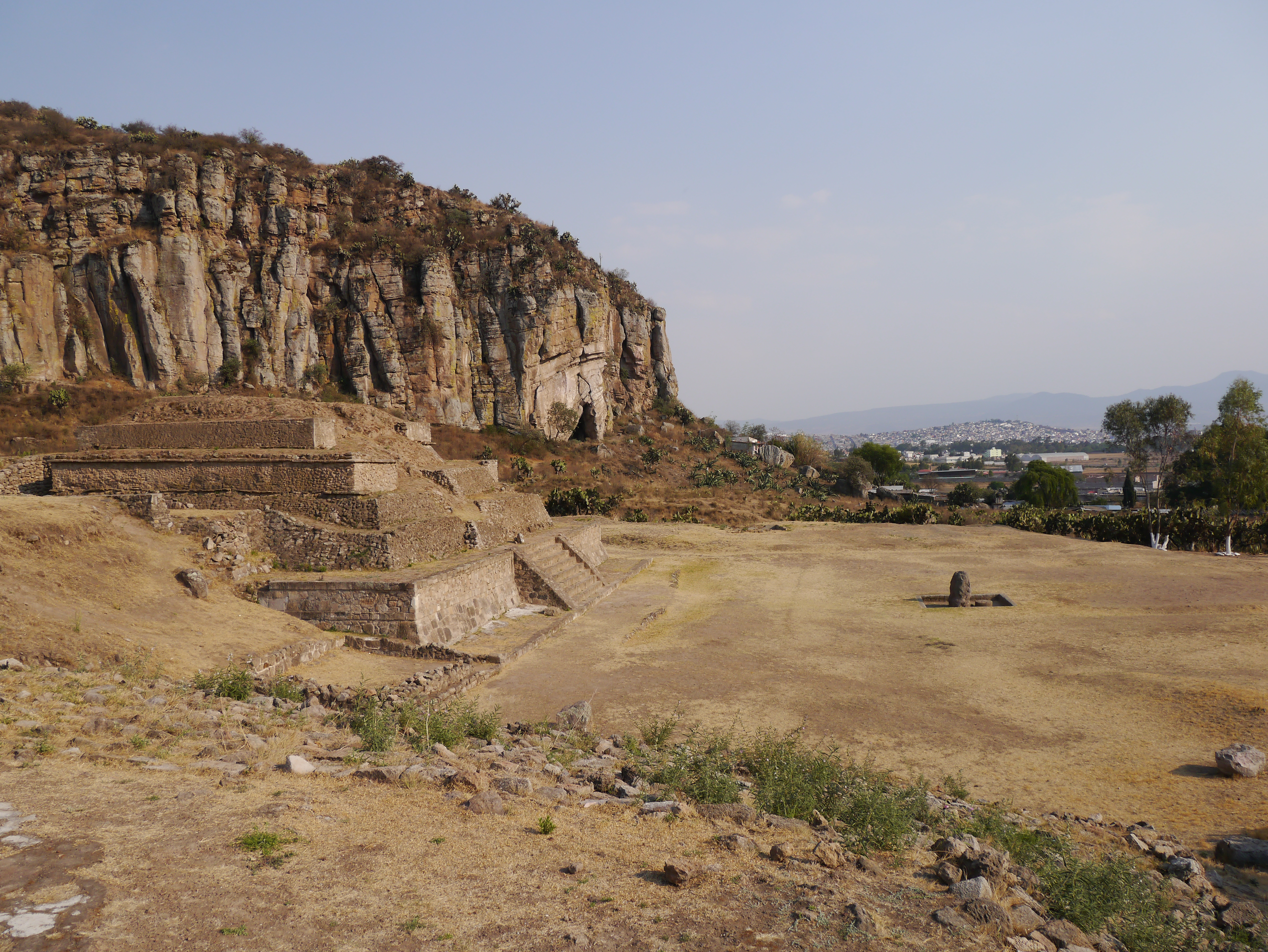
Huapalcalco

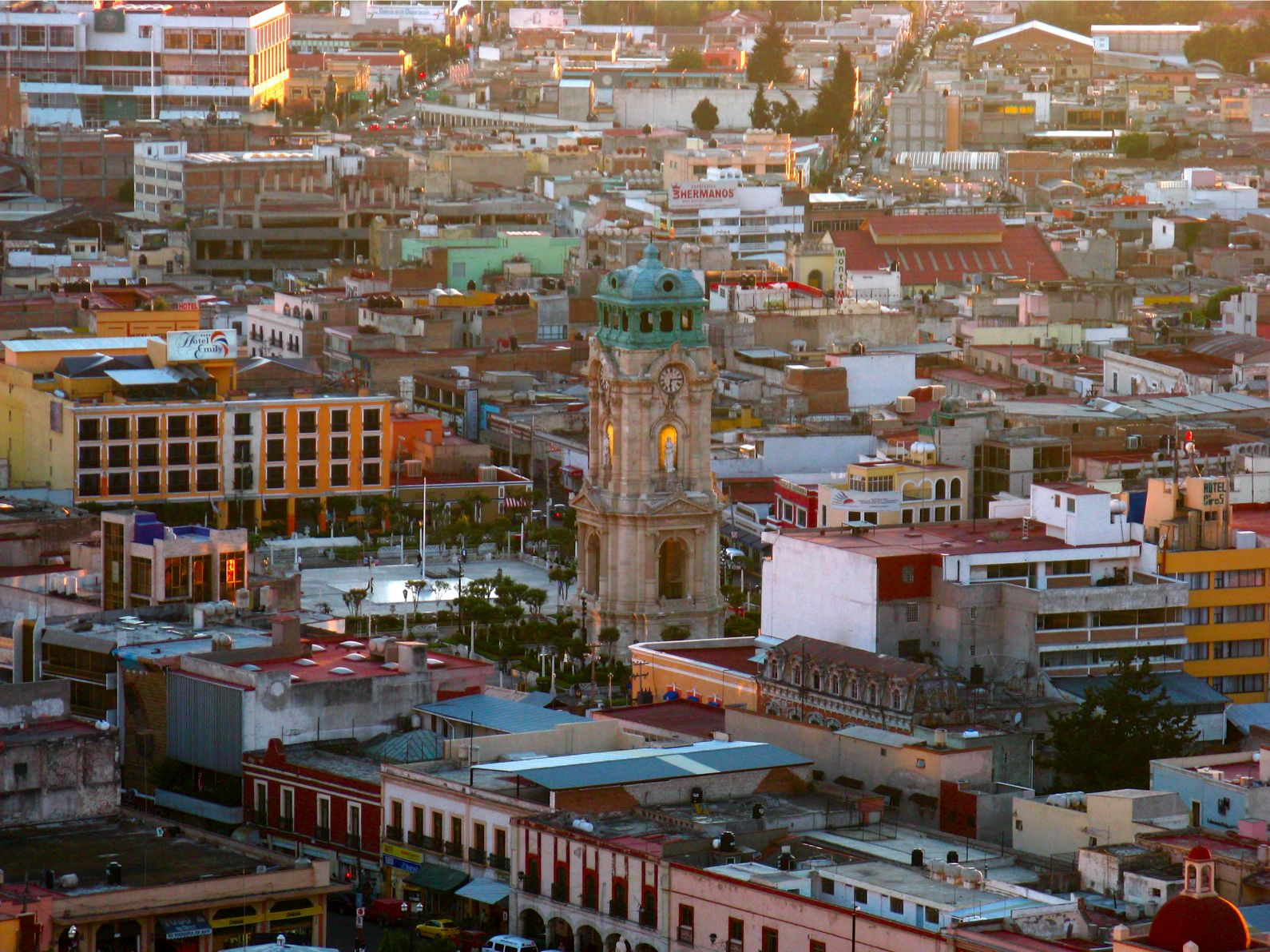
Pachuca de Soto

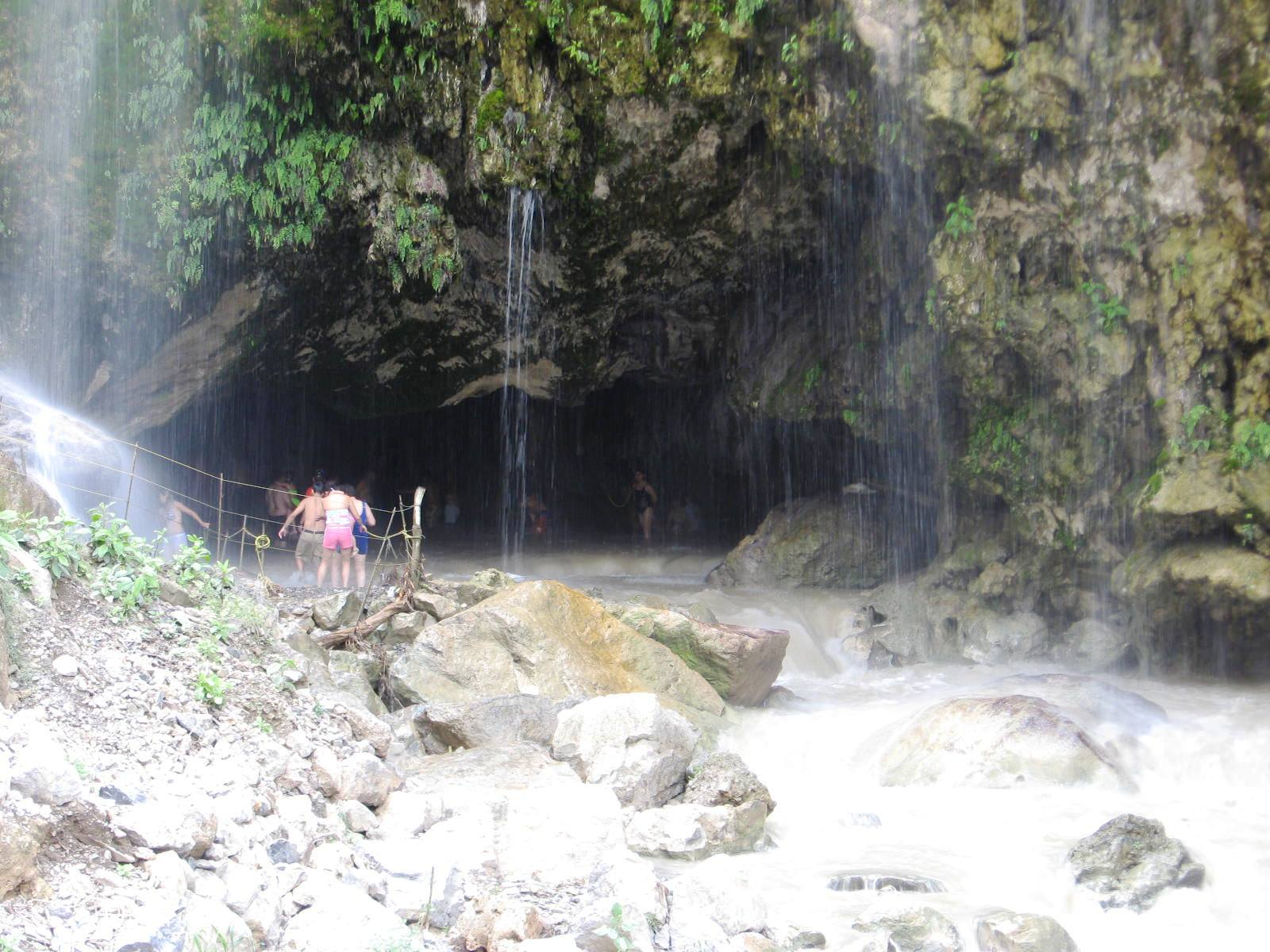
Tolantongo Caves

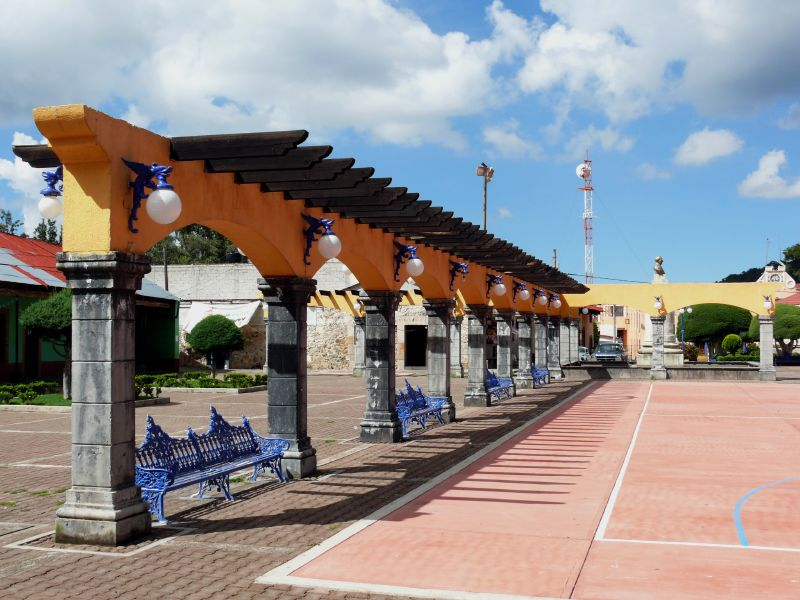
Omitlán de Juárez

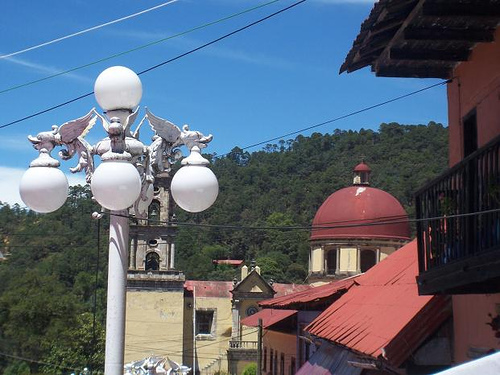
Mineral del Chico

== Geography ==
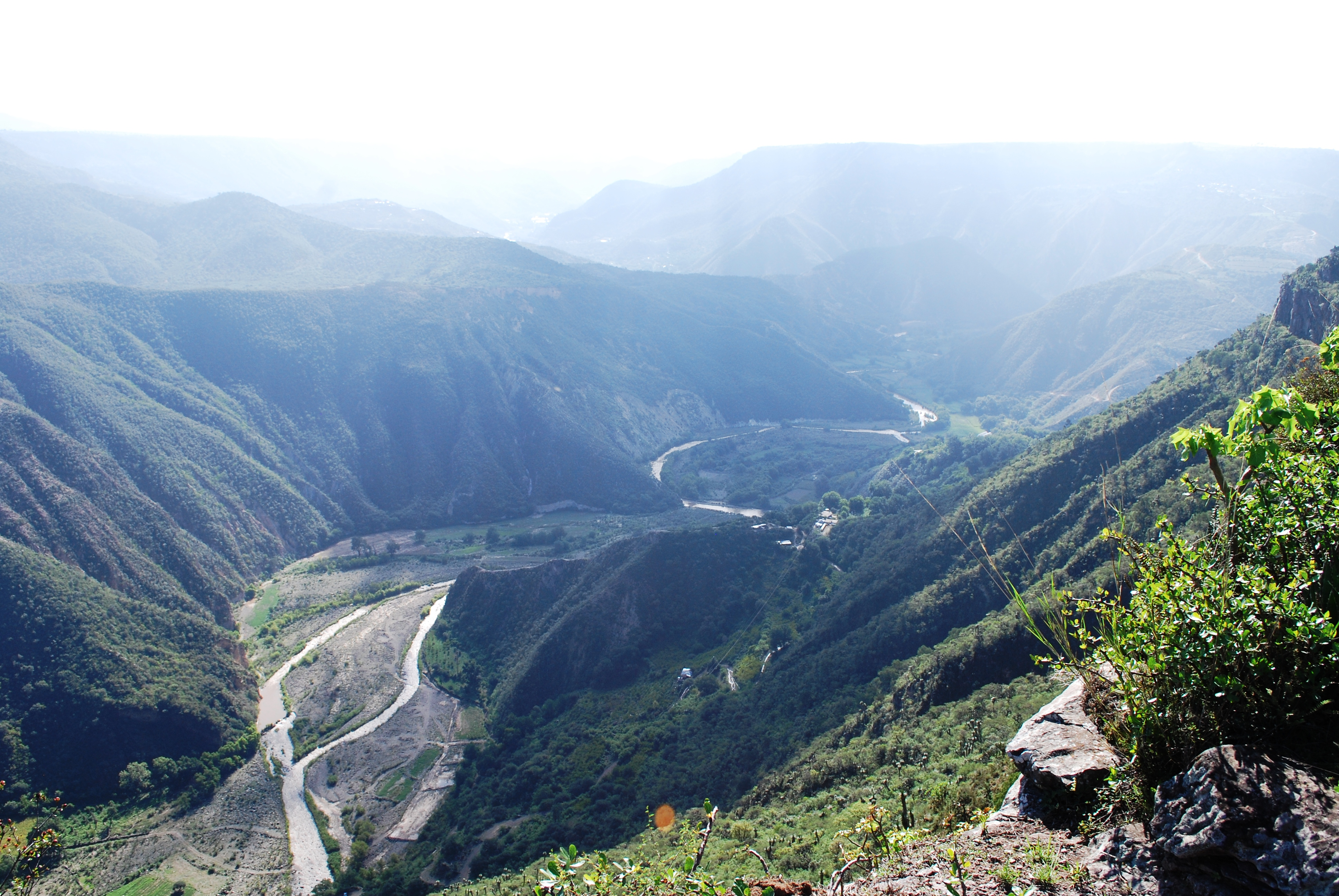
Canyon south of Peña del Aire, in Huasca de Ocampo, a part of the Barranca de Metztitlán Biosphere Reserve.

The terrain of the state is very rugged. At its lowest point it is only a few meters above sea level, and at its highest it is over 3,300 meters above sea level.

The state is divided into three geographical regions: the Atlantic Coastal Plain, the Sierra Madre Oriental (mountain ranges), and the Trans-Mexican Volcanic Belt, which contains the highest peaks. Each of these regions is distinct from the rest.

=== Mountains ===
The Sierra Alta region is part of the Sierra Madre Oriental mountain system, and in the temperate climate zone of the state. Some of Hidalgo's main peaks are located here, including Cerro del Aguila, Cerro del Santo Roa, and Cerrro de Agua Fria. There is also Cerro la Aguja de Calnali, a volcanic cinder cone. Many of Hidalgo's caves are located here, such as Texcatete in Zacualtipan; Texcapa in Tepehuacán; and Tecamachal and Villacastla in Molango.

The Sierra Baja is also located in the Sierra Madre Oriental system and is characterized by small plains surrounded by stony peaks. There are five major canyons located here, which take their names from the rivers that form them, from south to north: Amajac, Meztitlan, Amolon, Mezquititlán and Tolantongo. Although lower than the temperate Sierra Alta, the Sierra Baja still has a temperate climate due to strong, moist winds which flow from the northeast.

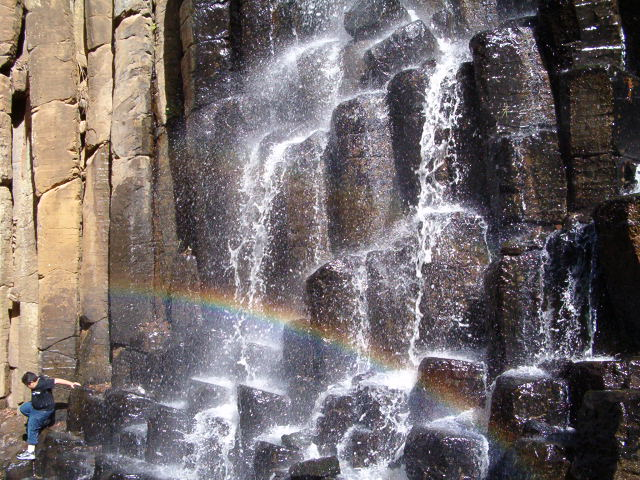
Basaltic Prisms of Santa María Regla

The Sierra Gorda mountain range is a branch of the Sierra Madre Oriental which crosses northwest Hidalgo and ends in San Luis Potosí. These are mostly mountains of volcanic origin. The Tula and Moctezuma Rivers meet here, whose waters then cut the Moctezuma Canyon, which has walls up to 480 meters high.

The Sierra de Tenango or Sierra Norte de Puebla mountain range begins to one side of the Valley of Tulancingo and extends down to the Huasteca region of the states of Puebla and Veracruz. The range is also known as the Sierra de Huayacocotla, with low lying mountains of a humid, cloudy temperate climate with frequent rain in the summer. Two of Hidalgo's main dams, the Tejocotal and the Omitemetl, are located on the rivers here, and are part of the Necaxa Hydroelectrical System.

La Comarca Minera is the mining district in the mountains around Pachuca and Real del Monte. Cerro de las Navajas is located here, a mountain made primarily of obsidian. The mining district and mountains extend from Pachuca north towards the municipality of Huasca, then east towards Actopan. From Pachuca it also extends a short ways south to Mineral de la Reforma and Comarca. In most of this region there is extensive mining, both of precious metals as well as lead and building stone, such as sandstone and marble. Over 38 million kilograms of silver and 200 tons of fine gold have been extracted since the Spanish colonial era began in the 16th century. That nearly equals the weight of the stone used to build the Tembleque Aqueduct. In additions to mines, the area is home to extensive forests of oyamel fir, pines. and oaks. Many of its peaks are rocky and barren such as Zumate in Omitlán, Peñas Cargadas in Real del Monte and Peña del Conejo in San Jerónimo.

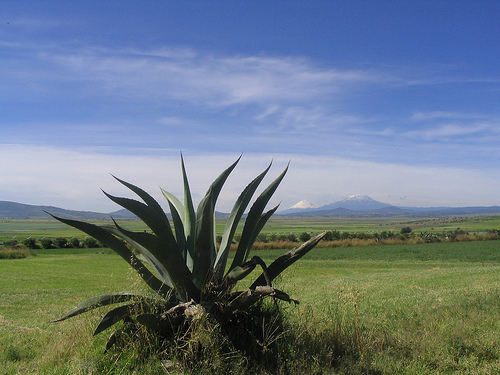
Trans-Mexican Volcanic Belt in the Municipality of Apan, southern Hidalgo.

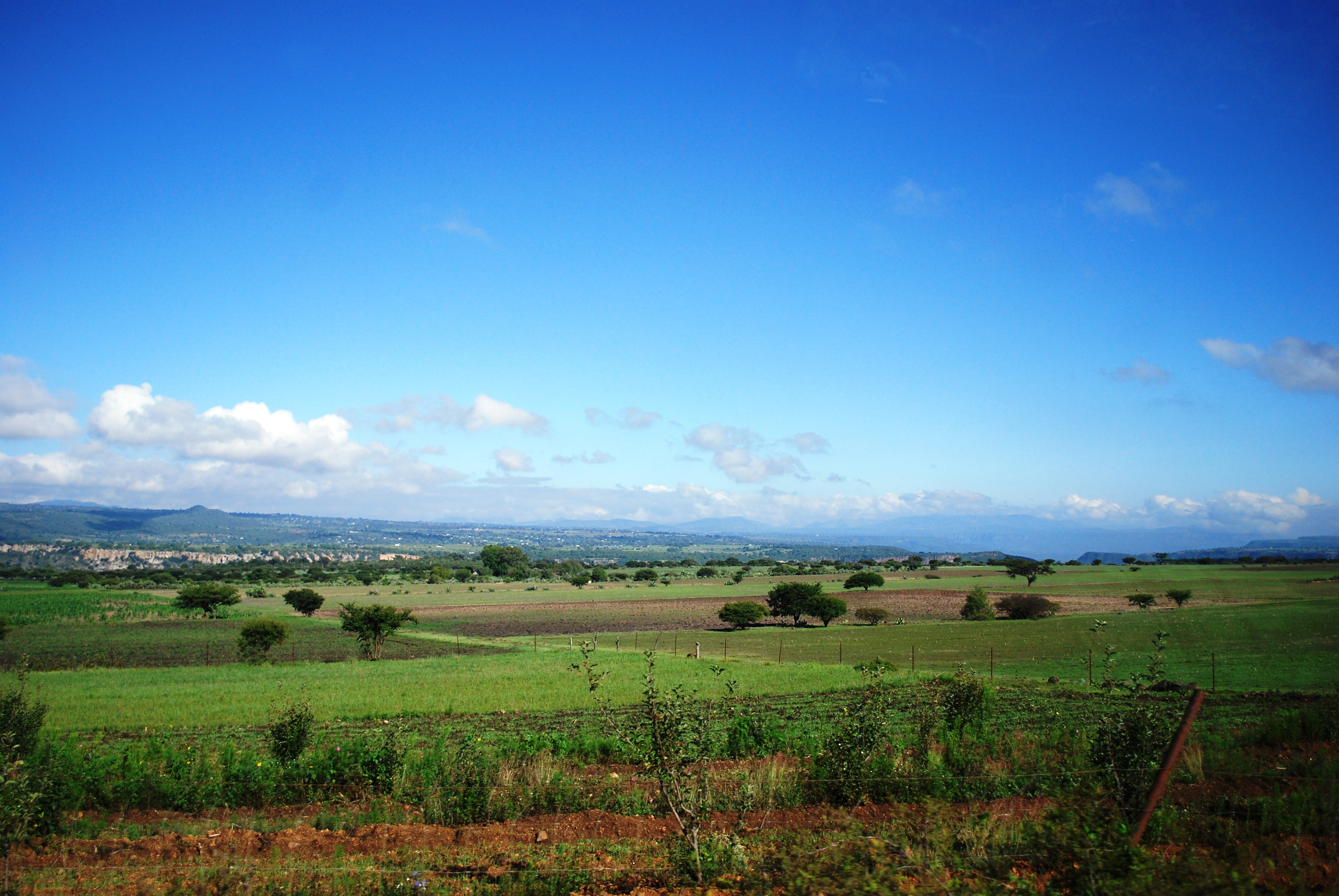
Tulancingo Valley, temperate zone.

=== Valleys ===
The Valley of Tulancingo has a temperate climate with an average year round temperature of 15C. It is bordered by the Sierra de Tenango and the highlands of Apan. It is a large fertile valley with extensive agriculture.

The very northern part of the Valley of Mexico is located within the state, which is separated from the area in which Mexico City is found by a series of low lying mountains. This part of the Valley extends from Tizayuca towards Pachuca. It is separated from the Valley of Mezquital by the Sierra de Tezontlalpan and from the rest of the Valley of Mexico by the low lying Sierra de los Pitos. The climate here is temperate and semi arid with occasional freezes. Except for the forests on the mountain tops, the flora and fauna are those found in more arid regions such as maguey, yucca, rabbits, armadillos and mesquite trees.

Since many of the mountains surrounding Pachuca lack tree cover, little slows the prevailing winds which can reach speeds of up to 120 km per hour. This gives the capital city the nickname of La Bella Airosa (Beautiful Windy City).

The Valley of Mezquital is three valleys called the Actopan, the Ixmiquilpan and the Tasquillo as well as flat areas known as Tula and Alfajayucan. The vegetation is mostly that of semi arid regions with mesquite trees and various types of cacti growing. The only areas with tree cover are those near streams and other water sources and on the mountain tops of the peaks. Despite this, the region is considered to be Hidalgo's granary, growing corn, beans, wheat, tomatoes, onions, oats, olives, cactus fruit, tejocote and much more. It produces more than half of the alfalfa and green chili peppers in Mexico. Due to the lack of rainfall, irrigation from the areas above and below ground streams is important. However, it is also one of the areas of Mexico with the highest levels of malnutrition. The valley averages 2000 meters above sea level and has a temperate climate with freezes being rare.

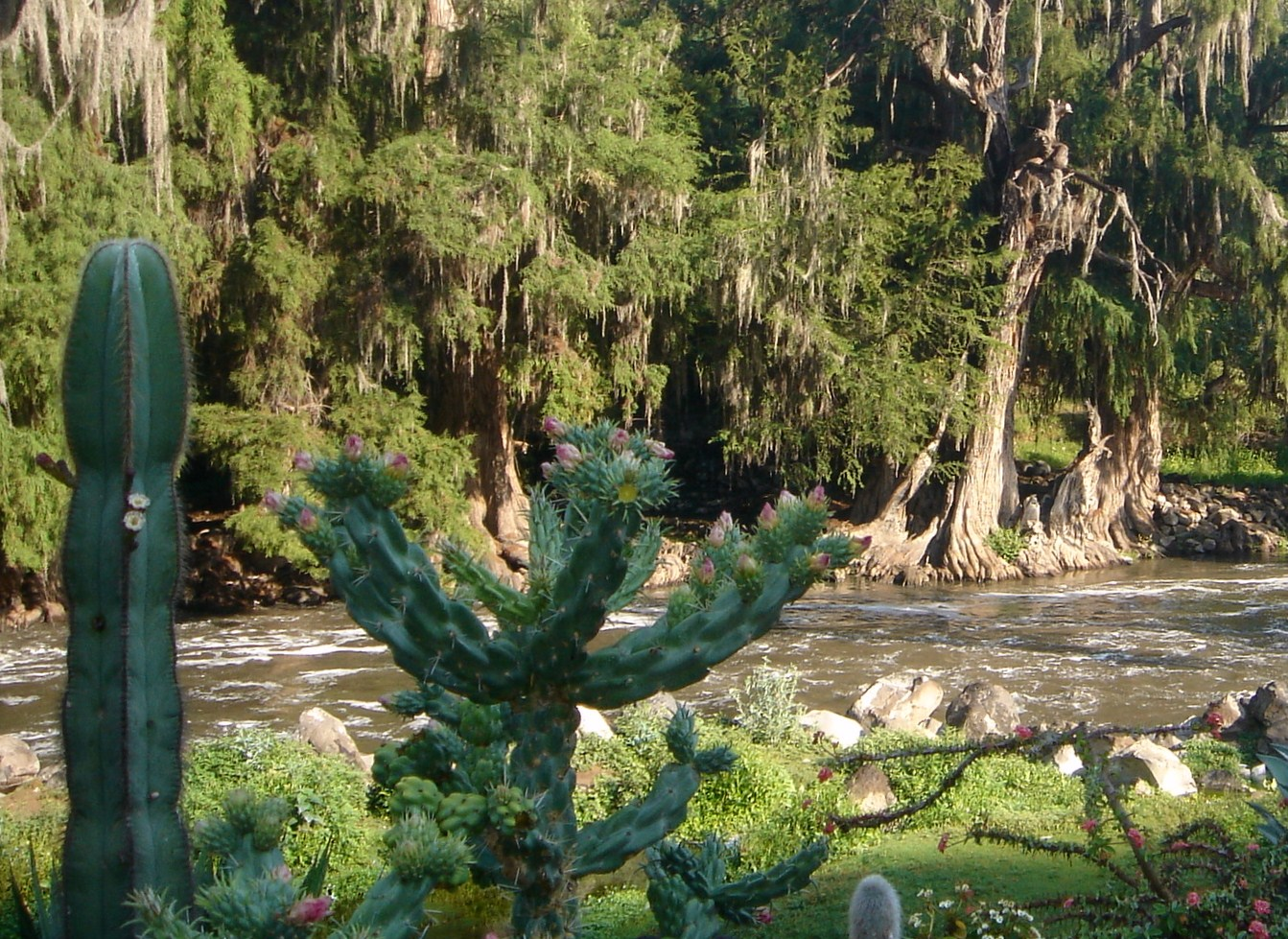
Tula River, in the municipality of Mixquiahuala.

=== Water ===
Principal rivers include the Tula, Amajac and the Metztitlan. Other rivers in the state flow into these three, such as the Rosas, Cuautitlan, Guadalupe and Salado, which flow into the Tula River. One exception to this is the San Juan River, which forms part of the state's border with Querétaro. This river flows into the Pánuco River in San Luis Potosí. The Amajac begins in the Sierra de Pachuca and flows southeast. The Metztitlan River begins at the state's border with Puebla state and eventually flows into Metztitlan Lake. Principal lakes in the state are the Metztitlán, Zupitlan or Tulancingo, San Antonio, Pueblilla and Carrillos. The state also has a significant number of sulfur and hot water springs such as La Cantera in Tula, Mixquiahual and Vito in Atotonilco, Tephé in Ejido Tephé, Humedades y Dios Padra in Ixmiquilpan and Tolantongo and Textacapa in Cardonal.

=== Climate ===
There are three main climates in the state. The lowlands are hot with temperatures rising as high as 44C in the summer in places such as the municipality of Pisaflores. Temperate regions can have hot days but often the temperature is moderated by cooler winds and clouds. Cold climates dominate the highest altitudes where freezing temperatures at night are not uncommon. Rainfall varies widely from as low as 250mm per year to as high as 2,800mm per year. The main indicator of climate type is altitude.

The north of the state has the lowest elevation and the hottest climate. It is also the smallest region of the state. The second region averages about 800 meters above sea level and is more temperate in climate. The coldest climates at the highest areas are the most populated and average about 2,000 meters above sea level. Major elevations in the state include Cerro la Peñuela (3,350 masl), Cerro el Jihuingo (3,240masl), Cerro la Paila (3,200 masl), Cerro las Navajas (3,180 masl), Cerro el Agual Azul (3,040 masl) and Cerro la Estancia (3,020 masl).

In addition to the three main geographic/climate regions, the state subdivides into a number of sub-regions. Sub-regions include the La Huasteca area. This extends like a green sash across part of the state, and altitude does not exceed 800 masl. It is mostly located near the Gulf Coast and receives a significant amount of rainfall from this body of water.

== Ecology ==
Most plants are either of arid and desert habitats, or of the Sierra Madre Oriental pine-oak forests habitat, with Mexican pine (Pinus pseudostrobus) in the higher mountains.

Wildlife includes 31 species of reptiles, thirteen species of duck, six of doves, and three of falcons, as well as mammals such as skunks, spider monkeys, wild boar, anteaters, and gray foxes.

A small habitat in the state is the Huasteca highland rainforest. It has plants blooming nearly year-round. Forests include tree species such as: "Tlacuilo," Oaks (Quercus species), Copaifera, "Zuchiate," Mahogany (Swietenia macrophylla), and Mexican white cedar (Cupressus lusitanica). The area has one of the widest varieties of wild birds including eagles, hummingbirds, and wild turkeys. Reptiles include a wide variety of snakes, and mammals include coyotes, bobcats, wild boar, spotted deer, and rabbits. Tropical crops raised here include sugar cane, coconuts, pineapple, bananas, mamey, and tamarind.

Flora and fauna of Hidalgo

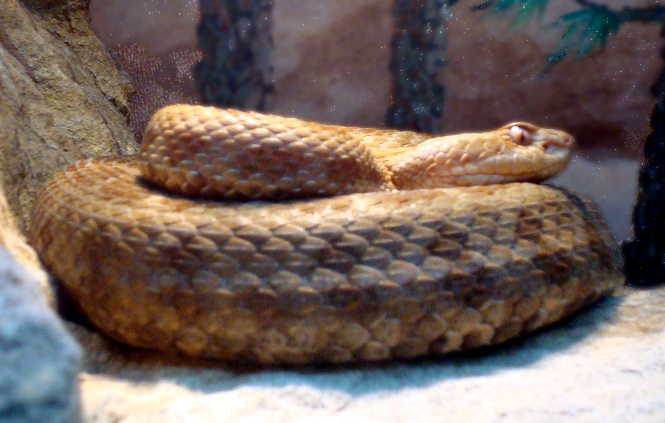
Crotalus aquilus

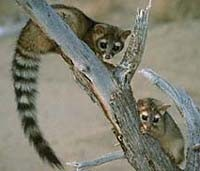
Bassariscus astutus

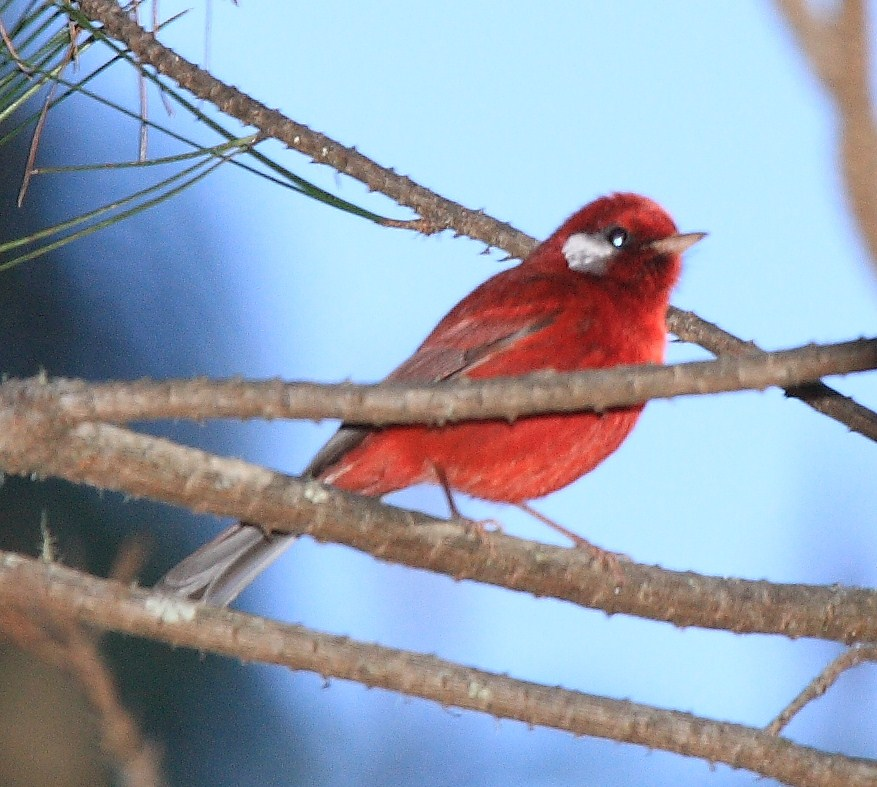
Ergaticus ruber ruber

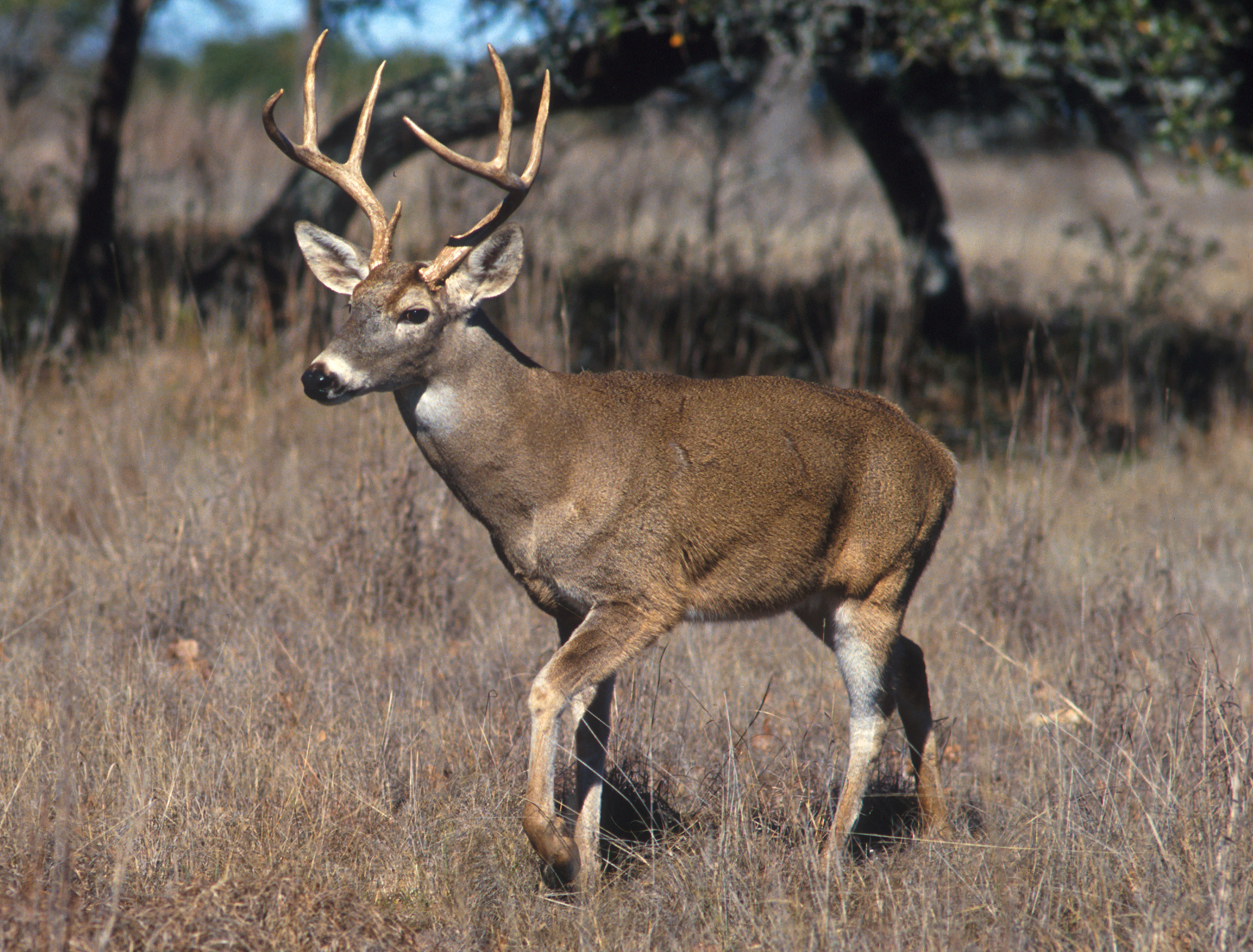
Odocoileus virginianus

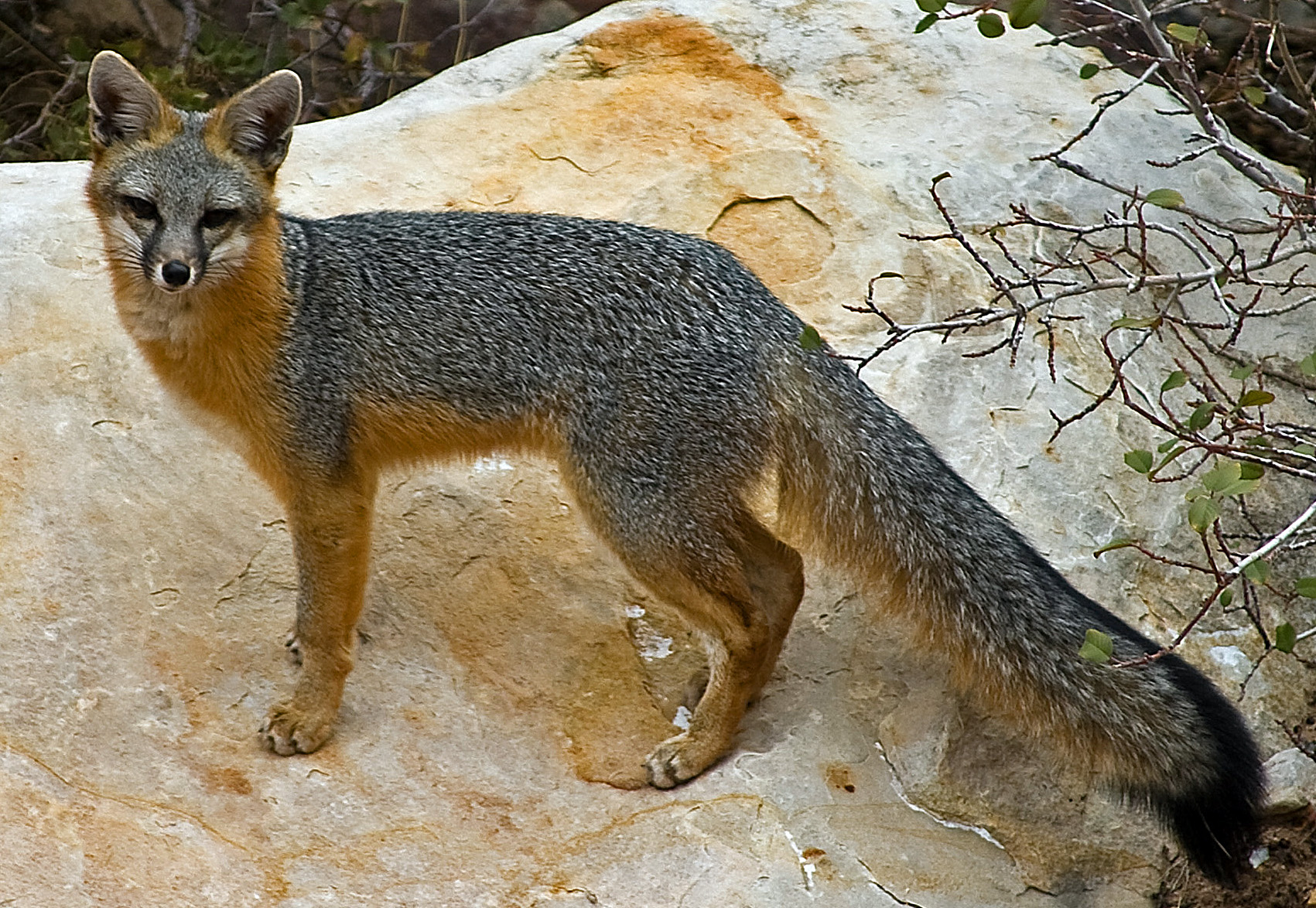
Urocyon cinereoargenteus

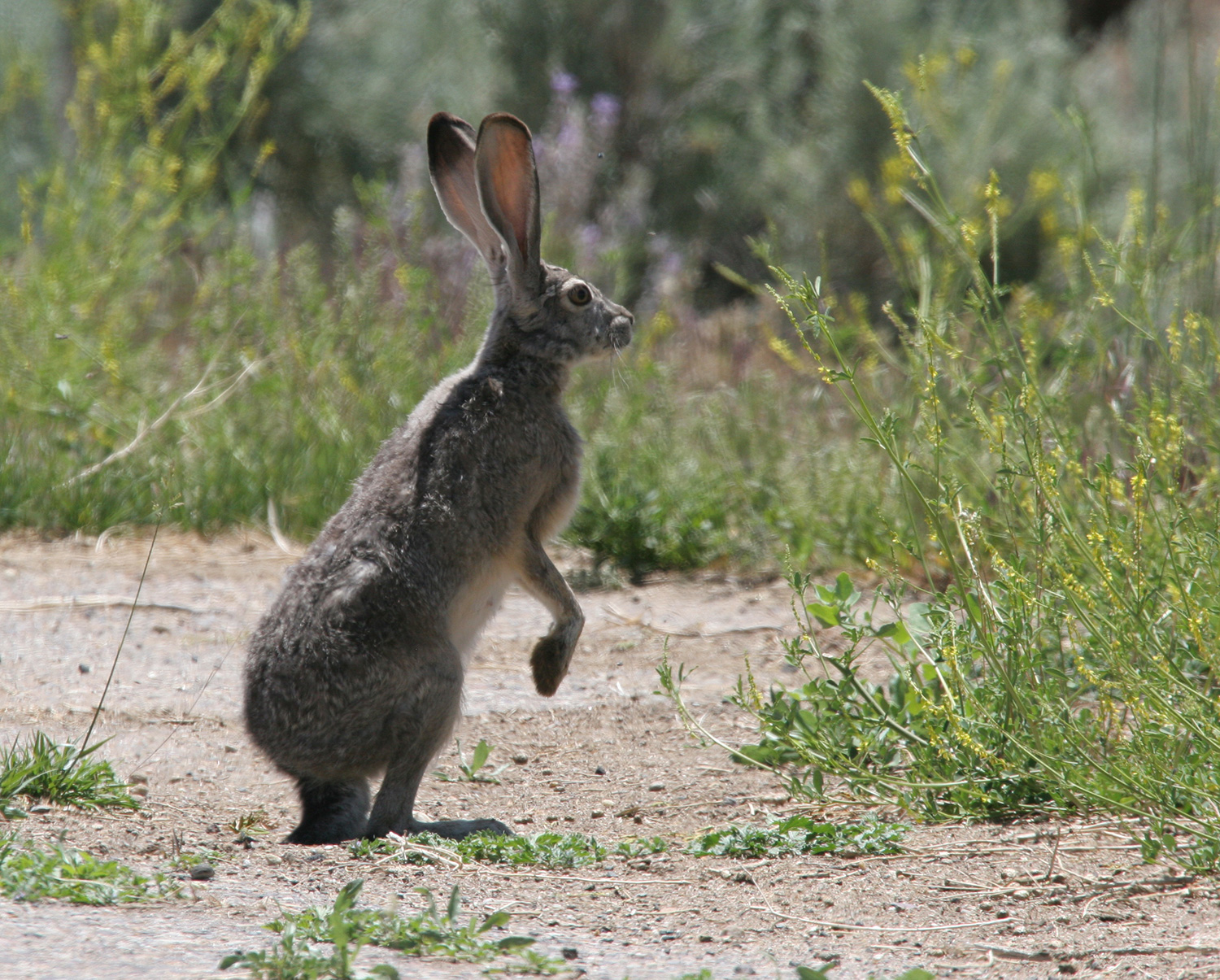
Lepus californicus

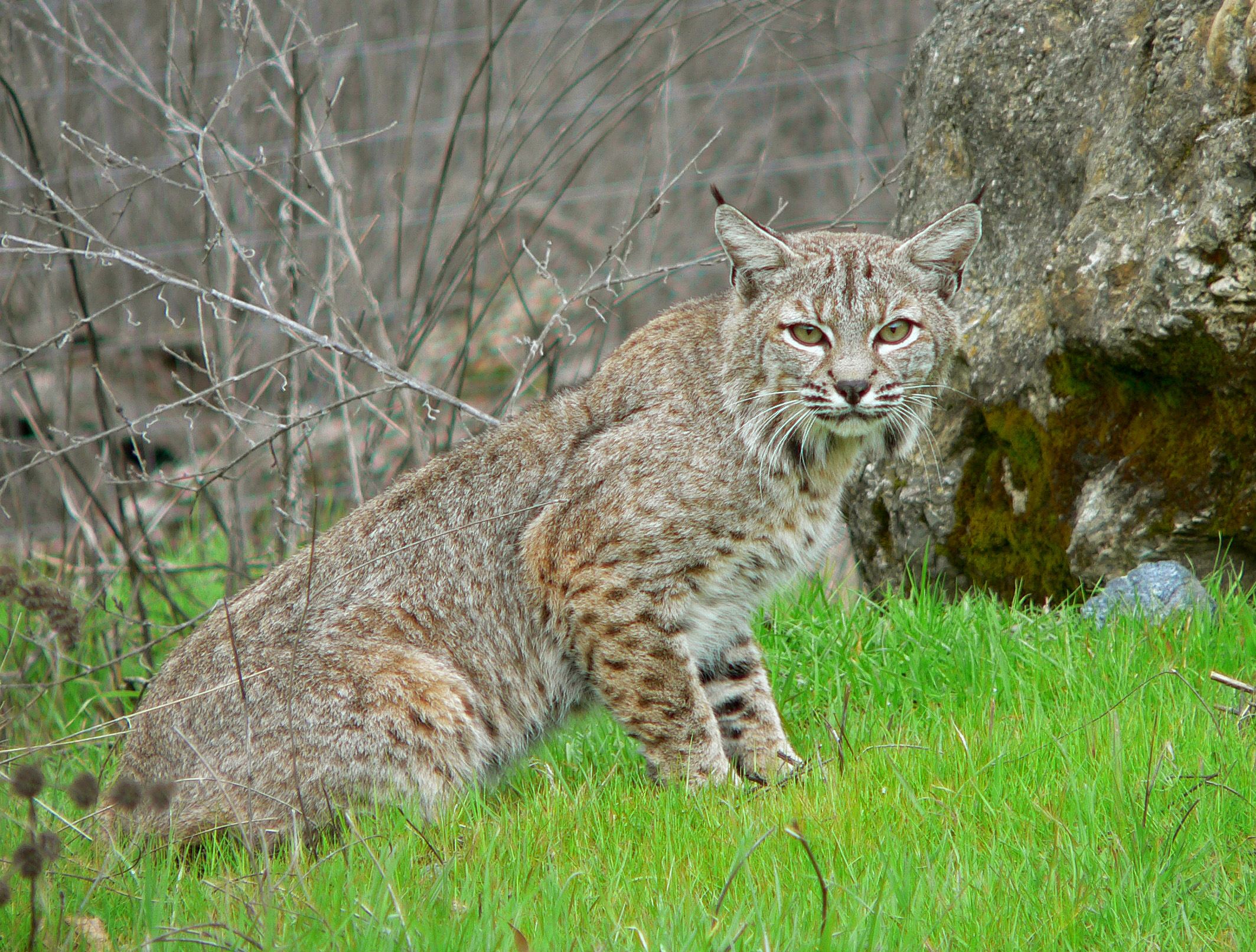
Lynx rufus

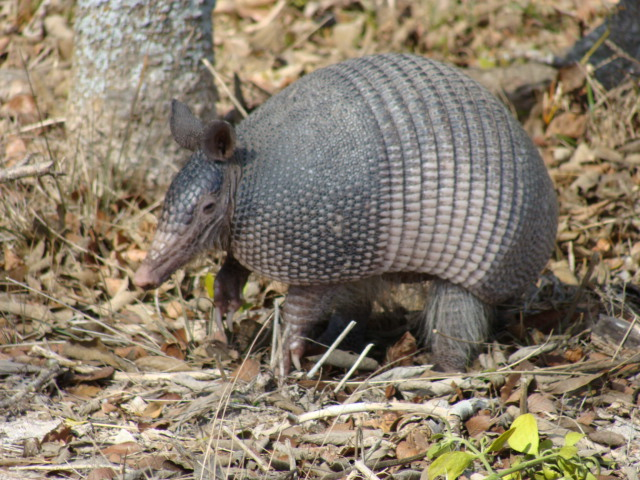
Dasypus novemcinctus

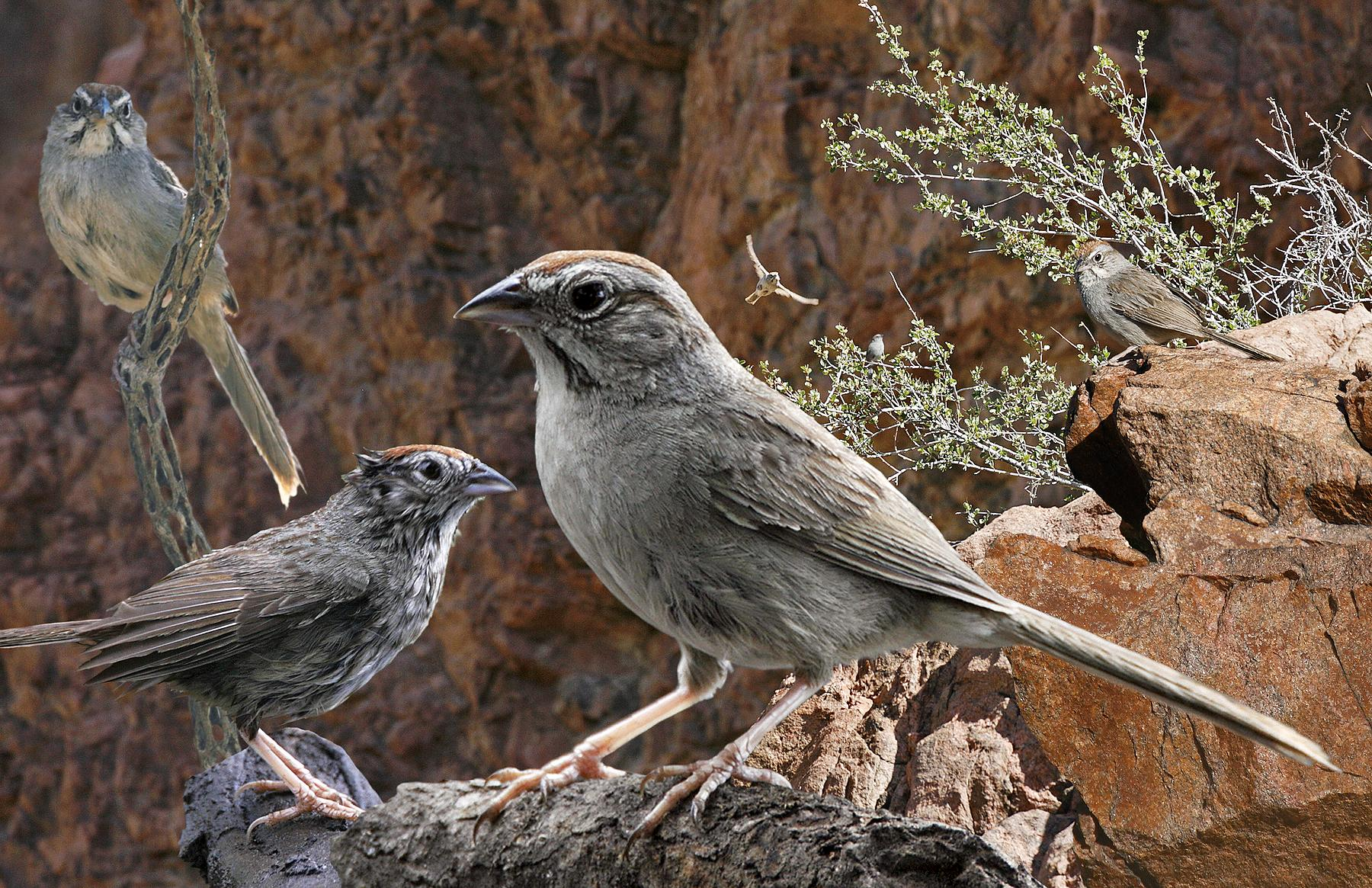
Aimophila ruficeps

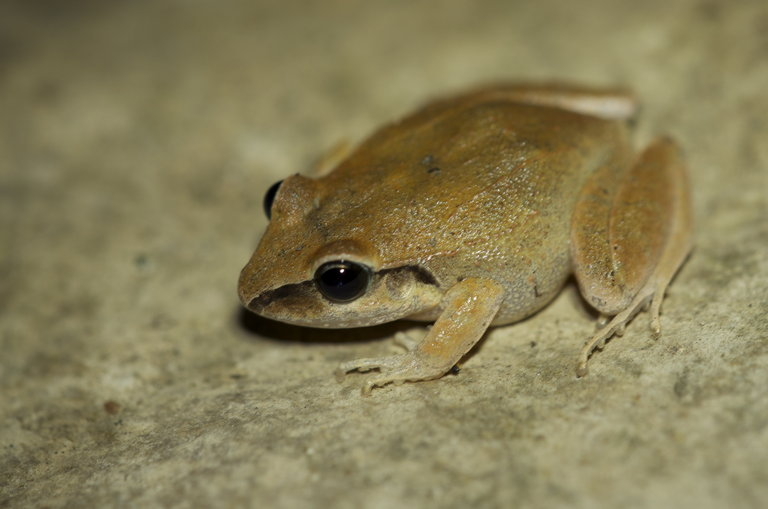
Craugastor rhodopis

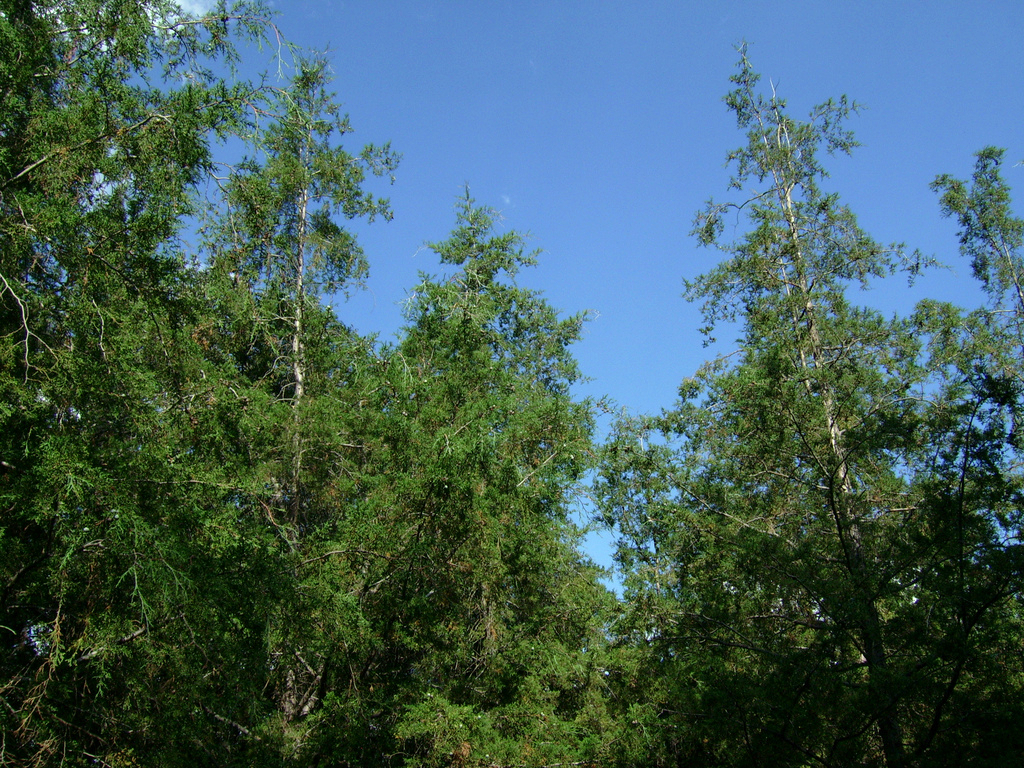
Cupressus lusitanica

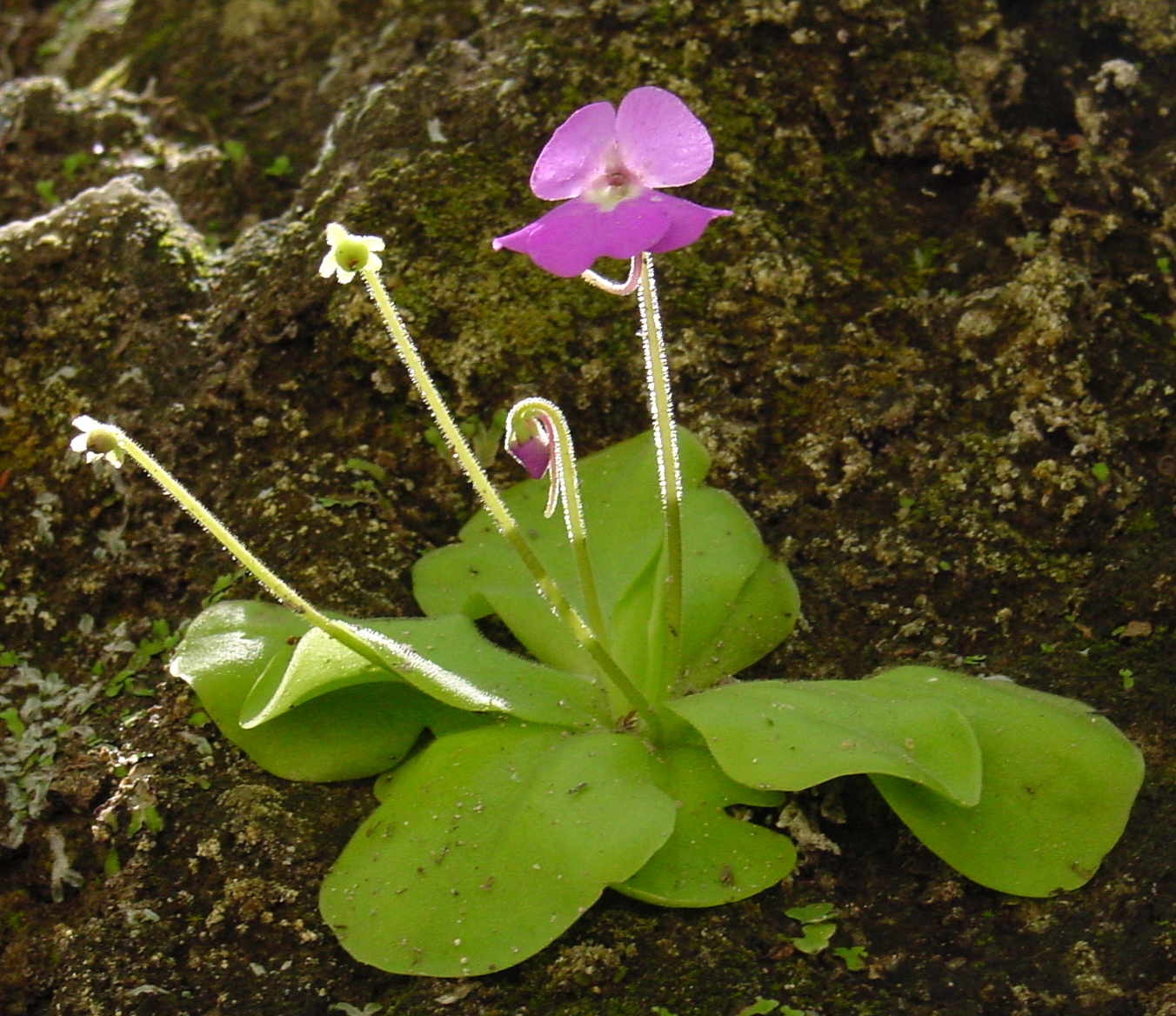
Pinguicula elizabethiae

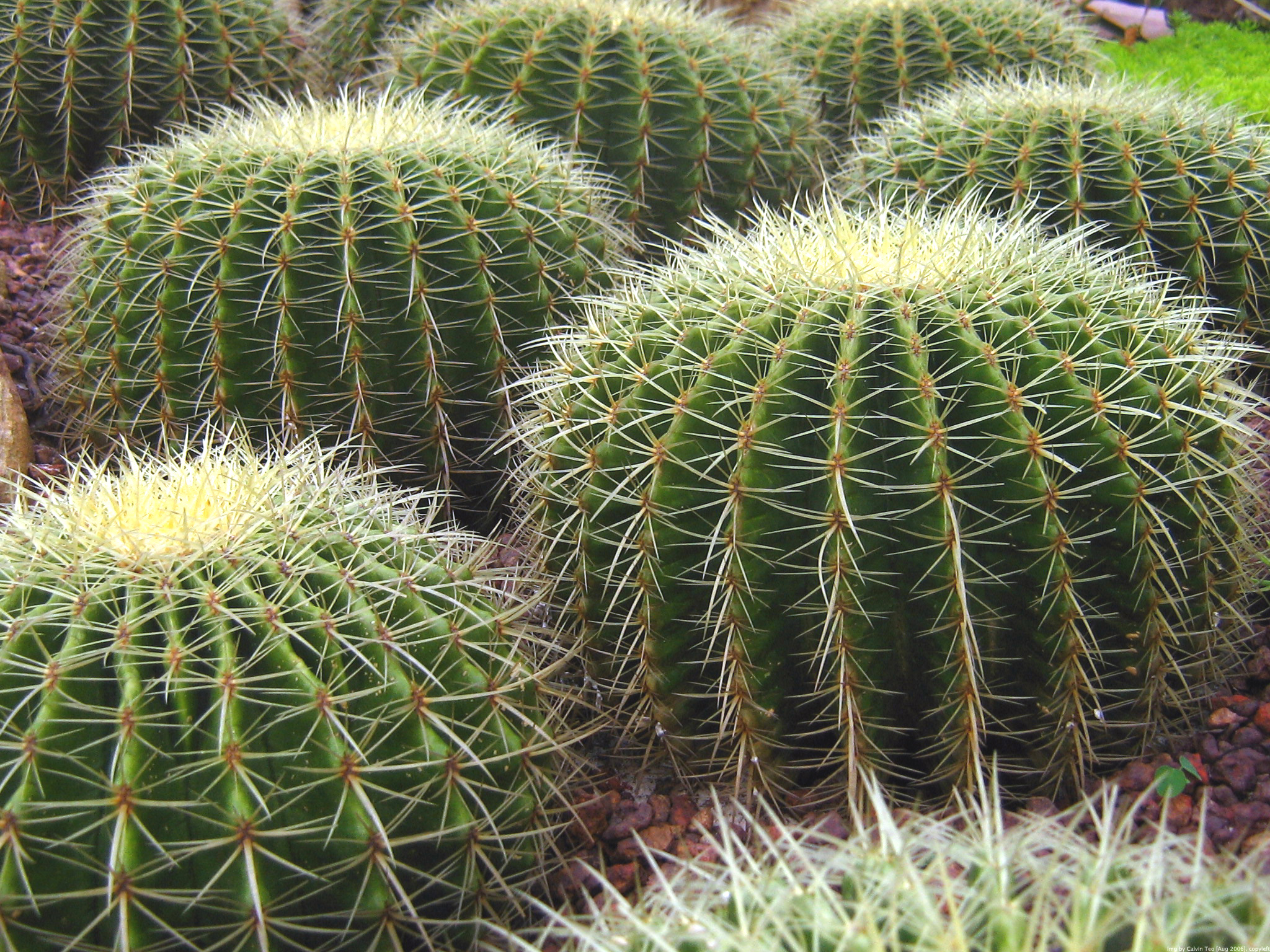
Echinocactus grusonii

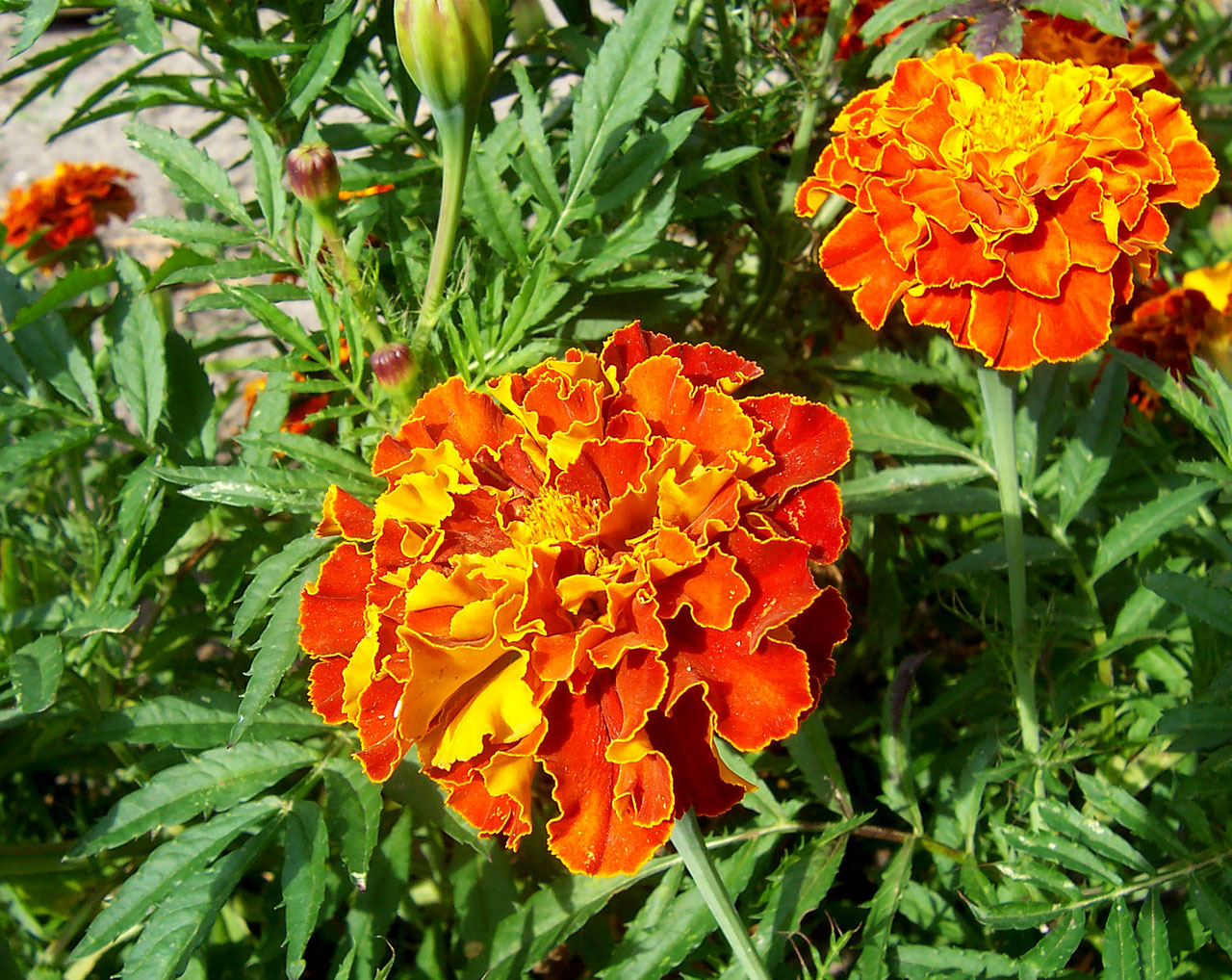
Tagetes patula

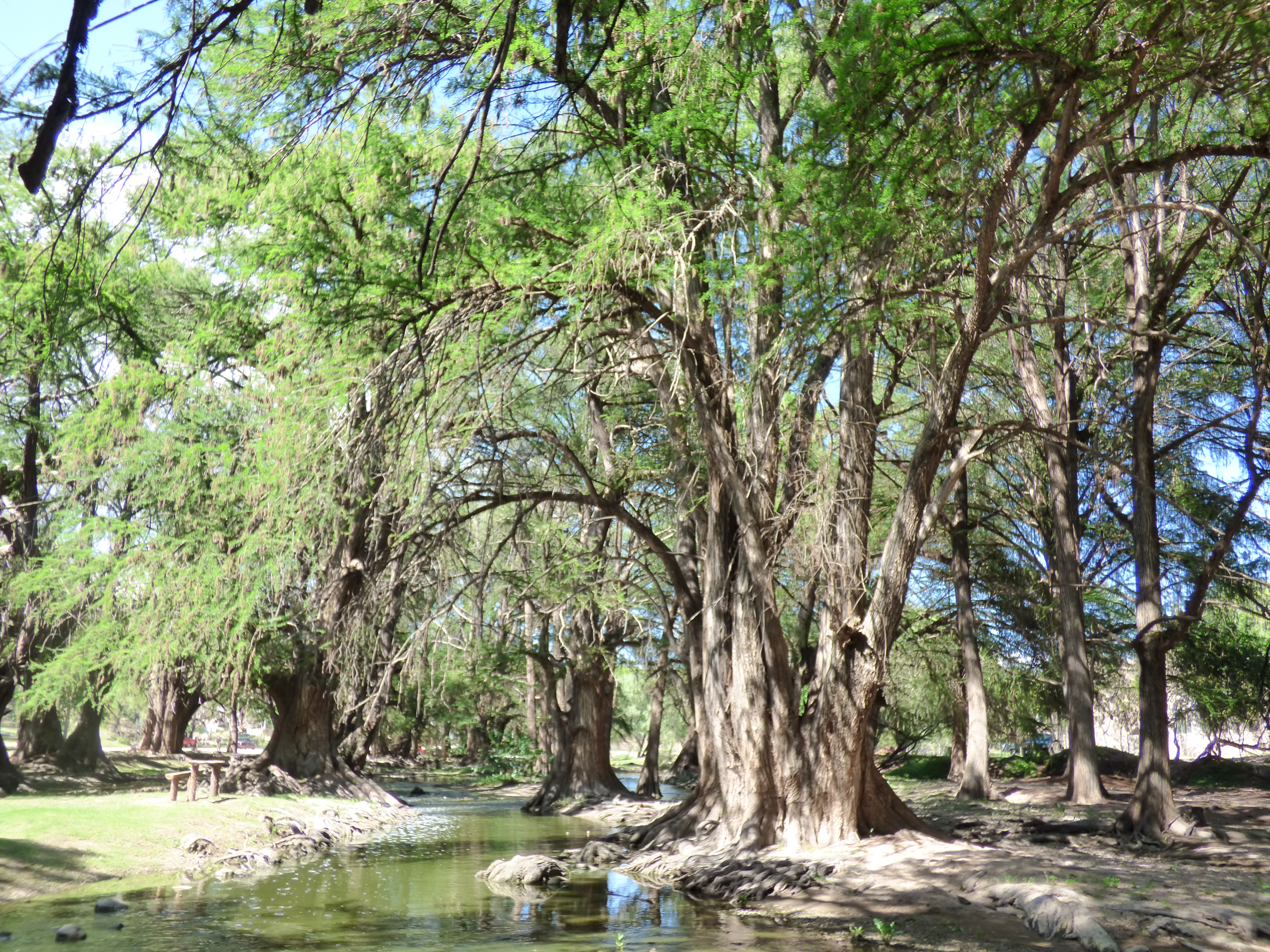
Taxodium mucronatum

== Economy ==
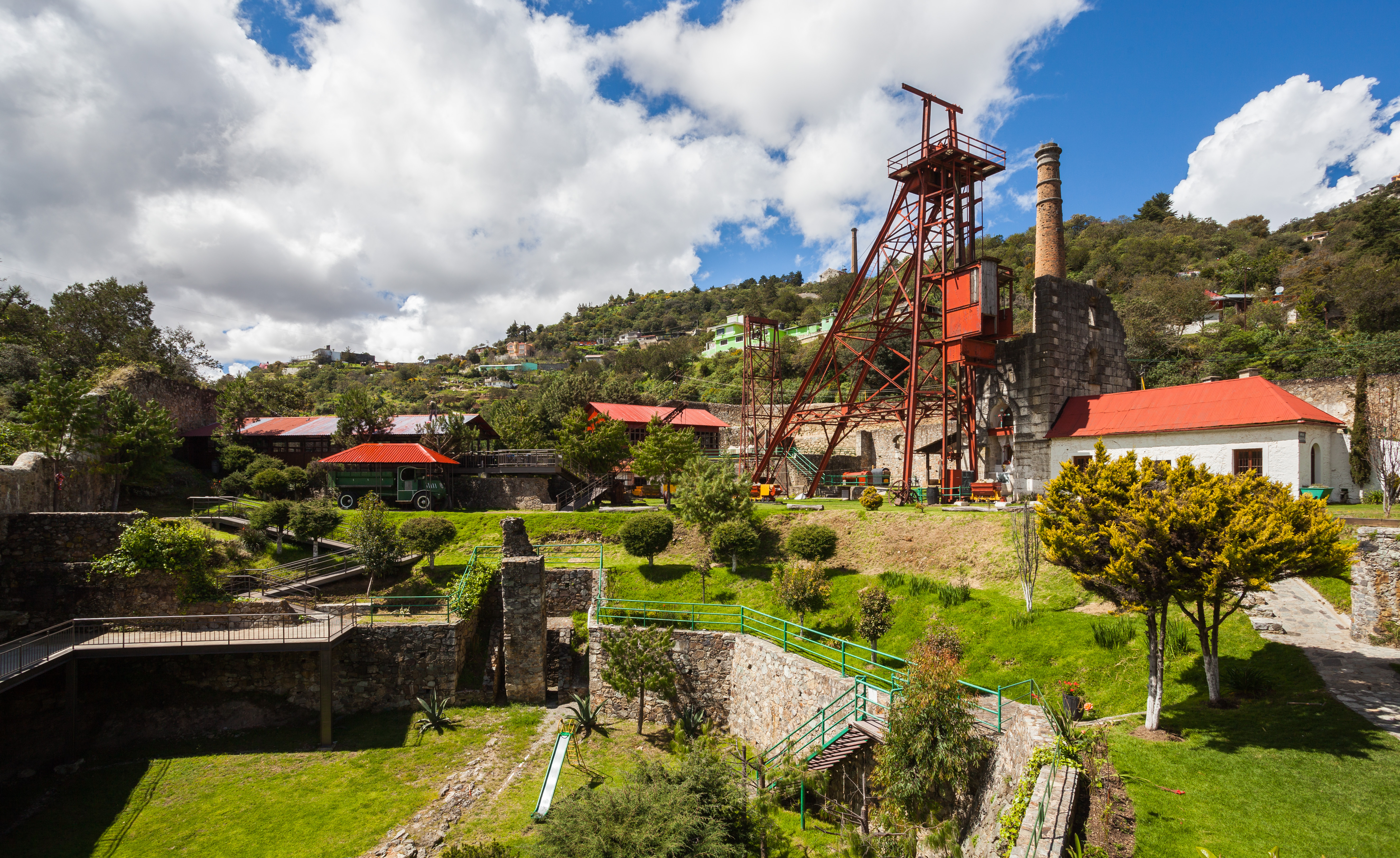
The former Acosta mine, now a museum

Traditionally, Hidalgo's economy has been based on mining and agriculture, with manufacturing more recently. Most industry is located in what is called the “Urban Industrial Corridor of the South," where most of the state's economic activity is located. Outside of this corridor, the economy remains based on subsistence farming and has high levels of poverty, with the per capita income only 61.5% of the national average. Industry accounts for more than 25% of the state's gross domestic product.

However, the state has a higher-than-average growth, averaging 7.7% since the mid-1990s. The state consistently produces an overall surplus. Like other Mexican states, Hidalgo is heavily dependent on the federal government for revenues, with almost 97% of revenues from federal sources, which is high. The state's debt level is very low compared to other rated local and regional governments in Mexico and worldwide. One major debt issue is with pension funds but S&P does not consider it onerous. As of the end of 2000, the state's economic rating by Standard & Poor's was 'mxA-' with a stable outlook.

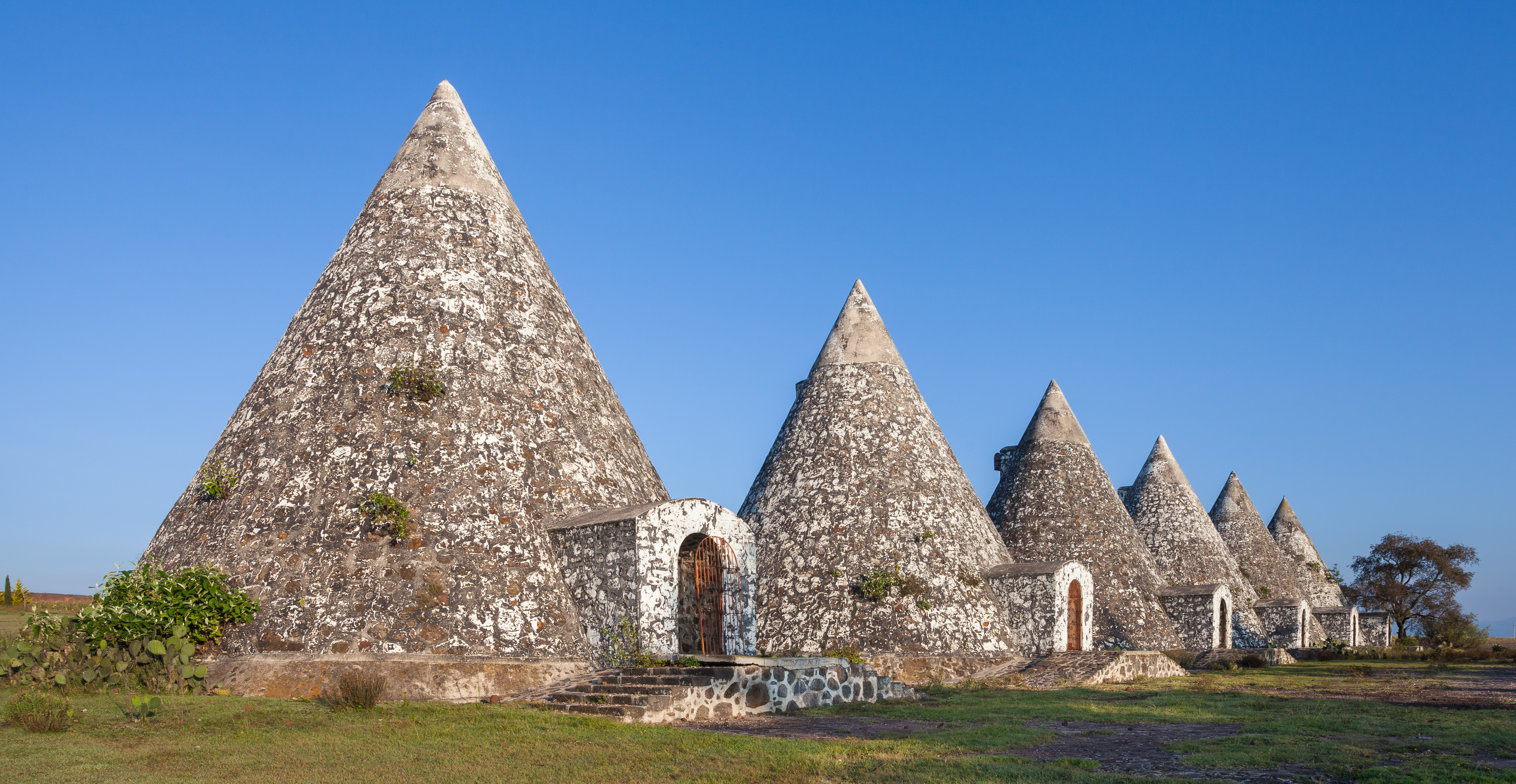
Grain silos in Acatlán

The state contains 2.1 million hectares of land, 30% of which is cultivable. Most of this land is only farmed during the annual rainy season. Corn is the primary crop followed by barley, beans, oats, wheat, green chili peppers, squash and tomatoes. Thirty-eight percent of the land is dedicated to grazing and livestock production. Fishing and fish farming are also important producing mojarra, tilapia, carp, trout and charal. Most of the surface area of the state (38%) is used for the raising of livestock with 29% dedicated to agriculture. Forests cover about 22% of the state. Both pine and broadleaf forests are found in the higher mountain areas of the state. The lower altitude Huasteca has rainforest and semi-rainforest vegetation. Hidalgo has approximately 125,000 m3 of commercial timber with an estimated value of 47,771.701 pesos. Non-wood forest products are estimated to value 331,961 pesos. For much of the 20th century, forest size diminished. This is being countered with reforestation efforts over as much as 743,224 hectares, with about 2,500 hectares fully reforested every year. Just over 25% of the population if employed in agriculture and livestock production.

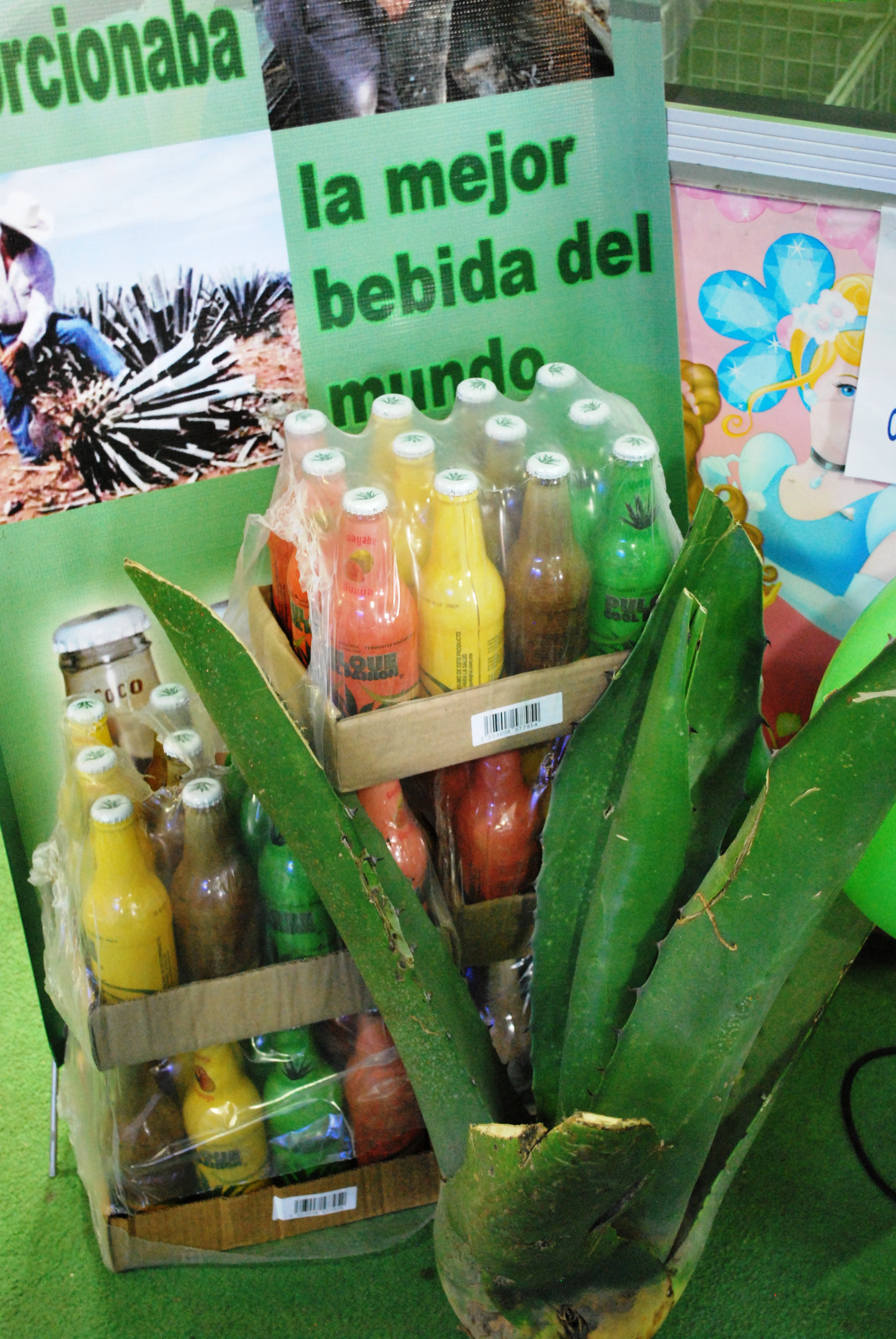
Display of bottled pulque at the Feria de Pachuca

Mining is the oldest and most traditional large-scale economic activity in the state. The mining of magnesium provides the most income to the state, providing 28% of all revenues, followed by zinc (18%), silver (14.3%), limestone (12.9%) and lead (7.7%). Other minerals include gold, copper, cadmium and sulfur. Most precious metals such as gold, silver and copper are mined in Pachuca and Zimapan. Petroleum, natural gas and other similar deposits also exist.

The most important commercial sector of the state is that of retail foodstuffs, especially those selling groceries, meat and poultry. This represented over 40% of the commercial sector in 1998. Just over 30% of commerce was dedicated to non-food products such as clothing and pharmaceuticals with the rest mostly dedicated to wholesale foods. From the latter 20th century, tourism has taken up much of the economic slack left behind by the demise of much of the state's mining industry, with income from this sector surpassing that of the petroleum industry. The state has a variety of historic, cultural and natural attractions. Commerce and tourism employ about 44% of the population.

Industrial production in the state centers on metal products, machinery and equipment, accounting for about 24% of the total. Non-metallic minerals, other than petroleum account for about 25%. However, the most important industry is automobile and train engine production, which is followed by the refining of petroleum products, based mostly in Tula. Automotive and train production is centered in Ciudad Sahagún. Most of the automobiles produced are sold in Mexico City. Other industries include the production of cement in Tula de Allende and textiles in Tepeji del Río and Tulancingo. This employs about 30% of the population.

Construction accounts for about 4% of the economy of Hidalgo, with utilities such as electricity accounting for about the same. Hidalgo produces about 8.7% of the total electricity used in the country.

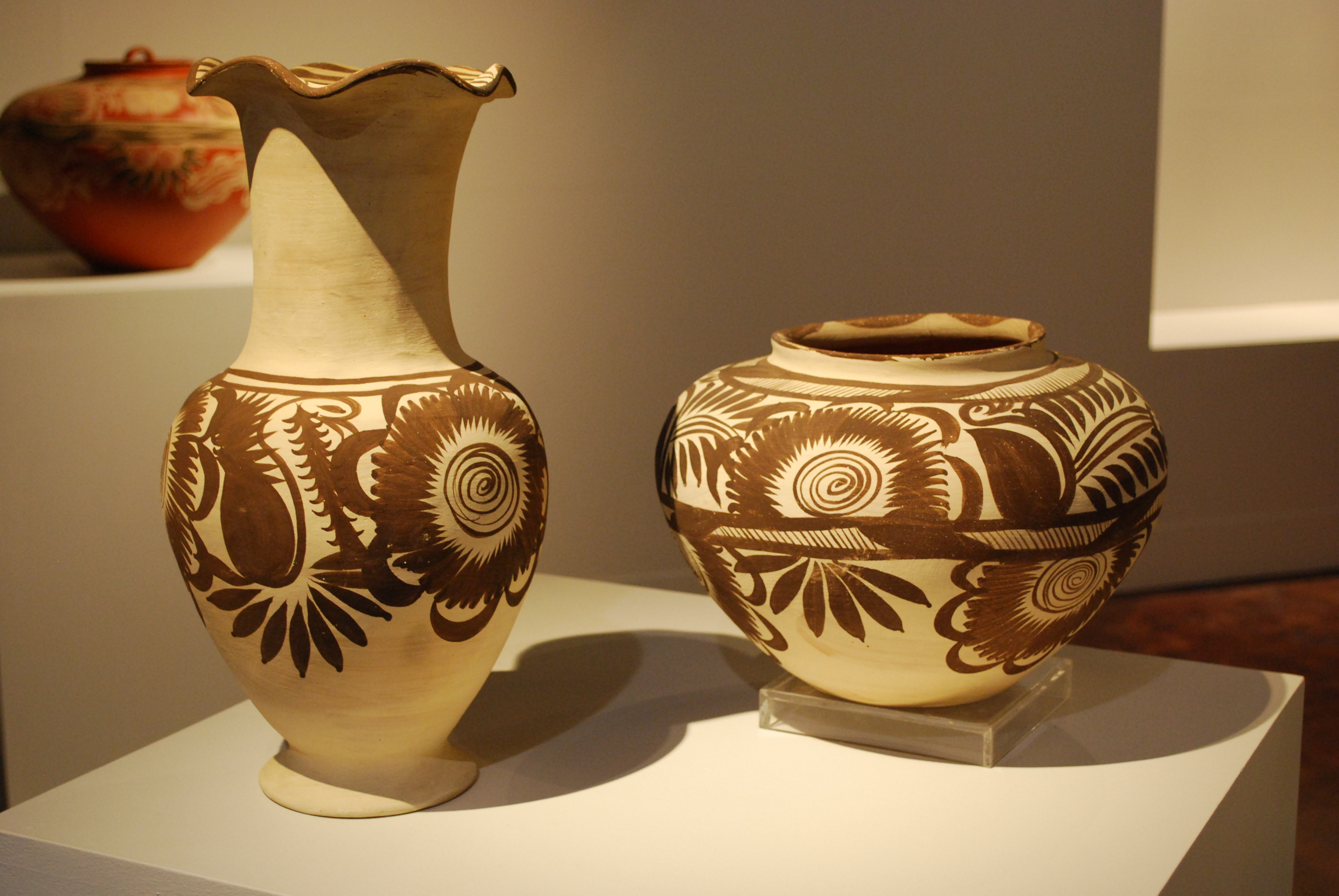
Ceramics by Nicolas Vita Hernandez of Chililco, Huejutla

In many of the more rural parts of the state, the making of crafts such as textiles, baskets, wood items and more can contribute significantly to household income. Textile production is widespread, but some of the best embroidery is done in Tenango de Doria, in which blouses, skirts and more are covered in designs of bright colors. Another area with noted embroidery is Acaxochitlán and nearby communities in the Sierra de Huasteca. The designs on these pieces are endemic to the area. In the Mezquital Valley, they make items with maguey fiber, often for rope, belts, bags and sandals. The weaving of cotton and wool into items such as blankets, wraps and other items is also a widespread craft. Fibers from maguey plants and palm trees are also used in the production of baskets, hats and mats. One native hat made from palm fronds is called "garambullero" as well as a type of rattle. Other materials worked into baskets and other items include reeds, willow branches and ixtle. The working of all these fibres and materials is primarily done by women.

As the state has a relative abundance of wood, crafts based on this material is common. The most important product is the making of wood furniture, most of which is in a rustic Spanish style. Miniature boxes, flutes and other items are a speciality of a community called Nith in the Ixmiquuilpan municipality. Molango is noted for its guitars. Tenango is noted for the making of wooden utensils such as spoons and spatulas. Pottery production is categorized by the type of clay used. In the Tulancingo Valley, the clay type is known as "chapopote" and is mostly worked into pots, comals and other cooking items. Huejutla is known for its "barro blanco" (white clay), also used to make items for cooking. In Huasca de Ocampo red clay is abundant. In Chililico, the clay is ochre and typically painted with images of birds and flowers. The Mezquital Valley and the Comarca Minera area makes a type of pottery which is not glazed, mostly for utilitarian items. In some areas, such as Tulancingo and Chapantongo, Talavera type glazed pottery is also made. Metalworking comes from the state's mining past, where materials such as gold, silver, copper and iron are worked into jewelry, pots, jars, utensils, and railing. Areas best known for their metal working are Pachuca and Real del Monte (jewelry), The Sierra Alta and Tizapán (copper items) and the Mezquital Valley for ironwork.

== Education ==
In the 1999–2000 school year, the state had 7,421 educational centers for grades K-12, with 33,994 teachers and 743,771 students. Only 19.1% of these students are at the middle school level, 8.3% in vocational schools and 3% in preparatory or in higher education. Most of the students at the higher levels are concentrated in municipalities such as Pachuca, Tula de Allende, Huejutla, Ixmiquilpan and Tulancingo. Fifty-three percent of four-year-olds and 95% of five-year-olds attend pre school or kindergarten. Ninety-two percent of those who finish primary school go on to secondary school. Seventy-four percent who finish secondary school go on to high school or vocational school. Of children over six years of age, 93.5% are attending school, which is slightly above the national average of 92.2%, putting Hidalgo in 14th place.

The Universidad Autónoma del Estado de Hidalgo began at the same time the state was founded. In 1869, the Instituto Literario y Escuela de Artes y Oficios, the university's predecessor was founded. It was reorganized in 1872 under the Porfirio Díaz regime and in 1875, the school was moved from the house it was founded in on Allende Street to the former hospital of San Juan de Dios on the west side of Pachuca. The school was closed several times during the Mexican Revolution but was permanently reopened in 1925 as the University of Hidalgo. From the time to the present the school has grown adding new departments such as those in medicine and engineering. In 1948, the school gain autonomy from governmental oversight, changing its name to the current one. This school is the most important in the state as it is organized in the mid-20th century to spur the industrial development on which the state depends today.

== Infrastructure ==
In recent years Hidalgo has experienced an increase in its infrastructure. Telephone coverage is one per 15.3 inhabitants, and 100% of the population has access to radio and/or television broadcasts, both private and public. There are twelve licensed broadcasters in the state, equally divided between private and public organizations.

Newspapers of Hidalgo include El Independiente de Hidalgo, El Reloj de Hidalgo, El Sol de Hidalgo, El Sol de Tulancingo, Milenio Hidalgo, Ruta, Síntesis de Bolsillo Hidalgo, Síntesis, El Periódico de Hidalgo, Unomásuno Hidalgo, and Visto Bueno.

The state contains 7,923 km of highways, most of which (48.2%) are rural roads. Six cities, Pachuca, Huichapan, Molango, Ixmiquilpan, Tizayuca and Zimapan, have air travel facilities. The airport in Pachuca is the largest, with a 1,800 meter runway for both passengers and freight. An average of 4,500 flights enter and leave the facility each year. There are 978.5 km of rail lines with only 60 km in disuse.

== Major communities ==
The state is divided into 84 municipalities. The major communities are:

- Huejutla de Reyes
- Ixmiquilpan
- Pachuca
- Progreso de Obregón
- Ciudad Sahagún
- Tula de Allende
- Tepeji del Río
- Tizayuca
- Tulancingo

== See also ==
- Toltecs
- 2021 Tula River floods

== Bibliography ==
- Jimenez Gonzalez, Victor Manuel, ed. (2010). Hidalgo: Guía para descubrir los encantos del estado [Hidalgo: Guide to discover the charms of the state] (in Spanish). Mexico City: Editorial Océano de Mexico SA de CV. ISBN 978-607-400-319-2.
- Ballesteros García, Víctor Manuel; Cuatepotzo Costeira, Miguel Ángel (2003). Canto de Sol, Hidalgo; Tierra, historia y gente. Pachuca, Hidalgo: Sistema de Educación Pública del Estado de Hidalgo. ISBN 968-751-721-2.
