= Dulce María Muñíz =

Mexican politician

- Born: 30 January 1960 (age 66); Jacala de Ledezma, Hidalgo, Mexico
- Occupation: Deputy
- Political party: PRI

Dulce María Muñíz Martínez (born 30 January 1960) is a Mexican politician affiliated with the PRI. In 2012–2015 she served as a federal deputy in the 62nd Congress, representing Hidalgo's second district.
