= Tasquillo =

Tasquillo Maxei
- Town and municipality
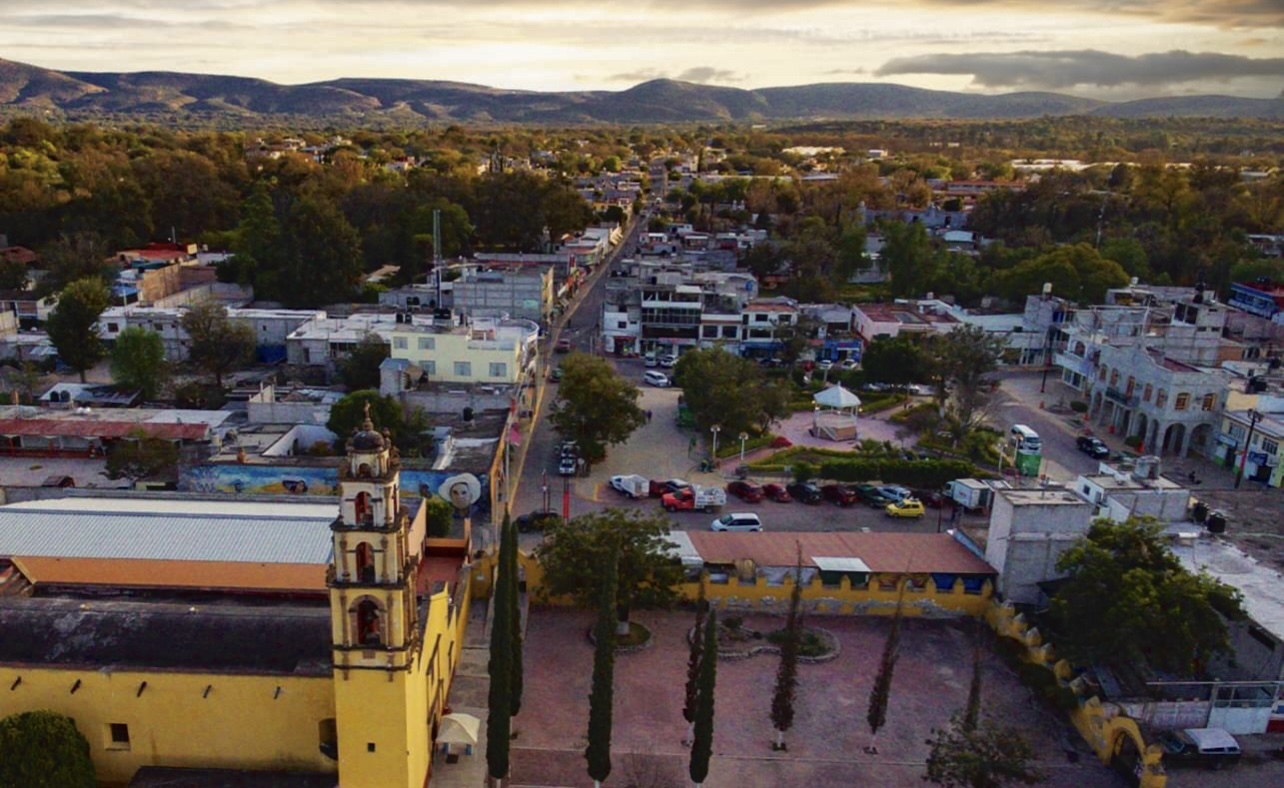
- Tasqullio seen from an aerial view with the Parroquia San Bernardino de Siena seen on the left

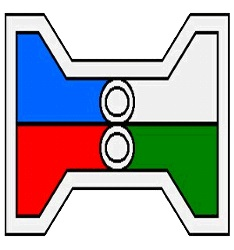
- Coat of arms

- Location within Hidalgo Location within Mexico
- Coordinates: 20°37′N 99°15′W
- Country: Mexico
- State: Hidalgo
- Municipality: Tasquillo

Government
  - Municipal President: Alberto Basilio González
  - Federal electoral district: Hidalgo's 2nd

Area
  - Town and municipality: 240 km^{2} (93 sq mi)
- Elevation: 1,631 m (5,351 ft)

Population (2020)
  - Town and municipality: 17,451
  - Density: 72/km^{2} (190/sq mi)
  - Rural: 13,421
- Demonym(s): Tasquillense; Taquillano
- Time zone: UTC-6 (Zona Centro)
- Postal code: 42380
- Website: tasquillo.gob.mx

Tasquillo (Otomi: Maxei) is a town and one of the 84 municipalities of Hidalgo, in central-eastern Mexico. it is located km 5 from the Mexican Federal Highway 45 and km 10 from the nearby city of Ixmiquilpan in the central west part of the state of Hidalgo.

It has not been possible to clarify whether the word Tasquillo is of origin Otomí or Nahuatl.

== History ==
=== Pre-Colonial Period ===
Tasquillo was populated by a few ethnic groups which were the Nahuas, Toltecs and especially the Otomí groups who have given the name "Mashei" to the place. Among the most important historical events are the discoveries of curious junk, metals, carved stones or sticks and tools of men who were buried in clay pots. It is said that these relics are found in the Huemac.

=== 15th - Early 20th Century ===
In the 15th century under the domination of the Mexica culture it was named Taxco. Later, with the Spanish conquest in the 16th century, it was given the name "town of the natives of San Bernardino," subject to a commission from the Marquis of Zúñiga. and during this time the Spaniards settled at a point called Donijá, which is located southeast of the main square.

In the 17th century it was given the name of Taxquillo, a word composed from Nahuatl or Otomi. In Nahuatl the word comes from the game of tlachtli which means "ball game", In its Otomi dialect the meaning would be "Place of Goats", in Spanish the word of illo means diminutive or small, which gives it another meaning "Small place of the game of ball" or "Small place of goats".

According to what is known by the mayoralties, in the 18th century it was not considered among the towns to citizens due to its lack of importance and poverty-rate, since it was simply a neighborhood and municipal seat of the town-hall of Ixmiquilpan.

=== 1826 - 1920 ===
The constitution of the municipality of Tasquillo is achieved as a town hall belonging to the Huichapan district of the Tula prefecture on 15 February 1826.

From 1861 to 1869, Tasquillo is recorded as a municipality forming part from the Zimapán district of the State of Mexico and eventually becoming a municipality of the Ixmiquilpan district belonging to the Tula department of the State of Mexico. Once the State of Hidalgo was established in 1869, Tasqullio was designated as the head of the Municipality of its name for the Zimapan District, And until 1920 Tasquillo was recorded as a free municipality.

=== Late 20th Century - Present ===
In 1983 The name of the municipality of Tasquillo is modified replacing Taxqullio.

Municipal President María de Jesús Chávez (PRI) died of COVID-19 on January 30, 2021. She took office on December 15, 2020.

== Geography ==
=== Cerro Juarez ===
The Cerro Juarez peak has an elevation of 3,041.29 m (9,978 ft). located in the geographic region of the Mezquital Valley.

=== River Tula ===
The Tula River, a tributary from the Moctezuma River that flows to Zimapan towards the city of Ixmiquilpan, the river passes in-between Cerro Juarez and the town.

=== Climate ===
Climate data for Tasquillo
Month	Jan	Feb	Mar	Apr	May	Jun	Jul	Aug	Sep	Oct	Nov	Dec	Year
Record high °C (°F)	35.0 (95.0)	34.0 (93.2)	37.0 (98.6)	38.0 (100.4)	37.0 (98.6)	37.0 (98.6)	35.0 (95.0)	35.0 (95.0)	34.0 (93.2)	32.0 (89.6)	34.0 (93.2)	34.0 (93.2)	38.0 (100.4)
Mean daily maximum °C (°F)	25.7 (78.3)	26.7 (80.1)	28.3 (82.9)	29.5 (85.1)	30.4 (86.7)	29.6 (85.3)	28.9 (84.0)	28.9 (84.0)	28 (82)	27.2 (81.0)	26.3 (79.3)	25.7 (78.3)	27.9 (82.2)
Daily mean °C (°F)	15.9 (60.6)	16.8 (62.2)	18.7 (65.7)	19.9 (67.8)	20.9 (69.6)	20.6 (69.1)	20.2 (68.4)	20.1 (68.2)	19.4 (66.9)	18.5 (65.3)	17.1 (62.8)	16.2 (61.2)	18.7 (65.7)
Mean daily minimum °C (°F)	6.1 (43.0)	7.1 (44.8)	9.1 (48.4)	10.4 (50.7)	11.3 (52.3)	11.7 (53.1)	11.5 (52.7)	11.3 (52.3)	10.9 (51.6)	9.7 (49.5)	7.9 (46.2)	6.6 (43.9)	9.5 (49.1)
Record low °C (°F)	0 (32)	1 (34)	3 (37)	5 (41)	1 (34)	4 (39)	7 (45)	7 (45)	7 (45)	2 (36)	0 (32)	0 (32)	0 (32)
Average precipitation mm (inches)	6.9 (0.27)	8.5 (0.33)	11 (0.4)	13 (0.5)	29.4 (1.16)	52.4 (2.06)	59.4 (2.34)	43.4 (1.71)	53.4 (2.10)	36 (1.4)	8.1 (0.32)	2.5 (0.10)	324 (12.8)
Average precipitation days (≥ 0.1 mm)	1.1	0.9	1.2	1.5	3.3	4.8	4.4	3.4	4	3.3	1	0.4	29.3
Source: Servicio Meteorologico Nacional

== The Town ==
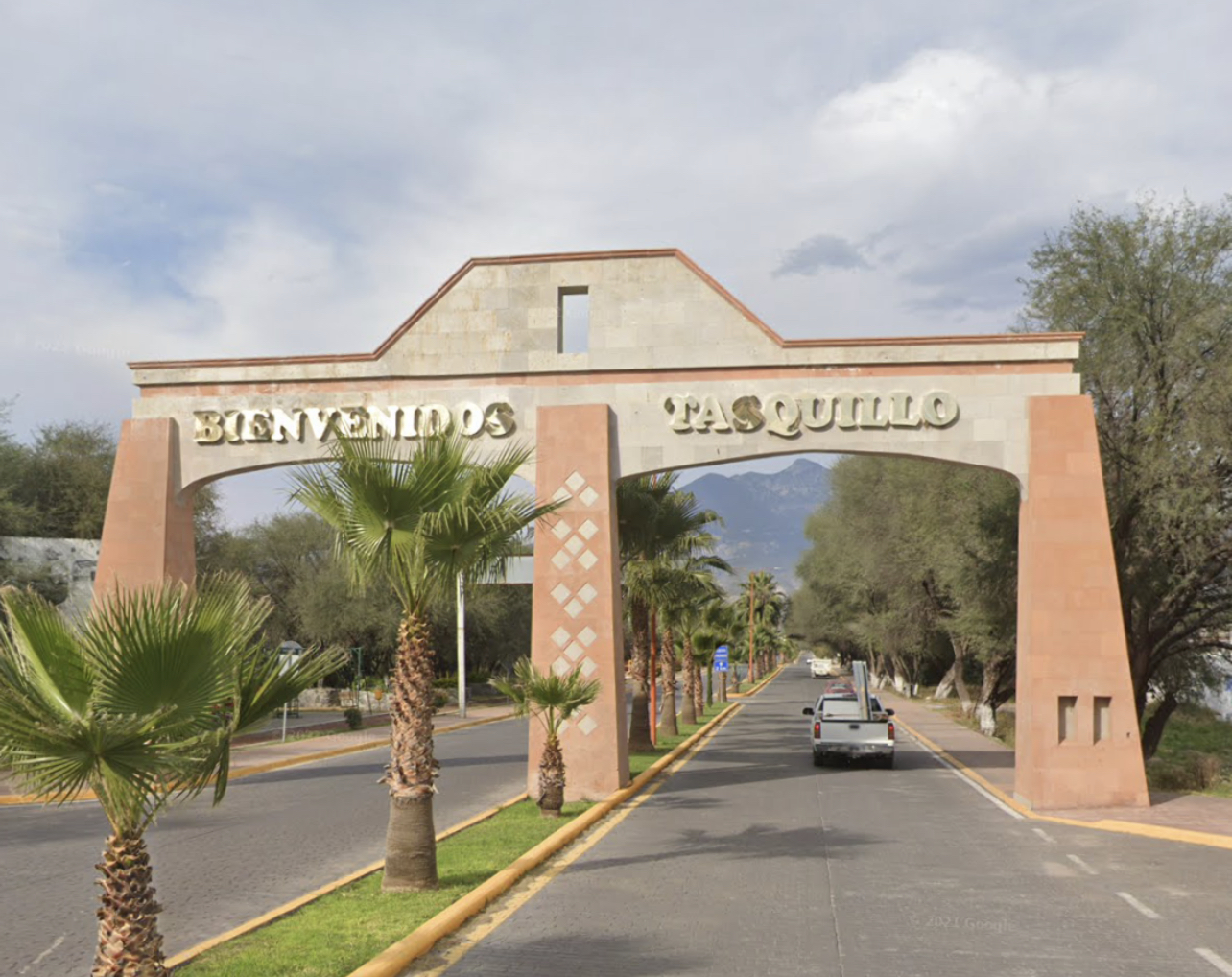
Main road into Tasquillo where the following says above “Welcome Tasqullio”

Tasquillo covers an area of 167 km^{2} with the town having a population of only 4,030 as of 2020.

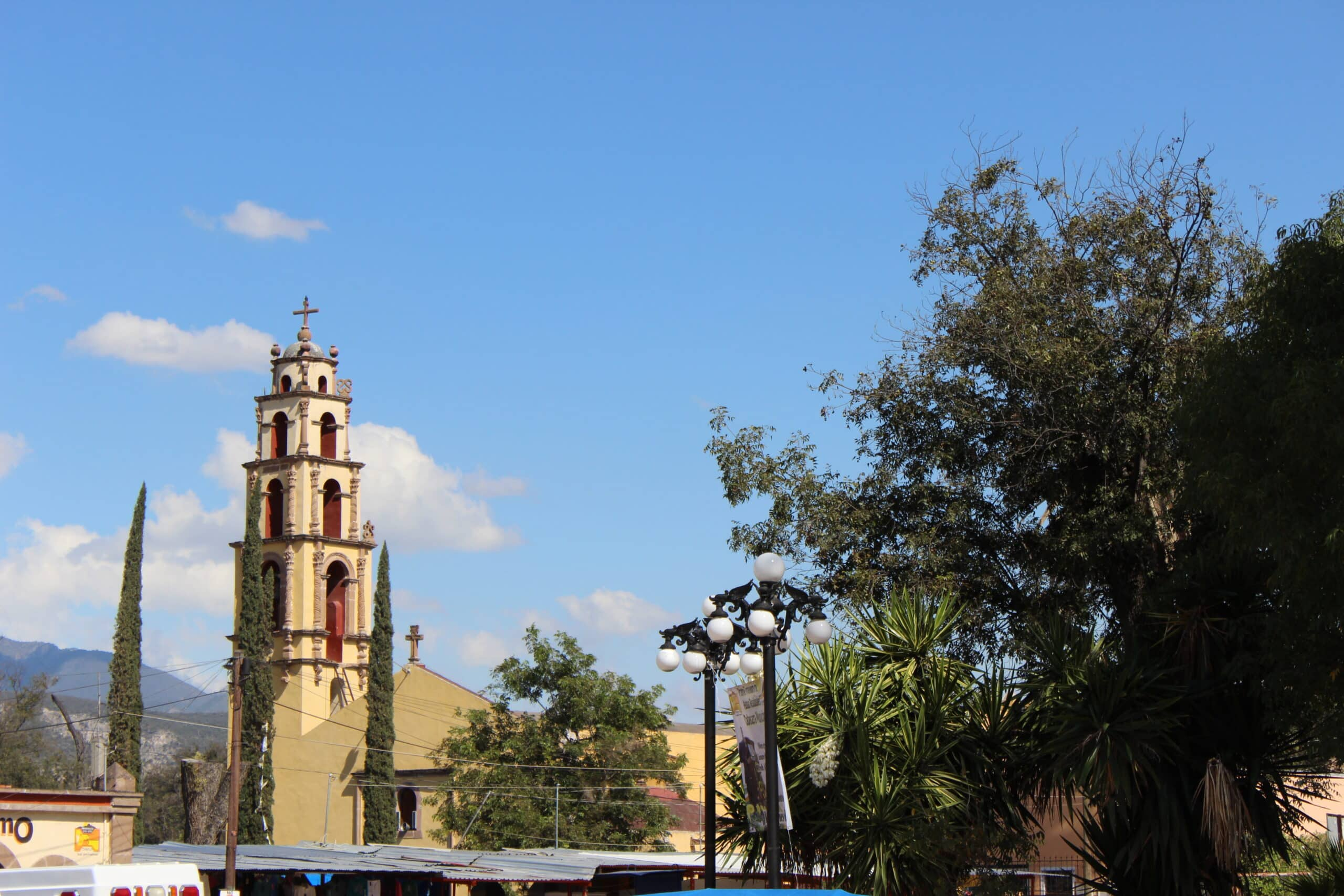
Parroquia of San Bernardino de Siena

=== Parroquia San Bernardino de Siena ===
The Parroquia of San Bernardino de Siena is a church located in the center of the town. Which was founded in 1560 and dedicated to the Italian saint Bernardino of Siena. The church has baroque style architecture and is located in the center of the city. The parish is known for its annual festival in honor of San Bernardino of Siena, which is celebrated on May 20.

== Municipality ==
The municipality itself has an area of 240.01 km^{2} within the Mezquital Valley with the municipality having a total population of 17,451 as of 2020. It borders with the municipalities of Tecozautla, Zimapán, Ixmiquilpan, Alfajayucan, Alfajayucan and Tecozautla.

=== Demographics ===
Historical population
Year	Pop.	±%
1900	874	—
1967	10,245	+1072.2%
1995	16,926	+65.2%
2000	16,648	−1.6%
2005	15,429	−7.3%
2010	16,865	+9.3%
2020	17,451	+3.5%

== See also ==
- 2021 Tula River floods
