= Roberto Pedraza Martínez =

Mexican politician (born 1952)

- Born: 1 May 1952 (age 74); Ixmiquilpan, Hidalgo, Mexico
- Occupation: Politician
- Political party: PRI

Roberto Pedraza Martínez (born 1 May 1952) is a Mexican politician affiliated with the Institutional Revolutionary Party (PRI).

He has served in the Chamber of Deputies on two occasions: during the 56th Congress (1994–1997), representing Hidalgo's fourth district, and during the 59th Congress (2003–2006), representing Hidalgo's second district. He was also municipal president of Ixmiquilpan from 1991 to 1994.
