= José Edmundo Ramírez Martínez =

Mexican politician (born 1968)

- Born: 4 November 1968 (age 57); Ixmiquilpan, Hidalgo, Mexico
- Other name: Edmundo Ramírez "Mundo Ramírez"
- Occupation: Politician
- Political party: PRI

José Edmundo Ramírez Martínez (born 4 November 1968) is a Mexican politician affiliated with the Institutional Revolutionary Party (PRI). In 2006–2009 he served as a federal deputy in the 60th Congress, representing Hidalgo's second district.
