= 2nd federal electoral district of Hidalgo =

Federal electoral district of Mexico

Hidalgo's 2nd
- Electoral district of the Chamber of Deputies of Mexico

- 2nd district since 2023

Incumbent
- Member: Ciria Yamile Salomón Durán
- Party: ▌Ecologist Green Party
- Congress: 66th (2024–2027)

District
- State: Hidalgo
- Head town: Ixmiquilpan
- Coordinates: 20°30′N 99°13′W
- Covers: 18 municipalities: Alfajayucan, Cardonal, Chapulhuacán, Chilcuautla, Ixmiquilpan, Jacala de Ledezma, La Misión, Mixquiahuala de Juárez, Nicolás Flores, Pacula, Pisaflores, Progreso de Obregón, San Salvador, Santiago de Anaya, Tasquillo, Tecozautla, Tlahuiltepa, Zimapán
- PR region: Fourth
- Precincts: 413
- Population: 461,000 (2020 census)
- Indigenous: Yes (60%)

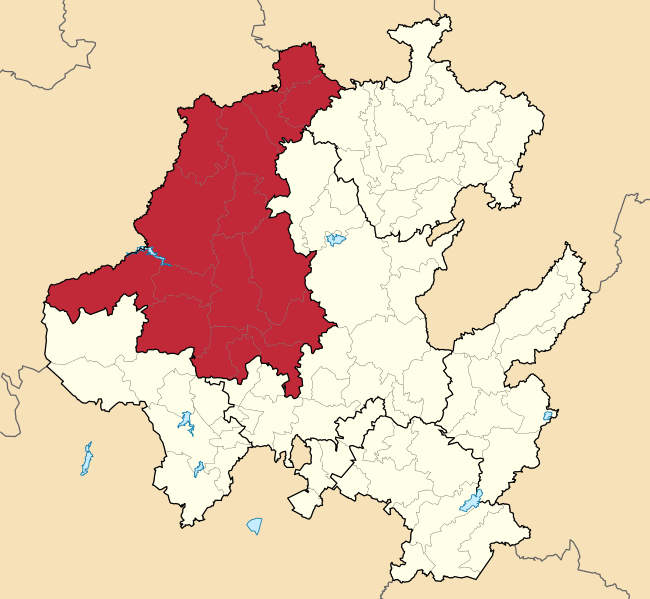
2nd district in 2017–2022

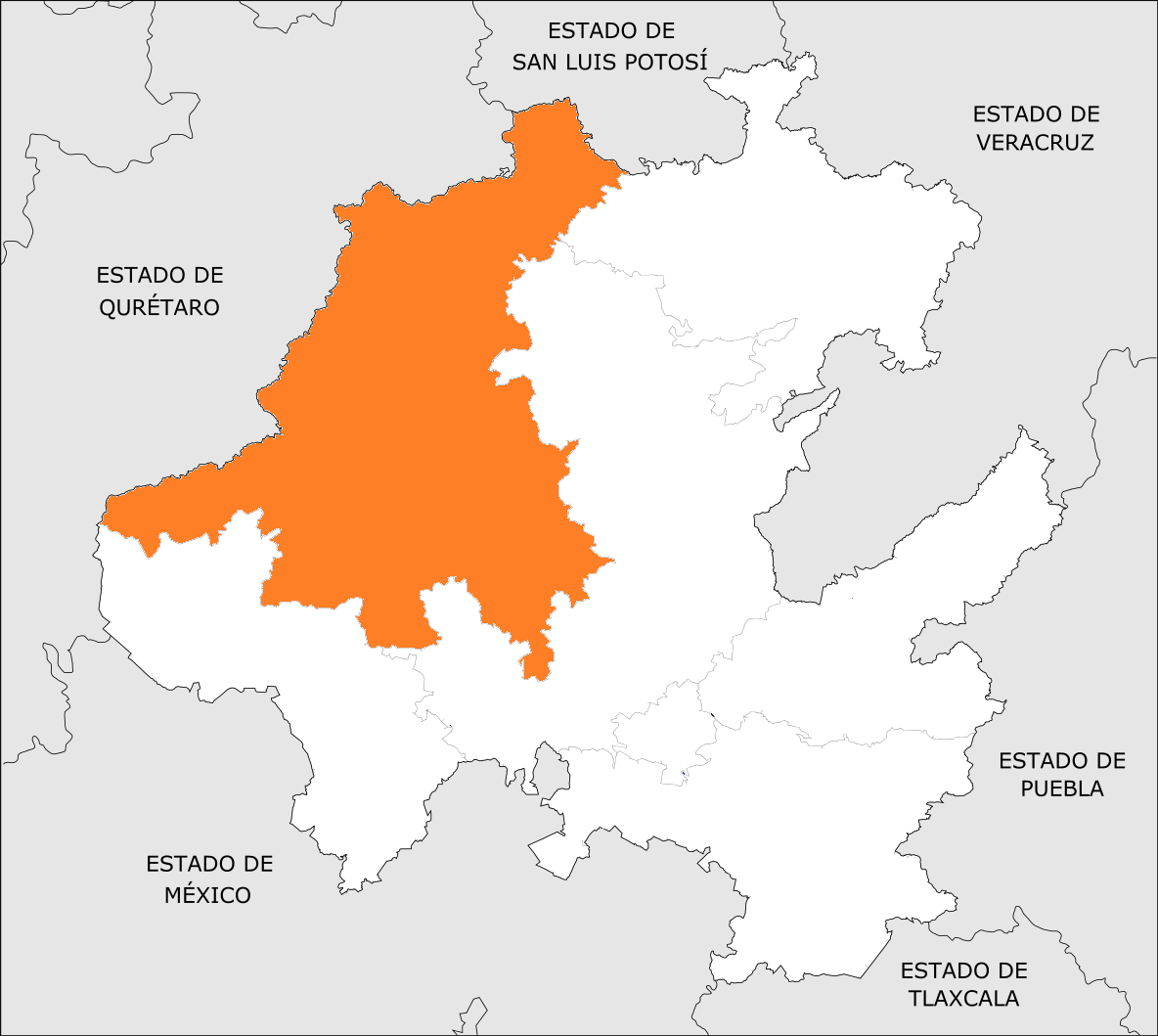
2nd district in 2005–2017

The 2nd federal electoral district of Hidalgo (Spanish: Distrito electoral federal 02 de Hidalgo) is one of the 300 electoral districts into which Mexico is divided for elections to the federal Chamber of Deputies and one of seven such districts in the state of Hidalgo.

It elects one deputy to the lower house of Congress for each three-year legislative period by means of the first-past-the-post system. Votes cast in the district also count towards the calculation of proportional representation ("plurinominal") deputies elected from the fourth electoral region. (Note: Between 2005 and 2023, Hidalgo was assigned to the fifth region.)

The current member for the district, re-elected in the 2024 general election, is Ciria Yamile Salomón Durán of the Ecologist Green Party of Mexico (PVEM).

== District territory ==
Under the 2023 districting plan adopted by the National Electoral Institute (INE), which is to be used for the 2024, 2027 and 2030 federal elections, the district covers 413 electoral precincts (secciones electorales) across the north-western portion of the state. Its head town (cabecera distrital), where results from individual polling stations are gathered together and tallied, is the city of Ixmiquilpan. In addition to Ixmiquilpan, it covers another 17 adjacent municipalities:

- Alfajayucan, Cardonal, Chapulhuacán, Chilcuautla, Jacala de Ledezma, La Misión, Mixquiahuala de Juárez, Nicolás Flores, Pacula, Pisaflores, Progreso de Obregón, San Salvador, Santiago de Anaya, Tasquillo, Tecozautla, Tlahuiltepa and Zimapán.

The district reported a population of 461,000 in the 2020 census and, with Indigenous and Afrodescendent inhabitants accounting for over 60% of that total, it is classified by the INE as an indigenous district. (Note: The INE deems any local or federal electoral district where Indigenous or Afrodescendent inhabitants number 40% or more of the total population to be an indigenous district.)

== Previous districting schemes ==
Evolution of electoral district numbers
	1974	1978	1996	2005	2017	2023
Hidalgo	5	6	7	7	7	7
Chamber of Deputies	196	300				

2017–2022

Between 2017 and 2022, the district comprised Ixmiquilpan (the head town) and another 15 municipalities:
- Alfajayucan, Cardonal, Chapulhuacán, Chilcuautla, Jacala de Ledezma, La Misión, Nicolás Flores, Pacula, Pisaflores, Progreso de Obregón, San Salvador, Santiago de Anaya, Tasquillo, Tecozautla and Zimapán.
In other words, the 2023 configuration without Mixquiahuala and Tlahuiltepa.

2005–2017

Under the districting scheme in force from 2005 to 2017, the district covered Ixmiquilpan and another 14 municipalities. The configuration was almost the same as in the 2017–2022 plan: the only change was that Progreso de Obregón was assigned to the 3rd district.

1996–2005

The 1996 redistricting process created Hidalgo's 7th district. Between 1996 and 2005, the second district comprised Ixmiquilpan and 13 other municipalities:
- Alfajayucan, Cardonal, Chapulhuacán, Chilcuautla, Huichapan, Ixmiquilpan, Jacala de Ledezma, La Misión, Nicolás Flores, Pacula, Pisaflores, Tasquillo, Tecozautla and Zimapán.

1978–1996

The districting scheme in force from 1978 to 1996 was the result of the 1977 electoral reforms, which increased the number of single-member seats in the Chamber of Deputies from 196 to 300. Under that plan, Hidalgo's seat allocation rose from five to six. The 2nd district was in the east of the state, with its head town at Tulancingo, and it comprised 13 municipalities:
- Acatlán, Acaxochitlán, Agua Blanca, Almoloya, Apan, Cuautepec, Huehuetla, Metepec, San Bartolo Tutotepec, Santiago Tulantepec, Singuilucan, Tenango de Doria and Tulancingo.

== Deputies returned to Congress ==
(Mexico) National parties
- Current
- PAN
- PRI
- PT
- PVEM
- MC
- Morena
- PAZ
- Somos
- Defunct or local only
- PLM
- PNR
- PRM
- PNM
- PP
- PPS
- PARM
- PFCRN
- CON
- PANAL
- PSD
- PES
- PES
- PRD

Hidalgo's 2nd district
Election	Deputy	Party	Term	Legislature
1916	Leopoldo Ruiz		1916–1917	Constituent Congress of Querétaro
1917	Nicasio Jurado		1917–1918	27th Congress
1918	Leopoldo E. Camarena		1918–1920	28th Congress
1920	Leopoldo E. Camarena		1920–1922	29th Congress
1922	Adalberto Lazcano Carrasco		1922–1924	30th Congress
1924	José L. Galván		1924–1926	31st Congress
1926	Javier Rojo Gómez		1926–1928	32nd Congress
1928	Leopoldo E. Camarena		1928–1930	33rd Congress
1930	Daniel Olivares	Institutional Revolutionary Party	1930–1932	34th Congress
1932	Ambrosio Ordaz	Institutional Revolutionary Party	1932–1934	35th Congress
1934	José Gómez Esparza	Institutional Revolutionary Party	1934–1937	36th Congress
1937	Honorato Austria	Institutional Revolutionary Party	1937–1940	37th Congress
1940	Leonardo M. Hernández		1940–1943	38th Congress
1943	Ramón G. Bonfil	Institutional Revolutionary Party	1943–1946	39th Congress
1946	Galileo Bustos Valle	Institutional Revolutionary Party	1946–1949	40th Congress
1949	Miguel Ángel Cortés	Institutional Revolutionary Party	1949–1952	41st Congress
1952	José Luis Suárez Molina	Institutional Revolutionary Party	1952–1955	42th Congress
1955	Manuel Sánchez Vite	Institutional Revolutionary Party	1955–1958	43rd Congress
1958	Manuel Yáñez Ruiz	Institutional Revolutionary Party	1958–1961	44th Congress
1961	José Luis Suárez Molina	Institutional Revolutionary Party	1961–1964	45th Congress
1964	Vacant		1964–1967	46th Congress
1967	Raúl Vargas Ortiz	Institutional Revolutionary Party	1967–1970	47th Congress
1970	Antonio Hernández García	Institutional Revolutionary Party	1970–1973	48th Congress
1973	Óscar Bravo Santos	Institutional Revolutionary Party	1973–1976	49th Congress
1976	Luis José Dorantes Segovia	Institutional Revolutionary Party	1976–1979	50th Congress
1979	Ernesto Gil Elorduy	Institutional Revolutionary Party	1979–1982	51st Congress
1982	Julieta Guevara Bautista	Institutional Revolutionary Party	1982–1985	52nd Congress
1985	Roberto Valdespino Castillo	Institutional Revolutionary Party	1985–1988	53rd Congress
1988	Alberto Assad Ávila	Institutional Revolutionary Party	1988–1991	54th Congress
1991	José Guadarrama Márquez	Institutional Revolutionary Party	1991–1994	55th Congress
1994	Aurelio Marín Huazo	Institutional Revolutionary Party	1994–1997	56th Congress
1997	Roberto Castilla Hernández	Institutional Revolutionary Party	1997–2000	57th Congress
2000	Celia Martínez Bárcenas	Institutional Revolutionary Party	2000–2003	58th Congress
2003	Roberto Pedraza Martínez	Institutional Revolutionary Party	2003–2006	59th Congress
2006	José Edmundo Ramírez Martínez	Institutional Revolutionary Party	2006–2009	60th Congress
2009	Héctor Pedraza Olguín	Institutional Revolutionary Party	2009–2012	61st Congress
2012	Dulce María Muñiz Martínez	Institutional Revolutionary Party	2012–2015	62nd Congress
2015	Rosa Guadalupe Chávez Acosta	Institutional Revolutionary Party	2015–2018	63rd Congress
2018	Cipriano Charrez Pedraza (Note: Charrez Pedraza was impeached and removed from office on 24 April 2019.); Gustavo Callejas Romero	National Regeneration Movement	2018–2019; 2019–2021	64th Congress
2021	Ciria Yamile Salomón Durán	Ecologist Green Party of Mexico	2021–2024	65th Congress
2024	Ciria Yamile Salomón Durán	Ecologist Green Party of Mexico	2024–2027	66th Congress

== Presidential elections ==
Hidalgo's 2nd district
Election	District won by	Party or coalition	%
2018	Andrés Manuel López Obrador	Juntos Haremos Historia	62.4468
2024	Claudia Sheinbaum Pardo	Sigamos Haciendo Historia	71.1379
