= Héctor Pedraza Olguín =

Mexican politician (born 1966)

- Born: 30 August 1966 (age 59); Ixmiquilpan, Hidalgo, Mexico
- Occupation: Politician
- Political party: PRI

Héctor Pedraza Olguín (born 30 August 1966) is a Mexican politician from the Institutional Revolutionary Party (PRI). From 2009 to 2012 he served as a federal deputy in the 61st Congress, representing Hidalgo's second district.
