= Uxdejhé =

- Locality
- Location within Hidalgo Location within Mexico
- Coordinates: 20°34′51″N 99°40′03″W
- Country: Mexico
- State: Hidalgo
- Municipality: Tecozautla
- Elevation: 1,749 m (5,738 ft)

Population (2020)
  - Total: 874

Uxdejhé is locality in the municipality of Tecozautla, in the state of Hidalgo in central-eastern Mexico.

== Geography ==
Uxdejhé is located in Mezquital Valley. The locality has the geographic coordinates at 20°34′51″N 99°40′03″W and an altitude of 1,749 m (5,738 ft).

In terms of physiography, Uxdejhé is part of the Trans-Mexican Volcanic Belt, within the subprovince of the Sierras y Llanuras de Querétaro and Hidalgo; its terrain is hilly. With regard to hydrography, it is positioned in the hydrological region of the Pánuco River, within the Moctezuma River basin and the San Juan River sub-basin.

Uxdejhé has a semi-arid, semi-warm climate.

== Demographics ==
In 2020, Uxdejhé had a population of 874 people, which corresponds to 2.30% of the locality's population in which 419 were men and 455 were women.
