= Tlahuiltepa =

- Town and municipality
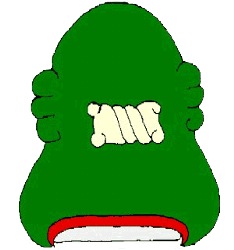
- Coat of arms

- Location within Hidalgo Location within Mexico
- Coordinates: 20°55′24″N 98°56′59″W
- Country: Mexico
- State: Hidalgo
- Municipality: Tlahuiltepa

Government
  - Federal electoral district: Hidalgo's 2nd

Area
  - Total: 467.7 km^{2} (180.6 sq mi)

Population (2005)
  - Total: 9,264
- Time zone: UTC-6 (Zona Centro)

Tlahuiltepa is a town and one of the 84 municipalities of Hidalgo, in central-eastern Mexico. The municipality covers an area of 467.7 km^{2} (180.6 sq mi).

As of 2005, the municipality had a total population of 9,264.
