= Pacula =

- Town and municipality
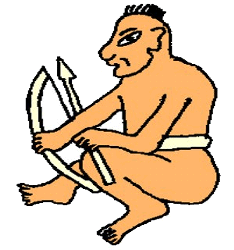
- Coat of arms

- Location within Hidalgo Location within Mexico
- Coordinates: 21°02′59″N 99°17′44″W
- Country: Mexico
- State: Hidalgo
- Municipality: Pacula

Government
  - Federal electoral district: Hidalgo's 2nd

Area
  - Total: 429 km^{2} (166 sq mi)

Population (2005)
  - Total: 4,522
- Time zone: UTC-6 (Zona Centro)
- Website: pacula.gob.mx

Pacula is a town and one of the 84 municipalities of Hidalgo, in central-eastern Mexico. The municipality covers an area of 429 km^{2} (166 sq mi).

As of 2005, the municipality had a total population of 4,522.
