= Chapulhuacán =

- Town and municipality
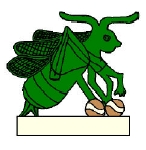
- Coat of arms

- Location within Hidalgo Location within Mexico
- Coordinates: 21°09′17″N 98°54′14″W
- Country: Mexico
- State: Hidalgo
- Municipality: Chapulhuacán

Government
  - Federal electoral district: Hidalgo's 2nd

Area
  - Total: 239 km^{2} (92 sq mi)

Population (2005)
  - Total: 20,577
- Time zone: UTC-6 (Zona Centro)
- Website: chapulhuacan.gob.mx

Chapulhuacán (Otomi: Mät’äxi) is a town and one of the 84 municipalities of Hidalgo, in central-eastern Mexico. The municipality covers an area of 239 km^{2} (92 sq mi).

As of 2005, the municipality had a total population of 20,577. In 2012 there were 1,758 inhabitants who spoke an indigenous language, primarily Nahuatl.
