= Cerro Prieto, Hidalgo =

Rural town in La Mision, Mexico

Coordinates: 20°52′45″N 99°24′05″W

Cerro Prieto is a small rural town located in the county of La Misión in the northwestern part of the Mexican state of Hidalgo. The geography of Cerro Prieto and the surrounding communities is mountainous and semi-temperate, as per characteristic of the Sierra Gorda region. Mornings are known for cold breezes and misty conditions, while as the sun rises, high temperatures might be expected. The economic activity consists of the growth and sale of local crops, especially a wide variety of spicy chilis, to neighboring towns. The municipal cities of La Mision as well as Jacala de Ledezma serve as major trade hubs as well the housing of the closest hospitals. Subsistence agriculture is practiced on the side by a large segment of the population. Socially, the majority of the residents identify as Roman Catholics, with a minority practicing a form of Evangelical Protestantism. Many families, in an effort to escape the cycle of rural poverty and/or to improve their economic situation, have had members migrate to Mexico City, the state's capital Pachuca, and more prominently, the US. Like many Latin Americans abroad, the residents of Cerro Prieto living abroad save part of their earnings to the construction of upgraded houses.
