= La Misión, Hidalgo =

La Misión
- Town and municipality
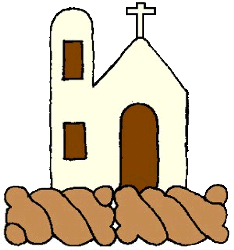
- Coat of arms

- Location within Hidalgo Location within Mexico
- Coordinates: 21°06′N 99°08′W
- Country: Mexico
- State: Hidalgo
- Municipality: La Misión

Government
  - Federal electoral district: Hidalgo's 2nd

Area
  - Total: 179.9 km^{2} (69.5 sq mi)

Population (2005)
  - Total: 10,096
- Time zone: UTC-6 (Zona Centro)
- Website: lamision.gob.mx

La Misión is a town and one of the 84 municipalities of Hidalgo, in central-eastern Mexico. The municipality covers an area of 179.9 km^{2}.

The first Spanish colonisers named the town "Cibola", and it was later named "The Mission" by the Franciscan friars that arrived there in later years.

As of 2005, the municipality had a total population of 10,096.

== See also ==
- Cerro Prieto, Hidalgo, a rural settlement in the municipality
