= Progreso, Hidalgo =

Progreso de Obregón
- Town and municipality
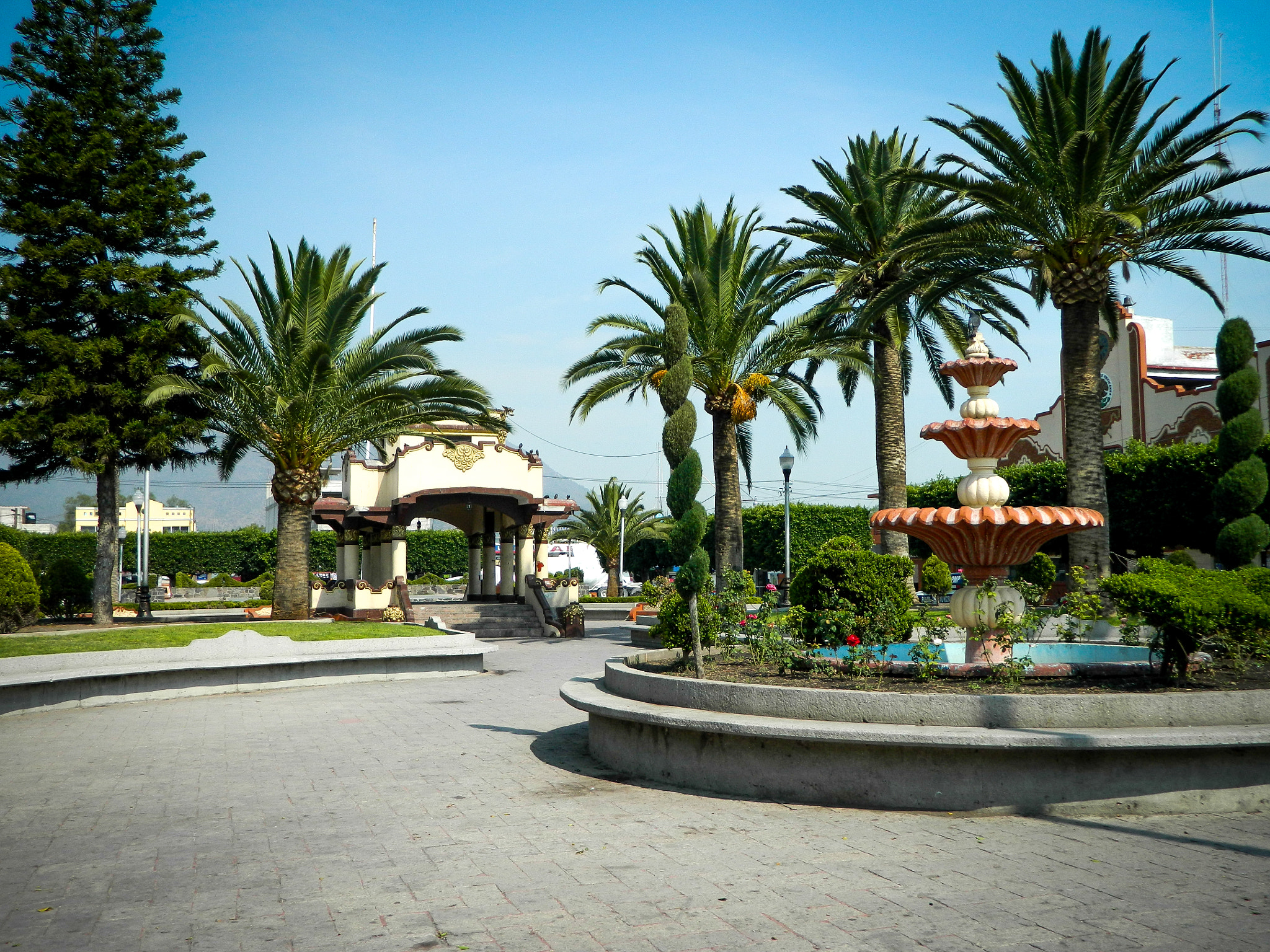
- Main square, Progreso de Obregón

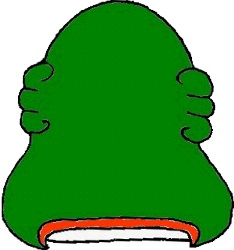
- Coat of arms

- Location within Hidalgo Location within Mexico
- Coordinates: 20°15′N 99°11′W
- Country: Mexico
- State: Hidalgo
- Municipality: Progreso de Obregón

Government
  - Federal electoral district: Hidalgo's 2nd

Area
  - Total: 106 km^{2} (41 sq mi)

Population (2005)
  - Total: 4,630
- Time zone: UTC-6 (Zona Centro)
- Website: progresoobregon.gob.mx

Progreso (officially: Progreso de Obregón) is a community and one of the 84 municipalities of Hidalgo, in central-eastern Mexico, located at 20°15′00″N 99°11′00″W. The municipality covers an area of 106 square kilometres (41 sq mi).

Progreso de Obregón used to be part of the municipality of Mixquiahuala de Juárez. It started as a small village next to the Tula River called La Salitrera, but due to constant flooding, the villagers looked for higher ground and established a new village called La Venta in 1826. Thanks to its location (just in the middle of Valle del Mezquital), La Venta became an important economic center and the village grew. After a visit by president Álvaro Obregón the town changed its name to Progreso de Obregón.

On January 15, 1970, Progreso de Obregón emancipated from Mixquiahuala and became a municipality of its own.

As of 2005, the municipality had a total population of 4,630.
