= Ixmiquilpan =

Ixmiquilpan Ntsʼu̱tkʼani
- Town and Municipality
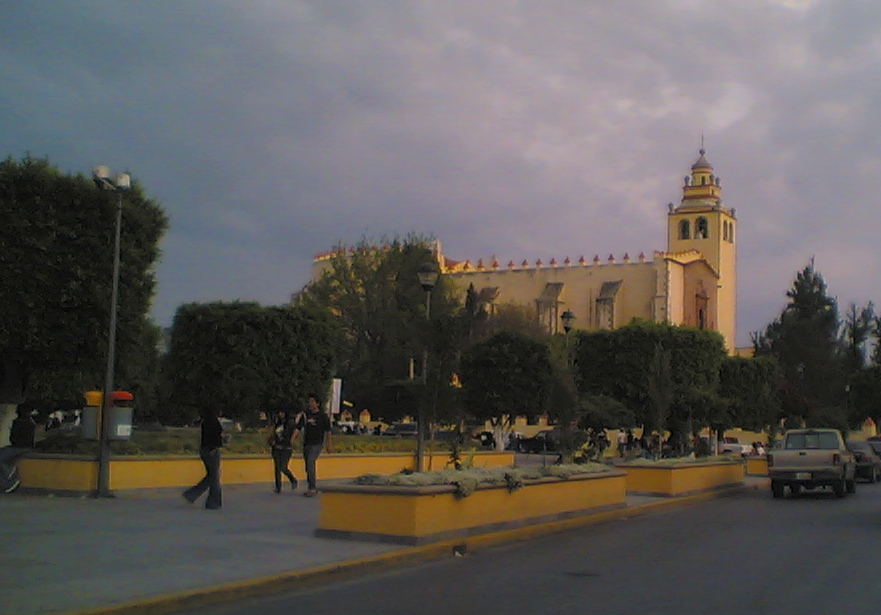
- Main plaza of Ixmiquilpan

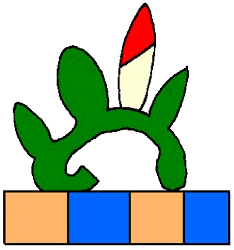
- Coat of arms

- Location in Mexico Ixmiquilpan (Mexico)
- Coordinates: 20°28′55″N 99°13′05″W
- Country: Mexico
- State: Hidalgo
- Municipality: Ixmiquilpan
- Founded: 1550

Government
  - Municipal President (Major): José Manuel Zúñiga Guerrrero (2006–2009)

Area
  - Municipality: 565.3 km^{2} (218.3 sq mi)
- Elevation (of seat): 1,700 m (5,600 ft)

Population (2020)
  - Municipality: 98,654
  - Seat: 98,654
- Time zone: UTC-6 (Central (US Central))
- Postal code (of seat): 42300
- Website: (in Spanish) site

Ixmiquilpan (Otomi: Ntsʼu̱tkʼani) is a city and one of the 84 municipalities of Hidalgo, in central-eastern Mexico. It is located on the Mexico City/Nuevo Laredo Highway at km 170 in the central west part of the state of Hidalgo. The town of Ixmiquilpan is noted for its parish church, Church of San Miguel Arcángel, which contains a large series of murals done in the 16th century by native artists depicting Eagle and Jaguar warriors in battle, along with other pre-Hispanic imagery.

== History ==
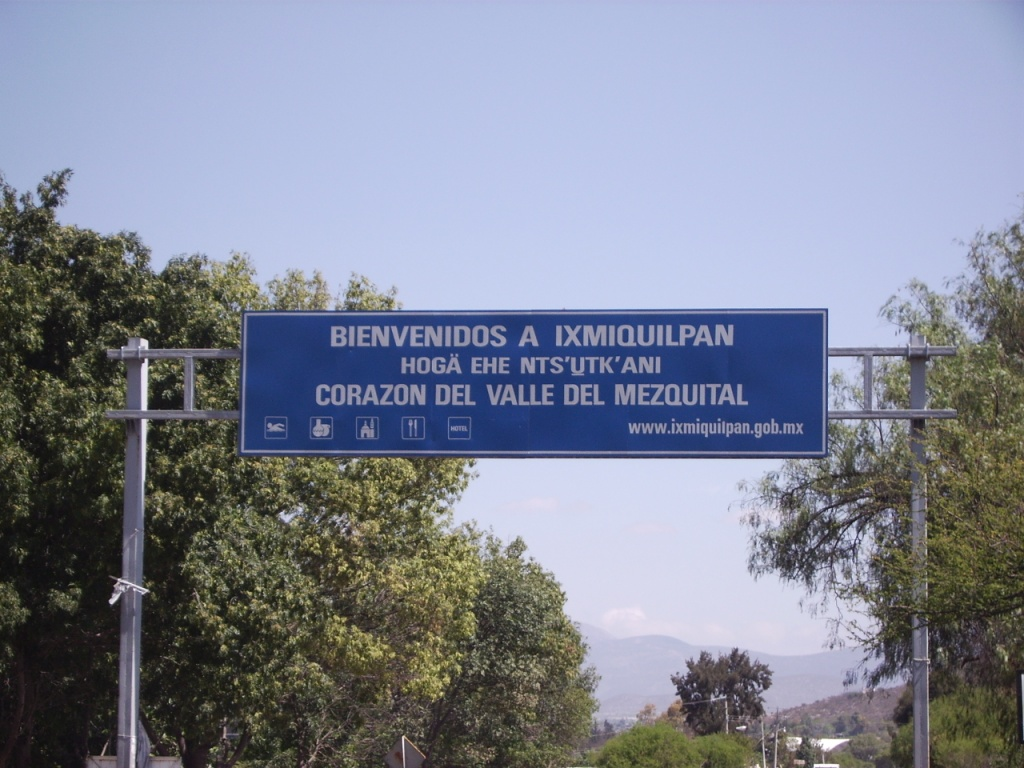
City entrance sign of Ixmiquilpan written in both Spanish and Otomi.

The first ethnic group to settle in the Mezquital Valley in Hidalgo state were a group of Otomies, who called themselves Hñahñus. They named this area Ntsʼu̱tkʼani, which means place of verdolagas or pigweed. They were well established here by the time the Toltecs arrived to establish the city of Tollan. These Otomies would be subjugated by the Toltecs then later by the Aztec Empire. Both these peoples spoke Nahuatl and renamed the area Itzmiquilpan (later spelled Ixmiquilpan), which means "place where the verdolagas cut like flint knives." Under the Aztecs, these Otomies were not just tributary people but also provided soldiers as allies in the Aztecs' many wars. This gave them a certain amount of autonomy within the Aztec Empire. This notion of autonomy would continue into the Colonial period when communities such as Orizabita and San Juanico called themselves "republics."

After the Conquest, the first Spanish arrived here headed by Pedro Rodríguez de Escobar, who were sent by Pedro de Alvarado as scouts. The Augustinian monks who accompanied these soldiers founded the town of Ixmiquilpan, with the founding of the church and monastery of San Miguel Arcángel in 1550. The town grew over time, and by the early 17th century, it was decided to build the first bridge over the Tula River, to connect Ixmiquilpan with the newer settlement of Barrio de la Otra Banda, today Barrio de Progreso. The project was undertaken by Captain Miguel Cuevas y Dávales and inaugurated in 1655.

Another important church, the Chapel of Nuestra Señora del Carmen was built by Patricio Joseph Tovar. It was built in what was called the Tlazintla neighborhood, now called Del Carmen. Construction of the church began in 1752 and completed in 1772.

In 1779, Diego Alarcón de Ocaña was named mayor of the town, who introduced a potable water system, among a number of other projects of social benefit. For this reason, one of the main roads is named after here, and there was a statue of him on the main plaza. This statue was destroyed by an earthquake.

During the Mexican War of Independence, insurgent forces under Ignacio López Rayón made camp here and also defeated royalist forces in the nearby village of Tamaleras, now called López Rayón. In 1854, a local uprising, especially in the communities of Orizabita and Remedios was caused by excessive taxes which Ixmiquilpan authorities levied. These were led by Sotero Lozano, who was called a bandit. This leader was most active in the towns of Actopan and Cardonal, his hometown.

Another bridge over the Tula River was constructed in 1912 in the Barrio Del Maye.

President Venustiano Carranza came to Ixmiquilpan in 1918 to inaugurate the rail line between Pachuca and here, along with the Nith train station. The rail line through here was planned by Englishman Richard Honey, who came to Ixmiquilpan with his family to settle. The rail line was supposed to run from Pachuca to Tampico, Tamaulipas but it was built only as far as this town. However, Honey did manage to build the "Iron Bridge" over the Tula River in the town of Tasquillo which became part of the Camino Real as well.

While here, he also signed a convention to construct a canal now called Debodhe to divert water from the Tula River for agricultural purposes. General Alvaro Obregon also came here while campaigning for a second term as president of Mexico. During the presidency of Lázaro Cárdenas, who also visited Ixmiquilpan on several occasions, the Tecolote Dam as well as the El Morelos and El Moros Canals were built, to replace the old Debodhe canal. Later the Capula Dam would be built as well as a canal that brought drainage waters from the Valley of Mexico, which was also used for irrigation purposes. At the end of the 1930s the irrigation capacity of the valley was expanded again with the Maye Dam and the Felipe Angels Dam.

In the 1940s the Mexico City/Laredo highway was built through Ixmiquilpan which gave the town more connection with the outside world. A short time later the municipal market was inaugurated in 1942 to meet the needs of the growing community. This market was originally on the main plaza but was moved to the Jose Maria Morelos neighborhood in 1969.

In 1951, by presidential decree, the Patrimonio Indígena del Valle de Mezquital (Valley of Mezquital Indigenous Heritage) was created in Ixmiquilpan by President Miguel Alemán Valez and state governor D. Quintín Rueda Villagran. The primary function of this organization is to promote the economy and the education of the Otomies of this region. One of its first projects was to build the Justo Sierra Secondary School in the town. Prior to this school's construction, youths had to travel to Pachuca or even to Mexico City for a secondary education.

By 1969, many urbanization projects, such as the municipal market, paved streets and streetlights had been accomplished. Another project from this time was the remodeling of the main plaza and the installation of the Diana, the Huntress fountain in the center of the plaza. From the 1940s to the 1960s the town of Ixmiquilpan improved its infrastructure considerably with the installation of the public health clinic, expansion of the main park, a sports center, a municipal library, the remodeling of the Hidalgo Theatre, the establishment of the Ñañhu or Otomi Cultural Museum and installation of radio and television broadcast. Not only did this improved the socioeconomic status of those living here, the population quintupled.

== Geography ==
Ixmiquilpan is located on the Mexico City/Nuevo Laredo Highway at km 170 in the central west part of the state of Hidalgo.

=== Climate ===
Climate data for Ixmiquilpan
Month	Jan	Feb	Mar	Apr	May	Jun	Jul	Aug	Sep	Oct	Nov	Dec	Year
Record high °C (°F)	30.0 (86.0)	33.5 (92.3)	38.0 (100.4)	38.0 (100.4)	39.5 (103.1)	37.0 (98.6)	35.0 (95.0)	33.0 (91.4)	33.0 (91.4)	35.5 (95.9)	32.5 (90.5)	30.5 (86.9)	39.5 (103.1)
Mean daily maximum °C (°F)	24.1 (75.4)	26.0 (78.8)	28.9 (84.0)	30.3 (86.5)	30.7 (87.3)	28.6 (83.5)	27.3 (81.1)	27.5 (81.5)	26.4 (79.5)	25.6 (78.1)	25.0 (77.0)	23.8 (74.8)	27.0 (80.6)
Daily mean °C (°F)	13.6 (56.5)	15.0 (59.0)	17.7 (63.9)	19.8 (67.6)	21.3 (70.3)	20.8 (69.4)	19.9 (67.8)	19.8 (67.6)	19.2 (66.6)	17.4 (63.3)	15.5 (59.9)	14.2 (57.6)	17.9 (64.2)
Mean daily minimum °C (°F)	3.1 (37.6)	4.1 (39.4)	6.6 (43.9)	9.3 (48.7)	11.8 (53.2)	13.0 (55.4)	12.5 (54.5)	12.2 (54.0)	11.9 (53.4)	9.2 (48.6)	6.1 (43.0)	4.6 (40.3)	8.7 (47.7)
Record low °C (°F)	−5.0 (23.0)	−6.0 (21.2)	−4.0 (24.8)	0.0 (32.0)	2.0 (35.6)	3.0 (37.4)	5.0 (41.0)	5.0 (41.0)	1.0 (33.8)	−2.0 (28.4)	−4.0 (24.8)	−5.0 (23.0)	−6.0 (21.2)
Average precipitation mm (inches)	8.0 (0.31)	6.5 (0.26)	9.8 (0.39)	21.1 (0.83)	40.7 (1.60)	56.0 (2.20)	48.1 (1.89)	35.2 (1.39)	59.9 (2.36)	27.8 (1.09)	7.1 (0.28)	6.6 (0.26)	326.8 (12.87)
Average precipitation days (≥ 0.1 mm)	1.9	1.7	2.7	4.8	6.2	8.0	7.7	6.7	8.5	5.7	2.4	1.7	58.0
Source: Servicio Meteorologico Nacional

== The town ==
It is considered the heart of the Mezquital Valley of Mexico. Located 158 km. from Mexico City by Mexican Federal Highway 85, it was an important commercial strategic spot even before the Spanish conquest. Its population is mainly Otomi, regionally called Ñhañhu. According to town chronicler José Antonio Ramírez Guerrero, Ixmiquilpan has taken steps to participate in the Pueblos Mágicos programs, which are sponsored by the Mexican government's Tourism Secretary. The town qualifies for its history, surrounding landscapes and the Otomí culture that is strongly present here. However, a number of improvements are still needed in the town's infrastructure, especially in the way of sanitation and services for tourists.

=== Church of San Miguel Archangel ===
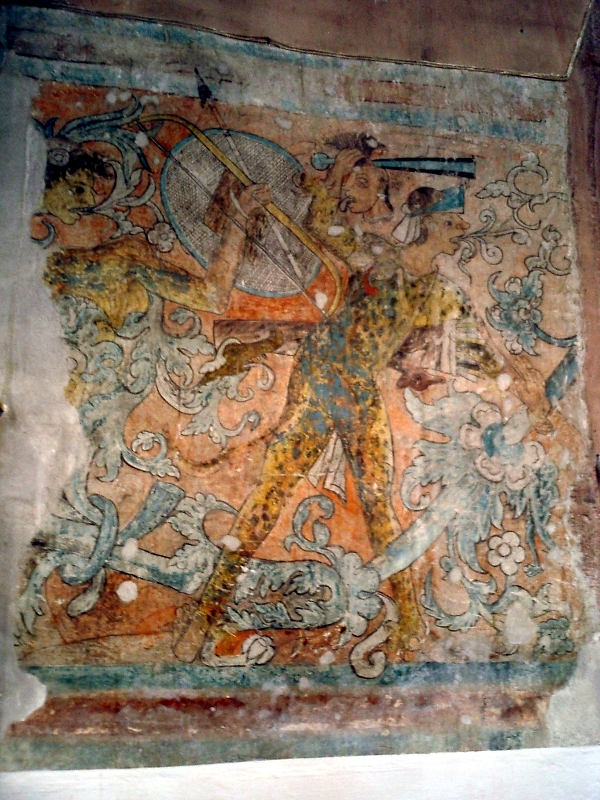
Mural in the entrance area

After the arrival of Augustinian monks shortly after the Spanish Conquest of Mexico, this church and its now former monastery were built by Fray Andrés de la Mata de Barrios in 1550. The church is dedicated to the Archangel Michael and was built using Indian labor pressed into service by the monks. This church is typical of the fortress-style churches built by the Augustinians in the 16th century. The facade is Plateresque style with paired columns and with a window in the choir area. The bell tower is annexed and joined with the facade. It has a crown and bell gables.

However, what makes the church fairly unusual are its murals with overt pre-Hispanic themes. Imagery that is repeated here is that of holy war, with Eagle and Jaguar warriors as well as images associated with the sun and moon gods. The Jaguar and Eagle warriors were some of the armies that the Spanish fought during the Conquest, who wore resplendent apparel. Few explicit pictorial references to these warriors were permitted afterwards. The murals at Ixmiquilpan are an exception. The murals here appear in series of polychrome frescos, which have structure in a large and coherent way. Traditional monastic murals of that time were monochromatic and devoted to Biblical subjects. Some of these more traditional murals can be seen in the church's sacristy.

The significance of the murals have been debated, especially since they are found so prominently in a Christian church of early in the colonial period. Mostly likely these images were at least partially reinterpreted with Christian themes. Many combine indigenous images with themes from the European Renaissance. The father sun figure in Otomí mythology, Zidada Hyadi (Venerable Sun) was identified with Jesus (Zidada Hesu) and the moon goddess (Zinänä) with the Virgin Mary As for the war images, The 1570s here were characterized by near-constant battles with the nomadic Chichimecas, which was finally ended with a decisive battle won by the Otomis. That battle was also views as a triumph of Christianity over paganism.

Upon entering the church, one can see underneath the choir, fragments of murals showing Eagle and Jaguar warriors dialoguing, indicated by Aztec speech scrolls. Inside the nave is a large sequence of battle murals in enormous friezes that extend from under the choir long both sides. On the south wall, Eagle, Jaguar and Coyote warriors are dressed in animal skins, robes and feathered helmets, all fighting one another with obsidian swords and other weapons. The scenes depict decapitations and the dragging of prisoners against a landscape rich in foliage. Along the north wall, these warriors battle supernatural creatures such as a centaur which wears a headdress of quetzal feathers and figures of pregnant women emerging from acanthus buds. This church was declared a national monument in 1933.

=== The Diana fountain ===
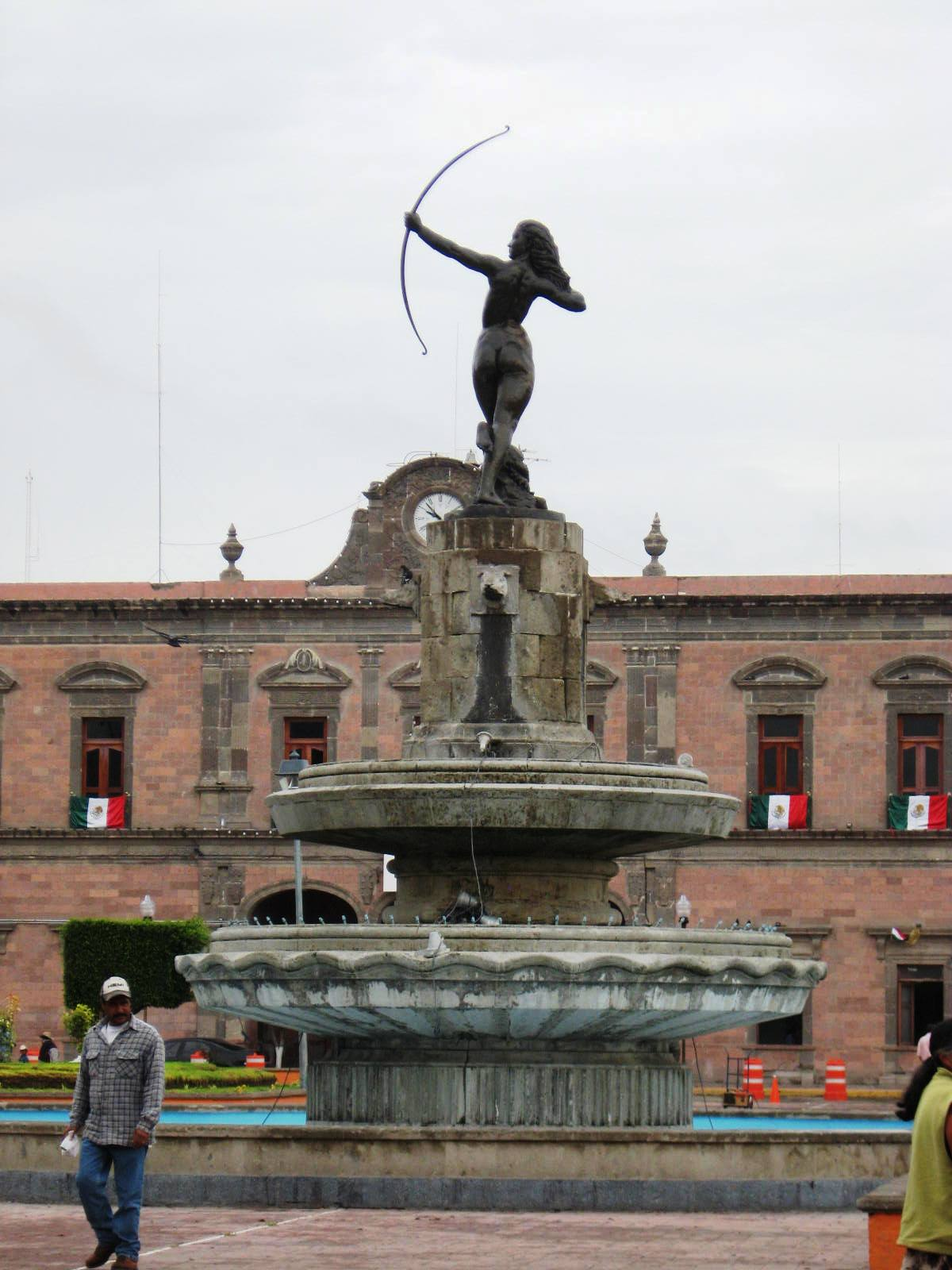
Close up of the Diana, the Huntress statue

In the center of the main plaza is a fountain, which contains a sculpture of Diana, the Huntress. This sculpture was the original Diana that was created by Olaguibel in 1942 and placed on Paseo de la Reforma in Mexico City. In 1944, a group known as the "League of Decency" headed by Soledad Orozco de Avila Camacho, wife of president Manuel Ávila Camacho, decided that the Diana statue was indecent due to the fact that it was nude. It was removed from Reforma and put in Chapultepec Park before it came to Ixmiquilpan and was placed in the fountain there in 1970. The Diana statue that is currently in Mexico City is a second version cast by Olaguibel and placed in the same place in Mexico City.

=== Other sites of interest ===
The Bridge of San Miguel or La Otra Banda was the first built here in the 17th century. It was built of stone with large arches, and on each side of the river there are Moctezuma cypress trees marking the entrances. There used to be stone plaques that recorded the history of the bridges construction, and above one of them a statue of the Archangel Michael subduing the devil with his sword, but these have disappeared recently. It is part of a road that used to be called El Camino Real de Ixmiquilpan and is now known as Progreso Street. It was the Camino Real because it was the principle road connecting the towns of Tasquillo, Zimapan, Alfajayucan and Ixmiquilpan with the Bajio territory to the west. Until the construction of the Mexico City/Laredo highway, this was the major road of the area. Aside from the San Miguel Church, the Chapel of Nuestra Señora del Carmen is one of the most important churches here. It has a pink stone facade, and inside there are tall wood altarpieces and large oil paintings. Its small atrium used to have a large number of cypress trees but these were cut down recently.

The Municipal Palace and the Hidalgo Theater next to it were built at the initiative of Mayor Marín Yánez, between 1906 and 1910 in preparation for the Centennial of Mexico's Independence. A local story states that when the Palace was inaugurated, a small pot filled with gold coins was interred in one of the portals. In 1949, during the first remodeling of the building, this pot was found but no one knows what happened to the coins.

The Universidad Tecnológica del Valle de Mezquital is sponsored by the state of Hidalgo and located in a number of communities and based in Ixmiquilpan. Its mission is to provide technical and economically important skills to the people of the state as well as promote university-level studies in many areas.

=== Festivals ===
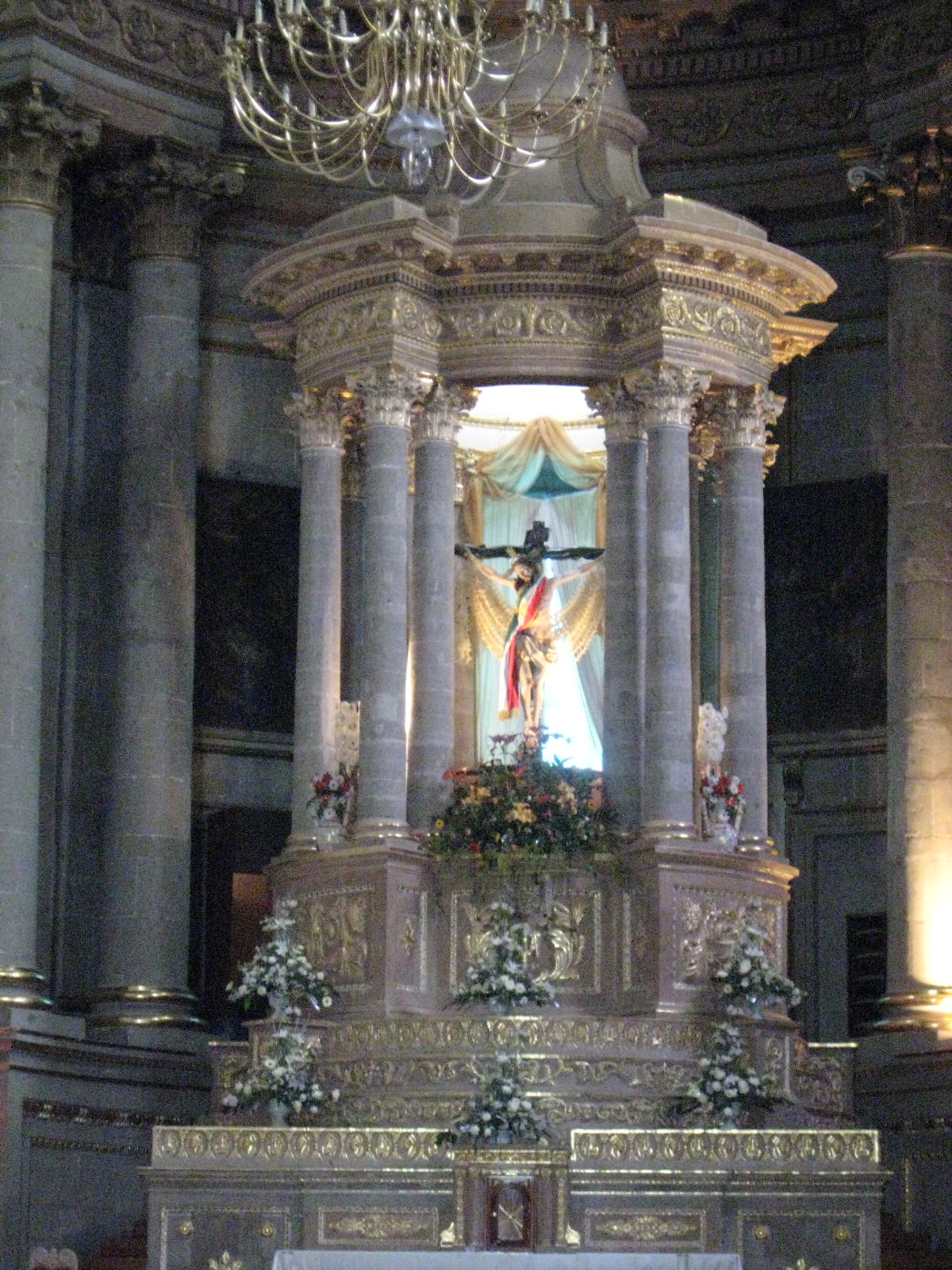
The main altar in the Church of the Archangel Michael

While Holy Week had always been an important, solemn commemoration in the Church of the Archangel Michael, in recent years, a re-enactment of Good Friday has been added, which is a procession from the Barrio of San Miguel to the church. Another important festival is that of the Holy Cross of Maye on the third of May. On this day descends the cross kept at the chapel on Deshitzo Mountain. This cross is the one that is brought up to the chapel on Deshitzo on 21 or 22 October in a procession that starts at the Maye Church and goes five km up the mountain to leave the cross and celebrate a Massachusetts

The Feast of the Santo Niño de Atocha is celebrated in Barrio Progreso the last Sunday in January. It is one of the most representative celebrations of the municipality and draws pilgrims from other parts of the state and elsewhere. The festival lasts two or three days, depending on the economy and includes amusement rides, traditional dances, sporting and cultural events.

The Lord of Jalpan (Señor de Jalpan) has two dates associated with him. The first is a festival that is held on 13 June, which draws bands devoted to wind instruments, and has become an important economic contributor in recent years. The other event is a procession that has been held on 7 September since 1946. This is a very traditional procession with candles, flower-adorned arches, dancers, songs and fireworks. The procession begins at about 8pm and wanders the streets of Ixmiquilpan until about 2 in the morning.

A secular parade particular to Ixmiquilpan takes place on 21 March. All the schools participate in the event creating floats and then marching around the town, dancing and playing instruments.

== The Municipality ==
The municipality of Ixmiquilpan consists of the town of Ixmiquilpan and 145 other recognized communities, which cover an area of 565.3 km². The largest communities outside of the seat are Panales, el Tephé, Maguey Blanco, Orizabita, el Alberto, Dios Padre, Julián Villagrán and Tatzadhó. The municipality borders with the municipalities of Zimapán, Nicolás Flores, Cardonal, Santiago de Anaya, San Salvador, Chilcuautla and Tasquillo. The total population of the municipality is 73,903, with 24,341, or almost a third speaking an indigenous language.

The climate and topography of the municipal divide into two parts. The land is beautiful and many take hiking trips for fun since the climate is almost perfect. This is increasing tourism in the area. Many buses departing from Mexico City arrive to this destination and visitors spend time in the so famous water parks throughout the community. One well known park is El Parque Acuatico De Dios Padre. This particular park offers transportation, hotels, camping and services for tourists that come from Mexico City. Many immigrants that migrated to the U.S. in the 1980s as the result in shortages of farm labor in California are from this particular area. Now in their late 20s, many have now obtained a higher education in the U.S. and are now returning to their homeland in Ixmiquilpan. This has let to new entrepreneurship in the area. Small businesses of tourism and hotels can now be found across the city. The southern portion is dry with green areas only where there is irrigation. It is relatively flat. The north in squarely in the Mezquital Valley and is considerably higher, wetter and more mountainous. A mountain ridge separates the two sections. The highest elevations are found at the La Palma, Thito, Muñeca, Guadril, Temboo, Dexitzo and Daxhie Mountains. These and other mountains have forests which contain pine, oak, walnut and a number of other trees. The dry areas contain vegetation such as mesquite, nopal, palms and other plants adapted to arid areas. Much of the agriculture in the municipality occurs in the relatively flat south which relies on irrigation due to the lack of rainfall. Main crops are corn, beans, animal feed and tomatoes. Livestock raised includes cattle, pigs, sheep, goats, turkeys and bees. There is some fishing in the north, where water is abundant, but it is mostly for auto-consumption. Almost a third of the population of the municipality still speaks an indigenous language, and this is almost exclusively Otomí. This is especially true in the smaller communities such as San Alberto, located in one of the lower portions of the Mezquital Valley off the highway between Ixmiquilpan and El Progreso, near the Tula River. It is a village of about 700 people, all of whom speak Otomi and a number speak little or no Spanish. They are farmers, living off the harvests of corn, beans and other staples. It is a poor town, with roads in disrepair and no streetlights. While the village has been converting this fresh water and hot springs here into bathing pools to attract tourism, many of their young people go to the United States to work and send back money.

The cuisine of this area is dependent on what is grown here. The pigweed which used to be the base of Ixmiquilpan's Otomi name, is eaten with nopales and in other mixtures. Edible insects such as butterfly larvae, honey ants, nopal beetles, escamoles, mesquite, nopal and corn worms are all used here in tacos, roasted, in omelets and other ways. The maguey flower, called gualumbo, is sautéed with epazote, onion and chile. Catfish and barbacoa are also staples here.

The municipality contains a number of water parks which take advantage of the streams and springs that are heated by the volcanic activity of the Trans-Mexican Volcanic Belt which runs through here. Many of these waters have a high mineral content and are claimed to have curative powers. Some of these water parks are Tephé, Te-Pathé, Dios Padre, Parque Ecoturistico EcoAlberto, Balneario Valle Paraíso, Pueblo Nuevo, Balneario Maguey Blanco, El Dauthi and Puerta de Oeste. There is also a natural reserve located to the north of the town on State Highway 27, which exuberant vegetation, waterfalls and rock formations, where camping and other outdoor activities are possible.

While the majority of the municipality's population (83%) are Catholic, other denominations have a definite presence, especially those called evangelicals. In the village of San Nicolás, there have been religious conflicts between traditional Catholics and evangelicals since 1991. In 2001, nine evangelical families were expelled from the town. Tensions rose again in 2006, when Catholics opposed the construction of an evangelical church in the area, and tried to tear down the building under construction. In the community of Cantinela, a number of Catholic religious images were found torched. Local and state authorities have had to intervene on a number of occasions.

== Photo gallery of the Parish of San Miguel Arcángel y Caritas Ixmiquilpan ==
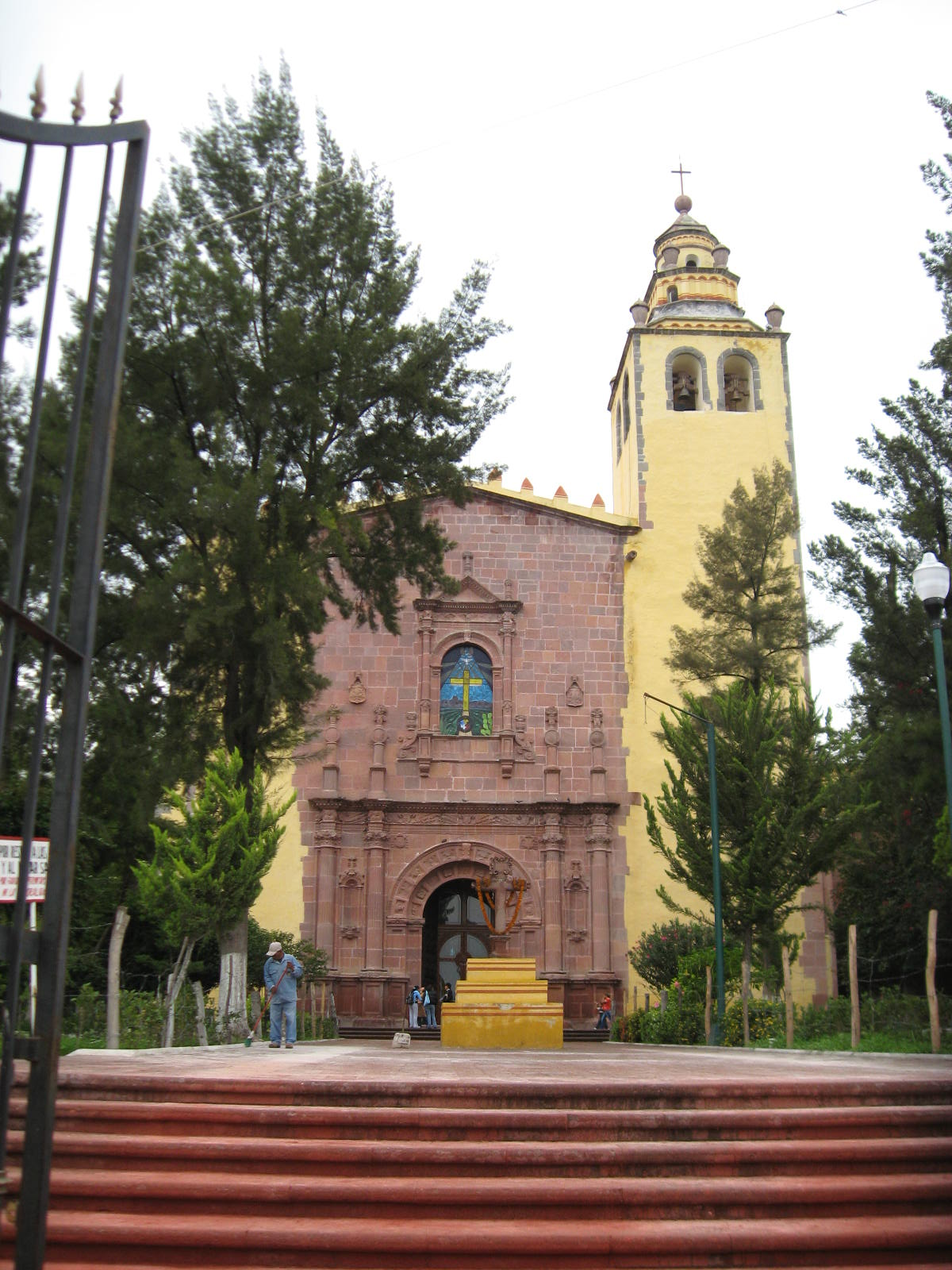
Front of the church

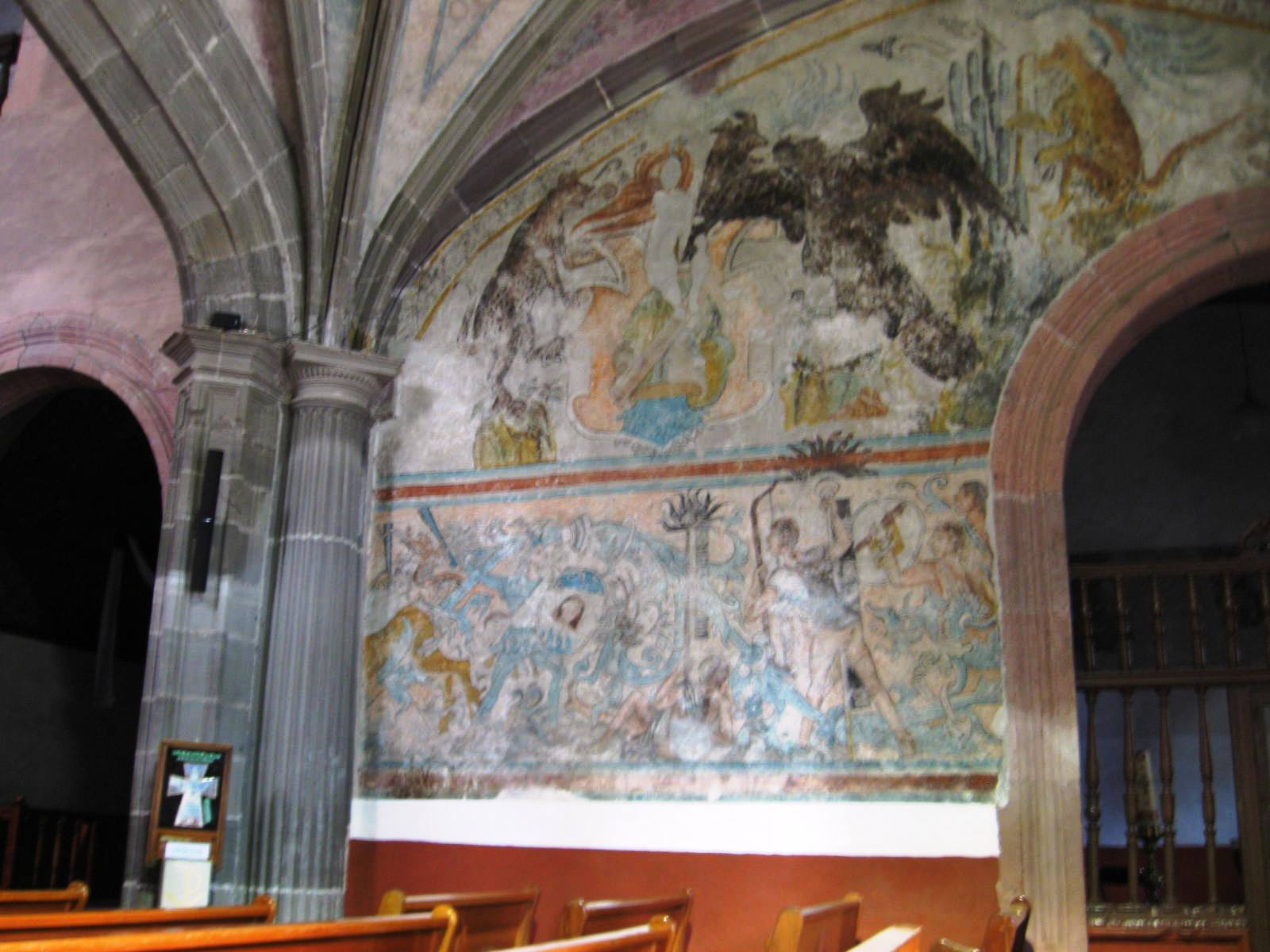
One of the murals inside the church

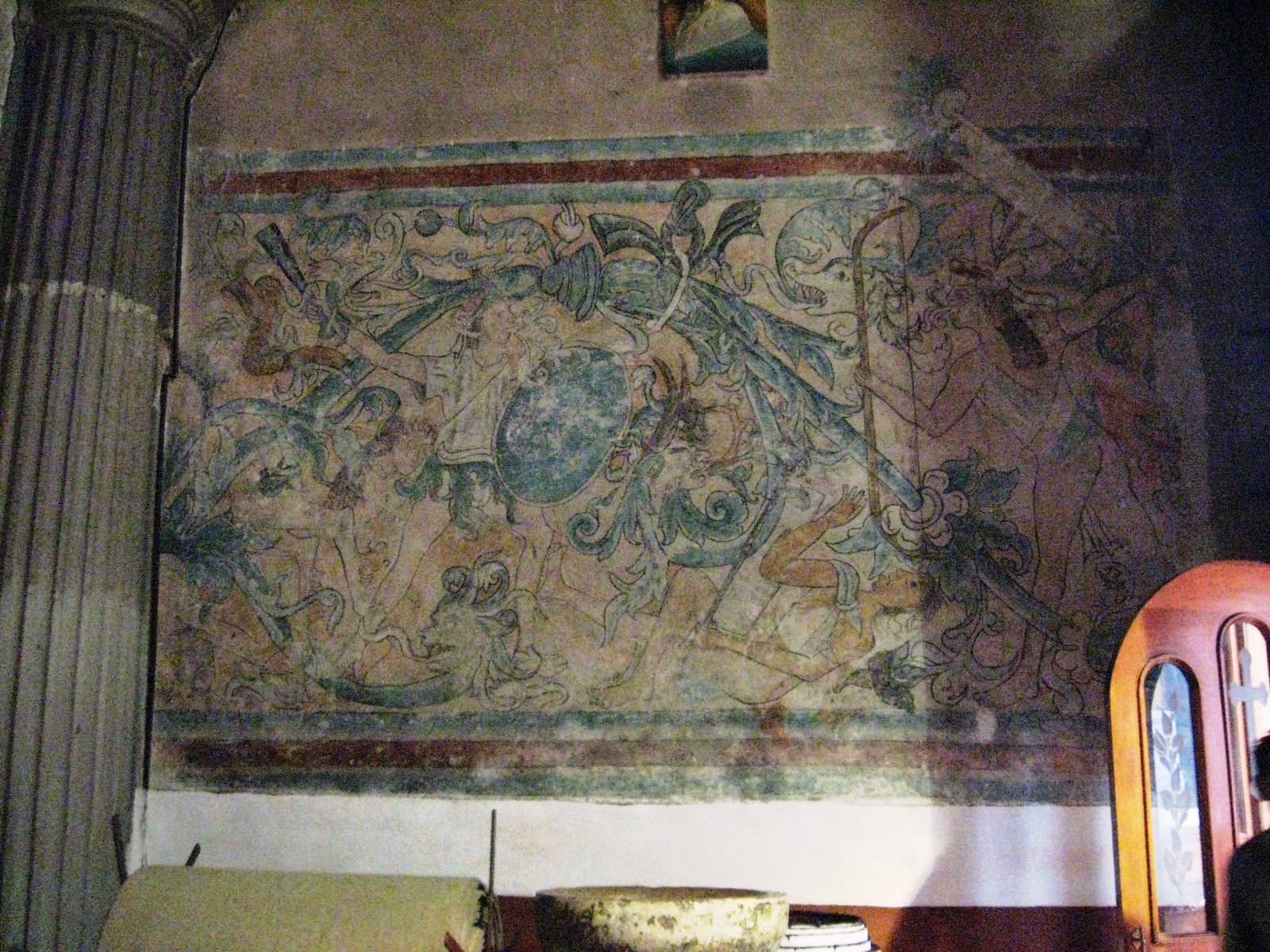
One of the murals inside the church

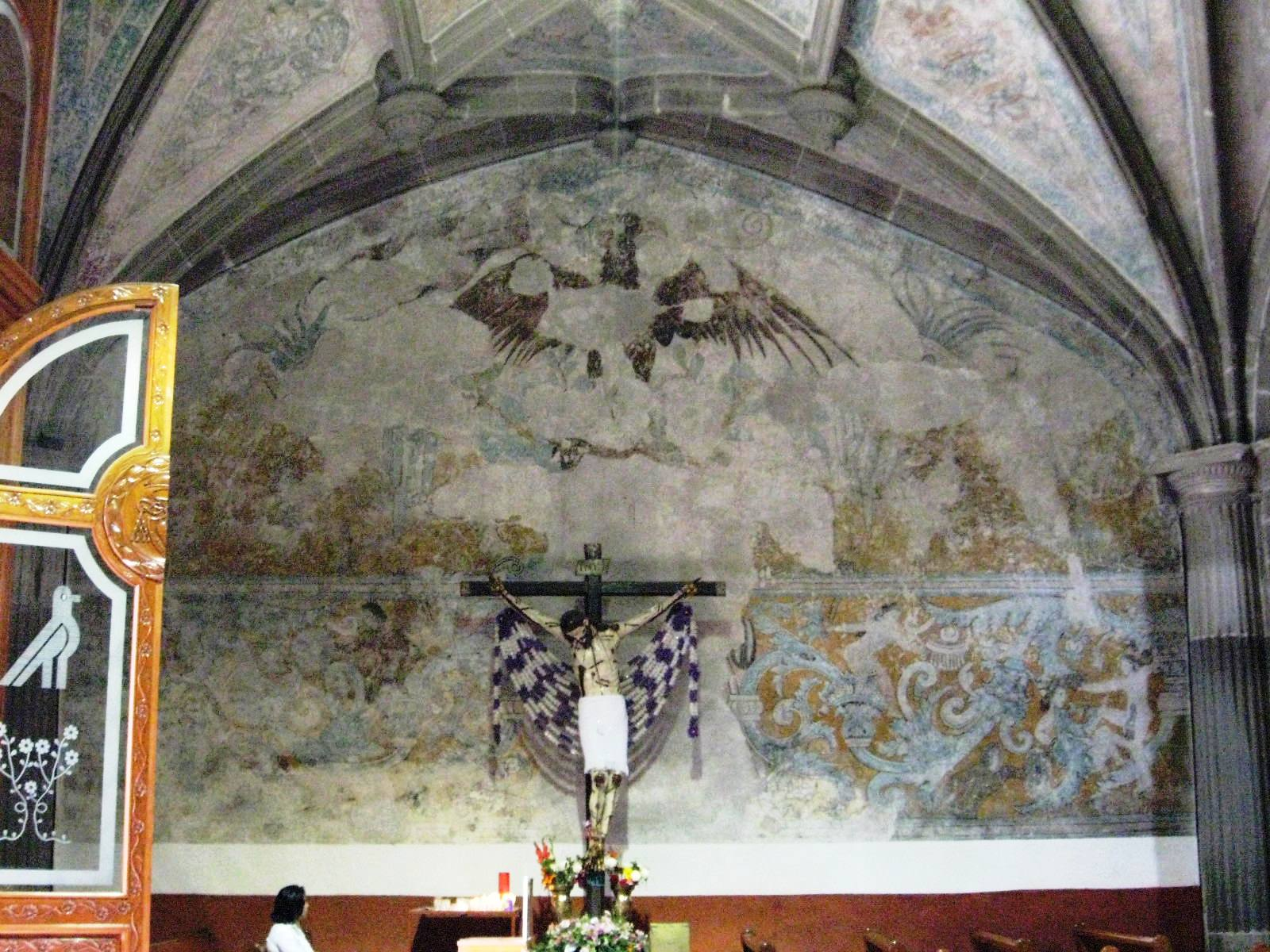
One of the murals inside the church

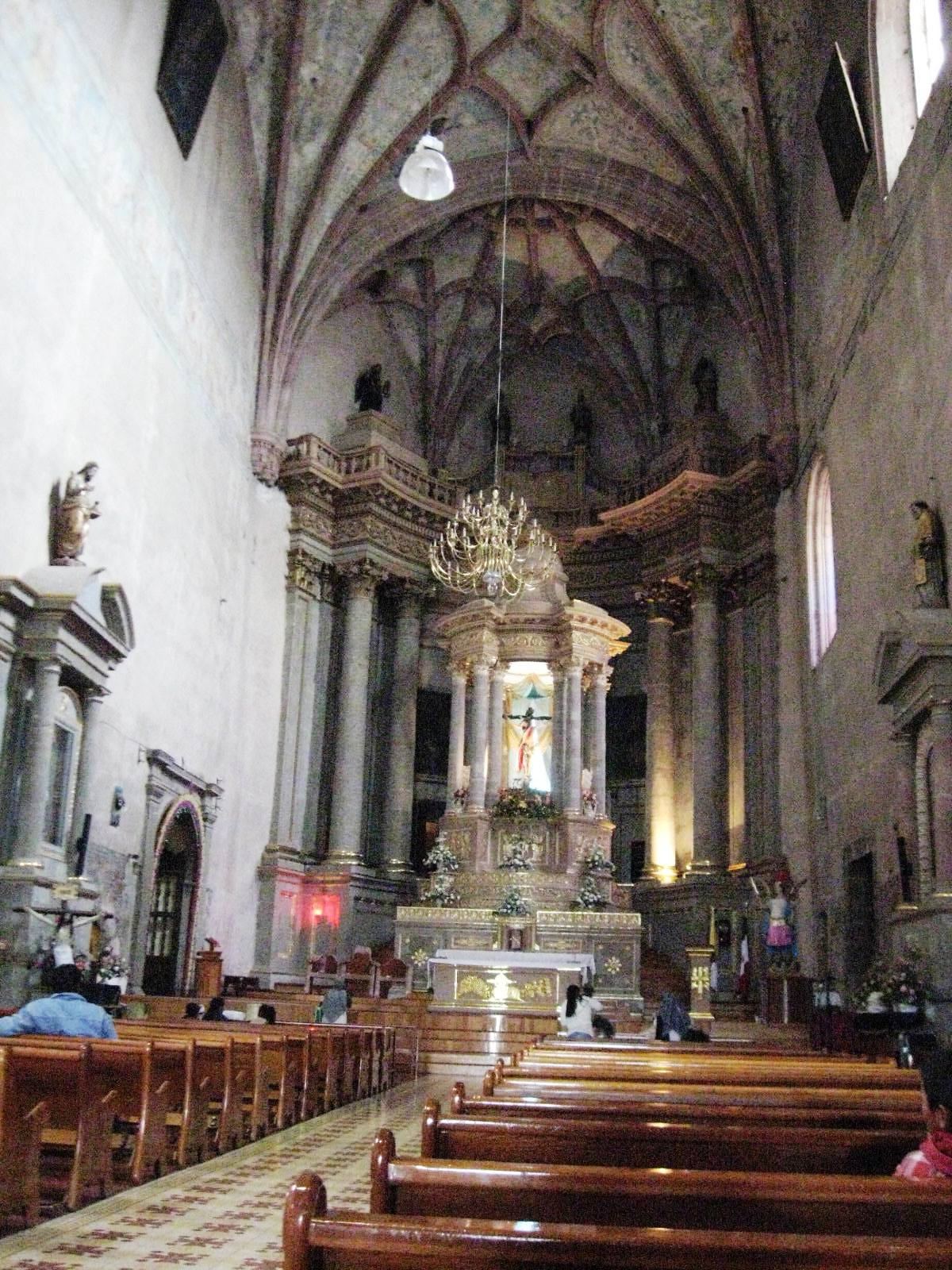
Looking towards the front of the Parish

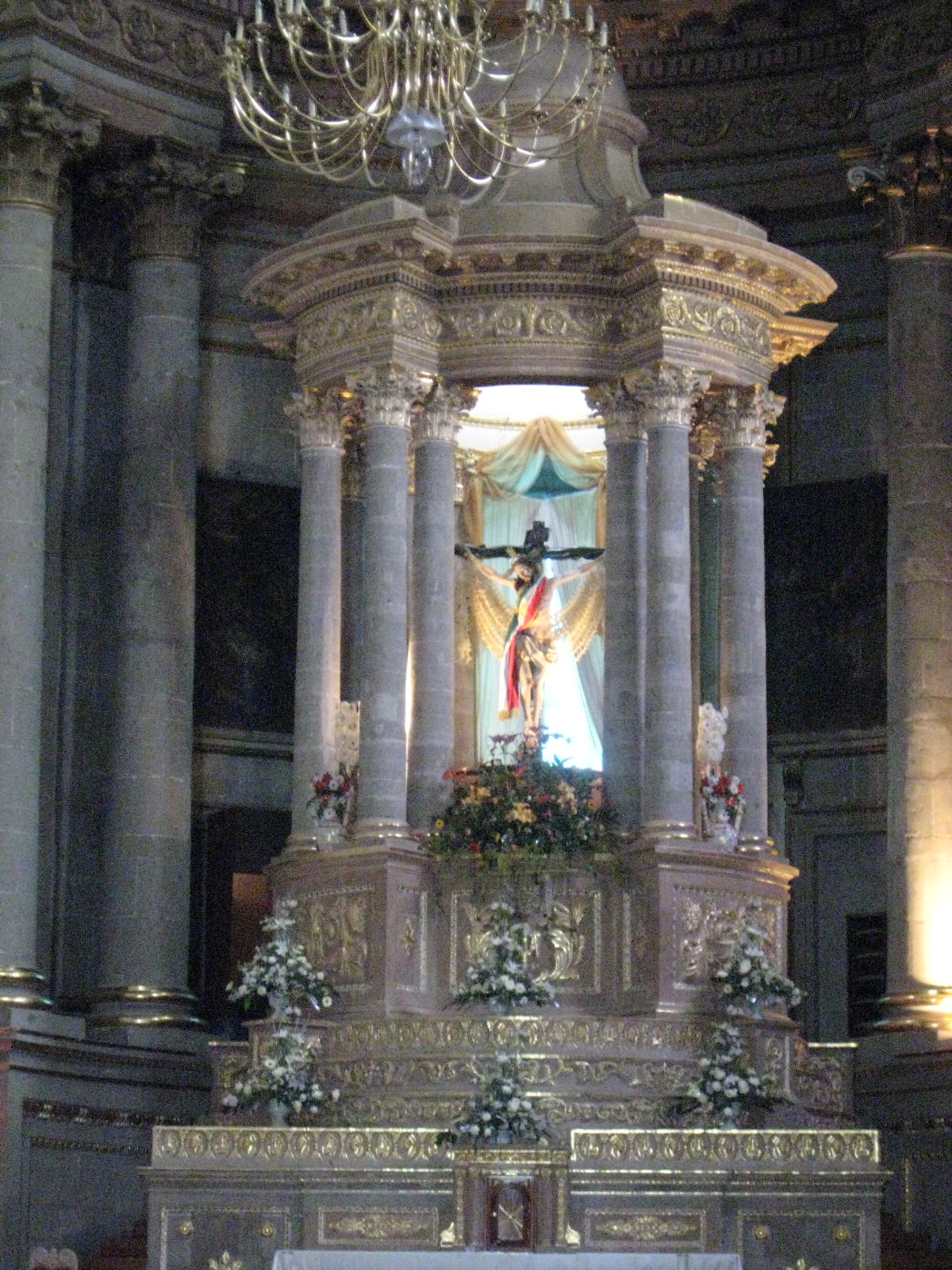
Close up of main altar

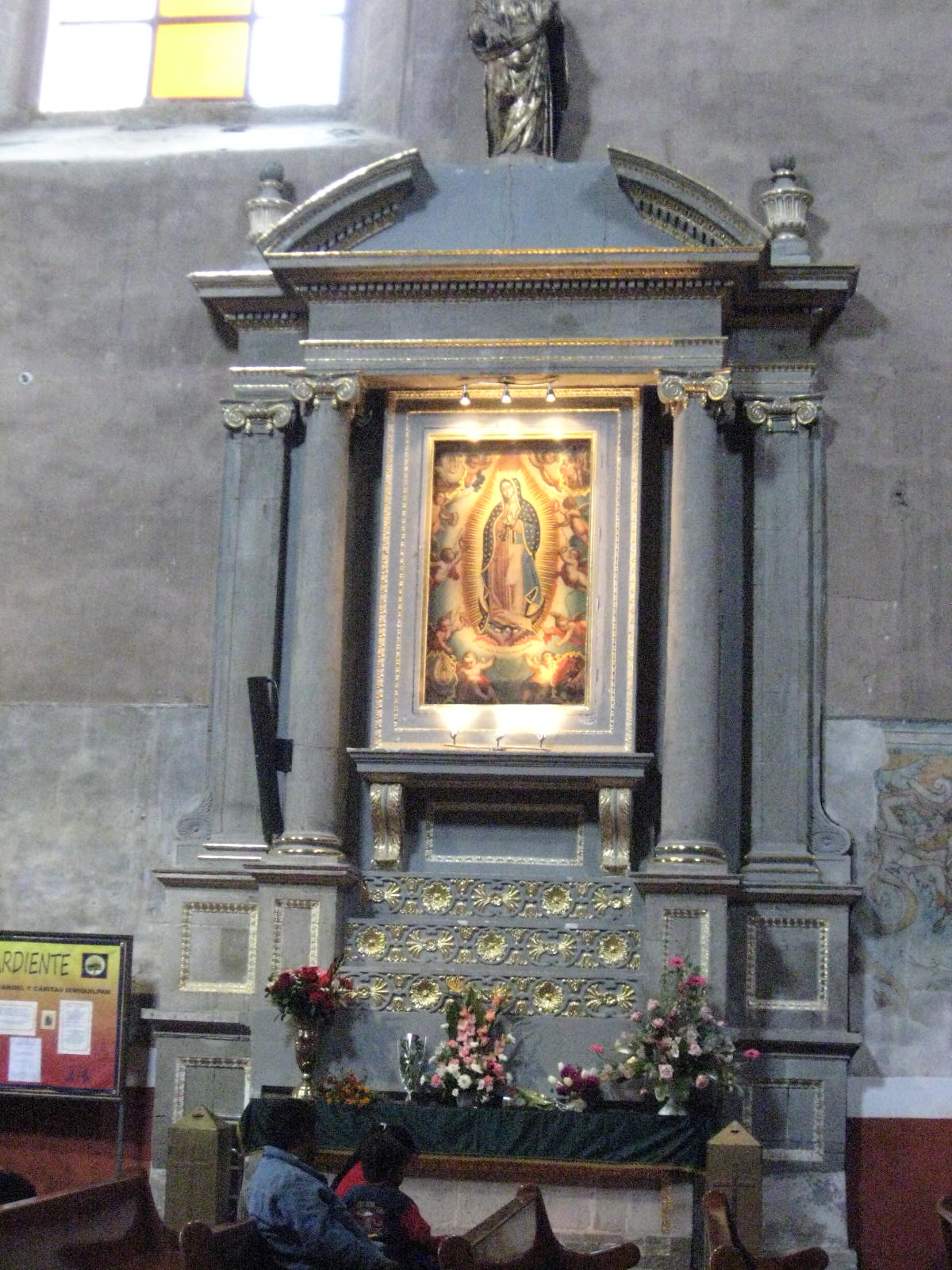
Shrine to the Virgin of Guadalupe

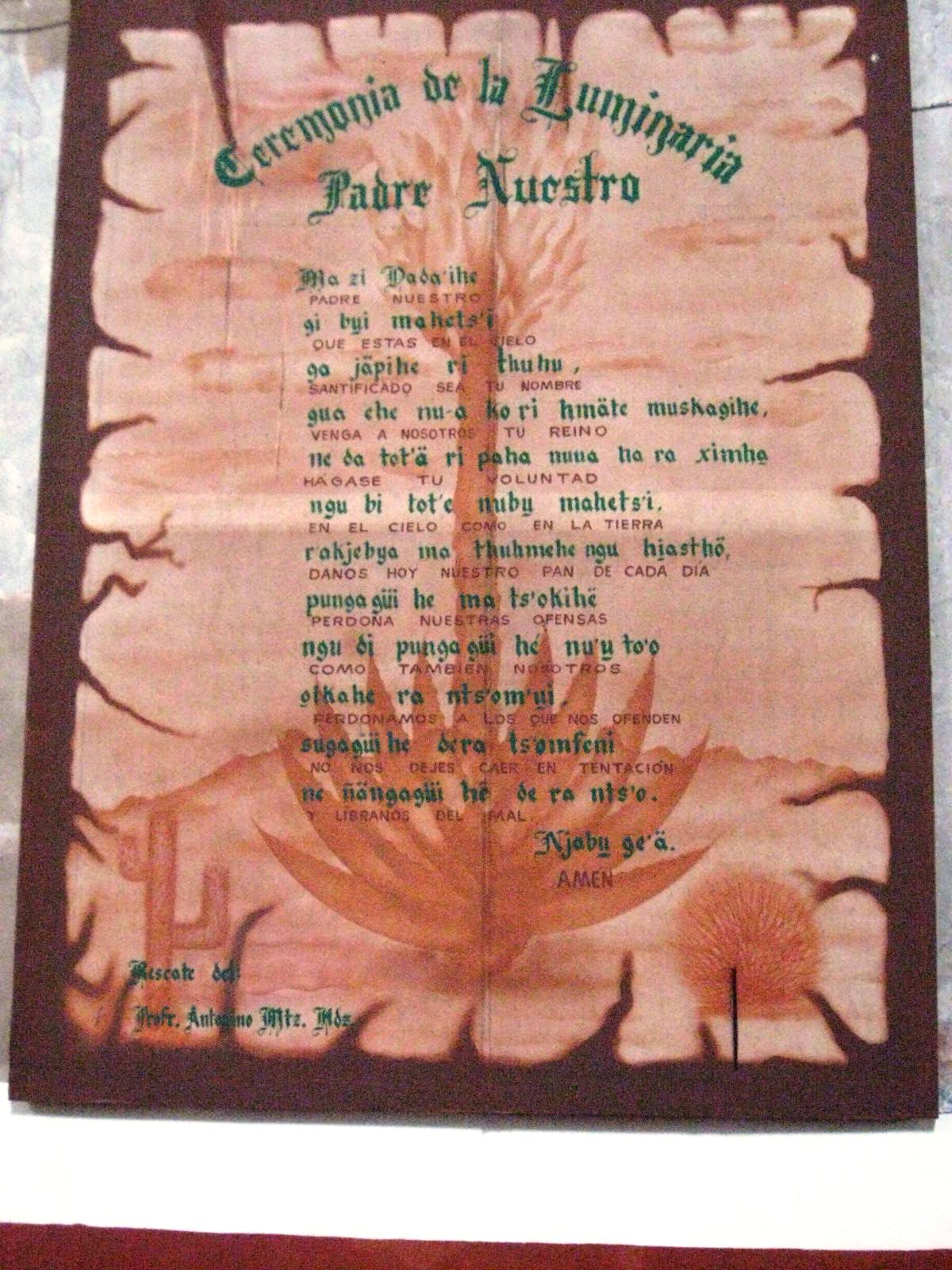
Lord's Prayer posted in Otomi and Spanish inside the Parish

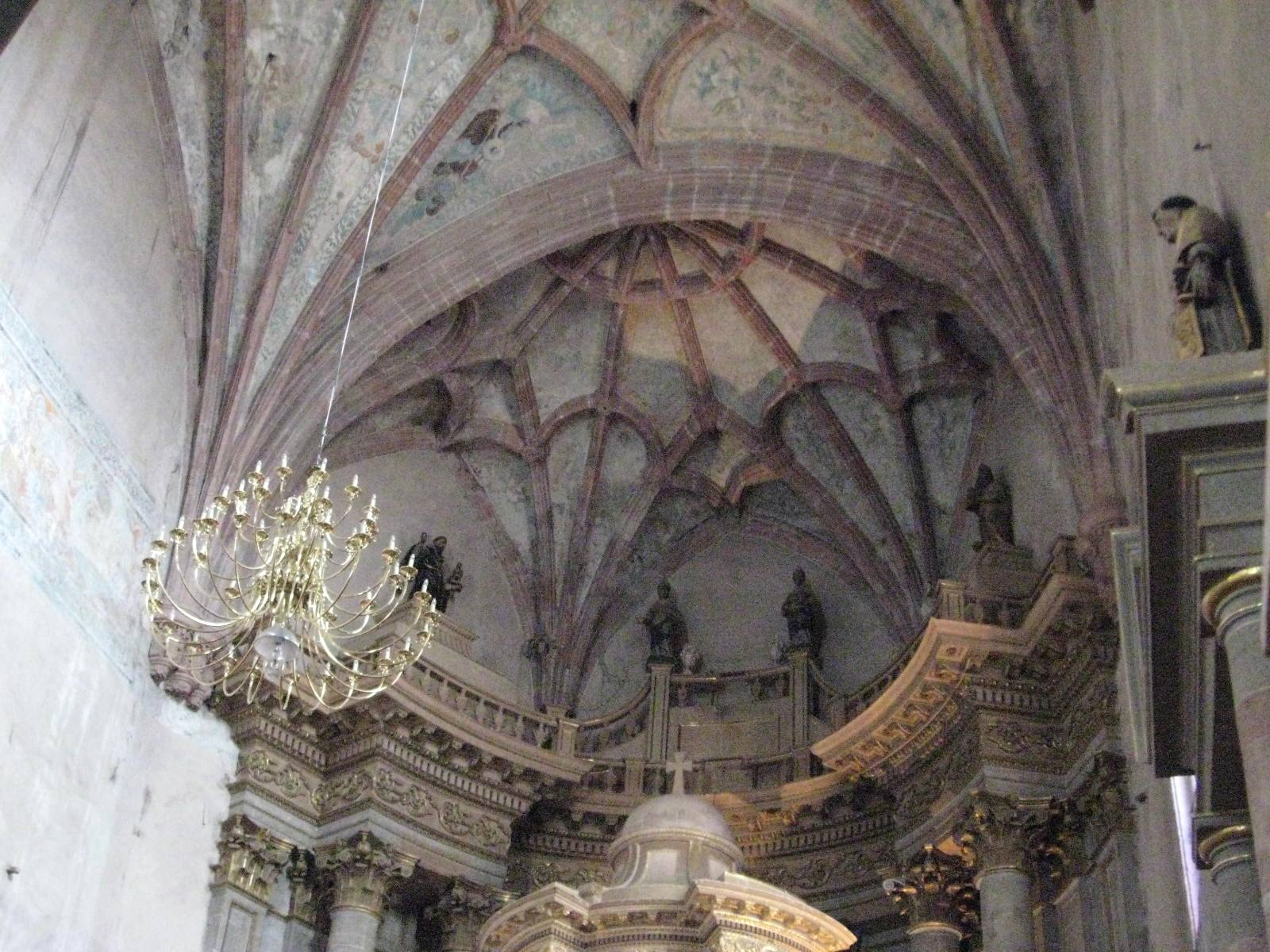
Above the altar

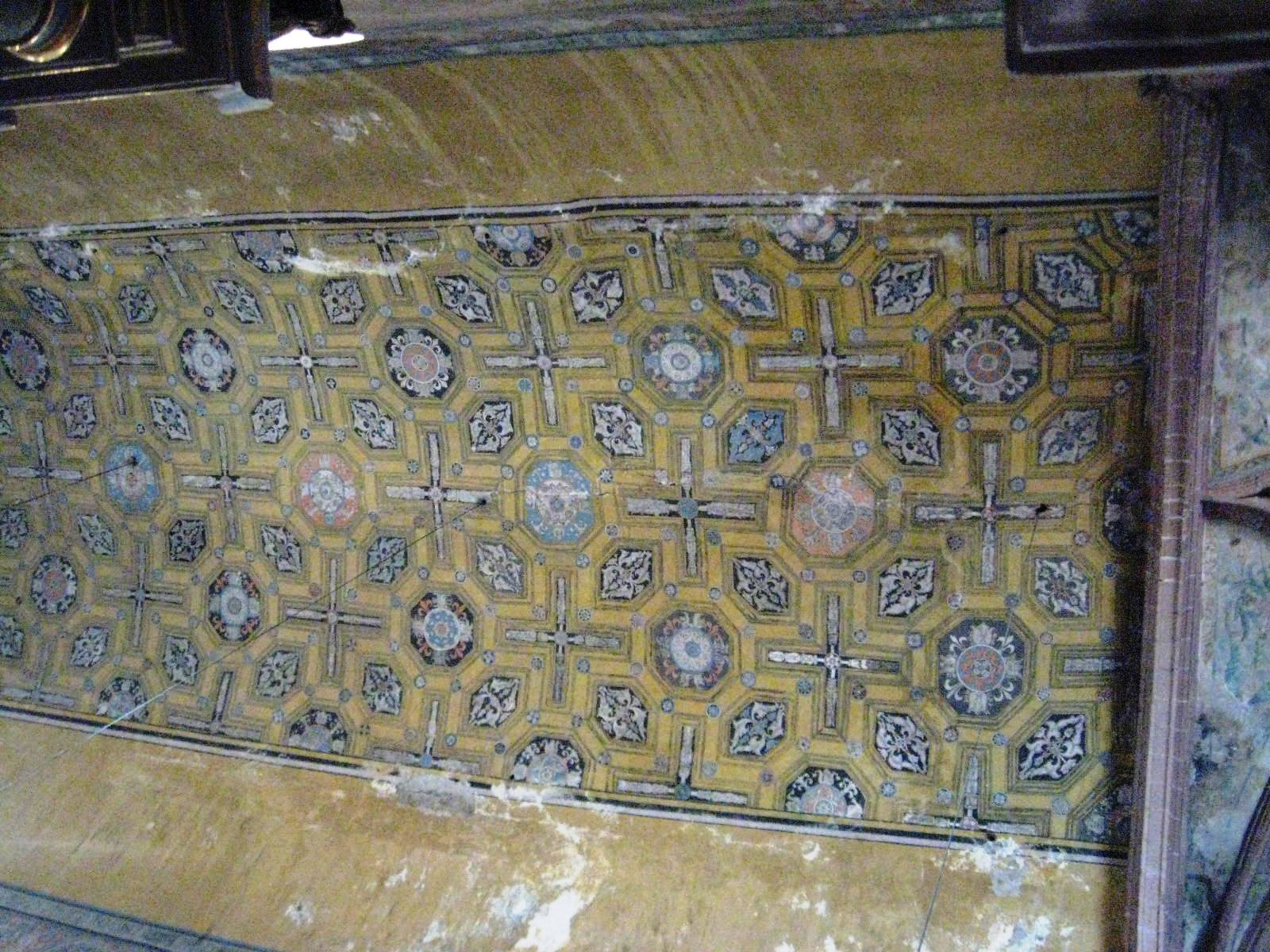
Decoration on ceiling of the church

== Photo gallery ==
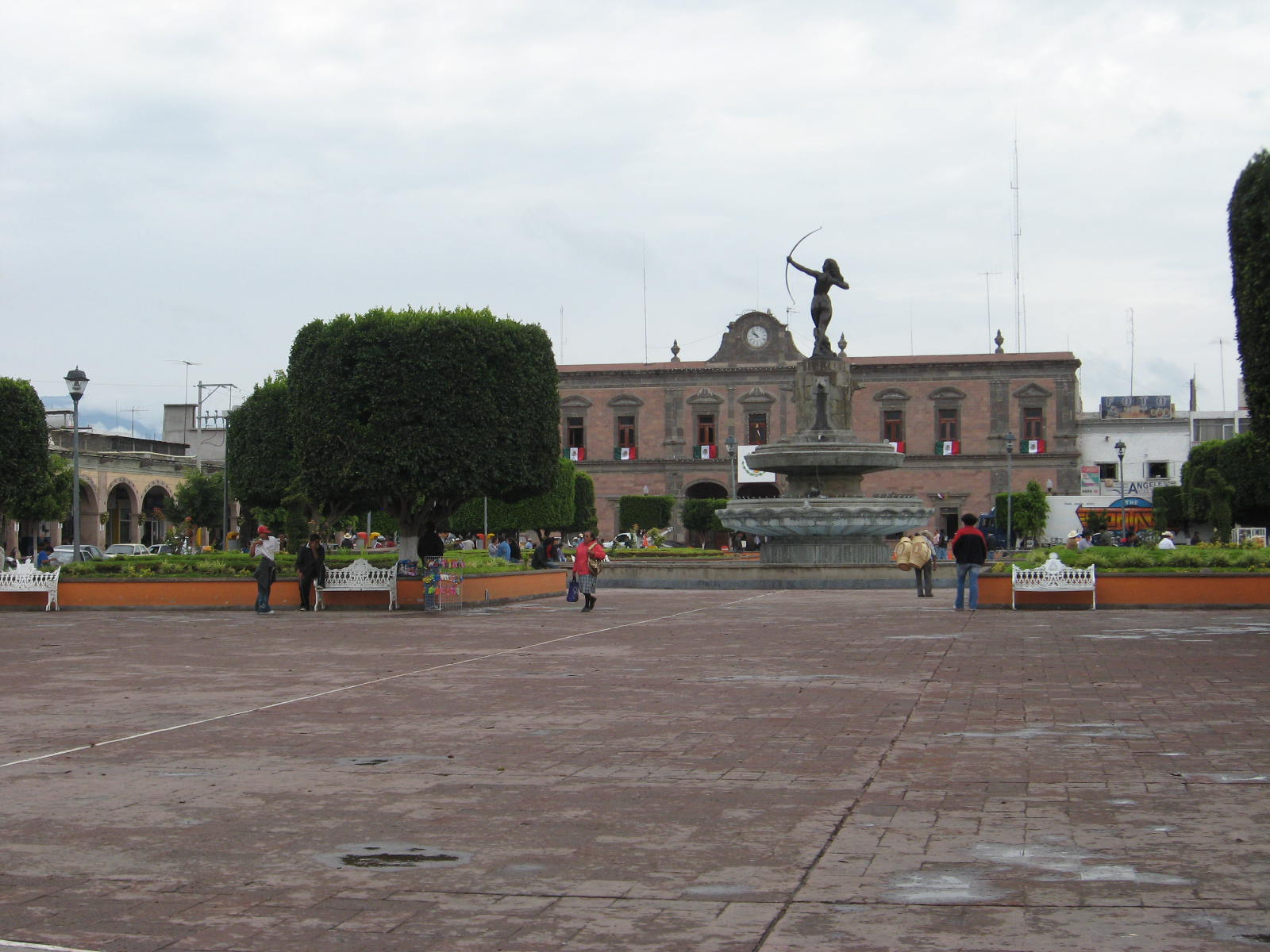
Main plaza or zocalo with statue of Diana

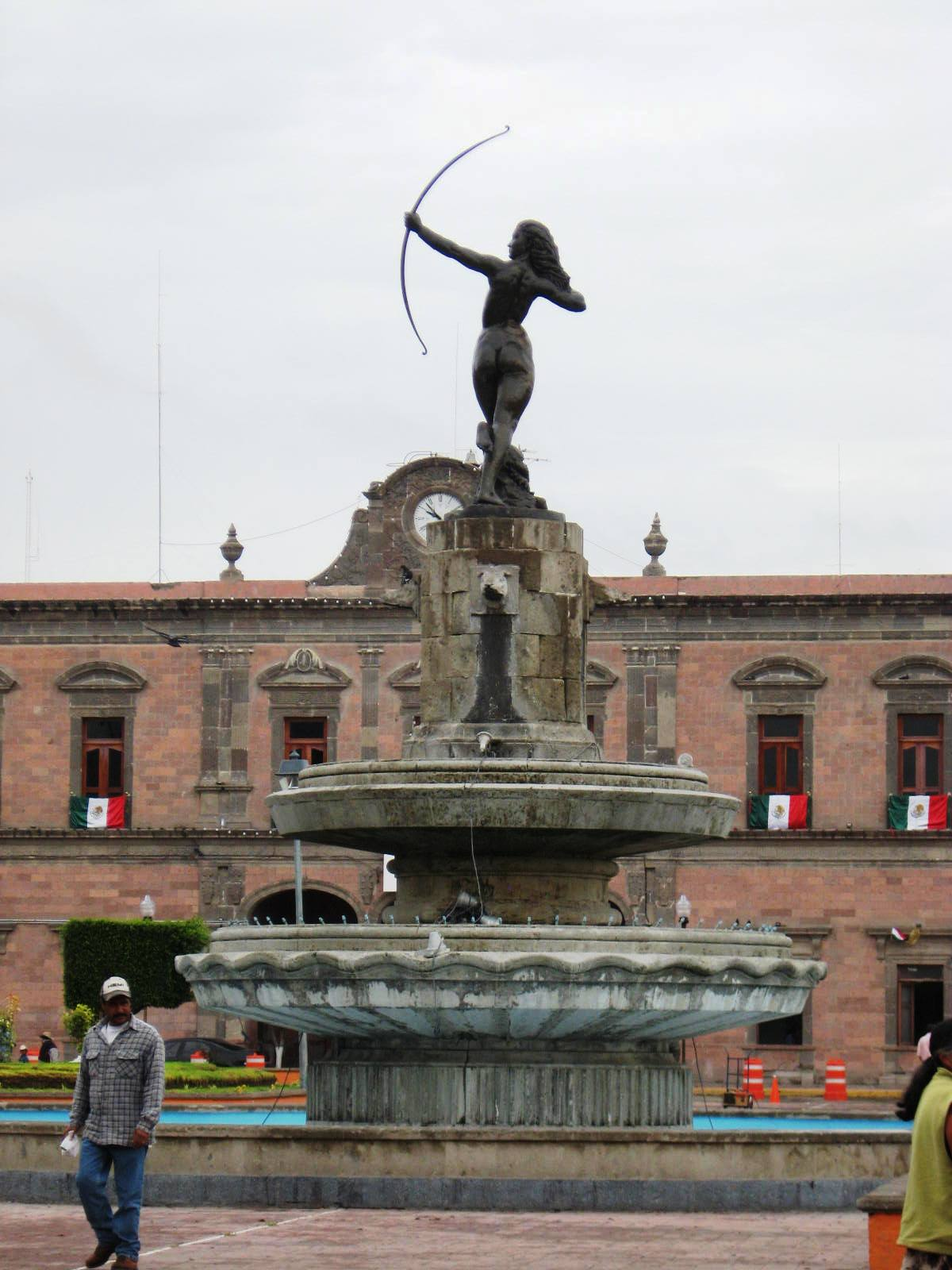
Close up of Diana statue and fountain

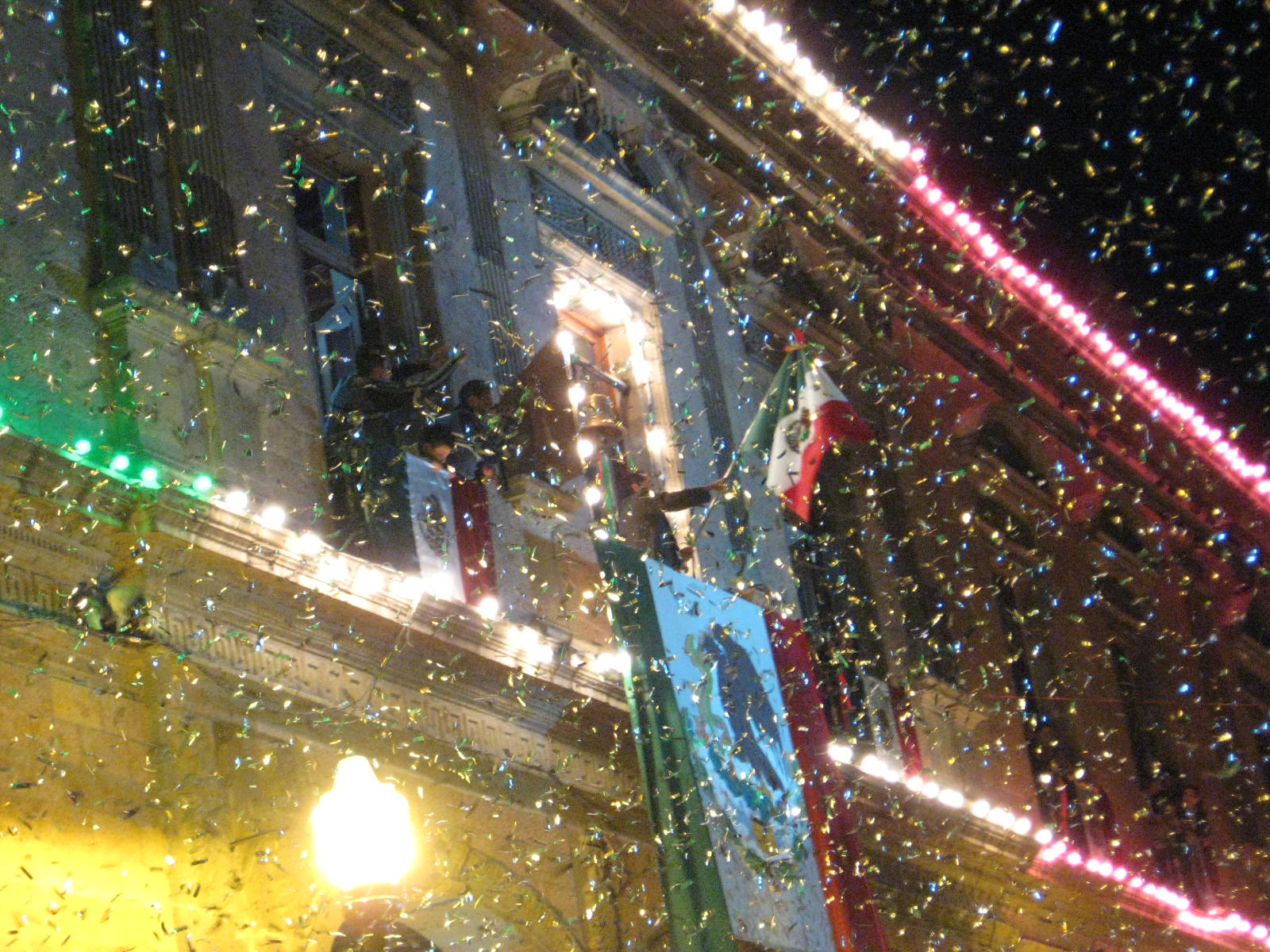
Municipal president giving the Grito de Dolores of "Viva Mexico" to commence Independence Day festivities on 15 Sept 2008

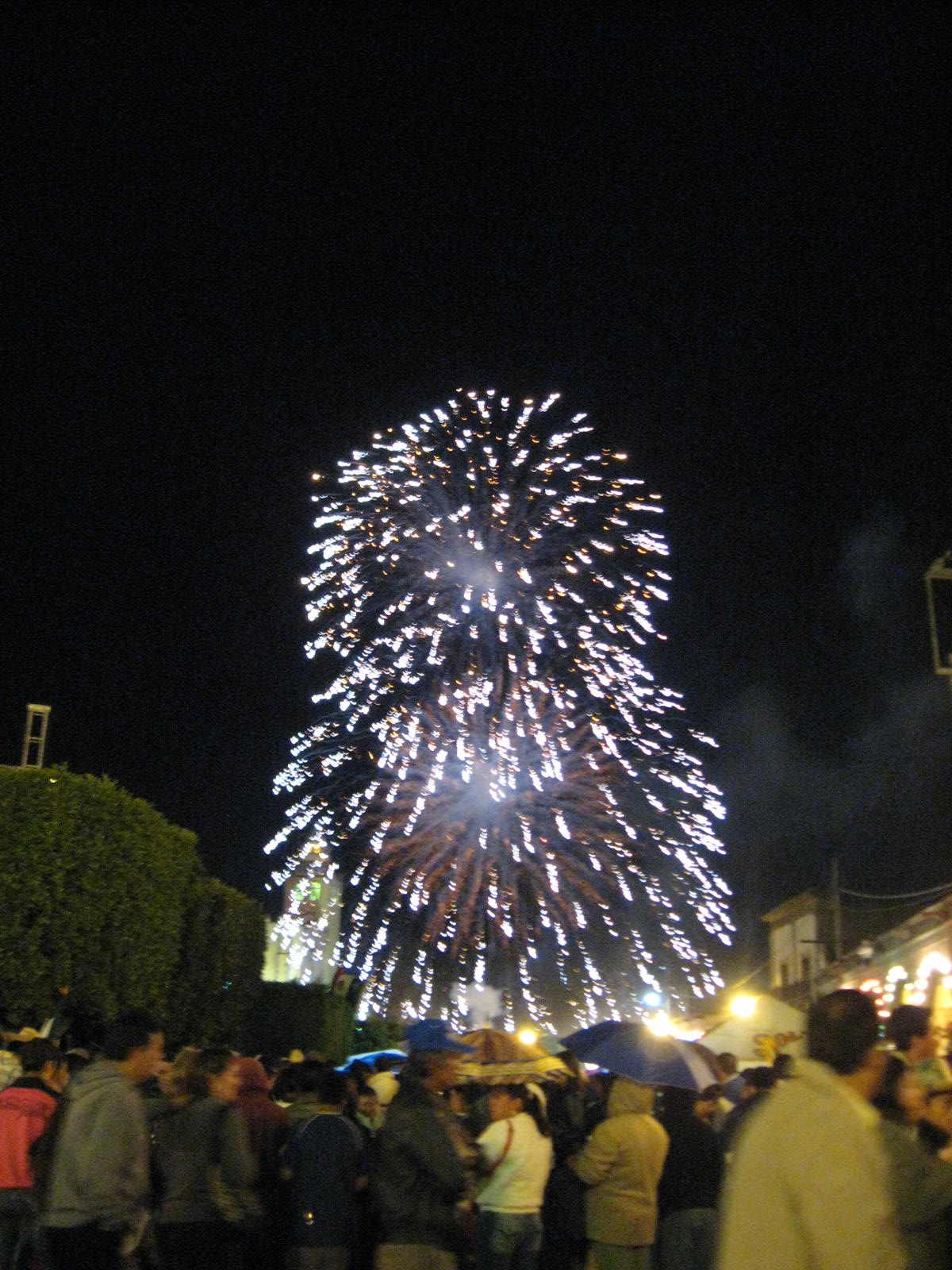
Fireworks over the Parish of San Miguel Arcángel church on 15 Sept 2008

== See also ==
- 2021 Tula River floods
