= Santiago de Anaya =

- Town and municipality
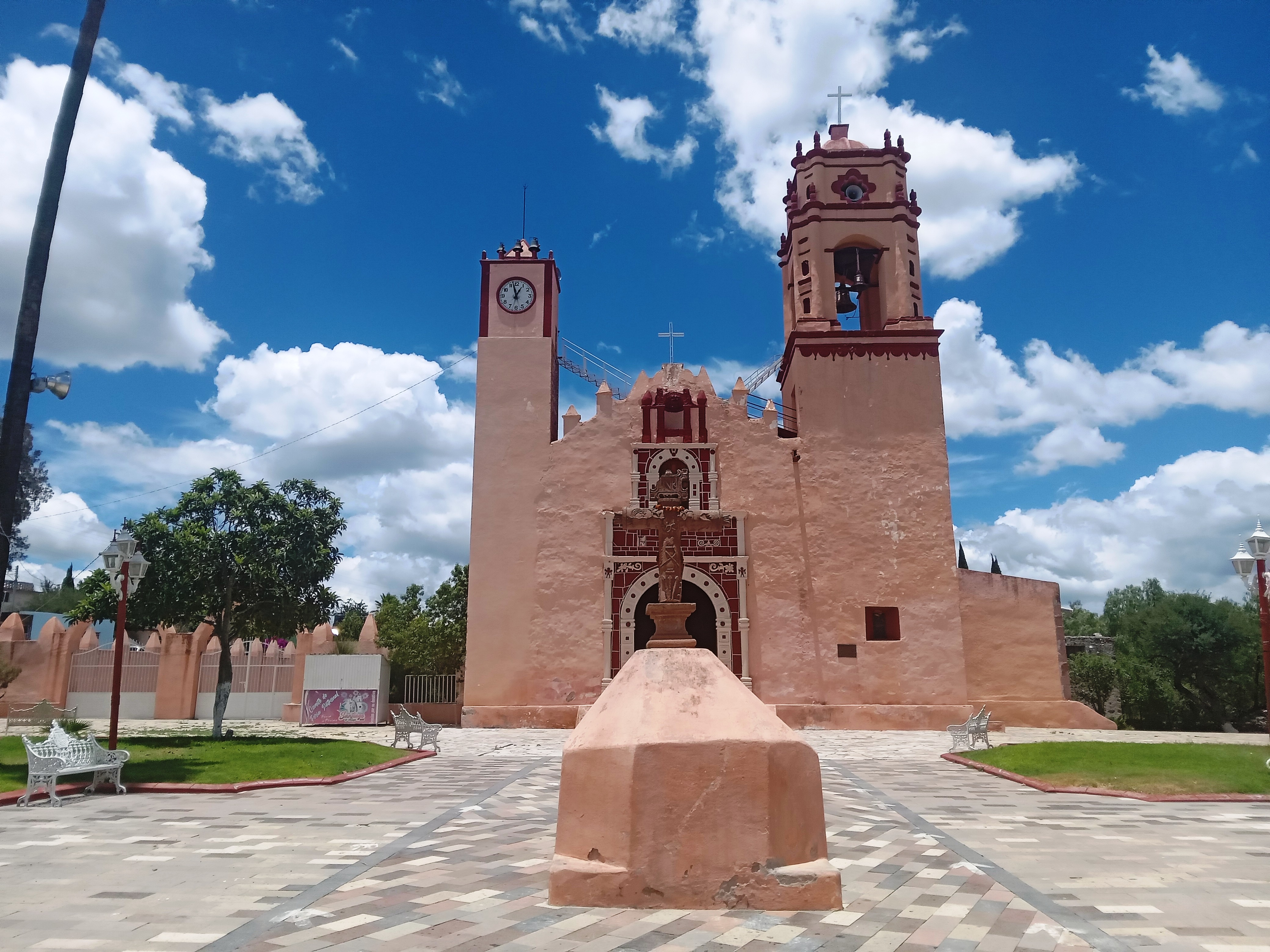
- Church of St James the Apostle, Santiago de Anaya

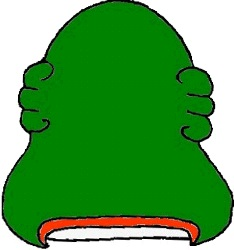
- Coat of arms

- Location within Hidalgo Location within Mexico
- Coordinates: 20°23′04″N 98°57′53″W
- Country: Mexico
- State: Hidalgo
- Municipality: Santiago de Anaya

Government
  - Federal electoral district: Hidalgo's 2nd

Area
  - Total: 316.1 km^{2} (122.0 sq mi)

Population (2005)
  - Total: 14,066
- Time zone: UTC-6 (Zona Centro)
- Website: santiagodeanaya.gob.mx

Santiago de Anaya is a town and one of the 84 municipalities of Hidalgo, in central-eastern Mexico. The municipality covers an area of 316.1 km^{2}.

The town is famous for its annual gastronomic festival, held for the last 37 years, featuring dishes prepared with plants and animals native to the region, including coyote, armadillo, rabbit, various snakes and xamues – long-legged, plant-eating bugs. The festival, held during Easter week attracts thousands of tourists.

The original name of the town was Tlachichilco, which means "the painted land."

As of 2015, the municipality had a total population of 17,032, according to the National Statistics Institute (INEGI) census.
