= San Salvador, Hidalgo =

San Salvador
- Town and municipality
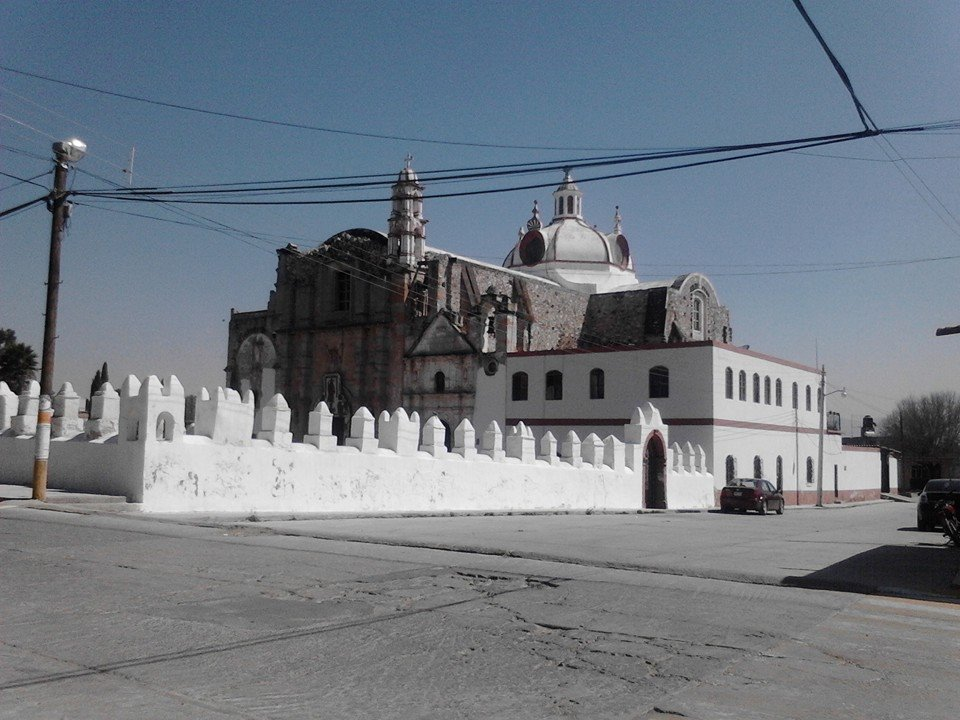
- Church of the Divine Saviour, San Salvador

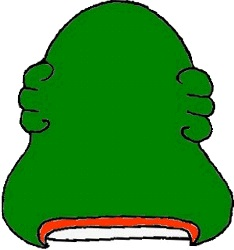
- Coat of arms

- Location within Hidalgo Location within Mexico
- Coordinates: 20°17′0″N 99°0′55″W
- Country: Mexico
- State: Hidalgo
- Municipality: San Salvador

Government
  - Federal electoral district: Hidalgo's 2nd

Area
  - Total: 200.4 km^{2} (77.4 sq mi)

Population (2005)
  - Total: 28,637
- Time zone: UTC-6 (Zona Centro)
- Website: sansalvador.gob.mx

San Salvador is a town and one of the 84 municipalities of Hidalgo, in central-eastern Mexico. The municipality covers an area of 200.4 km^{2} (77.4 sq mi).

As of 2005, the municipality had a total population of 28,637.
