= Nicolás Flores, Hidalgo =

Nicolás Flores
- Town and municipality
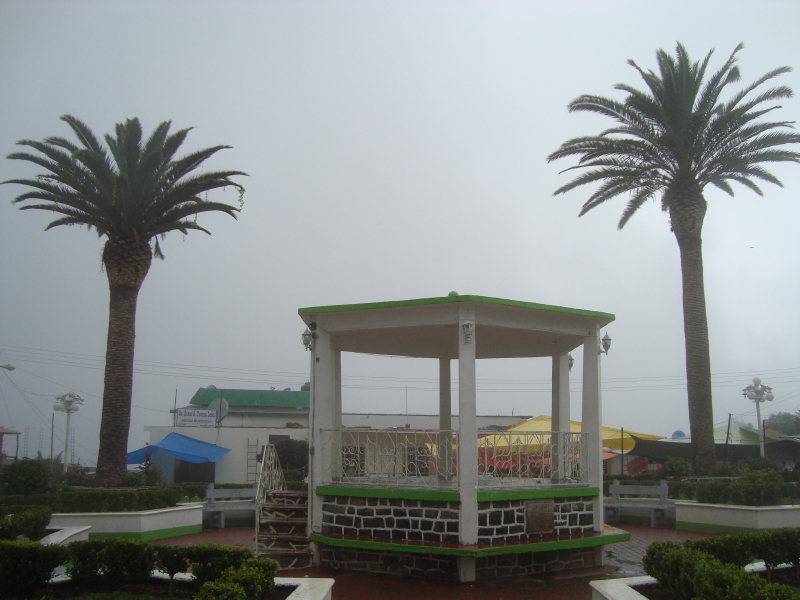
- Rainy day in main square

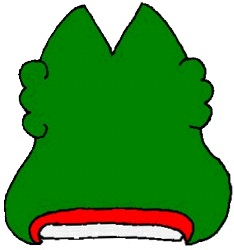
- Coat of arms

- Location within Hidalgo Location within Mexico
- Coordinates: 20°46′01″N 99°09′05″W
- Country: Mexico
- State: Hidalgo
- Municipality: Nicolás Flores

Government
  - Federal electoral district: Hidalgo's 2nd

Area
  - Total: 393.2 km^{2} (151.8 sq mi)

Population (2005)
  - Total: 6,202
- Time zone: UTC-6 (Zona Centro)
- Website: nicolasflores.gob.mx

Nicolás Flores is a town and one of the 84 municipalities of Hidalgo, in central-eastern Mexico. The municipality covers an area of 393.2 km^{2} (151.8 sq mi).

As of 2005, the municipality had a total population of 6,202. In 2017 there were 3,346 inhabitants who spoke an indigenous language, primarily Mezquital Otomi.
