= Jacala =

- Town and municipality
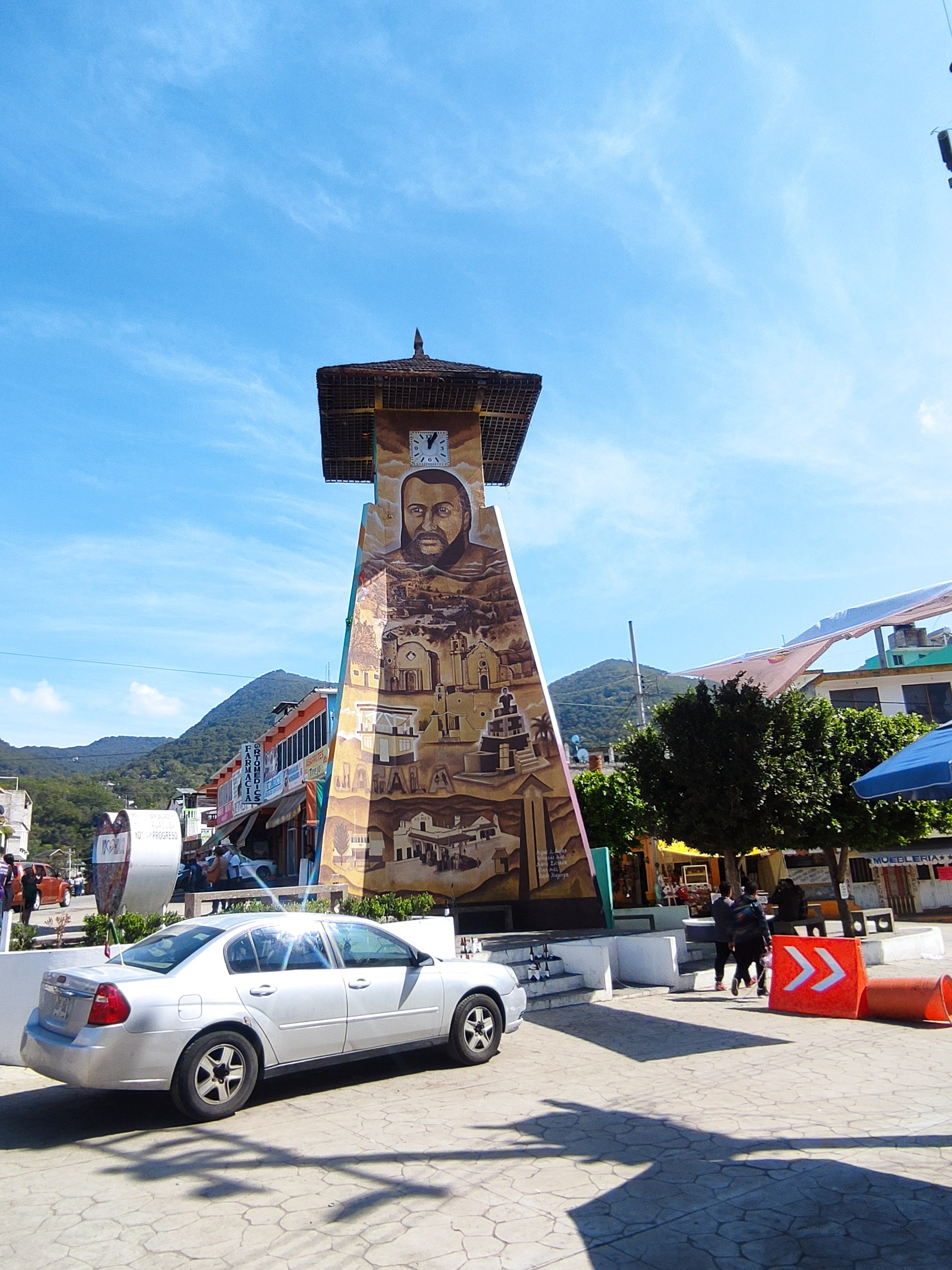
- Monumental clock in Jacala

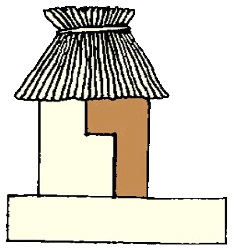
- Coat of arms

- Location within Hidalgo Location within Mexico
- Coordinates: 21°0′19″N 99°10′19″W
- Country: Mexico
- State: Hidalgo
- Municipality: Jacala de Ledezma

Government
  - Federal electoral district: Hidalgo's 2nd

Area
  - Total: 346.9 km^{2} (133.9 sq mi)

Population (2005)
  - Total: 12,057
- Time zone: UTC-6 (Zona Centro)
- Website: jacala.gob.mx

Jacala, officially Jacala de Ledezma , is a town and one of the 84 municipalities of Hidalgo, in central-eastern Mexico. The town serves as the municipal seat for the surrounding municipality of the same name, which covers an area of 346.9 km^{2} (133.9 sq mi).

As of 2005, the municipality had a total population of 12,057.
