= Tecozautla =

- Town and municipality
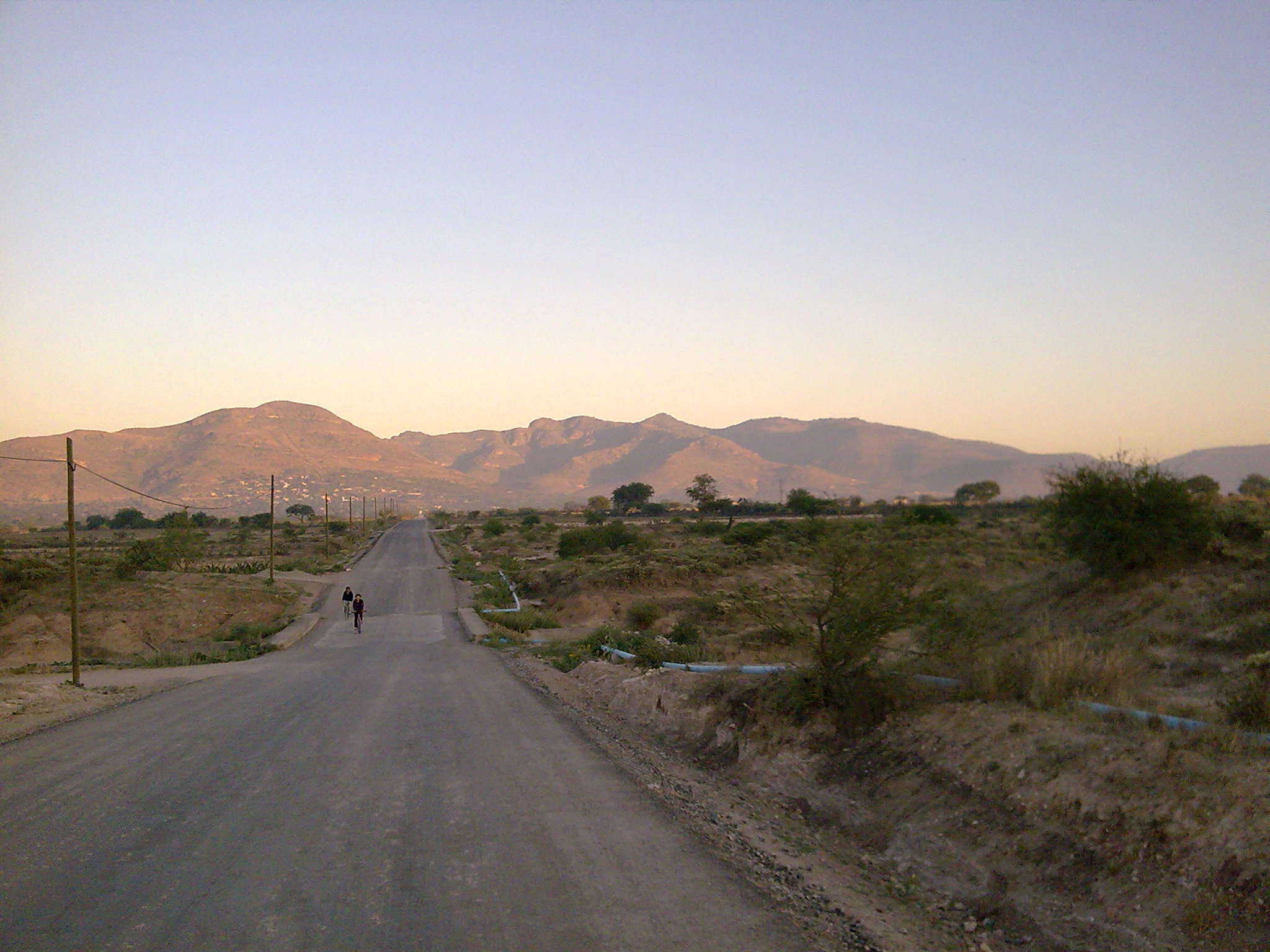
- A road to Huitexcalco

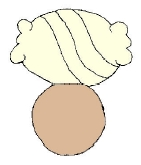
- Coat of arms

- Location in Mexico Tecozautla (Mexico)
- Coordinates: 20°32′N 99°38′W
- Country: Mexico
- State: 84 Municipalities of Hidalgo
- Municipality: Tecozautla (municipality)

Government
  - Type: Independent
  - Municipal President: Joel Elías Paso (2020-2024)
  - Federal electoral district: Hidalgo's 2nd

Area
  - Total: 575.6 km^{2} (222.2 sq mi)

Population (2005)
  - Total: 31,609
  - Density: 72.4/km^{2} (188/sq mi)
- Time zone: UTC-6 (Zona Centro)
- Postal code: 42440
- Area code: 761
- Website: gobiernodetecozautla.gob.mx

Tecozautla (Otomi: Masofo) is a town and one of the 84 municipalities of Hidalgo, in central-eastern Mexico. The municipality covers an area of 575.6 km^{2}. The name derives from the Nahuatl words "tetl", meaning "stone"; "cozaqui", meaning "yellow thing"; and "tla", meaning "place of"; making the entire meaning of Tecozautla "place where yellow earth abounds".

As of 2005, the municipality had a total population of 31,609. In 2017 there were 2,415 inhabitants who spoke an indigenous language, primarily Mezquital Otomi. The town was declared a "Pueblo Mágico" in 2015.

== Toponymy ==
The name Tecozautla comes from the Nahuatl tetl -stone-, cozauqui -yellow thing- and tla which means -place of-; which together means "Place where the yellow earth abounds". (Note: The etymological origin of the name of a)

== Geography ==
=== Relief and hydrographic ===
As for physiography it is located within the province of the Neovolcanic Axis; within the subprovince of Sierras y Llanuras de Querétaro and Hidalgo.

As for its geology it corresponds to the Neogene period (91.86%), Cretaceous (4.0%) and Quaternary (2.0%). With Extrusive igneous type rocks: basalt (29.86%), acid tuff (26.0%), volcanoclastic (12.0%), basic tuff-basic volcanic breccia (5.0%), acid tuff-acid volcanic breccia (5.0%) and rhyolite-acid tuff (2.0%); sedimentary: sandstone–conglomerate (12.0%) and limestone (4.0%); soil: alluvial (2.0%). Regarding pedology the dominant soil is phaeozem (45.86%), vertisol (26.0%), calcisol (19.0%) and leptosol (7.0%).

With regard to hydrology it is positioned in the hydrological region of the Pánuco River; in the basins of the Moctezuma River; within the sub-basins of the Tula River (35.0%), San Juan River (30.0%), Tecozautla River (21.0%) and Alfajayucan River (14.0%). It also has a dam, wells and springs.

=== Weather ===
The following climates are located in the municipal territory with their respective percentage: Semi-dry semi-warm (54.0%) and semi-dry temperate (46.0%). With an average annual climatological temperature of 17 °C with a total annual precipitation of 517 millimeters.

=== Ecology ===
The flora in the municipality is made up of a variety of trees such as oak, oyamel, biznaga, pitaya, huizache, maguey, cactus, organ and a large number of pirul trees, and some fruit trees. The fauna is made up of rabbits, rattlesnakes, hares, squirrels, ocelots, hawks, opossums, armadillos, deer, chameleons, coyotes, buzzards, insects and arachnids.
