= 2021 Tula River floods =

Natural disaster in Mexico

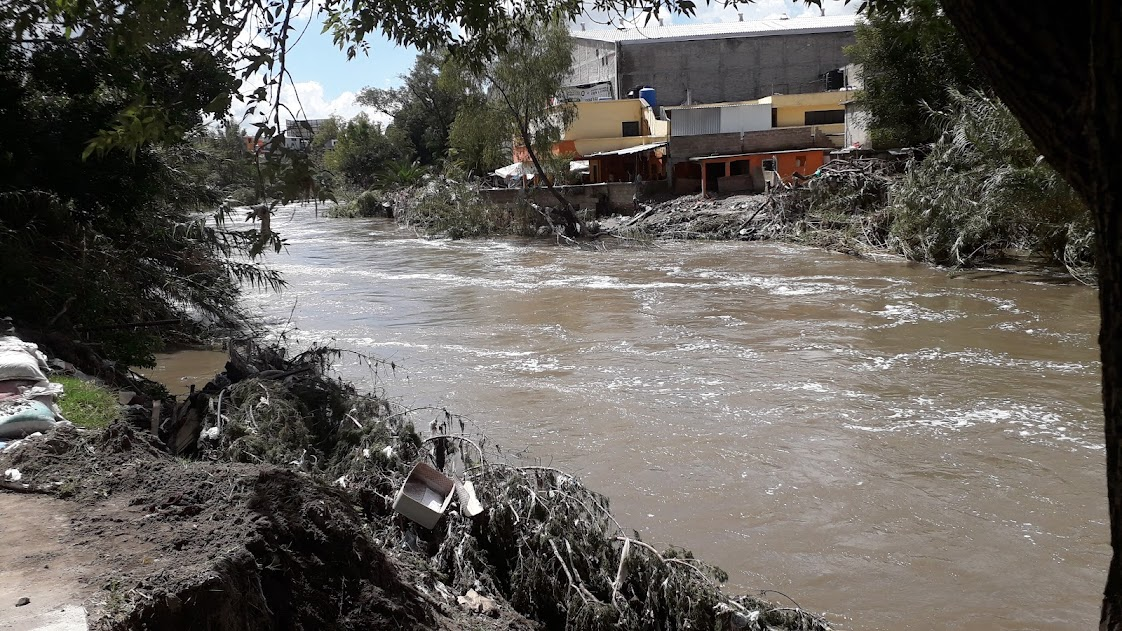
- View of the river and downtown Tula.
- Date: From the end of August to the beginning of October
- Location: Mezquital Valley
- Deaths: 15

The 2021 Tula River floods were a natural disaster caused by the overflow of the Tula River and several of its tributaries, affecting different municipalities in the Mezquital Valley in Hidalgo, Mexico.

The rising waters began in late August and early September; the first major floods occurred on September 6, mainly affecting the municipality of Tepeji del Río de Ocampo. In the early morning hours of September 7, the flooding of the river affected the city of Tula de Allende, and in the afternoon of that day it affected Ixmiquilpan. The next day, it affected the municipality of Tlahuelilpan, and then caused the water levels of the Zimapán Dam and the Moctezuma River to rise. River floods and overflows continued intermittently until early October.

The National Coordination of Civil Protection issued the Declaration of Emergency in the municipalities of Tlaxcoapan, Tula de Allende, Ixmiquilpan, Tezontepec de Aldama, Chilcuautla, Tasquillo, Tlahuelilpan, Tepeji del Río de Ocampo and Mixquiahuala de Juárez. At least 31,000 homes were affected. As well as 1700 commercial businesses, 3600 thousand hectares of cultivation, and more than 70,000 people affected.

Among the damaged infrastructure are: 10 spas, 11 schools, three hospitals, 14 drinking water systems, three flea markets and plazas, six pedestrian bridges and 23 vehicular bridges. The company Telmex reported that telephone and internet service had been affected in 18 towns.

== Background ==
The Tula River receives water from the drainage systems of Mexico City and its metropolitan area, particularly through the Central Emitter and Emisor Oriente Tunnel. The basin is the mouth of the rivers El Salto, Roses, Tepeji and Tlautla and the dams Danxhó, on the Tlautla River, and the Taxhimay and Requena, on the Tepeji River, which discharges into the Tula River and whose current is retained downstream of Tula de Allende by the Endhó Dam.

In August 2021, Hurricane Grace entered Mexican territory for the second time and affected several entities in the center and east of the country. En el caso de Hidalgo, el paso del huracán trajo consigo lluvias severas y provocó la saturación hídrica de los suelos de la región; The National Coordination of Civil Protection declared a disaster area to 27 municipalities of Hidalgo, located in the mountains and Huasteca Hidalgo.

Linked to this, a low pressure trough recorded in early September caused a series of severe storms in Mexico City, the State of Mexico and Hidalgo, resulting in an accumulation of 70 mm of rain and the onset of flooding in the Tula River basin. Also the rains recorded in the State of Mexico that caused flooding in the municipality of Ecatepec affected the Tula River.

== The floods ==
The growth of the waters in the Tula River began at the beginning of September, reporting overflows and damage in the municipalities of Tezontepec de Aldama, Chilcuautla and Alfajayucan. On September 6, the Tlautla River and the Palo Grande stream overflowed in the municipality of Tepeji del Río de Ocampo, affecting the communities of Santa Ana Atzcapotzaltongo and Los Álamos, and three neighborhoods were evacuated.

In the early morning of September 7, the Tula rivers and Rosas river overflowed and severely affected the city of Tula de Allende, when a large area of the central picture of the town was flooded. A first evacuation of the Tula area took place and the floods continued throughout the afternoon of the same day, when regional storms ended up flooding the eastern sector of the municipal capital. The water level reached up to two meters. Also on September 7, the Tula River overflowed in the city Ixmiquilpan and the area was evacuated for the first time. The water level reached up to seven meters; but of those, only two meters exceeded the level of the streets on the side of the bank.

On September 8, the Salado River (tributary of the Tula River) overflowed in Tlahuelilpan and the water level reached up to one meter. Other municipalities affected were Mixquiahuala de Juárez, Chilcuautla, Tezontepec de Aldama, and Tlaxcoapan. On the afternoon of September 8, the Government of Hidalgo requested the evacuation of the areas surrounding the Tula River, following the overflow of the Danxhó Dam and the discharge of the Taxhimay Dam, both in the State of Mexico. The water from the dams flowed during the night, slower than calculated. Also at night, the gates of the Requena dam, located about 15 kilometers from Tula, were opened.

On 9 September, a drop in the water level was reported in some areas of Tula; and in Ixmiquilpan the river level dropped to 4.80 m. Also on September 9, at 7:00 p.m., the release of the Zimapán dam began. In the municipality of Zimapán, the evacuation of the communities of Las Vegas and Las Adjuntas was announced. The municipalities of La Misión and Chapulhuacán in Hidalgo, and Tamazunchale in San Luis Potosí, issued alerts due to the rising waters of the Moctezuma River. A growth of the Moctezuma River of up to one and a half meters was reported. Subsequently, it was reported that the Tula River in Ixmiquilpan had decreased drastically, to only two meters. On September 12, the release of the Zimapán Dam ended. On September 16, the rains again caused flooding in the center of Tula de Allende. In Alfajayucan, the population was alerted by the release of the Chapantongo dams that connect with the Alfajayucan River. As a result of the rains in the Valley of Mexico, it was decided to close the gates of the Requena dam as a preventive measure. On the night of September 17, inhabitants of nine neighborhoods of Tula and two from Tepeji del Río were evacuated again due to the growth in river levels. The Palo Grande stream overflowed, near the place known as La Chorcha, and the old Mexico-Querétaro highway, in the town of Tlaxinacalpan, suffered considerable flooding. The overflow of the Nopala dam in Nopala de Villagrán was also reported, as well as some flooded streets.

In the early morning of September 18, the Tula River overflowed again in Tula de Allende. Several streets in the downtown area were reported flooded, reaching up to half a meter; Between 2:00 and 3:00 a.m. the highest water level was recorded, by 8:00 a.m. the water level dropped was reported. By September 18, a new release of the Zimapán Dam was reported. On September 19, faced with a new rise in the Tula River, Tula was evacuated for the third time and Ixmiquilpan for the second time. On September 20, around 4:00 a.m., the river began to overflow in the low areas of Tula, causing flooding at ramrod level; in Ixmiquilpan around noon, the river level reached a height of 5.25 m; which generated small overflows in the vicinity of the local sports unit.

On September 20, the Taxhimay, Requena, Endhó, Rojo Gómez, Vicente Aguirre and La Esperanza dams were reported to have released or spilled, as they had exceeded their storage capacity. On September 20, the release volume of the Zimapán dam was expanded and an alert was issued to the municipalities of Querétaro, Hidalgo, San Luis Potosí and Veracruz. The water level of the Zimapán dam was affected by the overflow of the Río San Juan in Querétaro, which caused flooding in Tequisquiapan and San Juan del Río. On September 23, rock falls and fragmentation of the hills located around the Zimapán dam were recorded.

On September 26, the release of the Zimapán dam was completed. On September 27 and 30, local storms caused new flooding in the central area of Tula de Allende, although the Tula River did not overflow. At the beginning of October, authorities warned of a new increase in the level of dams and rivers in Tula, Ixmiquilpan and Tezontepec. On October 3, the La Mora and La Carrera colonies, in Tula de Allende, were evacuated after the Tula River overflowed again. On October 4, some streets in Tula and Ixmiquilpan were flooded due to the overflow.

== Affected areas ==
=== Ajacuba ===
In the Ajacuba the water flooded three homes and brought down the perimeter fence of a school.

=== Alfajauucan ===
In Alfajayucan, the levels of the Dolores, Rojo Gómez and Vicente Aguirre dams reached their maximum levels and the flood of the Alfajayucan River caused damage to two houses in the municipal capital and three vehicular bridges of neighboring towns.

=== Atotonilco de Tula ===
In Atotonilco de Tula, the rains caused some waterlogging and minor damage, while the flood of the Tula River damaged a pedestrian suspension bridge and a vehicular bridge in the town of San José Acoculco, affecting, in turn, the inhabitants of El Recinto and Pueblo Nuevo, In the same way, the drinking water network that supplied the three communities was affected, leaving about 1,500 inhabitants without service.

=== Chilcuautla ===
In Chilcuautla, the rising waters destroyed part of the spa of Tlacotlapilco and severely damaged the town's stone bridge. Faced with the threat of a new overflow, people from the municipal capital, El Bethí and Palmiras, were evicted. The drinking water network of the localities of Tunititlan and Huitexcalco was damaged, which affected about 1,000 inhabitants. On October 1, one of the supports of the Miguel Hidalgo vehicular bridge collapsed in the community Tlacotlapilco.

=== Ixmiquilpan ===
On September 3, the Felipe Ángeles dam, fed by the Tula River, reported maximum levels in its discharge flow, so an alert was issued for the riverside communities of the municipality of Ixmiquilpan. In the afternoon-evening of that day, the first overflows were recorded at the height of a local sports unit and in the tourist development of the EcoAlberto Park, without significant damage. The La Heredad spa and the Granja de Mariana ecotourism center were also affected.

On September 7, the Tula River overflowed at several points in the municipality of Ixmiquilpan and an alert was issued for more than a dozen colonies and towns, among which were Barrio de Progreso, Barrio de Jesús, El Bondho, El Fitzhi, El Mandho, La Heredad, El Maye, Centro, San Antonio, San Javier, San Juanico, About a thousand inhabitants were evacuated, as well as the prisoners of the Ixmiquilpan Social Rehabilitation Center and the patients of the Rural Hospital number 30 of the IMSS Bienestar, which was flooded, were transferred to the Regional Hospital of the Mezquital Valley. The temporary shelters enabled were the auditorium of El Fitzhi, auditorium of Maguey Blanco and the command of Panales.

The pedestrian suspension bridge that connects the towns of El Mandho and La Heredad was dragged, the road that connects the community of El Mandho with the Progreso neighborhood was also damaged. In the town of El Mandho, in the vicinity of the El Arco stream, the Secretariat of Environment and Natural Resources of Hidalgo (Semarnath), confirmed the presence of three crocodiles, approximately 45 cm long. In the town of San Juanico, the drinking water network was affected, leaving about 700 people without water.

On September 18, before a new flood of the Tula River, it was asked to evacuate Vista Hermosa, San Javier, the Maye, San Nicolás, San Antonio, the Mandho, the Reforma, private Felipe Ángeles, Santos Degollado and Barrio de Progreso; three shelters were installed, one next to the Pasteur sanatorium, in Panales and in the municipal DIF.

=== Mixquiahuala de Juárez ===
The Baño Grande beach resort was affected by the overflow of the river.

=== Tasquillo ===
In Tasquillo, the overflow of the Tula River caused damage in urban areas, affected the Renacimiento and Tzindejéh spas, damaged the La Candelaria bridge and knocked down the one that connected the town of San Miguel. The authorities set up a temporary shelter in the offices of the Tasquillo DIF and canceled sporting events due to the risk of contagion from the COVID-19 pandemic.

=== Tetepango ===
In Tetepango, the overflow of an irrigation channel and some jagüeyes was recorded on the borders with Ajacuba, which partially blocked traffic between the two municipalities.

=== Tepeji del Río ===
In the municipality of Tepeji del Río de Ocampo, the affectations were mainly agricultural and some homes damaged. On September 7, the Tepeji River and the Requena Dam reached their maximum levels and the water caused flooding in four neighborhoods of the municipality. Subsequently, the municipal government evacuated three colonies; shelters were set up in the Los Colorines Event Hall in Colonia San Francisco (Zona Azul), the Melchor Ocampo Primary School in Colonia Tlaxinacalpan, the Tepeji Cultural Center in Colonia El Cerrito, and the Ejidal Salon Santiago Tlautla.

Later, the tajo de Nochistongo overflowed at the height of the town of Melchor Ocampo El Salto, where it flooded the area known as El Sabino; the inhabitants were evacuated and relocated to the ejido hall. On September 17, due to the heavy rains recorded, the Chorcha and Atengo neighborhoods were evacuated; the Melchor Ocampo primary school was enabled as a temporary shelter.

=== Tezontepec de Aldama ===
In Tezontepec de Aldama, the affectations began on September 2, when the Saldo River overflowed at the height of the La Cruz bridge in San Isidro Presas, where it damaged an overpass. On September 8, the Salado River and the Requena Canal flooded the municipal head, and the localities of Lázaro Cárdenas, February 5, Acayutlán, San Juan, Hidalgo The municipal president ordered the evacuation of the area in the face of the possible collapse of the board of the Salado River; five shelters were installed in the municipality. In addition, the waters blocked access to three communities in the municipality. The El Huemac spa was damaged. On the Tezontepec road of Aldama-Santa María Bathá, the asphalt event was fractured. The flood affected about 200 hectares of crops, two spas, and affected about 80 families.

=== Tlaxcoapan ===
On September 6, the overflow of the San Luis dam devastated corn fields of Atitalaquia and Tlaxcoapan, where a family was rescued by local police. On September 8, the flood of the Saldo River reached the bridge that connects the towns of Tlaxcoapan and Doxey, so it was temporarily closed. The local irrigation channels registered minimal spills, while the desolding of the Salty margins was carried out preventively. As a result of the rains, the authorities set up shelters in the Javier Rojo Gómez Primary School of the municipal capital and in the Doxey Auditorium.

=== Tula de Allende ===
During the early morning of September 7, the neighborhoods and towns of Rancho Chapultepec, Cruz Azul, El Chamizal, Denguí, San Marcos, La Malinche, El Chamizal, January 16, Centro and El Carmen were flooded. The level of the Tula rivers and Rosas river quickly exceeded two meters in the central area of the municipal capital, which caused the failure of the local electricity grid. By September 8, the authorities estimated that about 31,000 people had been affected and 10,000 more had been evacuated from the Tula area. The temporary shelters installed were the Municipal Auditorium, the Infonavit San Marcos Auditorium, the Pueblo Nuevo Chapel, the Malinche Chapel and the Tula Sports Unit.

The disaster caused the eviction of the General Hospital of Zone Number 5 of the Mexican Social Security Institute. The medical staff began to take the patients to the upper floors to safeguard their health. Patients and hospital employees were evacuated throughout September 8. The death of several animals from a veterinarian was also recorded, some animals remained in cages where they died. Rescuers from various organizations and citizens, carried out work to save the pets that remained trapped.

The Health Jurisdiction and the Tula Health Center were also damaged; as well as the National Pedagogical University Tula Campus, where the flood damaged computer equipment, furniture, and documents. At least 1,300 shops were damaged, and ten education centers were affected. Severe damage was reported to the infrastructure of the drinking water system, so after the flood nine communities, five subdivisions, part of the first picture of the city and the Tula Social Reintegration Center did not have water.

At least two attempts to rob a house-room were recorded in Tula de Allende. On September 9, neighbors of the Pemex Housing Unit arrested and beat two alleged thieves, these were handed over to the police. On September 11, inhabitants of the Montecillo neighborhood detained, tied up and beat two alleged criminals; municipal and state police transferred them to the offices of the Public Prosecutor's Office. On September 17, due to the heavy rains recorded, the colonies of January 16, Denghui, El Carmen, La Mora, La Malinche, San Lorenzo, San Marcos, Pemex Housing Unit and Central Zone, were evacuated again. Two temporary shelters were set up in the Sports Unit, and one in the Maturano room of the La Malinche neighborhood.

On September 19 due to a new increase in the level of the river, a third evacuation of the neighborhoods was carried out on January 16, Dengui, El Carmen, La Mora, La Malinche, San Lorenzo, San Marcos, PEMEX Housing Unit, downtown area, Fraccionamiento Rancho de Chapultepec; and temporary shelters were enabled in: the Gymnasium of the Sports Unit and "Third time".

=== Tlahuelilpan ===
On September 8, the Salado River overflowed, in the section from the Gavillero to the Cadenas, which forced the evacuation of the people from the place. The Cuauhtémoc, El Depósito and El Salitre colonies, as well as the area known as the Crescent, were flooded; The water affected the homes of a hundred families and caused the loss of more than 300 hectares of crops, as well as the partial blockade of the Tula-Tepeji and Tula-Tlahuelilpan roads. Shelters were opened in the Nezahualcóyotl high school, the Josefa Ortiz de Domínguez primary at "Chavez2021-09-08".

=== Zimapán ===
On September 11, as a result of the release of the Zimapán Dam, the Río Moctezuma blocked land access to the communities of Las Vegas and the Attached. The government implemented air support to deliver food and medicines. Also about 100 people, including elements of the Mexican Army, and the civilian population carried out an aid column, walking approximately 9 km to deliver food in the community of Las Vegas.

=== Other areas ===
Due to the release of the Zimapán dam, the operation of the Aqueduct II system that provides drinking water to the metropolitan area of Querétaro was stopped; by September 15, the operation of the Aqueduct II system of Querétaro was reactivated. A new suspension was announced on September 17, due to a new release of the dam. The communities of Vega de Ramírez and La Mora, in the municipality of Cadereyta de Montes, Querétaro; were partially isolated. W Which affected 30 families in the community. On September 20 on the issle of Tzibanzá, it was flooded after the water level at the Zimapán dam, tourists and workers were evicted.

On September 9, in the municipality of Tamazunchale in San Luis Potosí, the inhabitants of the neighborhoods San Rafael, Los Naranjos, Estrella, El Carmen and 16 de Septiembre, in the central area, Guadalupe, Ojoxio, Tezilo, in the Taman delegation, and the communities of Xomoco, Tazilal, Vega Larga

== Answer ==
On the morning of September 7, President Andrés Manuel López Obrador announced at a morning conference the activation of the Plan DN-III in the region and Civil Protection units and the Secretariat of National Defense were deployed in order to evacuate the disaster zone.

The governor of Hidalgo, Omar Fayad, visited the Tula area on September 7. He reported that during his tour, the boat in which he was traveling sank, but he was unharmed. About 1000 elements of the National Guard, soldiers of a detachment in the area and rescuers from Hidalgo and Mexico City are deployed in the affected area. On September 9, the Association of Municipalities of the State of Hidalgo (AMEH), delivered in support of a first trailer with 50 tons of food and four vactor units for the desilting of streets and drains.

On September 9 in Tula, cleaning work began at the following points on January 16, Denghuí, La Malinche, La Mora, San Lorenzo, San Marcos, Tianguis municipal, PEMEX housing unit and the Central area. In Ixmiquilpan, trade was reactivated in the central area. The governor of Hidalgo, Omar Fayad visited the Tepeji area on September 9. For September 10 in the areas of Vista Hermosa and San Javier in Ixmiquilpan, cleaning work began; work also began in Tlahuelilpan.

The Ministry of Health of Hidalgo placed four mobile medical units; two operate in the La Malinche neighborhood and on Felipe Ángeles Avenue in Tula de Allende, and the remaining two installed in El Fithzi and San Nicolás in Ixmiquilpan. Derived from the affectation of the Tula Health Center, the El Llano Health Center provides 24-hour medical care; as well as the care and detection of COVID-19 and was established as a permanent anti-covid vaccination module. A mobile Covid case detection unit was placed in zone zero in Tula.

On September 11, a second cleaning stage began in Tula de Allende; with 650 more elements of the Sedena, 5 tipping units, 2 pipes, 2 loaders with backhoe, a front loader and a motor shaping machine for cleaning. The State DIF System of Hidalgo reported that by September 11, it had received 90 tons of humanitarian aid. On September 16, a group of residents marched to demand the resignation of the municipal president, Manuel Hernández Badillo. By September 18, a total of 230 tons of support have been distributed.

A total of 4712.5 tons of waste was collected in the area of Tula, 344 tons from the municipalities of Tasquillo, Tezontepec de Aldama, Ixmiquilpan and Chilcuautla, as well as 285 tons of sludge in the municipality of Ixmiquilpan. As well as the Encalado, 81 forest fire brigades, workers from the regional offices of the Semarnath in Tula, ecoguard ecological patrols were reported in the area, for the supervision and guidance of trucks with waste. On October 5, the agreement was issued by means of which the Emergency Declaration is concluded.

== See also ==
- 2021 Atlantic Hurricane Season
- Tabasco and Chiapas flood of 2007
- 2020 Southeastern Mexico Floods
