= Mezquital Valley =

Region of Hidalgo, Mexico

Coordinates: 20°27′9.9″N 99°14′56.81″W

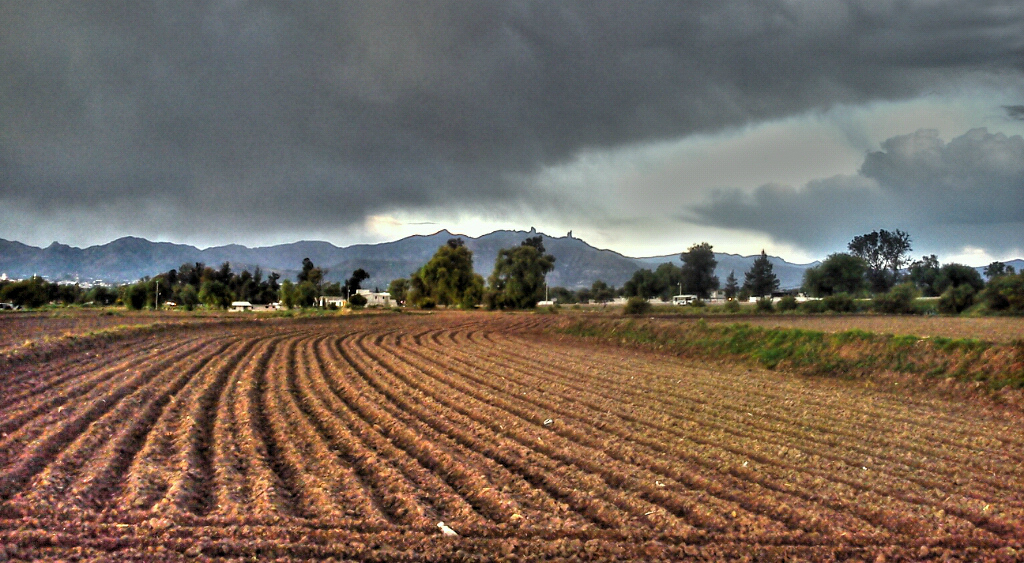
Farmland near the town of Actopan in the Valley

Location of the Valley in Hidalgo

The Mezquital Valley (Mezquital Otomi: B’ot’ähi) is a series of small valleys and flat areas located in Central Mexico, about 60 kilometres (37 mi) north of Mexico City, located in the western part of the state of Hidalgo. It is part of the Trans-Mexican Volcanic Belt, with altitudes between 1,700 metres (5,600 ft) and 2,100 metres (6,900 ft) above sea level. It is one of Mexico's main semi-arid/area regions, whose native vegetation is dominated by cactus species, mesquite trees, and maguey with pine and oak trees in the highest elevations. It is considered to be part of the northern extension of Mesoamerica, with one major archeological site, Tula, which was the main city of the Toltecs, an important influence for the later Aztecs. However, from the Aztec period to the 20th century, it was sparsely populated and very poor, with one main indigenous ethnicity, the Otomis. In the 20th century, irrigation works were created to take advantage of the water in the Tula River, along with wastewater drained from the Valley of Mexico for agriculture. Today, the valley produces various grains and produce, including one-quarter of all green chili peppers grown in Mexico.

== Geography and environment ==
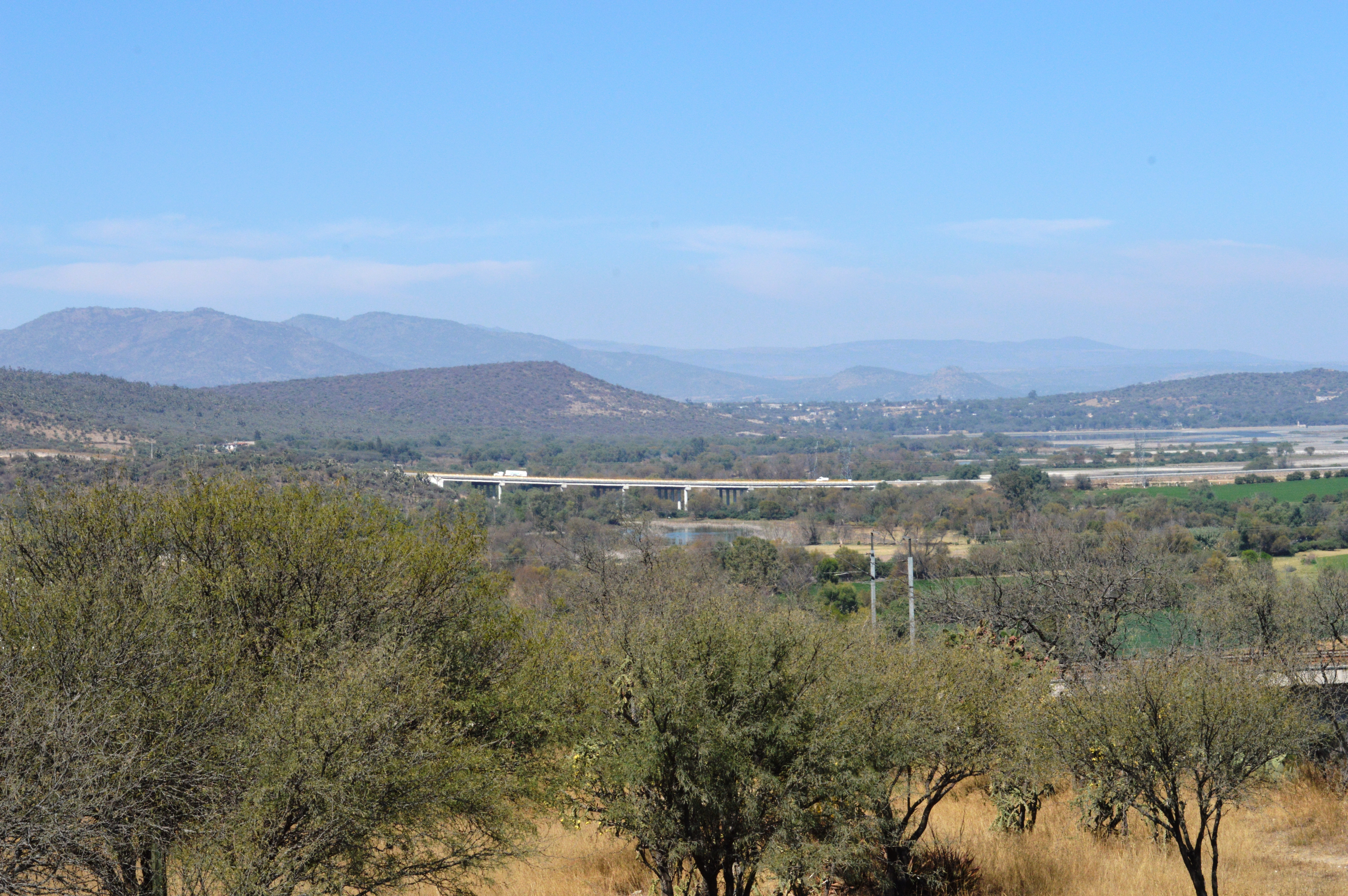
View of the Tula River in Tula Municipality, State of Hidalgo.

The Mezquital Valley is located in the central Mexican Highlands about 60 kilometres (37 mi) north of Mexico City. It covers 7,000 km^{2} (2,700 sq mi) in the west of the state of Hidalgo and small portions extending into the State of Mexico and Querétaro. With an altitude of between 1,700 and 2,100 m (5,600 and 6,900 ft) above sea level, it is part of the Trans-Mexican Volcanic Belt. The valley consists of smaller valleys such as the Actopan, Ixmiquilpan, and the Tasquillo, along with some flatlands. What unifies the region is its waterways, such as the Tula and Alfajayucan rivers, as well as streams such as the Alfajayucan, Arroyo Zarco, Rosas and Salado, as well as history and culture.

It is one of the four main arid/semi arid regions of Mexico, along with Baja California, the Tehuacán-Cuicatlán Valley, and the Chihuahua Desert. These four regions together account for 60 percent of Mexico's territory. The average annual precipitation of the valley is 385 mm (15.2 in), less than half of the state average of 866 mm (34.1 in). In the elevations of surrounding mountains between 2,000 and 2,800 m (6,600 and 9,200 ft), the climate is temperate and moister, with rains in the summer. Below this level, the area is semi-arid steppe. The valley is drained by the Tula River.

The vegetation of the valley is divided into zones. Forests of pine and oak dominate the higher mountain areas. The lower valley floor is semi-arid except for areas along riverbanks which have some tropical vegetation. In some canyons, thermal inversion also allows for a more humid climate. Dominant vegetation includes various cacti, mesquite, and maguey, as most of the valley is dry. Other important wild species include cypresses (Taxodium mucronatum and Cupressus spp.), pine (Pinus spp.), willow (Salix spp.), oak (Quercus spp.), huisache (Vachellia farnesiana), cardón (Ilex or Pachycereus spp.), barrel cactus (Echinocactus spp.), yucca (Yucca spp.), huapilla (Hechtia spp.), cucharilla (Dasylirion spp.), cat's claw (Mimosa spp.), zacate (Setaria spp. or Muhlenbergia macroura), chipil (Crotalaria spp.), pasto de agua (Potamogeton pusillus), reeds (Scirpus or Typha spp.), and various species of the family Asteraceae. It has significant biodiversity in its fauna but much is relatively unstudied.

Economic development in the 20th century has caused environmental problems, especially in the south of the valley. These include air and soil pollution from an important refinery and electric power plant near the city of Tula. The most serious problem comes from wastewater which is pumped into the area from the neighboring Valley of Mexico. The wastewater comes from drainage projects that carry water out of the Valley of Mexico and dump it into the Tula River, with most of the water not treated adequately or not treated at all. The wastewater is a mix of residential and industrial water, which includes contaminants such as bacteria (such as cholera) from fecal matter and toxic chemicals. This contamination is severe enough in places to be seen and smelled. Nevertheless, the water is an important source for irrigated farming, especially in the Tula and Alfajayucan areas, with the water "treated" by letting it soak through the soil. The water causes contamination of groundwater, including water that eventually becomes part of the Pánuco River, affecting coastal lagoons on the Gulf of Mexico.

== Demographics and economy ==
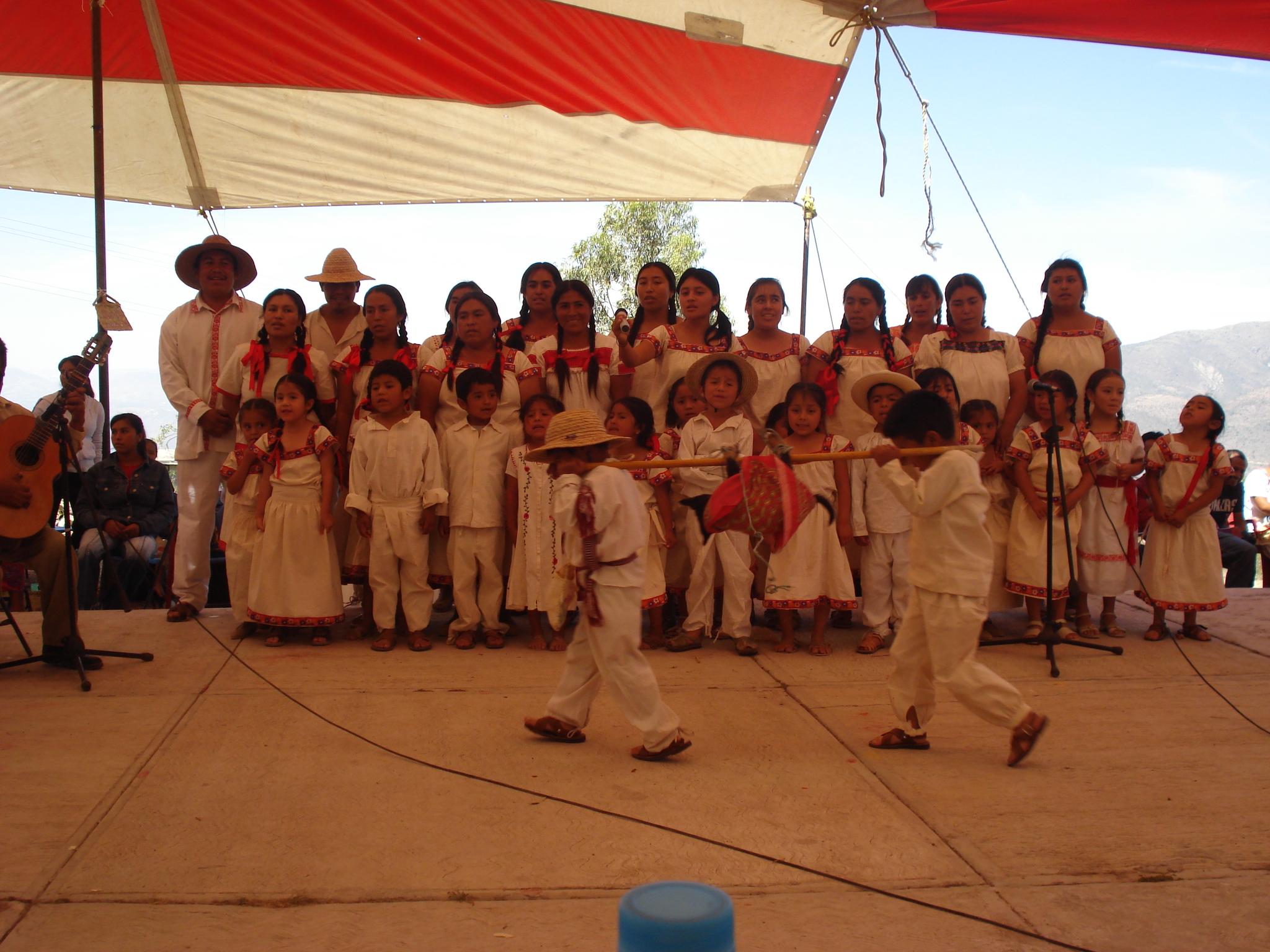
Mezquital Otomi

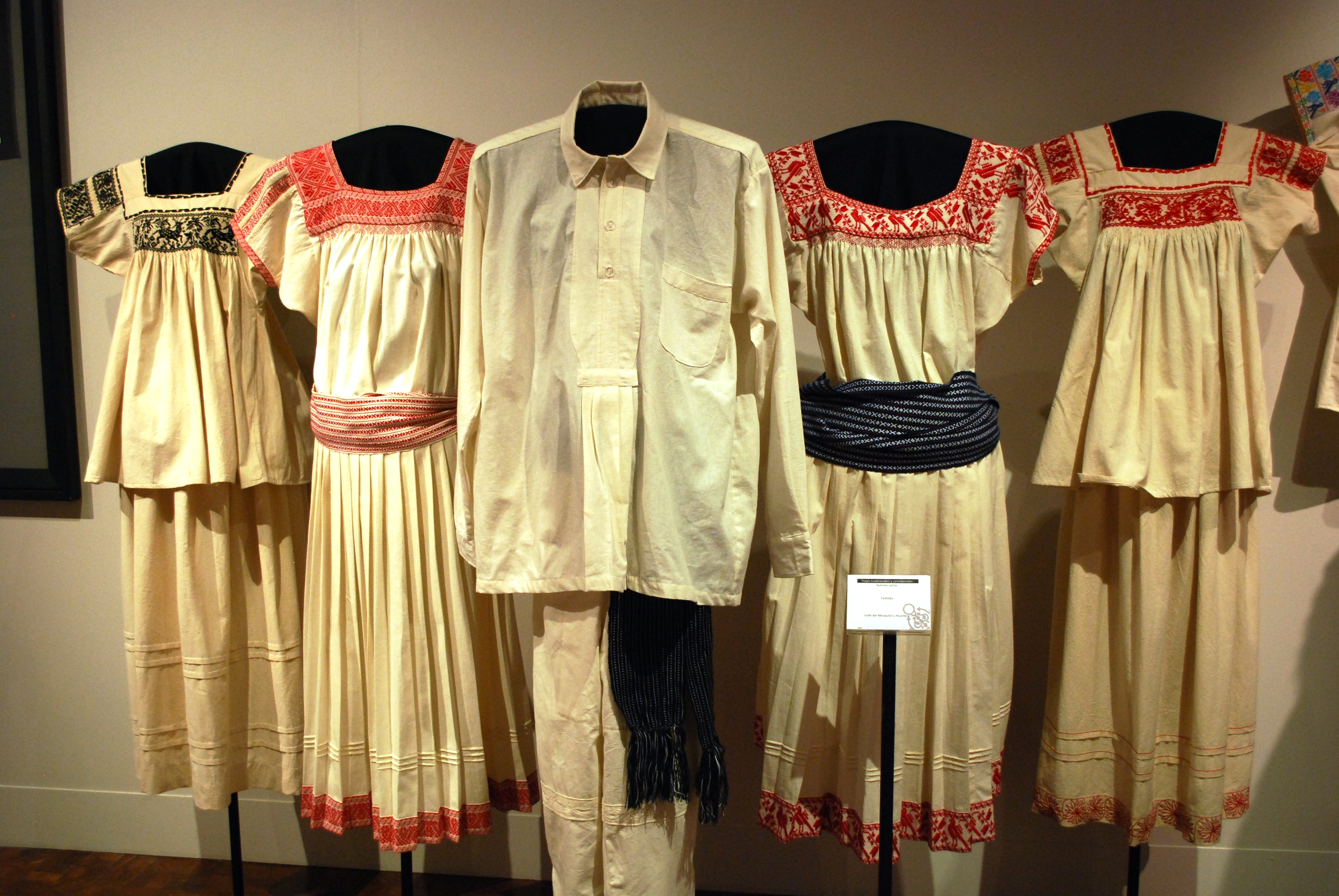
Traditional Otomi dress on display at the Museo de Arte Popular.

The valley covers 33.7% of the state of Hidalgo and is divided politically into 27 municipalities, with a population of about 420,000.

While most inhabitants are mestizo, the Otomi people have been the dominant indigenous ethnicity since the Classic period of the Mesoamerican era. The center of the Otomi community is Ixmiquilpan. The weaving trade was a way to survive in the harsh environment before the introduction of irrigated farming. The Otomi language of the valley is spoken by an estimated 115,000 people, especially in the municipalities of San Salvador, Chilcuautla, Ixmiquilpan, Alfajayucan, Tasquillo, Nicolás Flores, Cardonal, and Huichapan. Traditionally, these Otomi are known for their handcrafts, especially the creation of textiles from ixtle fiber and the making of pulque, both from the maguey plant. Both are usually made by Otomi families who gather the raw materials and sell the finished products.

Many Otomis still use garments made of undyed cotton called "manta". Women wear a blouse or shirt with a square neckline, which has embroidery. Over this many wear quechquemitls, of blue, purple, or black wool, as well as rebozos in similar colors and designs. The lower half of the body is covered by a wraparound skirt. Women usually braid their hair with ribbons or strips of fabric, and wear huarache sandals.

The Otomi municipality of Ixmiquilpan is noted for its use of insect projects such as escamoles (ant eggs/larvae) and mezcal worms. These are often eaten in tacos or gorditas, along with various sauces. Another important food is the nopal cactus, as well as seeds and flowers from other cactus species. The Muestra Gastronómica del Valle del Mezquital, which began in 1980, is an annual demonstration of the gastronomic and cultural diversity of the valley. It is held in the community of Santiago de Anaya and includes indigenous storytelling and dance along with food.

A significant percentage of the population lives under what is called usos y costumbres (uses and customs), a legal way to allow indigenous communities to keep traditional authority structures. These are concerned with community rather than individual welfare, based on systems from the pre-Hispanic and colonial periods. These particularly apply to Otomi communities. However, there have been problems with these, with sanctions deemed severe and authorities accused of being arbitrary. There have also been problems with tribal law conflicting with the rights guaranteed by the Mexican Constitution. For example, in Ixmiquilpan, Tasquillo, Nopala, Huichapan, and Chapantongo, women are not allowed to vote for community authorities.

Since the latter 20th century, the valley has become an important agricultural center for the state of Hidalgo, growing corn, beans, wheat, onions, tomatoes, cactus fruit, and peaches; the valley also produces one-quarter of all green chili peppers grown in Mexico. It also produces alfalfa, principally used to feed the area's cattle. A small but important quantity of lettuce, cabbage, cilantro, radishes, carrots, spinach, and parsley is grown. There are also a number of fish farms, especially in Tezontepec de Aldama. About 61% of the population works in agriculture, which has been made possible by the diversion of wastewater from the neighboring Valley of Mexico through the Tula River. Sixty percent of the farmland is irrigated with wastewater. Thirty nine percent of the farmland is dependent on clean water sources such as wells and rain, and only 0.38 percent is irrigated with treated water. The areas most dependent on wastewater are: Actopan, Ajacuba, Alfajayucan, Atitalaquía, Atotonilco de Tula, Francisco I. Madero, Chilcuautla, Mixquihuala, San Salvador, Tasquillo, Tetepango, Tezontepec, Tlahuelilpan, and Tlaxcoapan. The areas that use wastewater are more productive, as the water contains phosphorus and nitrogen, but the products are more likely to have problems with contaminants. These contaminants also pose a risk to farm workers and their families.

Economic development includes industry especially in the south. Tula has a major oil refinery as well as an electrical plant. Fabric is woven in Tepeji, cement in Cruz Azul, Atotonilco. and Huichapan. Ixmiquipan and Actopan are important regional commercial centers. Traditional handcrafts include items made from ixtle fiber, baskets, weaving, pottery, and wood items. There are water parks and hiking areas in the mountain areas, which mostly attract families from the state of Hidalgo. These include El Xicuco (between Tula and Tlahuililpan), El Hualtepec (near Huichapan), and Los Frailes (near Actopan).

== History ==
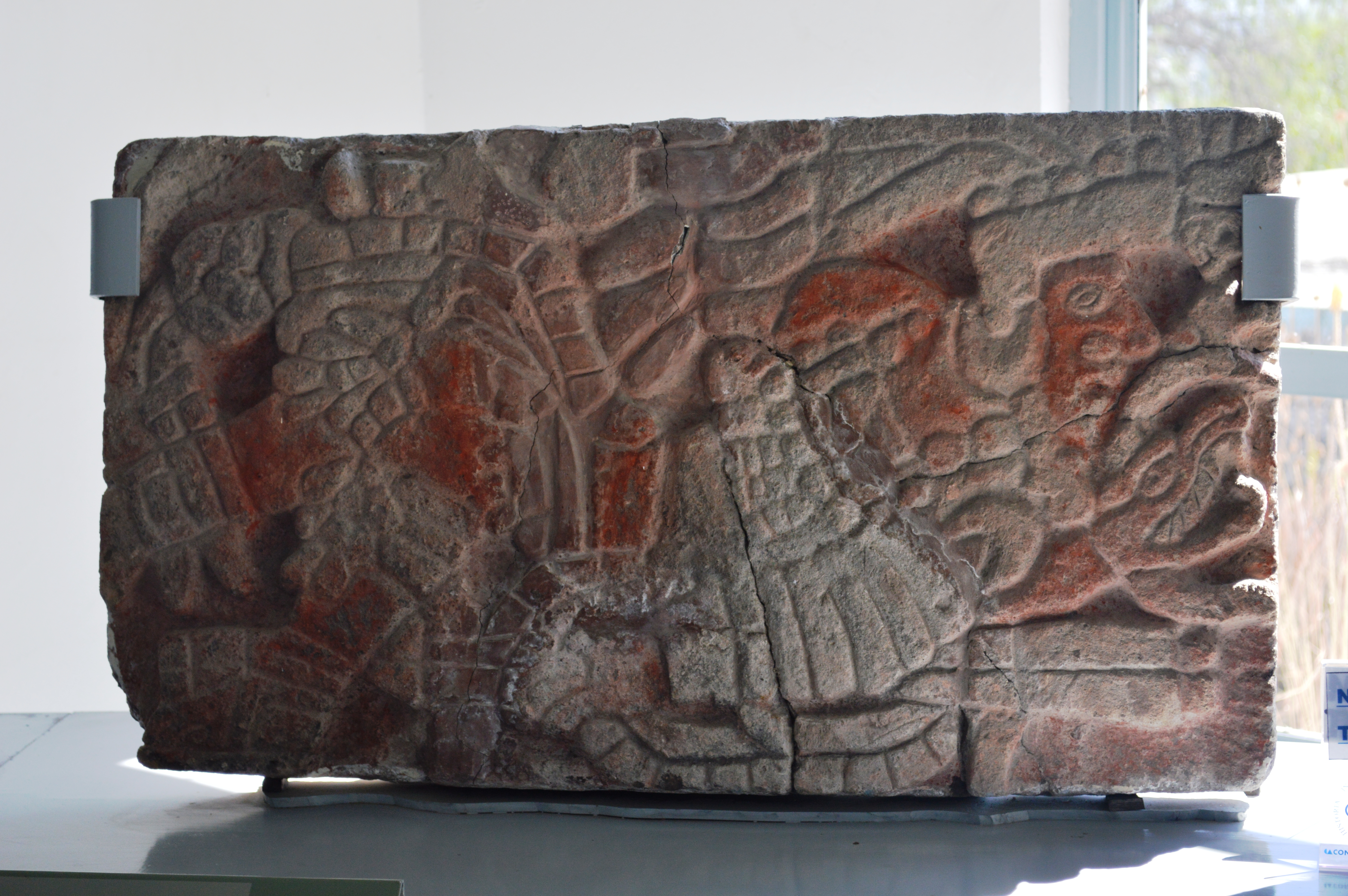
Image of Toltec ruler in relief from the Tula archeological site

The valley has been populated at least since the Mesoamerican period, especially in the south around what is now Tula. It is considered to be the northern edge of Mesoamerica, with evidence of agriculture on terraces and some irrigation, at least in Tula, as well as hunter-gatherer communities. While there has been work on a number of sites, many have been damaged or destroyed by the irrigation works related to the Tula River, as well as areas in Ixmiquilpan, Actopan, Mixquiahuala, Tlahuililpan, and Ajacuba. In the Preclassic period, there were small settlements showing influence from Chupícuaro and Ticoman. The settlement of the northwest of the valley began in the Classic period by Xajay groups with possible Chupicuaro-Mixtlan connections. The southeast was settled by those affiliated with Teotihuacan, mostly in the Tula area.

The most significant pre-Hispanic city was Tula, which came to regional prominence after the fall of Teotihuacan and before the rise of Tenochtitlan in the Valley of Mexico. It was the seat of the Toltec civilization, thought to have a mixed ethnic population, with a significant number of Otomis. The Toltec empire reached as far south as the Valley of Mexico and its influence has been found in artifacts as far away as the current U.S. Southwest. It is believed that aguamiel was first extracted around 1100 CE, which led to the making of pulque. The last Toltec ruler was Cē Ācatl Topiltzin Quetzalcōātl, who came to power in 1085. Stories about Tula were an important part of Aztec lore, with the god Quetzalcoatl possibly a deification of the last Toltec ruler.

While the Otomi presence is notable since the Epiclassic period, the valley became dominated by this ethnicity in the Postclassic period, when the rise of the Aztec Empire drove many southern Otomi into the valley. They have remained the dominant indigenous population to the present day. While the Aztecs held sway of much of the valley in the south, they never completely subjugated the Otomis, in part because of Otomi tendency to be nomadic. However, there was trade between the two peoples. Aztec records indicate that cotton was collected in part of the area as tribute, but this has been debated because of the area's dry climate. Other important products of the region at the time included limestone, maguey, nopal and wild animal skins.

Only after the Spanish conquest did the Otomi of the valley become more settled, although to this day there are some fringe groups which still maintain much of the hunter-gatherer traditions. The Tula area was initially ruled for the Spanish by Pedro Miahuazochil in Tula and Pedro Rodríguez de Escobar in Ixmiquilpan. The ecology of the valley began to change dramatically in the colonial period, mostly due to logging and the introduction of grazing animals, especially sheep, causing erosion and other damage.

The colonial period in the valley was heavily influenced by the Hacienda system. A number of haciendas (Spanish plantations) owned by the Spanish, with permission from the Spanish Crown, controlled vast lands and great number of workers from where earnings were generated through ranching, agriculture and property rental. Naturally, colonial social and economic life circled around each hacienda, where Hacienda Demiñho was one of the most important and influential in the Mezquital Valley.

During the Mexican War of Independence, insurgent forces under Ignacio López Rayón made camp to Ixmiquilpan and also defeated royalist forces in the nearby village of Tamaleras, now called López Rayón. In 1854 a local uprising, especially in the communities of Orizabita and Remedios, arose in response to the excessive taxes levied by Ixmiquilpan authorities. The protesters were led by Sotero Lozano, who was called a bandit. This leader was most active in the towns of Actopan and Cardonal, his hometown.

The valley saw a number of battles during the Mexican Revolution, especially between those loyal to Venustiano Carranza and Emiliano Zapata. It also saw the peasant uprise in 1919 against Hacienda Demiñho, where its destruction and massacre ended this hacienda's hegemony in the region.

However, because of climate, the valley remained sparsely populated and very poor from the colonial period until the 20th century. In the early 20th century, a rail line was built to link the valley to Pachuca. The rail line was planned by Englishman Richard Honey, who came to Ixmiquilpan with his family to settle. The rail line was supposed to run from Pachuca to Tampico, Tamaulipas but it was built only as far as Ixmilquilpan.

At this time efforts to divert water from the Tula River for irrigation began, with the Tecolote Dam built along with the El Morelos and El Moro Canals. Later the Capula Dam was built, along with another canal to bring wastewater in from the Valley of Mexico.

In the 1940s the Mexico City/Laredo highway was built through the area, which gave the valley more connection with the outside world.

In 1951, by presidential decree, the Patrimonio Indígena del Valle de Mezquital (Valley of Mezquital Indigenous Heritage) was created in Ixmiquilpan by President Miguel Alemán Valdés and state governor D. Quintín Rueda Villagran to promote Mezquital Otomi culture and education. These and many other infrastructure and economic development projects have changed much of the valley's way of life, especially in Tula and Ixquimilpan.

Today the valley is an important agricultural region for the state of Hidalgo, growing corn, beans, wheat, onions, tomatoes, cactus fruit, and peaches. It produces one-quarter of Mexico's green chili peppers. However, there are still problems with poverty, especially among the Otomis. From the 1980s, many Otomis migrated away from the valley to the United States, with large communities from this area settling in Clearwater, Florida and Las Vegas. However, in 2011, the head of the Otomi Supreme Council in Ixmiquilpan stated that migration to the US from the area's Otomi had diminished, principally due to the US's poor economy.

The valley has also had recurring conflicts over land and water resources, especially in Cardonal, Ixmiquilpan, and Tasquillo. The disputes have resulted in numerous protests and affected local elections. While the situation is not as dire as in various municipalities in the state of Guerrero, there have been reports of armed groups in the valley. These exist generally to protect a certain segment of the population rather than an entire community. These groups have been influenced by events in Guerrero since the 1990s, especially by the Popular Revolutionary Front. However, violent conflicts go back further than this. One major dispute is over 102 hectares of land on the border between Ixmiquilpan and El Cardonal, which has led to paramilitary groups taking over areas.

== Important locations ==
=== Population centers ===
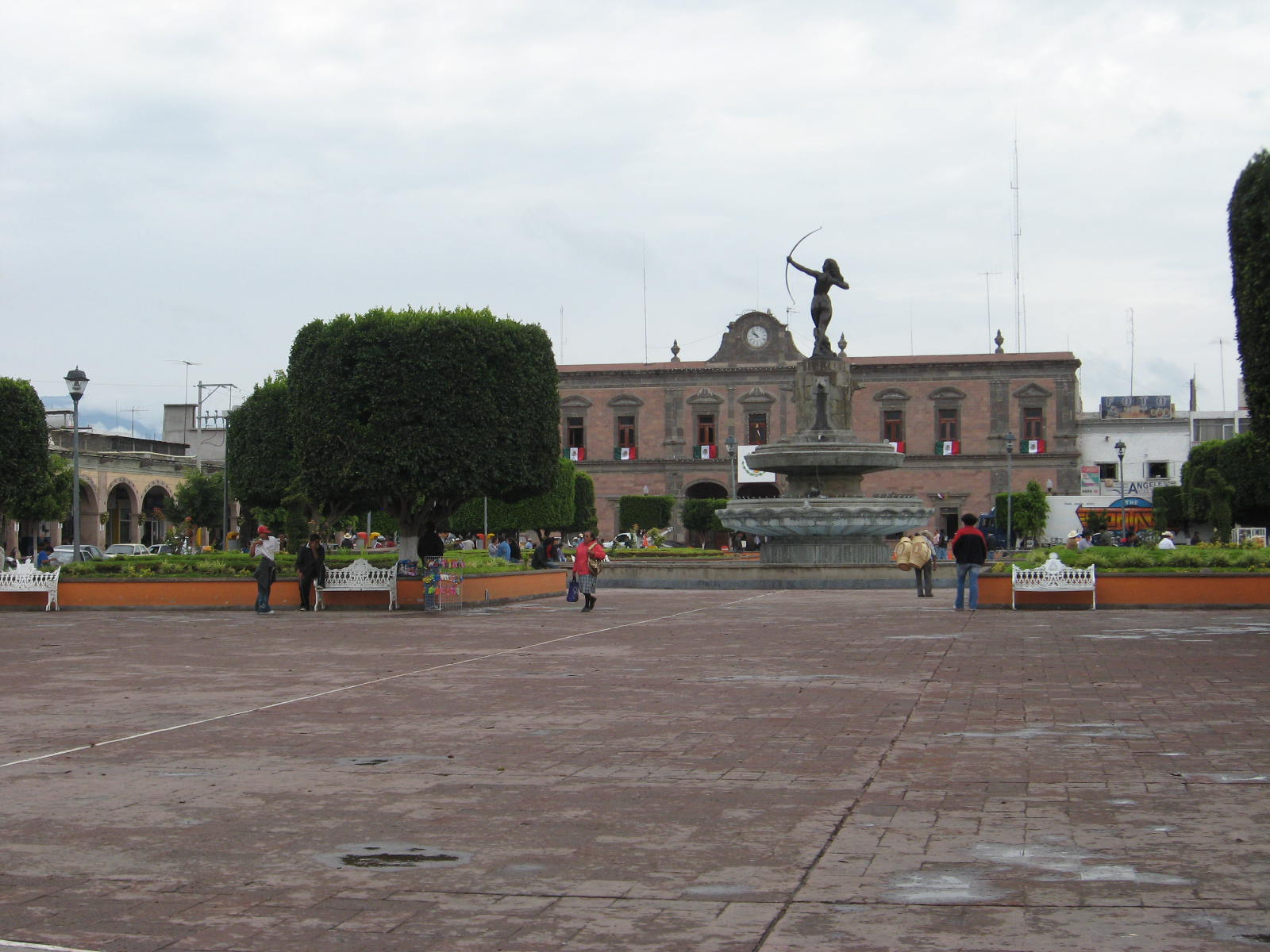
Main plaza of Ixmiquilpan

The town of Ixmiquilpan is the center of the Mezquital Valley, especially its Otomi population. The center of this town is its parish church, named after the Archangel Michael. It is noted for its large series of murals done in the 16th century by native artists depicting Eagle and Jaguar warriors in battle, along with other pre-Hispanic imagery. This parish church is typical of the fortress-style churches built by the Augustinians in the 16th century. The facade is Plateresque style with paired columns and with a window in the choir area. The bell tower is annexed and joined with the facade. It has a crown and bell gables. Imagery that is repeated here is that of holy war with Eagle and Jaguar warriors, as well as images associated with the sun and moon gods. The Jaguar and Eagle warriors were some of the armies that the Spanish fought during the Conquest; they wore resplendent apparel. Few explicit pictorial references to these warriors were permitted afterwards. The murals at Ixmiquilpan are an exception. The murals here appear in a series of polychrome frescos, which have structure in a large and coherent way. The parish church was declared a national monument in 1933.

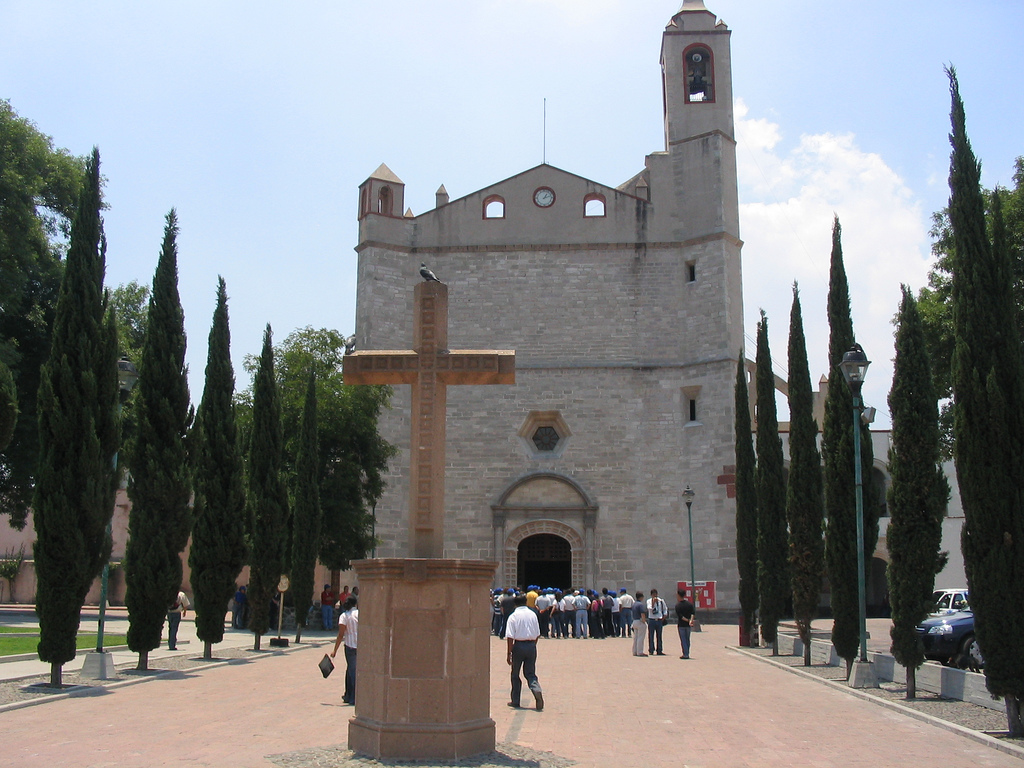
Facade of the parish and former monastery of San José

The city of Tula de Allende was built on what was the southern extension of the ancient city of Tula, centered on a former monastery built by the Spanish in the 16th century. The modern city is still connected to the ancient ruins, as it is an important tourist attraction as well as a symbol of the city, especially the warrior figures located on the Quetzalcoatl pyramid. The modern city is a regional economic center and has been listed as one of the fastest growing in Mexico by the National Commission of Population. Much of the reason for this is the existence of a refinery and a thermoelectric plant. The city is centered around the parish and former monastery of San Jose, with the oldest part built between 1546 and 1556. The main facade has three arches, pilasters with reliefs, a curved pediment, and a chapel annex that takes from the 17th century. The cloister of the monastery has two levels with arches and fresco murals. Inside the main church, a modern mural called "Jesus" is located at the main altar. It was named a cathedral in 1961.

=== Archeological sites ===
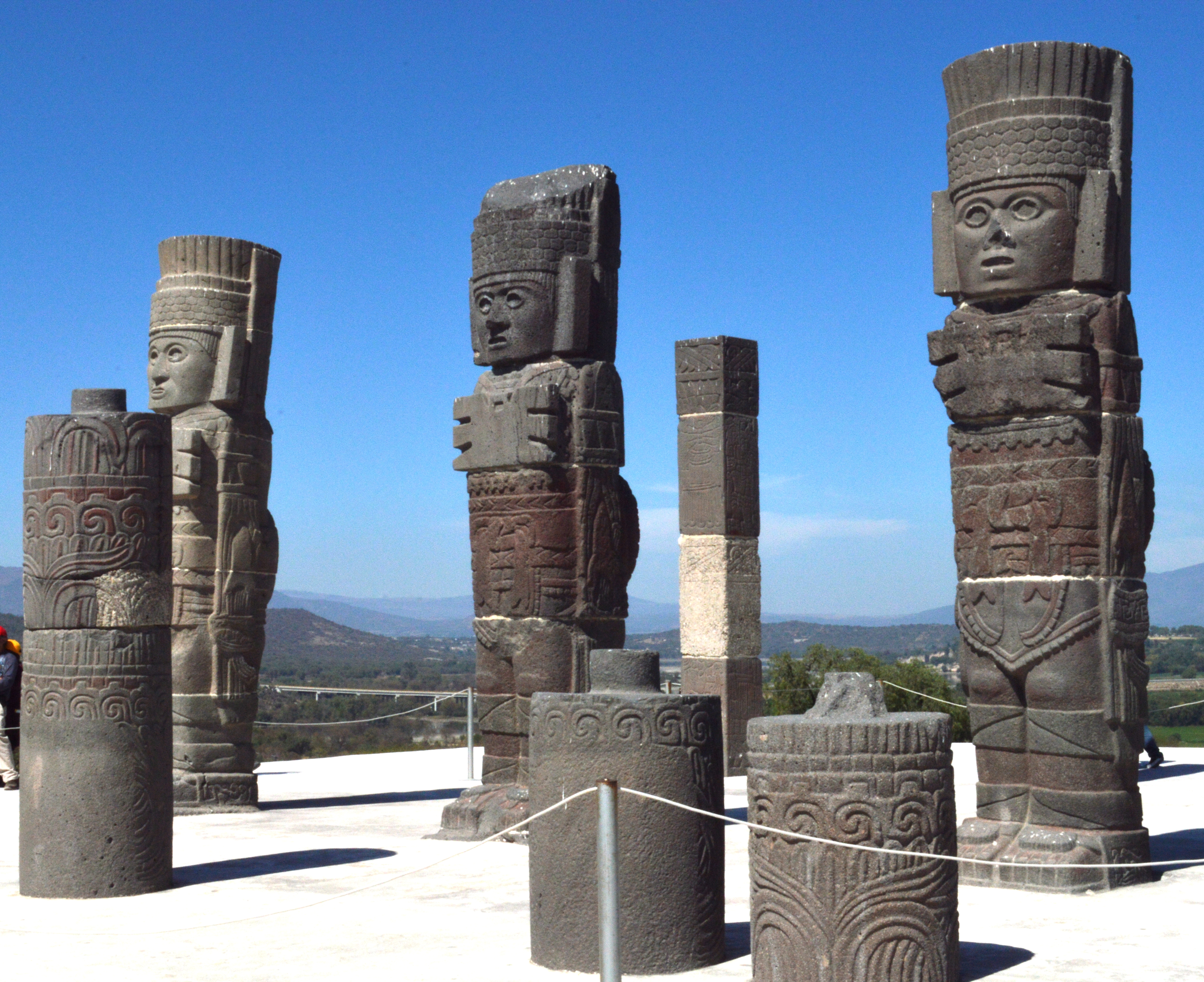
Warrior statue/columns at the Tula archeological site

The most important archeological site of the valley is Tula, although this is overshadowed by its predecessor Teotihuacan and one of its successors, Tenochtitlan. Much of the site's historical importance comes from the fact that its civilization was highly respected by the Aztecs who followed – the Aztecs used the terms "Tula" and "Toltec" to indicate an urban space and a skilled person, respectively.

The modern archaeological site consists of the ceremonial center of Tula Grande, an area called Tula Chico, the Jorge R. Acosta site museum, and the Guadalupe Mastache orientation center. The ceremonial center of the city is located on a limestone outcropping, with steep banks on three sides, making it defensible. War and sacrifice are prominent themes at the site, with images representing warriors such as jaguars and coyotes, as well as eagles eating human hearts. There are also images of serpents eating skeletal figures and skulls in various areas. The major attraction of the site is Pyramid B, also called the Pyramid of Quetzalcoatl or of the Morning Star. It is a five-tiered structure similar to the Temple of the Warriors at Chichen Itza. At the top of Pyramid B are four massive columns, each carved in the likeness of Toltec warriors which once supported the roof of the temple on top of the pyramid. Each warrior figure is of basalt, 4 metres (13 ft) high, with an atlatl or spear thrower, incense, a butterfly-shaped chest plate, and a back plate in the shape of a solar disk.

Another important site is Pañhú, located in the community of La Mesilla in the municipality of Tecozautla. It is a Classic period city which coexisted along with Teotihuacan. However, its architecture is different from that of the larger city, especially the substructure of the main pyramid which is unlike any other in Mesoamerica. This probably means that it was at least semi-autonomous from Teotihuacan. The archeological site was opened to the public in 2012.
