= Pahuayo =

- Interactive map of Pahuayo
- Coordinates: 21°10′24.252″N 98°42′23.661″W
- State: Hidalgo
- Municipality: Tlanchinol

Population (2020)
  - Total: 490
- Time zone: UTC−6
- Postal code: 43168
- Area code: 774

Pahuayo is a locality in Mexico located in the Municipality of Tlanchinol in the state of Hidalgo.

== Geography ==
It is located in the geographic region of the Huasteca Hidalguense. Its coordinates are 21° 10’ 24.252” north latitude and 98° 42’ 23.661” west longitude, with an altitude of 356 meters above sea level. It has a semi-warm humid climate with rains throughout the year.

It is located in the province of the Sierra Madre Oriental, within the sub-province of Huastec Karst; its terrain is mountainous. As for hydrography, it is located in the Pánuco region, within the Moctezuma River basin, and in the Amajac River sub-basin.

== Demographics ==
In 2020, it had a population of 490 people, which corresponds to 1.30% of the municipal population. Of these, 234 are men and 256 are women.

Historical population

Year	Pop.	±%
1960	376	—
1970	250	−33.5%
1980	434	+73.6%

Year	Pop.	±%
1990	477	+9.9%
1995	471	−1.3%
2000	478	+1.5%

Year	Pop.	±%
2005	585	+22.4%
2010	528	−9.7%
2020	490	−7.2%

Población de los censos y conteos del Instituto Nacional de Estadística y Geografía (INEGI).
