= Ajacuba =

- Town and municipality
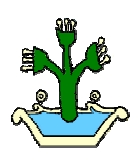
- Coat of arms

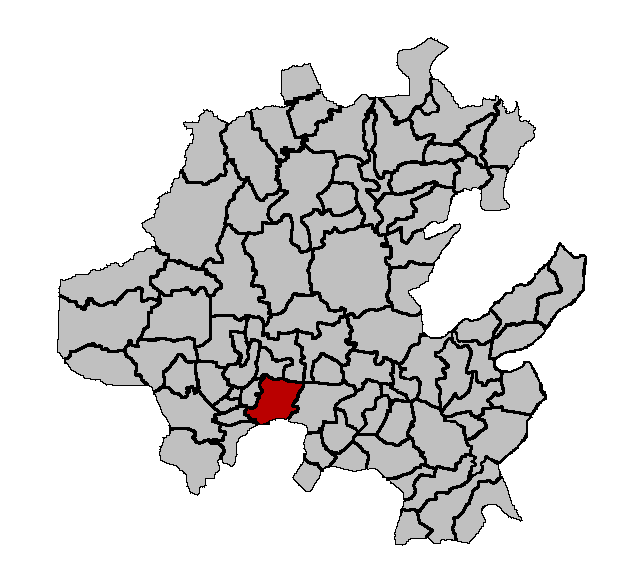

- Location in Mexico
- Coordinates: 20°05′N 99°07′W
- Country: Mexico
- State: Hidalgo
- Municipality: Ajacuba

Government
  - Federal electoral district: Hidalgo's 6th

Area
  - Total: 192.7 km^{2} (74.4 sq mi)

Population (2020)
  - Total: 18,872
- Time zone: UTC-6 (Zona Centro)
- Website: municipioajacuba.gob.mx

Ajacuba is a town and one of the 84 municipalities of Hidalgo, in central Mexico. The municipality covers an area of 192.7 km^{2} (74.4 sq mi).

As of 2005, the municipality's population was 16,111.

== Geography ==
It is located between the parallels 99° 27’ 51” and 99° 07’ 32” west longitude, and 20° 05’ 35” and 18° 55’ 22” north latitude. Ajacuba borders. It covers a total surface area of 192.7 km^{2} (74.4 sq mi) at an altitude of 6,634 ft. In the year 2010 census by INEGI, it reported a population of 17,055.

The town of Ajacuba, as the municipal seat, has governing jurisdiction over the following communities: Santiago Tezontlale, Vicente Guerrero, Tecomatlan, and Tulancalco. The total municipality extends 96.37 and borders with the municipalities of Tetepango, San Agustín Tlaxiaca, Atitalaquia, Atotonilco de Tula, Progreso de Obregón and the state of México (Hueypoxtla and Apaxco).

The municipal seat is in a small, elongated valley but most of the municipality is inside of the Mezquital Valley. The highest mountain the Picacho in the Sierra Tezontlalpa, it rises 2,800 metres (9,200 ft) above sea level, on the border between the municipalities of San Agustín Tlaxiaca and Atitalaquia.

=== Climate ===
Climate data for Ajacuba
Month	Jan	Feb	Mar	Apr	May	Jun	Jul	Aug	Sep	Oct	Nov	Dec	Year
Mean daily maximum °C (°F)	24.1 (75.4)	24.4 (75.9)	26.2 (79.2)	27.1 (80.8)	27.3 (81.1)	26 (79)	25 (77)	25.6 (78.1)	24.5 (76.1)	24.4 (75.9)	23.7 (74.7)	24.2 (75.6)	25.2 (77.4)
Mean daily minimum °C (°F)	7.7 (45.9)	8.2 (46.8)	9.5 (49.1)	10.9 (51.6)	11 (52)	11.2 (52.2)	10.9 (51.6)	11.0 (51.8)	10.4 (50.7)	10 (50)	8.6 (47.5)	8.6 (47.5)	9.8 (49.6)
Average precipitation mm (inches)	10 (0.4)	10 (0.4)	10 (0.4)	30 (1.2)	36 (1.4)	76 (3)	84 (3.3)	71 (2.8)	74 (2.9)	28 (1.1)	10 (0.4)	2.5 (0.1)	440 (17.3)
Source: Weatherbase

== Tourism ==
Ajacuba is a tourist destination, with 6 balnearios: "Ejidal Las Lumbreras", "Ajacuba", "La Carreta", "Los Arcos", "El Sol" and "Los Toboganes". The people who visit Ajacuba usually eat the regional dishes such as barbacoa, tlacoyos, tacos, etc.

== Demography ==
=== Populated places in Ajacuba ===
Town	Population
Total	
Ajacuba	
Santiago Tezontlale	
Tulancalco	
San Nicolás Tecomatlán	

== See also ==
- 2021 Tula River floods
