= José Luis Romo Martín =

- Born: April 19, 1954; Chilcuautla, Mexico
- Died: May 22, 2016 (aged 62); Santiago de Querétaro, Mexico
- Education: Escuela Nacional de Pintura, Escultura y Grabado "La Esmeralda"
- Known for: "Pintor Otomi. Indigenous Mexican Artist"
- Style: Surrealism

José Luis Romo Martín (April 19, 1954 – May 22, 2016) was a Mexican painter, sculptor and graphic artist of Otomi -Hñäñhü- heritage.

== Influence ==
Gunther Gerzso was his mentor and influenced his life and work. The inspiration of Maria Izquierdo, Rufino Tamayo and Frida Kahlo is noticeable.

== Style ==
The chromatic scale that Romo favors is a combination of siennas and ochres with greenish blues. These last often bristle against burnt greens, colors close to grass or wet fields. The touches of red are almost always restricted to areas where blood appears. They are measured in such a way as to accrete value to mixed colors, such as Indian red or pink, without competing with them.

Romo's iconography alludes to images of childhood, to his birthplace in Valle del Mezquital and to recent events, whether related to his life or to his personal environment. A reference might be construed by way of its opposite, as in Mezquital there is no water or greenery, and the absence is substituted by presence. Other times the evocation is direct, as with figures and objects that recall the car crash the artist had in 1981 or the landscape in which his house appears with a cactus in the foreground. This is his only picture that lacks fantasy elements, although symbols are still present.

The genre of naturalistic painting is defined in relation to genres it most resembles. Romo doesn't introduce inadmissible, inexplicable or mysterious elements, but he does introduce categories that leave any descriptive context and possess allegorical, emblematic or commemorative meanings. Thus, it can be affirmed that his fantasy is expressed in suprareal or fantastic terms. Instead, he transforms the vision of daily life into a search for poetic fidelity for images and pictorial concepts of personal significance to the artist.

== Career ==
In 1978 he became the exhibit coordinator at the Instituto Politécnico Nacional, where he was attending.

Romo founded the Ixmiquilpan Culture House and he devoted years to teaching painting in the Otomí community. He showed his work at different galleries in Mexico City such as Galeria de Arte Mexicano, Galeria Lopez Quiroga, Palacio de Bellas Artes, MARCO in Monterrey N.L Mexico, and Mary-Anne Martin/Fine Art New York.

He was awarded scholarships from Consejo Estatal para la Cultura y las Artes de Querétaro, Consejo Estatal para la Cultura y las Artes de Nayarit, Secretaria de Hacienda y Crédito Público, and from the University of Dallas in Texas.

Auction houses like Christie's, Sotheby's, Skinner Inc, Bonhams Los Angeles and Morton Casa de Subastas in Mexico City had been bidding his artwork.

== Recognition ==
- First place at the Aguascalientes Arts Contest
- Honorific prize at the IV Ibero-American Art Biennial of the Instituto Cultural Domecq.
- Premio Estatal de Artes Visuales del Festival Amado Nervo 2009 by Museo Emilio Ortiz at Tepic, Nayarit.

== Works ==
1. Resistencia Otomí / Jacques and Natasha Gelman Collection
2. Autorretrato 1987/ Permanent Collection. The Metropolitan Museum of Art. NY
3. Illustrations for Don Quixote for Children. Edición trilingüe otomí-español-inglés. Using leaves of the maguey. 2015

== Collective ==
- Europalia 93 PMMK - Museum voor Moderne Kunst, Oostende. Belgium 1993.
- "Pintores Latinoamericanos", North America Smithsonian Institution, 1995.
- "Pintores y Escultores Mexicanos" Galeria de Arte Mexicano, 1996.
- "Frida Kahlo, Diego Rivera and Mexican Modernism" SFNOMA San Francisco Museum of Modern Art. 1996.
- Art Museum of South Texas, 1997.
- "Landscape of the American" Gibbes Museum of Art, 1998.
- "Mexico Eterno, Arte y Permanencia" Museo del Palacio de Bellas Artes. Mexico 2000.
- "Centenario de Frida Kahlo" Walker Art Center, Minneapolis.
- Philadelphia Museum of Art
- San Francisco Museum of Modern Art, 2007
