= Amajac =

Amajac may refer to:

- Amajac River, a river of central−eastern Mexico
- Hidalgo Amajac, a town in Álamo, Veracruz, Mexico
  - The Young Woman of Amajac, a pre-Hispanic sculpture discovered in the town
- Amajac (Mexico City Metrobús, Line 4), a BRT station in Mexico City renamed after the sculpture
- Amajac (Mexico City Metrobús, Line 7), a BRT station in Mexico City renamed after the sculpture
