= Huitexcalco =

- Town
- Location within Hidalgo Location within Mexico
- Coordinates: 20°15′55″N 99°16′53″W
- Country: Mexico
- State: Hidalgo
- Municipality: Chilcuautla

Area
  - Total: 159.3 km^{2} (61.5 sq mi)

Population (2020)
  - Total: 1,003
- Time zone: UTC-06:00 (Central)
- Postal code: 42753
- Area code: 738

Huitexcalco is a locality in Mexico belonging to the municipality of Chilcuautla in the state of Hidalgo.

== Geography ==
It is located in the region of the Mezquital Valley at an altitude of 2095 m. It is located 9.73 km from the municipal seat at Chilcuautla.

== Demographic ==
In 2020, it registered a population of 1003 people, accounting for 5.30% of the total population of the municipality, of whom 486 are men and 517 are women. It has 281 inhabited private homes.

Population distribution
Year	Men	Women	Total
2010	421	439	860
2020	486	517	1003

== Economy ==
The town has a high degree of marginalization and a low degree of social backwardness.

== See also ==
- Mezquital Valley
- Localities of the municipality of Chilcuautla
