= Santiago Apóstol Parish (Atotonilco de Tula) =

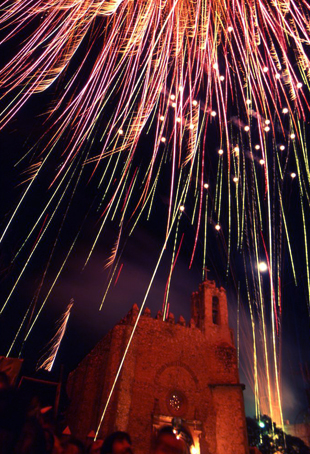
- Santiago Apóstol Parish
- 20°16′06″N 98°56′35″W
- Location: Atotonilco de Tula
- Country: Mexico
- Denomination: Roman Catholic

History
- Status: Parish
- Consecrated: 1609

Santiago Apóstol Parish is the Catholic church and parish house of the people of Atotonilco de Tula. Has always belonged to the Diocese of Tula in Mexico.
