= Hacienda Demiñho =

- Abandoned Spanish plantation
- Hacienda San José Demiñho
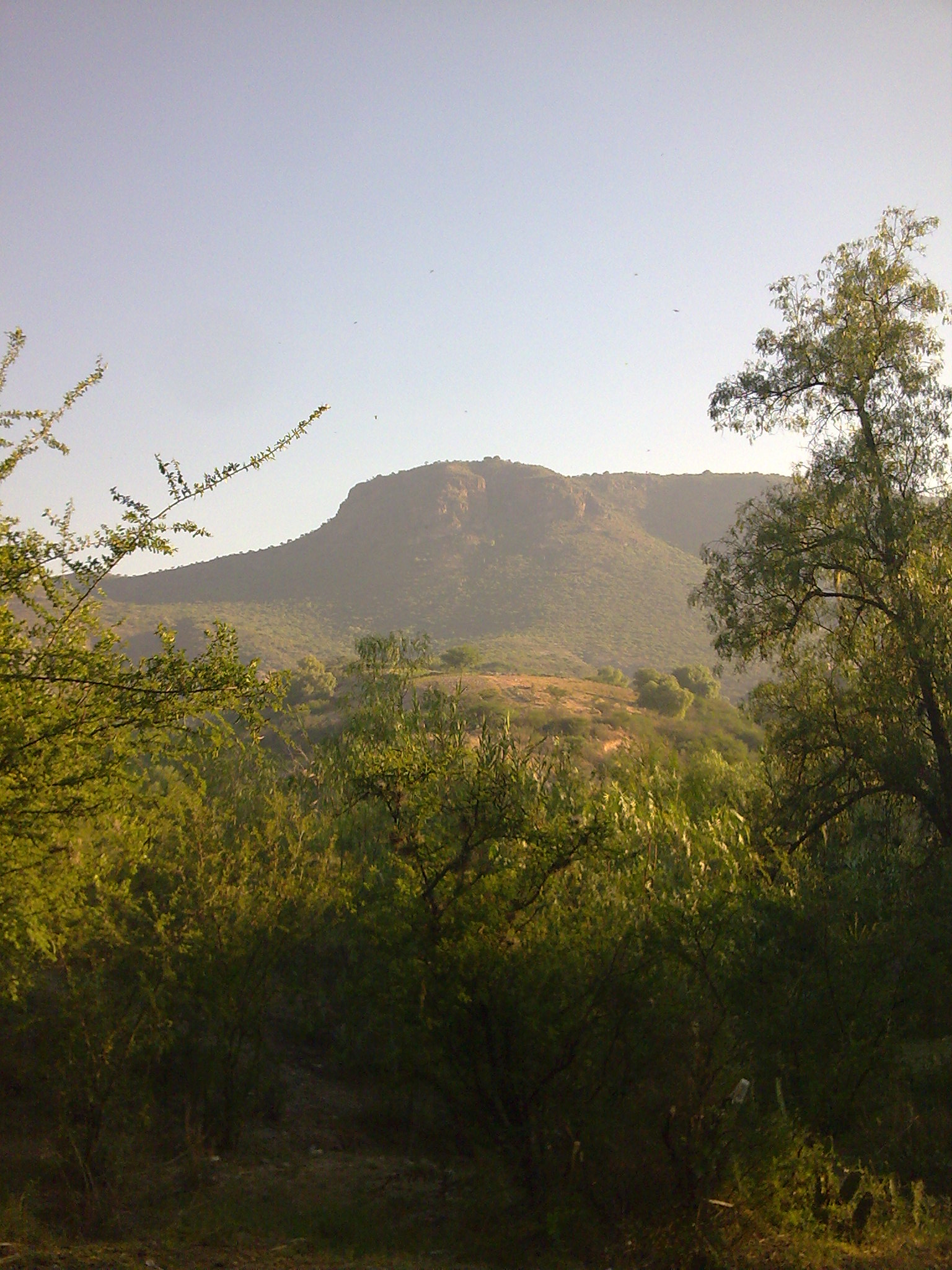
- Elephant Hill, part of Hacienda Demiñho
- Etymology: Of the Coyote; Pass of the Coyote

- Location within Hidalgo Location within Mexico
- Coordinates (Hacienda's manor): 20°14′34″N 99°14′34″W
- Country: Mexico
- Mexican States: Hidalgo
- Municipalities: Chilcuautla
- Royal appropriation: 1580
- Royal property grant (merced): November 1581
- "Estancia" (Spanish ranching estate): 1603
- Hacienda (Spanish plantation): 1611
- Destroyed during Mexican Revolution: 1919
- Founder: Juan González Soto
- Elevation: 1,991 m (6,532 ft)
- Time zone: UTC−6 (CST)
  - Summer (DST): UTC−5 (CDT)

Hacienda Demiñho (also known as Deminyo) is located near Tunititlán in the Chilcuautla municipality in the state of Hidalgo in central Mexico. An extensive former Spanish plantation, it relied on cattle ranching, agriculture production, and property rental to become one of the most important haciendas in the Mezquital Valley region. Following its destruction during the Mexican Revolution, it is no longer in use. Today, farmers use the manor's abandoned ruins to store their agricultural items and local municipal authorities use it as a makeshift site for cultural events.

== Toponymy ==
The name Demiñho is a term in Otomi language. Demiñho means "of the Coyote" or "pass of the Coyote". It comes from the word min'yō which means coyote. It refers to the mountain which is the main geographical feature of the site. Another translation of Demiñho is "In the middle of spiny small reeds", derived from the Otomi words nde (center or half), 'mini (spine), and 'yo (small reed).

In various colonial documents the hacienda's name appears as "De minyo", "de Minyo", "Deminyo", or "Demiño".

== History ==
=== Land appropriation ===
After the Spanish conquest of the Aztec Empire, in 1580 the Spanish Crown began a series of land appropriations in the region to grant Spanish people merced, royal property grants. In November 1581 the first merced (intended for equestrian facilities) was made to Nicolás de Covarrubias, a Spaniard, by order of Lorenzo Suárez de Mendoza, 5th Count of Coruña, viceroy of New Spain. In 1589 a merced was granted, by Álvaro Manrique de Zúñiga, 1st Marquess of Villamanrique, viceroy of New Spain, to Juan Martín Murillo, a Spaniard, to be used for cattle ranching. Nicolás de Covarrubias sold his merced to Juan Martín Murillo, merging both properties. When Juan Martín Murillo died, the Murillo family sold their property to Gonzalo Pérez de Ajacuba, a Spaniard, in 1593. Luis de Velasco, 1st Marquess of Salinas del Río Pisuerga, viceroy of New Spain granted a merced to Juan Baptista Michel, chief constable of the Zimapan mines, for the purpose of ranching 2,000 head of cattle, effectively taking the lands of the towns of Tunititlán and Texcatepec. This new land was officially possessed in 1594 by lieutenant mayor of Chilcuautla Pedro de Vargas. A month later Juan Baptista Michel sold his land to Gonzalo Pérez, a Spaniard. In October 1603 Gaspar de Zúñiga, 5th Count of Monterrey, viceroy of New Spain, granted a merced of the lands between Chilcuautla and Texcatepec to Gaspar López to be used for cattle ranching and equestrian facilities. A month later, Gaspar López sold his land to Gonzalo Pérez.

=== Estancia ===
With the merging of properties bought by Gonzalo Pérez and additional land bought in 1603 near the Atengo-Mixquiahuala corregimiento, Pérez built houses, corrals, and barns, officially founding the Estancia of Demiñho, royal assent given in representation by Diego de las Ruelas, mayor of Ixmiquilpan, and Luis de Hurtado, lieutenant mayor of Chilcuautla. European seeds were introduced to Demiñho at the time for agricultural purposes as well as a wider variety of European cattle. In 1611, Gonzalo Pérez sold the property to his son-in-law Juan González Soto.

=== Hacienda ===
With the newly acquired property and lands, later in 1611 Juan González Soto officially established the Hacienda Demiñho, a Spanish plantation. In 1620, Pablo Vargas Verdugo sold to Juan González Soto the Estancia Tenayahualco located in Chilcuautla. In 1629, Juan González Soto bought a vast territory known as Ayutlan from Alonso Pérez Bocanegra. Given the substantial revenue generated from Hacienda Demiñho, Juan González Soto established two sister haciendas of Demiñho: Hacienda Doica-Xidoo (also known just as Xido) and Hacienda La Viña. In 1645, Juan González Soto died and his eldest son, Miguel Gonzáles Soto, inherited the authority to retain or distribute the property and its earnings. In 1654, Miguel Gonzáles Soto sold Hacienda Demiñho to his sister, Martha Gonzáles Soto.

On April 23, 1673, Martha Gonzáles Soto and her husband Juan López de las Ruelas took a loan of 1575 pesos from Juan Chavarria Valera, owner of Hacienda Ulapa. As the credit increased and as it became impossible to fulfill payment in full within a 10-year term, in accordance with the loan contract, Hacienda Demiñho became the property of Juan Chavarria Valera. When Juan Chavarria Valera died, the estate was put up for sale.

In April 1688, Pedro de Lugo, a Spaniard, bought Hacienda Demiñho for 13,000 pesos. Pedro de Lugo renamed the hacienda "San José" (Saint Joseph) with a solemn ceremony. In 1689, Pedro de Lugo built a bullpen, two corrals, a chicken coop, two warehouses, a barn, a cemetery, a brand-new office, and a niche made of cantera where a statue of Saint Joseph was adored and Catholic masses were celebrated. By 1690, Hacienda Demiñho was considered the most important hacienda in the entire region.

By 1782, the owner of Hacienda Demiñho was Nicolás de la Puente García, who took out a loan of 20,000 pesos, pledging the hacienda as collateral. On October 26, 1783, Nicolás de la Puente García died, prompting the lender, Fondo Piadoso de las Californias, to seize the property. The lender's administrator, Francisco de Sales Carrillo, ordered Hacienda Demiñho's administrator, Bernardo Mendoza, to audit valuation of the property. Thus, in 1791 Juan Vicente de Güemes, 2nd Count of Revillagigedo, viceroy of New Spain, sold and delivered the hacienda to Manuel Mier de Terán, who was also owner of Hacienda Endoó, diminishing the independence of Hacienda Demiñho as a stand-alone hacienda.

=== Destruction ===
In 1919, as the Mexican Revolution ideals reached the region, Hacienda Demiñho suffered an uprising by its peasants which ended in a violent attack and destruction on the hacienda premises along with the massacre of its owners. This marked the end of Hacienda Demiñho. The ruins of the main manor and church were used by peasants to store their agricultural items and the extensive territory that once belonged to Demiñho was taken by local inhabitants.

Since the early 21st century, the local governments have used the grounds where the ruins remain as centre for makeshift cultural events. The hacienda buildings remain in ruins.

== Architecture ==
The Hacienda Demiñho was built in the Spanish colonial style. Although only ruins remain, there are features which still exist: the main manor, where the owner and his family lived, a church with a tower, a threshing floor, a water reservoir, a sweat bath, and stables. Some walls of the manor still show traces of colonial-style painting and designs.

== Demographics ==
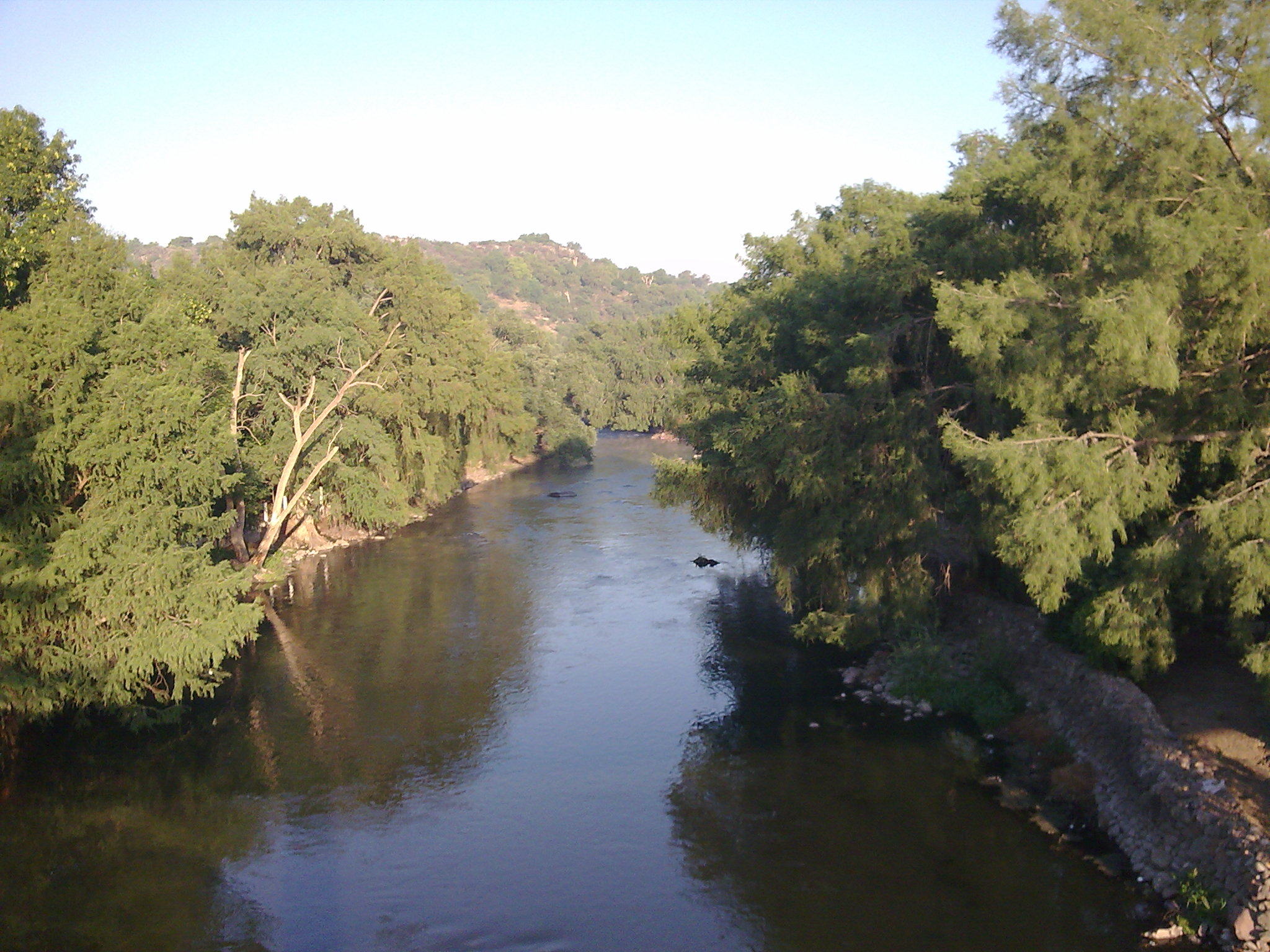
Tula River, southern limit of Hacienda Demiñho

Over the centuries, the Hacienda Demiñho had a considerable number of people working in the manor as well as on the hacienda's land. Additionally, there were those who rented land for agriculture or ranching, living within the domain of the hacienda.

=== Hacendados ===
The owner of the Hacienda Demiñho, which at times was a hacendado (male owner) and at times a hacendada (female owner), lived in the plantation's manor with his or her family. The owner's extended family could also live there, as well as a floating population of the family's friends and guests. Income generated by the hacienda was for the hacendado.

=== Servants ===
In 1783, there were 15 servants who worked for the hacienda's manor. They were registered by the hacienda's administration between June 1, 1782, and November 16, 1783, dates corresponding to a work period in Hacienda Demiñho, although the number of servants reached a maximum of 25 during other work periods.

These servants were people who routinely maintained the hacienda's functioning as well as it security. The positions for Hacienda Demiñho's servants varied and included: cooks, millers, cowboys, foremen, loaders, farmers, grooms, helpers, pasturemen, drivers, water boys, drovers, masons, muleteers and vigilants.

=== Farm laborers ===
During the 18th century there could be up to 309 farm laborers working for Hacienda Demiñho in a work period year.

Agricultural workers for the Hacienda Demiñho, known by the hacienda as gañanes, peones or operarios in the 18th century, worked the land and also performed maintenance needed for such work. Hacienda Demiñho farm laborers came from nearby villages such as Tunititlan, Tesca, and Santa Maria.

These farm workers' job positions included: farm laborers (of maize, chili, barley, and beans), mason workers (to build or maintain barbecue pits, fences, and other farming structures), and barbecue-pit cooks.

=== Tenants ===
In the 1780s there were up to 131 tenants renting land from Hacienda Demiñho.

Tenants used the leased properties for various purposes, including: farming, ranching, farm animal husbandry, extraction of maguey sap, collecting wood, and in some cases to build a place to live.

The cost of the land was fixed but varied according to social and economic status. For example, one of the smallest payments made by Hacienda Demiñho's tenants was by Francisco Martín, an indigenous man from the village of Tesca, who paid 4 reales per year for land for his ox. In contrast, the highest payment recorded for Hacienda Demiñho was by Don Nicolás Pérez, governor of Chilcuautla, who paid 1,120 reales (140 pesos) for the land he worked.

== Bibliography ==
- Velázquez, María del Carmen. La hacienda de señor San José Deminyo, 1780–1784. El Colegio de México, 1988.
- Mazo y Avilés, José del. Plano ignográfico de la hacienda de San José Deminyo, Mixquiahuala, Hidalgo. Created 1786. Published online 2009. Archivo General de la Nación, AGN. Fondo Mapas, Planos e Ilustraciones (MAPILU), Ramo Tierras, Volumen 2413, Expediente 2, Foja 82bis. Plano ignográfico de la hacienda de San José Deminyo. Mixquiahuala. Hidalgo (atribuido)
