= San Miguel Arcangel Parish (Atitalaquia) =

- San Miguel Arcangel Parish
- 20°16′06″N 98°56′35″W
- Location: Atitalaquia
- Country: Mexico
- Denomination: Roman Catholic

History
- Status: Parish
- Consecrated: 1563

San Miguel Arcangel Parish is the Catholic church and parish house of the people of Atitalaquia. Has always belonged to the Diocese of Tula in Mexico.
