= Atotonilco de Tula =

Municipality and city in Hidalgo, Mexico

- City and municipality
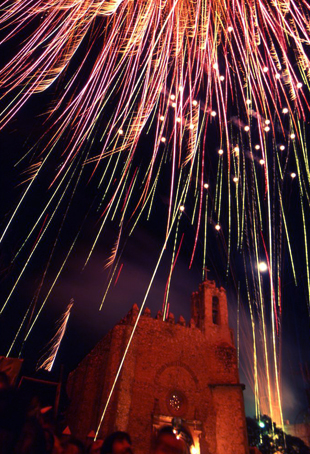

- Coat of arms

- Location within Hidalgo Location within Mexico
- Coordinates: 20°03′N 99°11′W
- Country: Mexico
- State: Hidalgo
- Municipality: Atotonilco de Tula

Government
  - Federal electoral district: Hidalgo's 5th

Area
  - City and municipality: 31 km^{2} (12 sq mi)

Population (2010 census)
  - City and municipality: 31,078
  - Metro: Tula de Allende
- Time zone: UTC-6 (Zona Centro)
- Website: atotonilcodetula.gob.mx

Atotonilco de Tula is a city that serves as the municipal seat for one of the 84 municipalities of Hidalgo. It is located in the southwestern part of the Mexican state of Hidalgo. The municipality lies at a southern pass leading out of the Mezquital Valley, approximately 86 kilometers north of Mexico City and about 180 km northeast of the state capital, Pachuca de Soto.

The name comes from Nahuatl and means "place of hot springs"; in the Otomi language, it is called Padehe. The municipality covers an area of 31 km^{2} (12 sq mi). As of the 2010 census, it had a total population of 31,078. It is now part of the Tula de Allende built-up (or metropolitan) area.

== Geography ==
It is located between the parallels 99° 27’ 51” and 99° 07’ 32” west longitude, and 20° 05’ 35” and 18° 55’ 22” north latitude. Atotonilco borders. It covers a total surface area of 192.7 km^{2} (74.4 sq mi) at an altitude of 6,634 ft. In the year 2010 census by INEGI, it reported a population of 17,055.

The town of Atotonilco de Tula, the municipal seat, has governing jurisdiction over the following communities: Vito, Boxfi, and Progreso. The total municipality extends 96.37 and borders with the municipalities of Tepeji del Río, Tula de Allende, Atitalaquia, Ajacuba and the state of México (Huehuetoca, Tequixquiac and Apaxco).

The municipal seat is in a small, elongated valley but most of the municipality is inside of the Mezquital Valley. The highest mountain the Picacho in the Sierra Tezontlalpa, it rises 2,800 metres (9,200 ft) above sea level, on the border between the municipalities of San Agustín Tlaxiaca and Atitalaquia.

=== Flora & fauna ===
Atotonilco de Tula municipality is a rural territory of Central Mexican Plateau, here there is a diversity in plants and animals of semi-desertic climate (Mezquital Valley).

The native animals are cacomistle, skunk, gopher, bobcat, falcon, Virginia opossum, rabbit, Mexican gray squirrel, turkey, colibri, turkey vulture, northern mockingbird, rattlesnake, pine snake, xincoyote, red warbler, rufous-crowned sparrow, lesser roadrunner, great horned owl, frog, toad, red ant, bee, and others.

== Demography ==
=== Populated places in Atotonilco ===
Town	Population
Total	
Atotonilco de Tula	
Vito	
Progreso	
El Refugio	
Conejos	

== See also ==
- 2021 Tula River floods
