= Zimapán Dam =

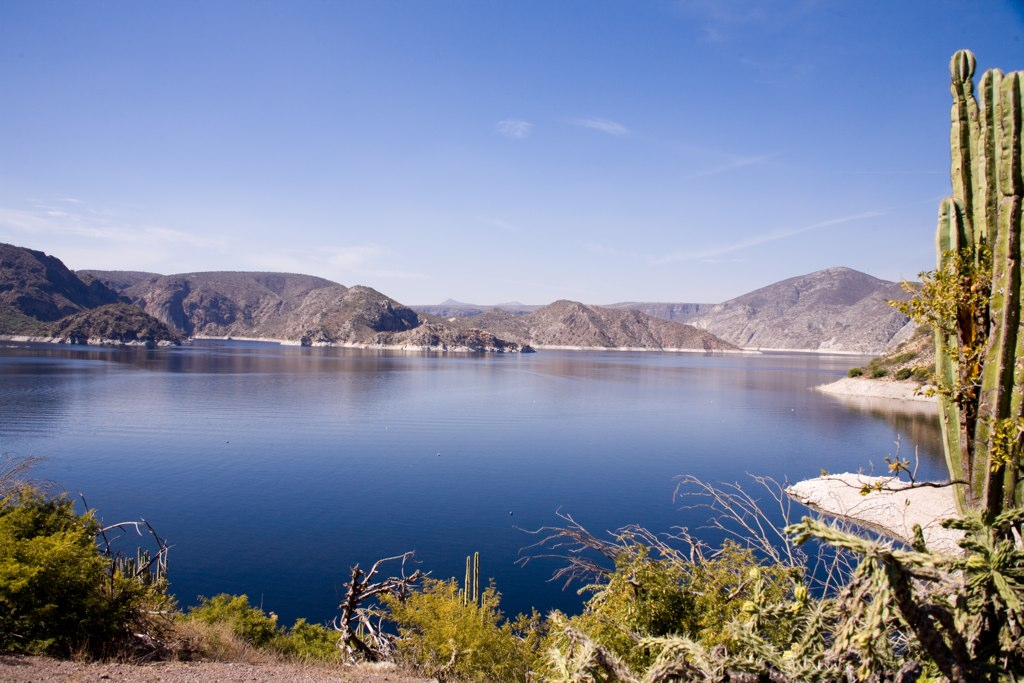
- Reservoir of the Zimapán Dam

- Location within Mexico
- Official name: Presa Zimapán
- Country: Mexico
- Coordinates: 20°39′48″N 99°30′03″W
- Status: Operational
- Construction began: 1990
- Opening date: 1993
- Owner: Federal Electricity Commission

Dam and spillways
- Impounds: Moctezuma River
- Height: 203 m (666 ft)
- Length: 122 m (400 ft)
- Width (crest): 5 m (16 ft)
- Width (base): 22 m (72 ft)

Reservoir
- Inactive capacity: 1,390,000,000 m^{3} (1,126,891 acre⋅ft)
- Surface area: 22.9 km^{2} (9 sq mi)

Zimapán Power Station
- Coordinates: 20°50′51″N 99°27′31″W
- Commission date: 1995
- Turbines: 2 x 146 MW Pelton turbines
- Installed capacity: 292 MW
- Annual generation: 1,064 GWh

The Zimapán Dam, also known as Fernando Hiriart Balderrama Dam, is an arch dam on the Moctezuma River about 15 km (9 mi) southwest of Zimapán in Hidalgo state, Mexico. The primary purpose of the dam is hydroelectric power production and it services a 292 MW power station with water.

== Background ==
The dam was funded in part by a $460 million World Bank loan which was approved on 8 June 1989 and covered the Mexico Hydroelectric Development Project which included the Aguamilpa Dam as well. Mexico raised $250 million in foreign capital as well. Construction on the dam began in 1990 and was complete in 1993. Beginning in 1994, the reservoir filled and the power station was operational by 1995. Approximately 3,000 people were displaced and resettled by the construction of both dams in the Mexico Hydroelectric Development Project.

== Design ==
The dam is a 203 m (666 ft) tall and 122 m (400 ft) long arch-type located in a narrow portion of the Moctezuma Canyon. The crest of the dam is 5 m (16 ft) wide while the base has a width of 22 m (72 ft). The reservoir created by the dam has a capacity of 1,390,000,000 m^{3} (1,126,891 acre⋅ft) and surface area of 22.9 km^{2} (9 sq mi). The reservoir is formed by the Tula and San Juan rivers which join in the reservoir to form the Moctezuma River later downstream of the dam. Water from the reservoir is diverted through a 21 km (13 mi) tunnel, bypassing 42 km (26 mi) of the river downstream, before reaching the power station. Water at the power station powers two Pelton turbine-generators before being discharged back into the Moctezuma River. When both turbines are operating, the power station discharges a maximum of 59 m^{3}/s (2,084 cu ft/s). It operates as a peak power plant, operating 4 to 12 hours a day depending on energy demands.

== See also ==
- List of power stations in Mexico
