= Pahñú =

Archaeological Site in Hidalgo, Mexico

Pahñú or Pañhú
- Location within Mesoamerica
- 20°32′50.96″N 99°38′26.89″W
- Periods: Late Preclassic to Late Classic
- Location: Tecozautla, Hidalgo, Mexico
- Region: Hidalgo

Pahñú (or Pañhú) is an archeological site in Tecozautla, State of Hidalgo. It is a settlement from Xajay culture developed between 300 and 1100 years ago. Apparently it is the heir to the Preclassic period of Chupícuaro culture, in El Bajío, and is related to origin of the Otomis of Mezquital Valley.

== Name ==
The name is from the Otomi language, using two words: pa is hot and hñu is pad or way, said as Hot pad.

== History ==
The archeological site Pañhú was discovered over Hualtepec hill or La Mesilla, near Tecozautla Valley, was an Otomi settlement of Xajay Culture, at the same time as the Teotihuacan Culture.

Work started in 2007 by INAH, and it was open to the public in 2015.

== See also ==
- Mezquital Valley
