= Alfajayucan =

- Town and municipality
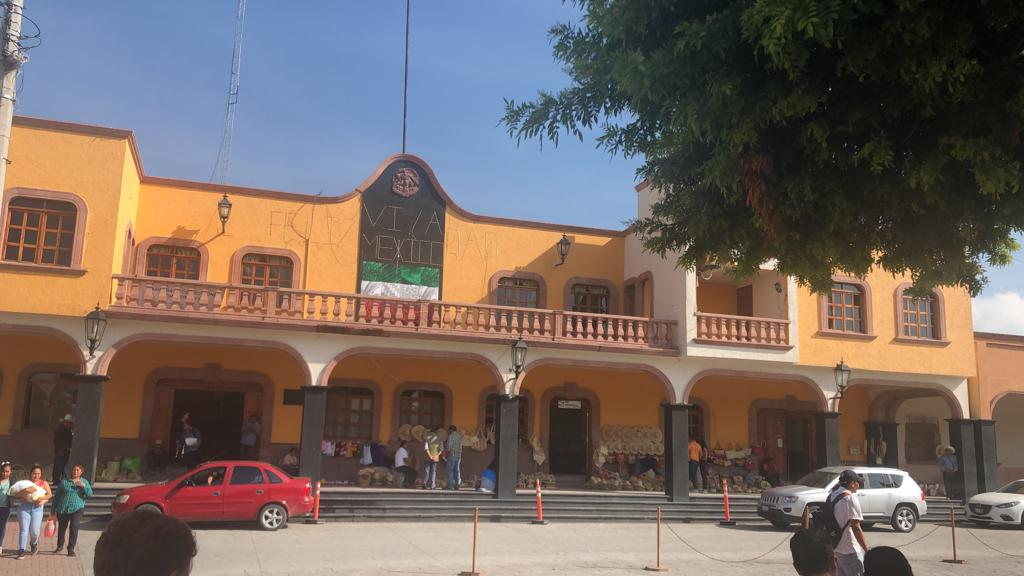
- Alfajayucan Municipal Palace

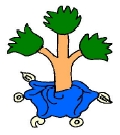
- Coat of arms

- Location within Hidalgo Location within Mexico
- Coordinates: 20°24′N 99°21′W
- Country: Mexico
- State: Hidalgo
- Municipality: Alfajayucan

Government
  - Federal electoral district: Hidalgo's 2nd

Area
  - Total: 467.7 km^{2} (180.6 sq mi)

Population (2005)
  - Total: 16,859
- Time zone: UTC-6 (Zona Centro)
- Website: alfajayucan.hidalgo.gob.mx

Alfajayucan (Otomi: Nxamti) is a town and one of the 84 municipalities of Hidalgo, in central-eastern Mexico. The town serves as the municipal seat for the surrounding municipality, which covers an area of 467.7 km^{2} (180.6 sq mi).

As of 2005, the municipality had a total population of 16,859. In 2017 there were 4,342 inhabitants who spoke an indigenous language, primarily Mezquital Otomi.

== See also ==
- 2021 Tula River floods
