= Amajac River =

Coordinates: 21°15′8″N 98°46′52″W

Location
- Country: Mexico

The Amajac River is a river of central−eastern Mexico.

== Geography ==
It flows through Hidalgo and San Luis Potosí states.

In San Luis Potosí it joins the Moctezuma River at Tamazunchale. The Moctezuma is a tributary of the Pánuco River and Gulf of Mexico.

== See also ==
- List of rivers of Mexico
- Tributaries of the Pánuco River
