= Moctezuma River =

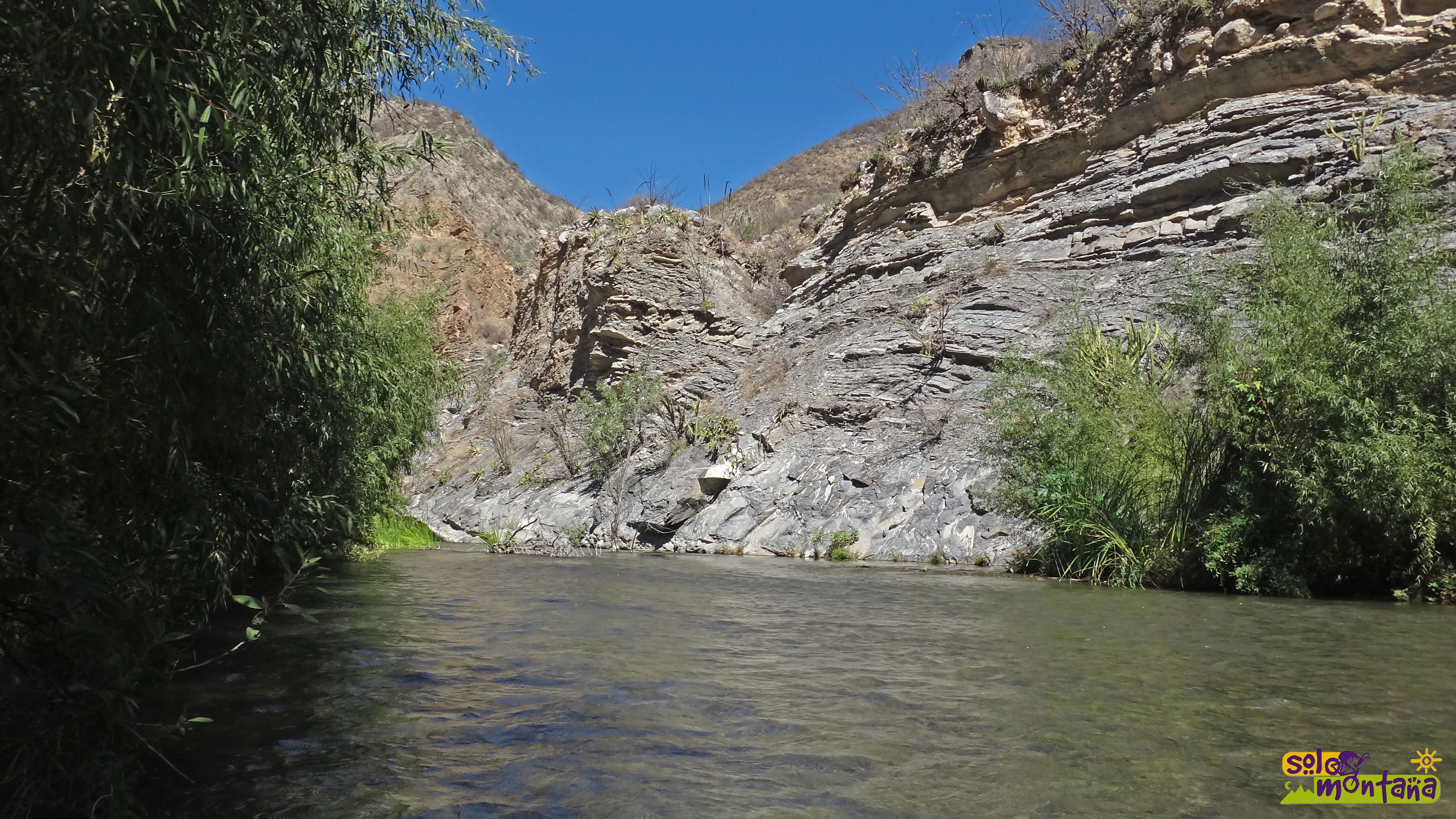

Location
- Country: Mexico

Physical characteristics
- Mouth
  - location: Pánuco River 21°58′03″N 98°33′47″W

The Moctezuma River (Río Moctezuma) is a river in Mexico that drains the eastern side of the Trans-Mexican Volcanic Belt (Sierra Nevada). It is a tributary of the Pánuco River and flows through the Mexican states of Hidalgo, Querétaro, and San Luis Potosí.

== Course ==
The Moctezuma arises in the Zimapán Dam, this reservoir is formed by the Tula and San Juan rivers which join in the reservoir to form the Moctezuma River later downstream of the dam. The Zimapán Dam, is a hydroelectric dam about 15 km southwest of the town of Zimapán. At Tamazunchale it receives the Amajac River. Below the town of Tanquián de Escobedo it forms the border between the states of San Luis Potosí and Veracruz. It receives the Tempoal River at El Higo. It ends at its confluence with the Tamuín River (Tampaón River) where together they form the Pánuco River.

== See also ==
- Tributaries of the Pánuco River
- List of rivers of Mexico

== Notes and references ==
Sources

- Atlas of Mexico, 1975 (https://www.webcitation.org/689BebJNR?url=http://www.lib.utexas.edu/maps/atlas_mexico/river_basins.jpg).
- The Prentice Hall American World Atlas, 1984.
- Rand McNally, The New International Atlas, 1993.
