= Tula River =

Coordinates: 20°35′02″N 99°19′43″W

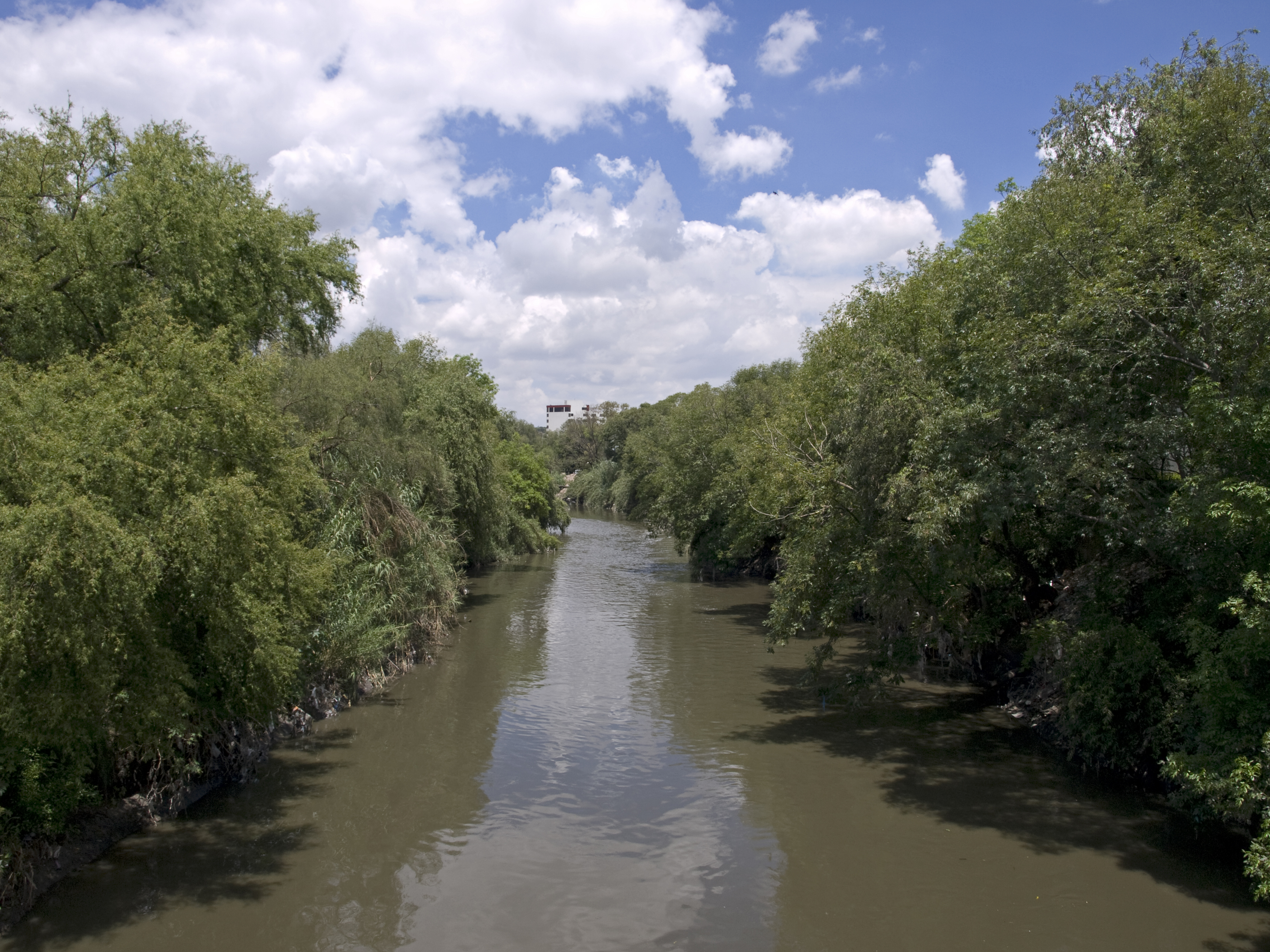
Tula River in Tula de Allende.

The Tula River (Spanish: Río Tula) is a river in Hidalgo State in central Mexico, and a tributary of the Moctezuma River.

== Geography ==
It runs through the city of Tula de Allende and begins as a drainage channel for the Valley of Mexico, which contains the metropolitan Mexico City region.

The Moctezuma River is a tributary of the Pánuco River.

=== Organic and Inorganic Life ===
The river is significantly contaminated with both organic and inorganic substances. Tilapia caught from the Tula river contain levels of lead that greatly exceed the established safety limits for consumption. Unusually high levels of cadmium, arsenic and lead were found in samples of Tula zooplankton.

== See also ==
- 2021 Tula River floods
