= Chilcuautla =

- Town and municipality
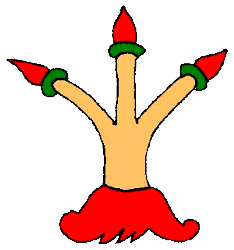
- Coat of arms

- Location within Hidalgo Location within Mexico
- Coordinates: 20°20′N 99°14′W
- Country: Mexico
- State: Hidalgo
- Municipality: Chilcuautla

Government
  - Federal electoral district: Hidalgo's 2nd

Area
  - Total: 231.3 km^{2} (89.3 sq mi)

Population (2005)
  - Total: 15,284
- Time zone: UTC-6:00 (Central)
- Website: chilcuautla.hidalgo.gob.mx

Chilcuautla (Otomi: ʼMiza) is a town and one of the 84 municipalities of Hidalgo, in central-eastern Mexico. The municipality covers an area of 231.3 km^{2} (89.3 sq mi).

As of 2005, the municipality had a total population of 15,284. In 2017 there were 6,915 inhabitants who spoke an indigenous language, primarily Mezquital Otomi.

== Culture ==
The Hacienda Demiñho ruins is on the road that connects Tezontepec de Aldama with Tunititlán. It is semi-abandoned and in ruins. Some of the spaces are used to store fodder and as a barn by the people of the region. It has a great aesthetic value that can be seen in the main nave of the chapel and its bell tower with a conical body and a destroyed altar in the front wall.

== See also ==
- 2021 Tula River floods
