= Tezontepec de Aldama =

- Town and municipality
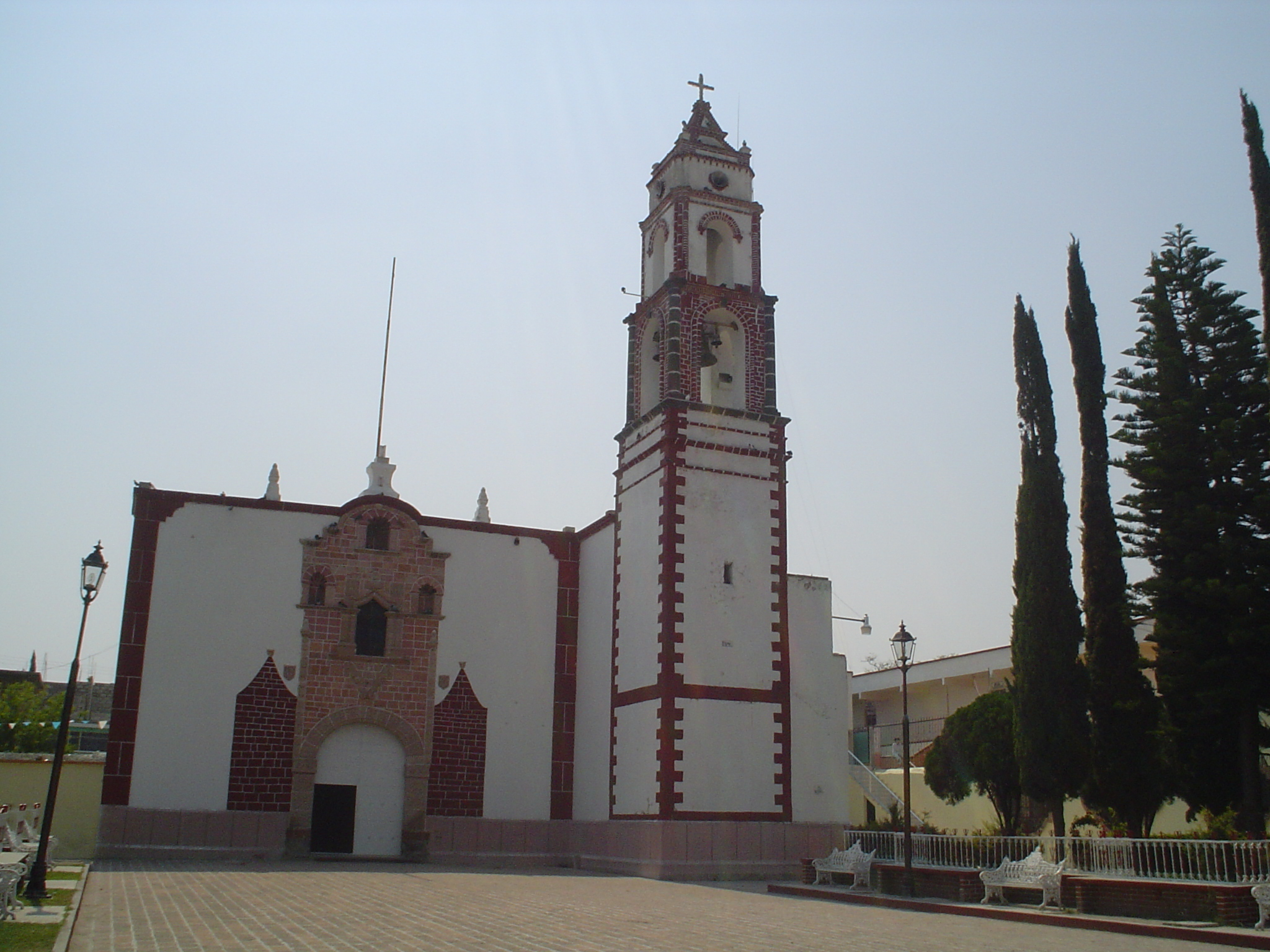
- Church of Saint John the Baptist (C.16th)

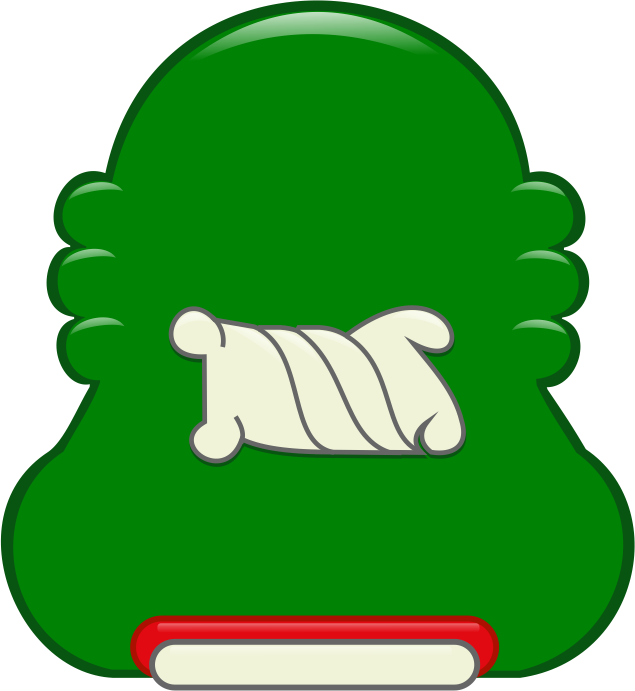
- Coat of arms

- Location within Hidalgo Location within Mexico
- Coordinates: 19.88°N 98.82°W
- Country: Mexico
- State: Hidalgo
- Municipality: Tezontepec de Aldama

Government
  - Federal electoral district: Hidalgo's 5th

Area
  - Total: 133.6 km^{2} (51.6 sq mi)

Population (2005)
  - Total: 10,723
- Time zone: UTC-6 (Zona Centro)
- Website: tezontepec.gob.mx

Tezontepec de Aldama is a town and one of the 84 municipalities of Hidalgo, in central-eastern Mexico.

The municipality covers an area of 133.6 km^{2} (51.6 sq mi) and, as of 2005, had a total population of 10,723. It was raised to municipal status in 1869.

The name "Tezontepec" contains the Nahuatl words tetzontli (tezontle, a reddish volcanic rock) and tepetl (hill), while "de Aldama" commemorates Independence War hero Juan Aldama.

== See also ==
- 2021 Tula River floods
