= Tetepango =

- Municipality and town
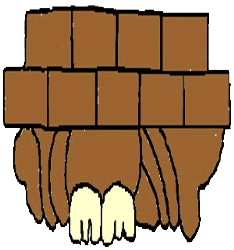
- Coat of arms

- Location in Mexico Tetepango (Mexico)
- Coordinates: 20°06′38″N 99°09′11″W
- Country: Mexico
- State: Hidalgo
- Municipal seat: Tetepango

Area
  - Total: 56.5 km^{2} (21.8 sq mi)
- Time zone: UTC-6 (Central)

Tetepango is a town and one of the 84 municipalities of Hidalgo, in central-eastern Mexico. The municipality covers an area of 56.5 km^{2} (21.8 sq mi).

As of 2005, the municipality had a total population of 9,697.
