= Atitalaquia =

- Town and municipality
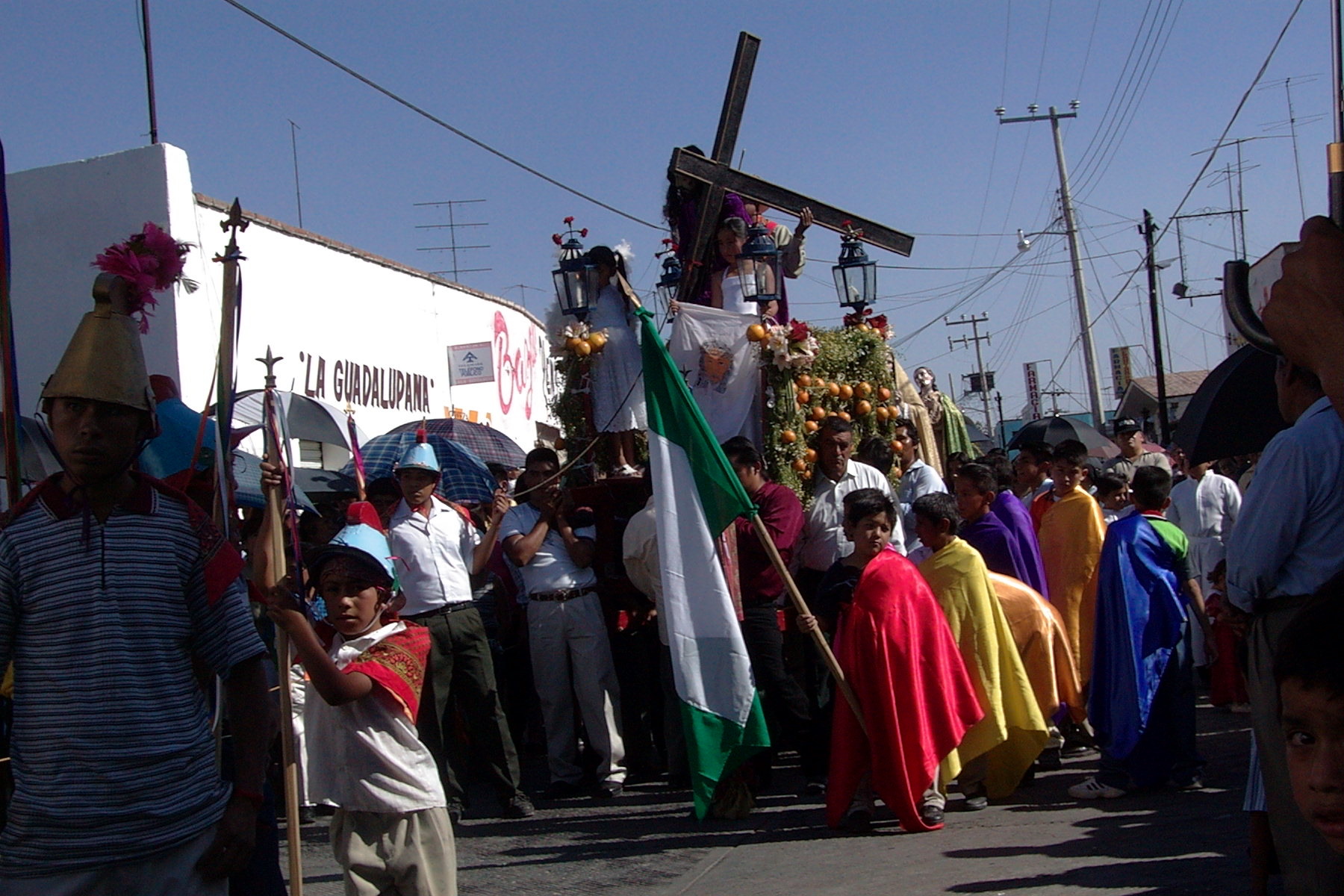
- Good Friday procession in Atitalaquia, 2002

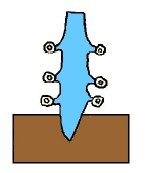
- Coat of arms

- Location within Hidalgo Location within Mexico
- Coordinates: 20°03′30″N 99°13′15″W
- Country: Mexico
- State: Hidalgo
- Municipality: Atitalaquia

Government
  - Federal electoral district: Hidalgo's 5th

Area
  - Town and municipality: 64.2 km^{2} (24.8 sq mi)

Population (2010 census)
  - Town and municipality: 26,904
  - Metro: Tula de Allende
- Time zone: UTC-6 (Zona Centro)
- Website: atitalaquia.gob.mx

Atitalaquia is a town and one of the 84 municipalities of Hidalgo, in central-eastern Mexico. The municipality covers an area of 64.2 km^{2} (24.8 sq mi).

As of 2010 census, the municipality had a total population of 26,749. Atitalaquia is now part of the Tula de Allende built-up area and while urbanization is still growing, about to be included in Mexico City Metro Area.

== Demography ==
=== Populated places in Atitalaquia ===
Town	Population
Total	
Atitalaquia	
Tlalminulpa	

== See also ==
- San Miguel Arcangel Parish (Atitalaquia)
