= Carminatia alvarezii =

Scientific classification
- Kingdom: Plantae
- Clade: Tracheophytes
- Clade: Angiosperms
- Clade: Eudicots
- Clade: Asterids
- Order: Asterales
- Family: Asteraceae
- Genus: Carminatia
- Species: C. alvarezii

Binomial name
- Carminatia alvarezii Rzed. & Calderón

Synonyms
- Carminatia anomala B.L.Turner

Species of flowering plant

Carminatia alvarezii is a Mexican species of annual plants in the family Asteraceae.

Carminatia alvarezii is found in San Luis Potosí, Querétaro, Puebla, Oaxaca, México State, and Hidalgo.
