= Quercus similis =

Conservation status
- Least Concern (IUCN 3.1)

Scientific classification
- Kingdom: Plantae
- Clade: Embryophytes
- Clade: Tracheophytes
- Clade: Spermatophytes
- Clade: Angiosperms
- Clade: Eudicots
- Clade: Rosids
- Order: Fagales
- Family: Fagaceae
- Genus: Quercus
- Subgenus: Quercus subg. Quercus
- Section: Quercus sect. Quercus
- Species: Q. similis

Binomial name
- Quercus similis Ashe
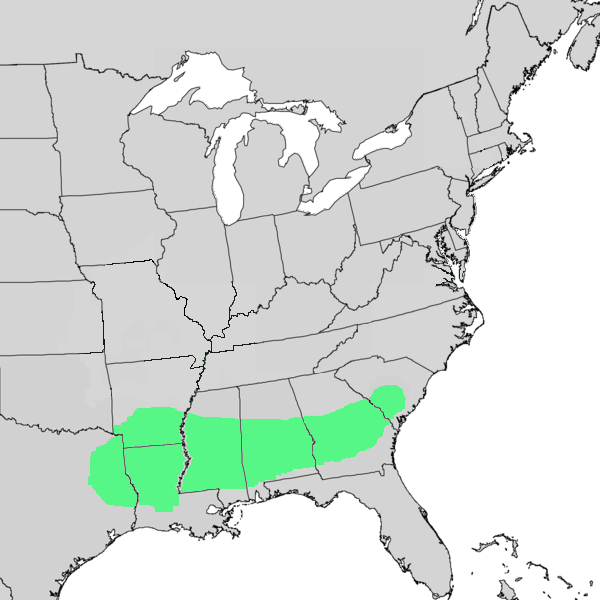

Synonyms
- List: Quercus ashei Sterrett; Quercus margarettae var. paludosa (Sarg.) Ashe; Quercus mississippiensis Ashe; Quercus stellata var. attenuata Sarg.; Quercus stellata var. mississippiensis (Ashe) Little; Quercus stellata subsp. paludosa (Sarg.) A.E.Murray; Quercus stellata var. paludosa Sarg.; Quercus stellata var. similis (Ashe) Sudw.

Species of oak tree

Quercus similis, the swamp post oak or bottomland post oak, is an oak species native to the southeastern and south-central United States. The greatest concentration of populations is in Louisiana and Arkansas, Mississippi, and eastern Texas, with isolated population in Missouri, Alabama, and the Coastal Plain of Georgia and South Carolina.

Quercus similis is a deciduous tree up to 25 meters (82 feet) tall. It has a straight trunk. The bark is brown and flaky. The branches are gray, and between 2 and 3 millimeters (1/16 and 1/8 inch) in diameter. The leaves are between 8 and 12 centimeters (3 and 4 1/2 in) long and 5 to 8 cm (2 to 3 in) wide, more or less closely egg-shaped. The apex is acute or rounded, base shortly indicated. The leaf margins are flat with two or three pairs of shallow lobes apical half, shiny dark green on top but gray underneath between 3 and 5 pairs of veins. The petiole is between 3 and 10 mm long. The flowers appear in spring. The acorns are between 1.2 and 1.6 cm (1/2 and 5/8 in) long, oblong, and dark brown. It produces acorns one at a time or in groups of three.
