= Quercus × harbisonii =

Scientific classification
- Kingdom: Plantae
- Clade: Tracheophytes
- Clade: Angiosperms
- Clade: Eudicots
- Clade: Rosids
- Order: Fagales
- Family: Fagaceae
- Genus: Quercus
- Subgenus: Quercus subg. Quercus
- Species: Q. × harbisonii

Binomial name
- Quercus × harbisonii C.S. Sargent

Rare hybrid species of oak

Quercus × harbisonii, commonly known as Harbison's oak and Harbison oak, is a rare hybrid species of oak in the family Fagaceae.

== Description ==
It is a medium-sized deciduous to semi-evergreen tree.

== Taxonomy ==
The Harbison oak is a naturally occurring hybrid of the post oak and live oak. It was originally described by Sargent as Quercus stellata var. margaretta × Quercus virginiana var. geminata. Some taxonomists regard Quercus margarettae and Quercus geminata as separate species. EJ Palmer noted that some Quercus × harbisonii were of the typical subspecies. Thus, Quercus × harbisonii is easily said as a hybrid of the post oak and live oak in the broad sense.

== Distribution ==
The tree is found in the southeastern United States. It is known from the states of Florida, North Carolina, South Carolina, Georgia, Texas and Oklahoma.
