= Magnolia rzedowskiana =

Conservation status
- Endangered (IUCN 3.1)

Scientific classification
- Kingdom: Plantae
- Clade: Tracheophytes
- Clade: Angiosperms
- Clade: Magnoliids
- Order: Magnoliales
- Family: Magnoliaceae
- Genus: Magnolia
- Subgenus: Magnolia subg. Magnolia
- Section: Magnolia sect. Macrophylla
- Species: M. rzedowskiana

Binomial name
- Magnolia rzedowskiana A.Vázquez, Domínguez-Yescas & R.Pedraza

Species of tree

Magnolia rzedowskiana is a species of flowering plant in the family Magnoliaceae. It is native to the Sierra Madre Oriental of San Luis Potosí, Querétaro, and Hidalgo states in eastern Mexico.

== Description ==
Magnolia rzedowskiana is a tree that can grow up to 20 meters tall. It has large, showy flowers, which appear in April and May. The trees fruit in August and September.

== Distribution and habitat ==
Magnolia rzedowskiana is known from three locations in the Sierra Madre Oriental – near La Joya del Hielo in the Sierra Gorda of Querétaro, in the Sierra de Xilitla of San Luis Potosí, and near Chapulhuacán in Hidalgo. The species has an estimated extent of occurrence (EOO) of 145 km^{2}.

It is found on calcareous soils in montane cloud forests between 800 and 1,950 meters elevation, including oak–Liquidambar styraciflua forests in Chapulhuacán, and pine–cypress forests in La Joya del Hielo.

It is cultivated in parts of Hidalgo and Veracruz.

== Classification ==
The species is named for the botanist Jerzy Rzedowski. It was until recently classed as Magnolia dealbata.

== Conservation ==
The species' conservation status is assessed as endangered. It has a small population and a limited range. It is threatened with habitat loss from deforestation, and people cutting down entire trees to harvest its flowers.
