= Tolantongo =

Box canyon in the Mezquital Valley, Hidalgo

Coordinates: 20°40′N 98°56′W

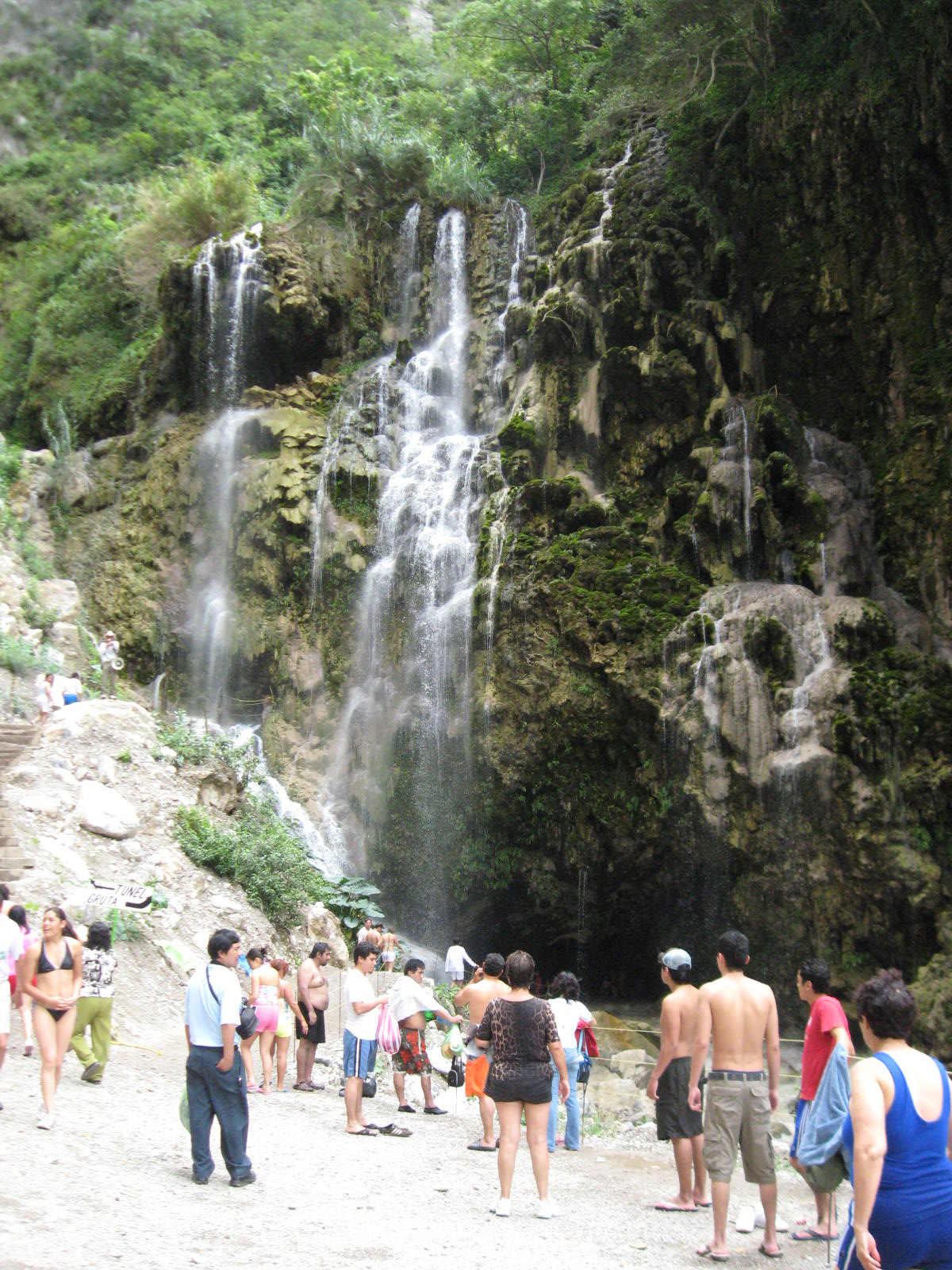
Approaching the mouth of the main grotto

Tolantongo is a box canyon and resort located 17 kilometres from Ixmiquilpan on Route 27 in the Mezquital Valley, State of Hidalgo in Mexico, It is about 1.5 hours northwest of Pachuca and 198 km or three-to-four hours north of Mexico City. The closest village to the resort is called El Cardonal and it is part of Cardonal Municipality.

From the Nahuatl Tonaltonko (Home where it feels warm). In his book "Lo que el viento nos dejo: hojas de terruño hidalguense", journalist Enrique Rivas Paniagua gives the etymology of Tolantongo a very deep look: "... the neighboring towns called it Tonaltongo (derivation of Tonaltonko), ... but in 1975 when this eden was discovered and was promoted by the magazine "Mexico Desconocido" the name was misspelled and that is how it "officially" got the name Tolantongo."

The river in the canyon is also called Tolantongo. It is pleasantly warm, colored by mineral salts it picks up as it passes through the mountain. The water comes from a complex series of channels inside the mountain that heats the water to about 37 degrees Celsius. Much of this water dwells in niches in the rocky side of the canyon, which has a cooling effect. Another factor is that the water mixes with unheated water as it leaves the grottoes. The result is mostly tepid water outside the grottoes and in the river itself, good for swimming even on a cold day.

Buses run from Mexico City to Ixmiquilpan. From there small buses run to Tolantongo, traveling that route four to nine times each day. Visitors also arrive by car.

== Resort ==
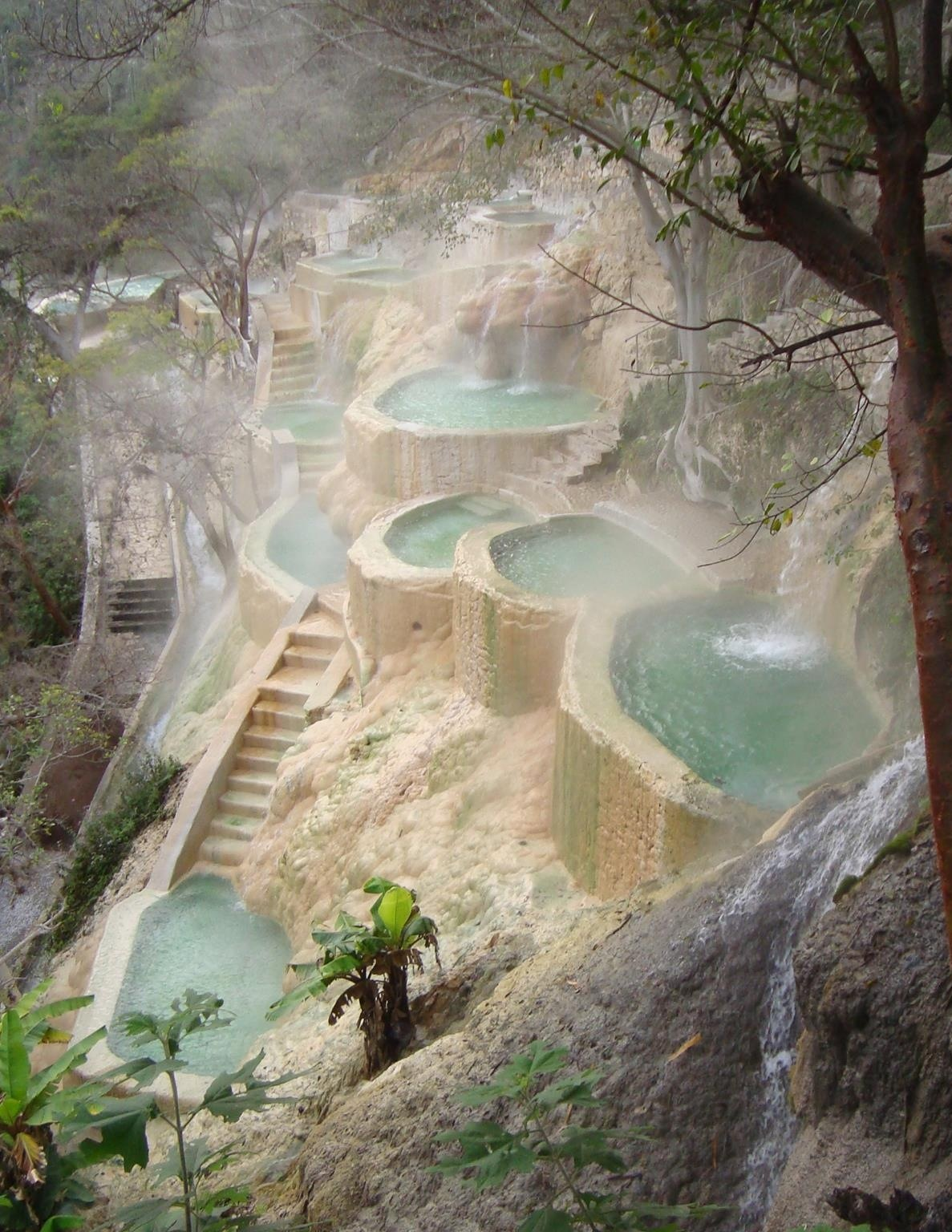

The resort is made up of three hotel complexes and heated pools near the bottom of a steep box canyon that has walls as much as 500 meters high. Its main attraction are two grottos at the canyon’s closed end, out of which flows a small volcanically-heated river which follows the canyon floor. The large grotto chamber is about half the size of a tennis court with a ceiling of up to ten metres. Above the grotto is a “tunnel”, a small cavern 15 metres deep in which warm water showers those who venture inside. Around these two openings, warm waterfalls flow down the steep canyon walls Here visitors can practice hiking, rappelling and spelunking.

The resort is open every day with pools, a restaurant, and grocery store, in addition to the three hotels and campgrounds.

== Ecological zone ==
The resort is located in a semi-desert zone, surrounded by rock formations carved by water flow and geological pressures. Exposed rock shows sedimentary layers that have folded. This and water erosion have created capricious forms that are all around this part of Hidalgo state. The high peaks in this area are often shrouded in mist. Cacti and semi-arid vegetation predominate in the hills above the canyon, with pine trees at the higher elevations. The rugged peaks have a great deal of biological diversity. Among the plant species to be found are yucca (Yucca spp), mesquite (Prosopis spp.), tall cacti called “viejitos” (little old ones) (Cephalocereus senilis), named so because their upper spines whiten and flatten, creating a grey-hair-like look, gumbo-limbos (Bursera simaruba), poinsettias (Euphorbia pulcherrima) as well as the abundant magueys that have been used for centuries to make pulque, a fermented beverage. Animals that can be seen include raccoons (Procyon lotor), greater roadrunners (Geococcyx californianus), hooded skunks (Mephitis macroura), white-nosed coatis (Nasua narica) and white-winged doves (Zenaida asiatica). Also, the area has been inhabited by various indigenous peoples such as the Otomi, the Mexica, the Toltecs and the Tepehua.

To arrive at the resort, one must leave the highway and travel down an unpaved road that winds its way down the side of one of the canyon walls. At the bottom of the canyon, the vegetation changes from semi-desert to semi-tropical due to the abundance of water and the humid warmth the river and falls give to the place. In some areas, the vegetation is quite exuberant. The beauty of the area enticed a Mexican soap opera or “telenovela” to shoot a number of romantic scenes here.

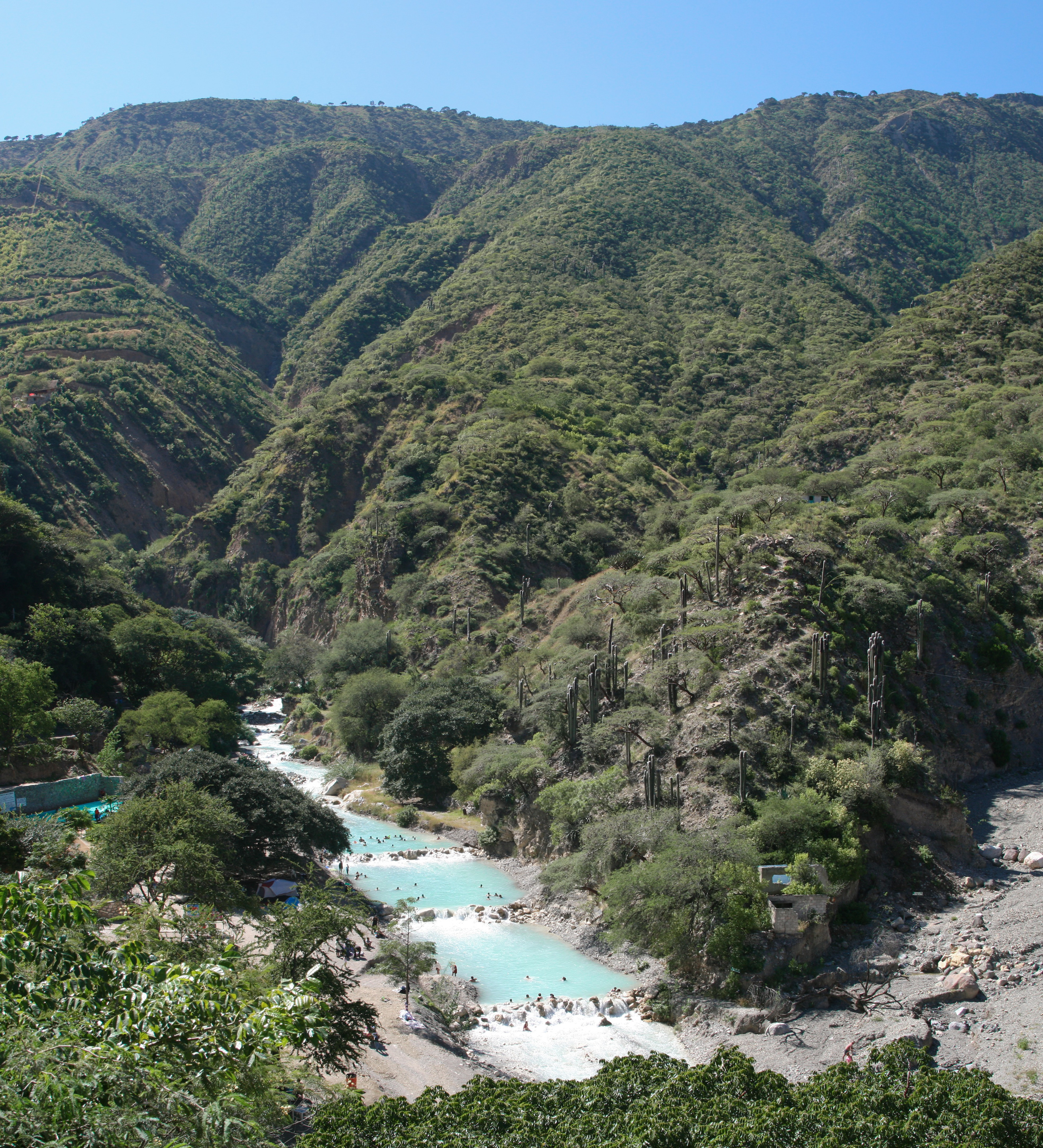
The river

== The grottos ==
There are two main grottos: the larger one from which the river flows and the “tunnel” above it on the same wall of the canyon. The larger grotto is classified as a karst cave, and was closed for a short time in 2004 due to a roof collapse. Inside this cave, the temperature rises noticeably and it is filled with stalactites and stalagmites. Just outside the main grotto are rimstone pools in which visitors can wallow in the shallow river as the water rushes past. The “tunnel” is called this due to its shape; narrow and about 15 meters long. Visitors inside the tunnel are showered by warm water that sprays out from the walls and ceiling. The temperature inside is similar to that of a steam bath. Inside one part there is a depression filled by a stream of water that one can swim in. This pool is filled with capriciously-shaped rocks. In both grottos, one can listen to the echoes of the waterfalls inside the mountain. It is possible to rappel from the various high domes in these two grottos, but it is still considered dangerous because of the wet walls and large amounts of water vapor in the air.

== Other features ==
On various sections of the canyon walls are man-made semi-circular “chapoteaderos” or splashing pools, created by damming small warm springs. Most of these are shaded by trees, allowing tourists to bath in warm waters while overlooking the canyon at the same time.

Similar to the chapoteaderos, but created naturally, La Gloria is a set of three pools that run down one of the walls of the canyon. Curiously, the water is warm in the uppermost pool, cool in the middle pool and warm again in the bottom pool. Water falls all around these three pools in trickles and large streams. There are also camping and sanitary facilities by these pools.

== Management of resort area ==
The resort does not have the usual managerial structure. The grottos and the resort belong to the “Socieded Cooperative Ejidal “Grutas Tolantongo””(Cooperative Ejido Society of the Tolantongo Grottos). This association was formed 30 years ago by the 112 families that own the ejido (a type of communal property) (Bowman), called San Cristobal. This ejido has about 5,200 hectares, with only 40 open to the public. All workers belong to these ejido families and dress similarly, no matter what their job. While certain jobs do pay more, these rotate among members. Each family gets a vote in the affairs of the ejido. The project was launched in the 1970s with neither outside expertise nor government help and still functions without outside resources. A percentage of the resort’s profits are reinvested back into the enterprise. While today the park and resort are well-run and tranquil, the enterprise had problems with drugs, violence and vandalism when it first began. Working with local authorities, they created barriers to control access and gained permission to carry firearms as deputies to patrol ejido land. Despite the problems and the lack of governmental help, the ejido association has managed to preserve much of the resort and the ejido land around it in its natural state.

Most of the canyon area is owned by the association but two ejidos share the area, each owning one side of the canyon. The side with La Gloria is owned by another ejido, La Mesa, and charges separately.

== See also ==
- Tolantongo hot springs
- Rzedowskia tolantonguensis, Mexican plant named after the area
