= Rzedowskia =

Scientific classification
- Kingdom: Plantae
- Clade: Tracheophytes
- Clade: Angiosperms
- Clade: Eudicots
- Clade: Rosids
- Order: Celastrales
- Family: Celastraceae
- Genus: Rzedowskia; Medrano
- Species: R. tolantonguensis

Binomial name
- Rzedowskia tolantonguensis Medrano

Species of flowering plant

Rzedowskia is a monotypic genus of flowering plants belonging to the family Celastraceae. It contains one known species, Rzedowskia tolantonguensis, native to eastern Mexico.

The genus name of Rzedowskia is in honour of Jerzy Rzedowski (1926–2023), a Mexican botanist. His focus was on Mexican floristics, taxonomy, and ecology. The Latin specific epithet of tolantonguensis refers to Tolantongo, a box canyon and resort in the state of Hidalgo, where the plant was found. Both the genus and the species were first described and published in the Boletín de la Sociedad Botánica de México Vol. 41, page 41 in 1981.

In 1997, sesquiterpenes were extracted from Rzedowskia tolantonguensis.
