= Carminatia papagayana =

Scientific classification
- Kingdom: Plantae
- Clade: Tracheophytes
- Clade: Angiosperms
- Clade: Eudicots
- Clade: Asterids
- Order: Asterales
- Family: Asteraceae
- Genus: Carminatia
- Species: C. papagayana

Binomial name
- Carminatia papagayana B.L.Turner

Species of flowering plant

Carminatia alvarezii is a rare Mexican species of annual plants in the family Asteraceae. It has been found only in the state of Guerrero.
