= Carminatia =

Scientific classification
- Kingdom: Plantae
- Clade: Embryophytes
- Clade: Tracheophytes
- Clade: Angiosperms
- Clade: Eudicots
- Clade: Asterids
- Order: Asterales
- Family: Asteraceae
- Subfamily: Asteroideae
- Tribe: Eupatorieae
- Genus: Carminatia; Moc. ex DC.

Type species
- Carminatia tenuiflora DC.

Genus of flowering plants

Carminatia is a genus of annual plants in the family Asteraceae. They are native primarily to Mexico, but also the southwestern United States and Central America.

== Description ==
These plants have erect stems which are unbranched or have few branches and grow 10 centimeters (4 inches) to well over 100 centimeters (40 inches) in height. The leaves are mostly opposite, but on the upper stem they may be alternately arranged. The cylindrical flower heads are just a few millimeters wide and are arranged in narrow or spikelike inflorescences. They contain 8 to 12 greenish or whitish disc florets. The fruit is a cypsela with a pappus of several plumelike bristles or scales.

Species

- Carminatia alvarezii Rzed. & Calderón - San Luis Potosí, Querétaro, Puebla, Oaxaca, México State, Hidalgo
- Carminatia papagayana B.L.Turner - Guerrero
- Carminatia recondita McVaugh - Guatemala, El Salvador, Chiapas, Colima, Guerrero, Oaxaca, Jalisco, México State, Michoacán, Morelos, Nayarit, Veracruz, Sinaloa, San Luis Potosí
- Carminatia tenuiflora DC. - Guatemala, El Salvador, most of Mexico, southern Arizona, southwestern New Mexico, western Texas
