= Magnolia nuevoleonensis =

Conservation status
- Endangered (IUCN 3.1)

Scientific classification
- Kingdom: Plantae
- Clade: Tracheophytes
- Clade: Angiosperms
- Clade: Magnoliids
- Order: Magnoliales
- Family: Magnoliaceae
- Genus: Magnolia
- Subgenus: Magnolia subg. Magnolia
- Section: Magnolia sect. Macrophylla
- Species: M. nuevoleonensis

Binomial name
- Magnolia nuevoleonensis A.Vázquez & Domínguez-Yescas

Species of flowering plant

Magnolia nuevoleonensis is a species of flowering plant in the family Magnoliaceae. It is native to the Sierra Madre Oriental of Nuevo León state in northeastern Mexico.

== Description ==
Magnolia nuevoleonensis is a large deciduous tree, growing up to 20 meters tall. It has large open creamy to white flowers, which measure 20-24 cm in diameter.

== Distribution and habitat ==
Magnolia nuevoleonensis is known from only two locations in the Sierra Madre Oriental of Nuevo León state. The species has an estimated extent of occurrence (EOO) of less than 280 km^{2}, and an estimated area of occupancy (AOO) of less than 1 km^{2}. Velazco-Macías et al. (2008) estimates a density of 30 individuals per 100 square meters, with a total population of more than 1,000 individuals.

It grows in pine–oak forests from 1,500 to 1,700 meters elevation, together with pines (Pinus spp.), oaks (Quercus spp.), Cornus florida, and Sambucus canadensis. It is often found in deep ravines.

The species was until recently classed as Magnolia dealbata.

== Conservation ==
The species' conservation status is assessed as endangered. It has a small population and a limited range, and is threatened with habitat loss from deforestation.
