= Tolantongo hot springs =

Hot spring system in Hidalgo, Mexico

- Las Grutas de Tolantongo
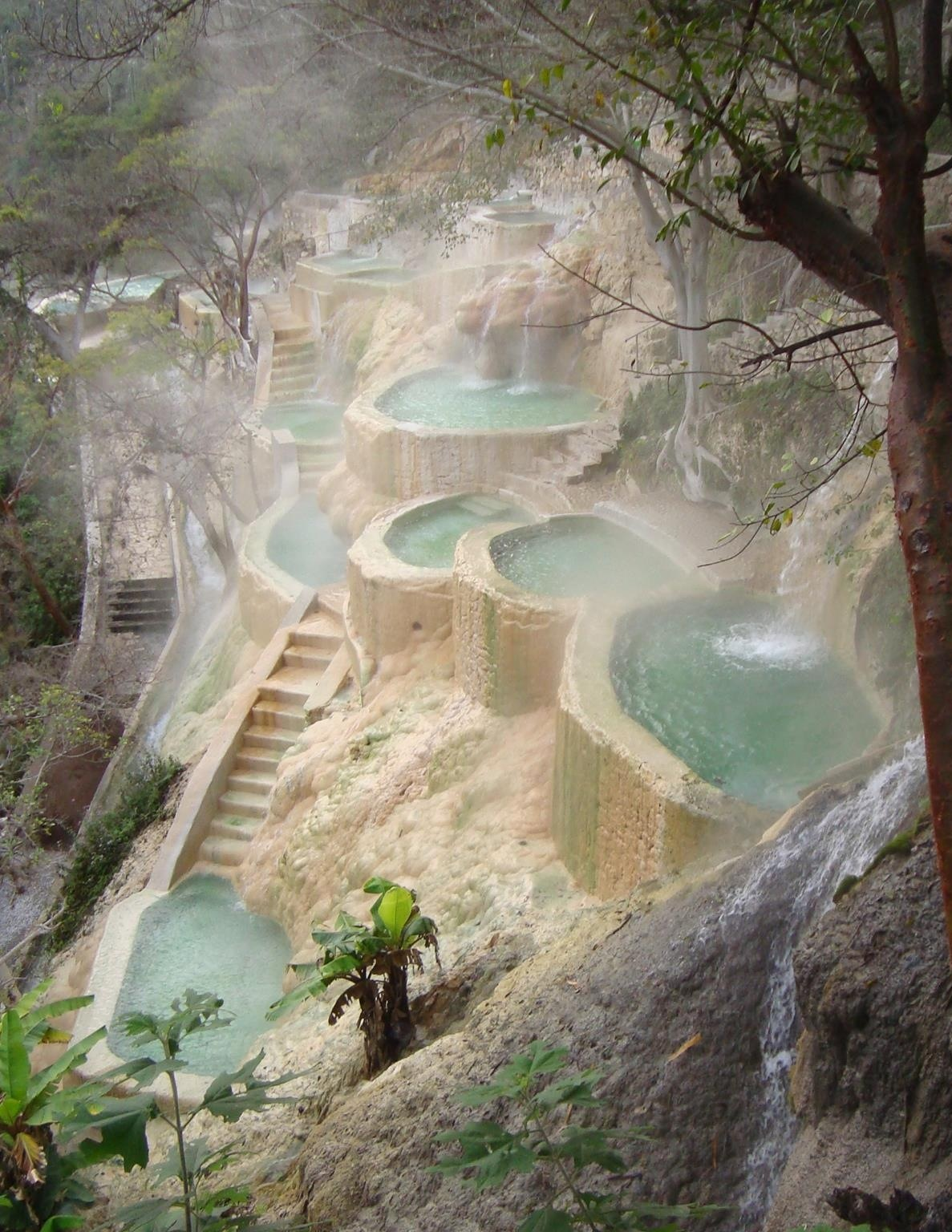
- Interactive map of Tolantongo hot springs
- Location: In the Tolantongo box canyon in the Mezquital Valley, three hours by car from Queretaro City
- Coordinates: 20.627933°N 98.987798°W
- Elevation: 4,200 feet (1,300 m)
- Type: geothermal
- Temperature: 36 °C (97 °F) to 38 °C (100 °F) in the soaking pools

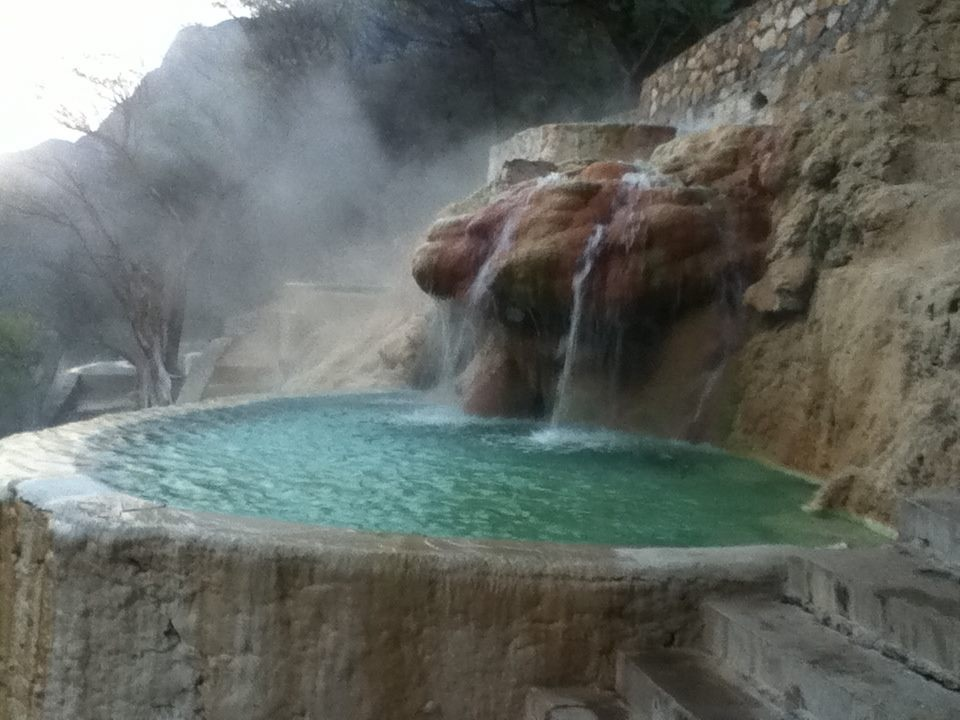
Poza Tolantongo soaking pool

Tolantongo hot springs are a system of geothermal springs in the Tolantongo box canyon in the Mezquital Valley, in the state of Hidalgo, Mexico.

== History ==
The hot springs are located on an ejido, the Ejido de San Cristóbal, a system of cooperative land ownership that restored rights to farmers and Mexico's Indigenous people to own their own land. During the 1970s, the site began to be developed through the construction of a road to the geothermal area, the caves, providing access to the hot springs, waterfalls and river. This was done in consideration of both commercial development and ecosystem sustainability. The construction was done by the local ejido residents. A resort has been built on site, and there are camping options available. The Cooperative Ejido Society of the Tolantongo Grottos owns the land and the resort facilities.

== Description ==
The hot springs are located in a steep canyon accessible by a narrow road with hairpin turns. There are multiple sources where the hot spring water emerges from the ground and a series of caves. These flow into a network of pipes and into dozens of soaking pools that cascade down a hillside. The largest source is a cave located near the terminus of a canyon. As one descends the cliff face with multiple soaking pools, there is a tunnel at the base of the canyon containing additional soaking areas and small caves.

The hot springs infrastructure, and network of soaking pools are drained and cleaned every other day.

== Water profile ==
After emerging from the underground sources, the spring water cools to approximately 37 °C (99 °F) in the soaking pools. The mineral water is high in calcium and magnesium which affects the color of the spring water, giving it a bright turquoise color.
