= Carminatia tenuiflora =

Conservation status
- Secure (NatureServe)

Scientific classification
- Kingdom: Plantae
- Clade: Tracheophytes
- Clade: Angiosperms
- Clade: Eudicots
- Clade: Asterids
- Order: Asterales
- Family: Asteraceae
- Genus: Carminatia
- Species: C. tenuiflora

Binomial name
- Carminatia tenuiflora DC. 1836

Synonyms
- Brickellia tenuiflora (DC.) D.J.Keil & Pinkava

Species of flowering plant

Carminatia tenuiflora (plumeweed) is a species of annual plant in the family Asteraceae. It is native primarily to Mexico, but also to the southwestern United States and Central America.

== Description ==
These plants have erect stems, either unbranched or with few branches, and grow from 10 centimeters (4 in) to over 100 centimeters (40 in) in height. The leaves are mostly opposite, but those on the upper stem may be alternately arranged. The cylindrical flower heads are a few millimeters wide and arranged in narrow or spikelike-like inflorescences. They contain 8 to 12 greenish or whitish disc florets. The fruit is an cypsela with a pappus of plumelike bristles or scales.

Carminatia tenuiflora is found in Guatemala, El Salvador, most of Mexico and in the United States (southern Arizona, southwestern New Mexico, and western Texas).
