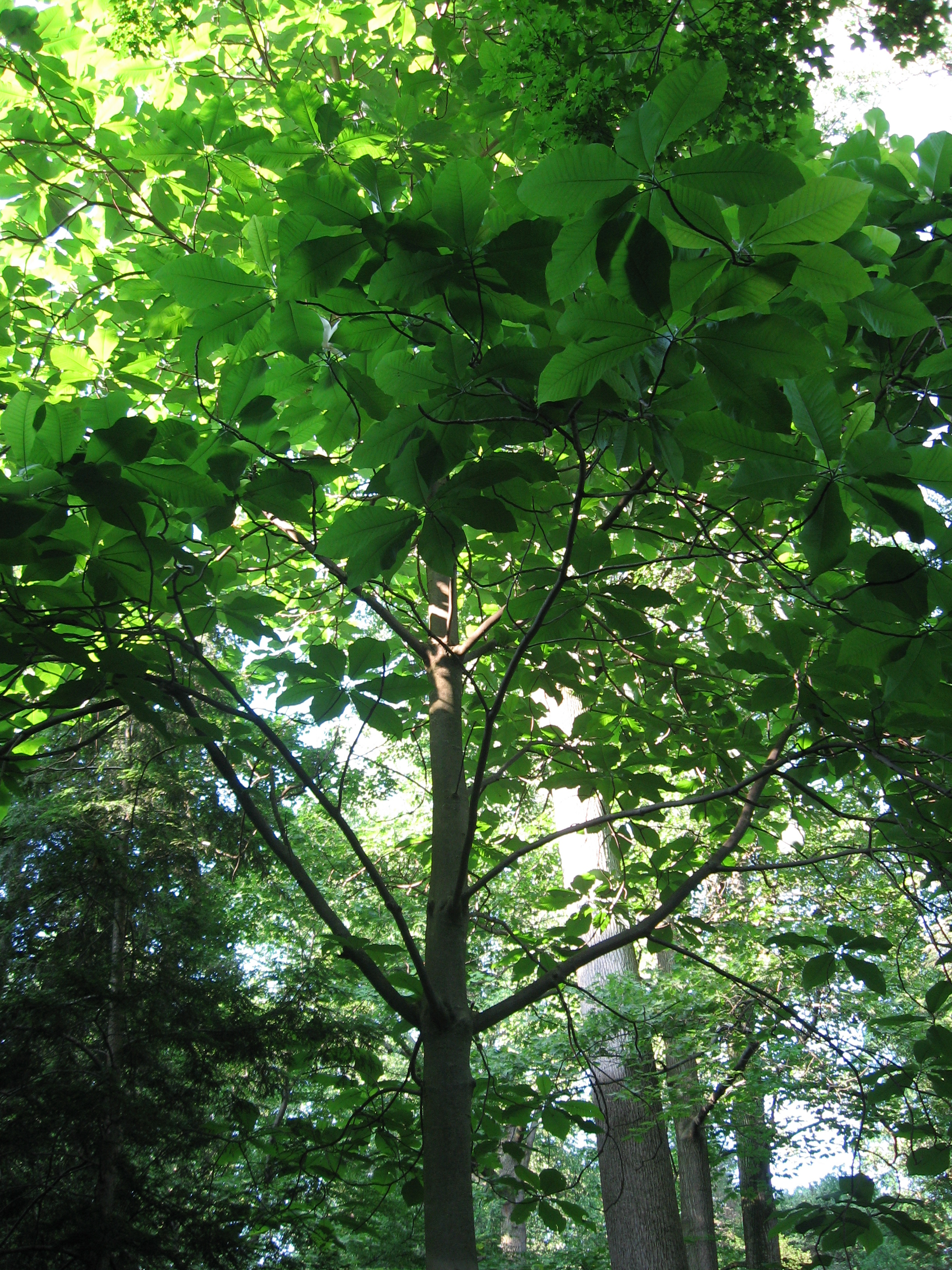

Conservation status
- Least Concern (IUCN 3.1)

Scientific classification
- Kingdom: Plantae
- Clade: Embryophytes
- Clade: Tracheophytes
- Clade: Spermatophytes
- Clade: Angiosperms
- Clade: Magnoliids
- Order: Magnoliales
- Family: Magnoliaceae
- Genus: Magnolia
- Subgenus: Magnolia subg. Magnolia
- Section: Magnolia sect. Macrophylla
- Species: M. macrophylla

Binomial name
- Magnolia macrophylla Michx.
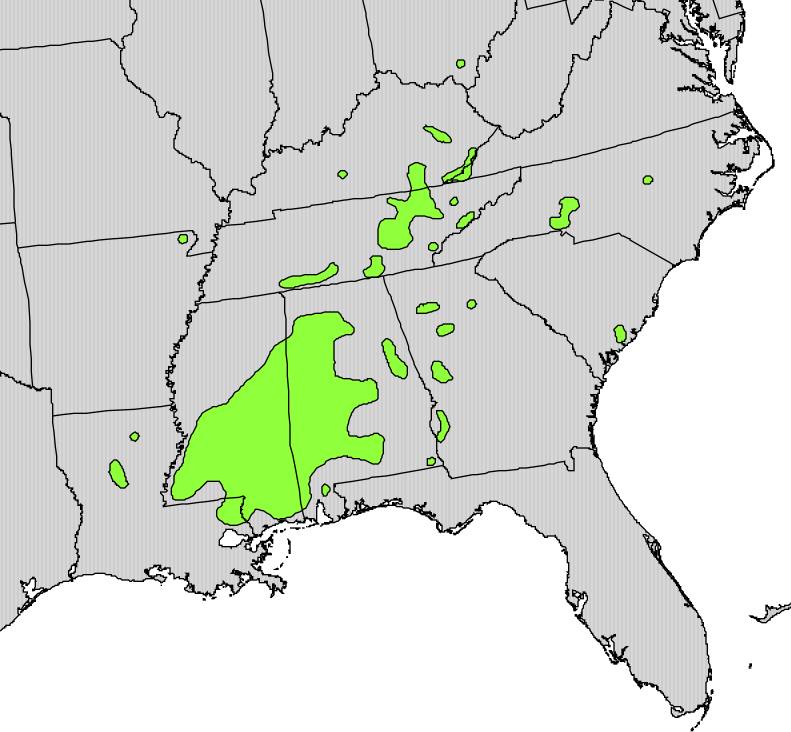
- Natural range

= Magnolia macrophylla =

Bigleaf magnolia

Species of tree

Magnolia macrophylla, the bigleaf magnolia, is a deciduous magnolia native to the southeastern United States. This species boasts the largest simple leaf and single flower of any native woody plant in North America.

== Classification ==
Magnolia macrophylla is currently considered monotypic, with no subspecies or varieties. In the past, it was often treated as having two subspecies, subsp. ashei and subsp. dealbata, but these are now treated as separate species, Magnolia ashei in Florida, and Magnolia dealbata in eastern Mexico.

== Description ==
The bigleaf magnolia is a medium-sized understory tree 15–20 m (49–66 ft) tall, though some individuals over 27 m tall (and over 100 cm circumference) have been documented by the Eastern Native Tree Society. This species is distinguished from other magnolias by the large leaf size, 24–60 cm (9.4–23.6 in) (rarely to 100 cm (39 in)) long and 11–26 cm (4.3–10.2 in) (rarely to 32 cm (13 in)) broad, with a stout 5.5–15 cm (2.2–5.9 in) petiole. The tree's branches often bend under the weight of this heavy foliage. The flowers typically have nine tepals (sometimes only six), with three whorls of three tepals each, the larger ones with a purple spot at the base. The tepals are typically about 14.5–20.5 cm (5.7–8.1 in) long and 5–14 cm (2.0–5.5 in) wide. It is, like all Magnolias, beetle pollinated. The fruit is a cone-like cluster of achenes 5.5–8 cm (2.2–3.1 in) long. The mature seeds, each covered with an orange aril, hang down from the cone on silk-like threads, making themselves readily available to passing birds.

=== Bee mortality ===
At the Arnold Arboretum, dead bees have been observed inside bigleaf magnolia flowers. However the bees in cited article are honeybees which are not native to North America.

== Distribution and habitat ==
Bigleaf magnolia is found in rich mesic woods; any disturbance that lets more light reach the ground is beneficial to the establishment of bigleaf magnolia, but despite its relatively fast growth-rate when stimulated by more light, other understory and canopy trees/seedlings are usually able to outgrow and out-compete it. This suits the plant just fine as it is tolerant of low light levels; it does not need full sun to survive once established (however, it does not tolerate full shade). Natural regeneration is quite limited due to the scarcity of mature, seed-bearing plants and the fact that this tree's population mostly consists of widely scattered individuals. In addition, this species is plagued by poor seed set (most likely from limiting factors mentioned above) and low seed viability, a trait shared by its cousin and frequent associate in the wild in Appalachia, the Fraser magnolia.

In the southeastern United States, especially Alabama and surrounding areas, Magnolia macrophylla is sometimes called the "cowcumber magnolia", in contrast with the much smaller-leaved cucumber-tree magnolia, M. acuminata.

== Threats ==
Collection, both legal and illegal, may have an adverse impact on this tree's population due to low population density, and high collection pressure can extirpate this species locally. Bigleaf magnolia is listed as threatened in North Carolina and endangered in Arkansas and Ohio.

== Cultivation ==
Bigleaf magnolia is often short-lived under cultivation unless its rather demanding requirements are met. This tree likes loose, undisturbed rich mesic soil (or mulch and compost substitutes) in full sun or part shade with moist, well-drained soil and a low pH. This tree will likely succeed in sites that closely mimic its natural habitat and where it is protected from strong wind that can tatter its large foliage. It can be grown farther north than its southerly range suggests, but needs watering during extended dry periods. This plant is generally problem-free.

== Gallery ==
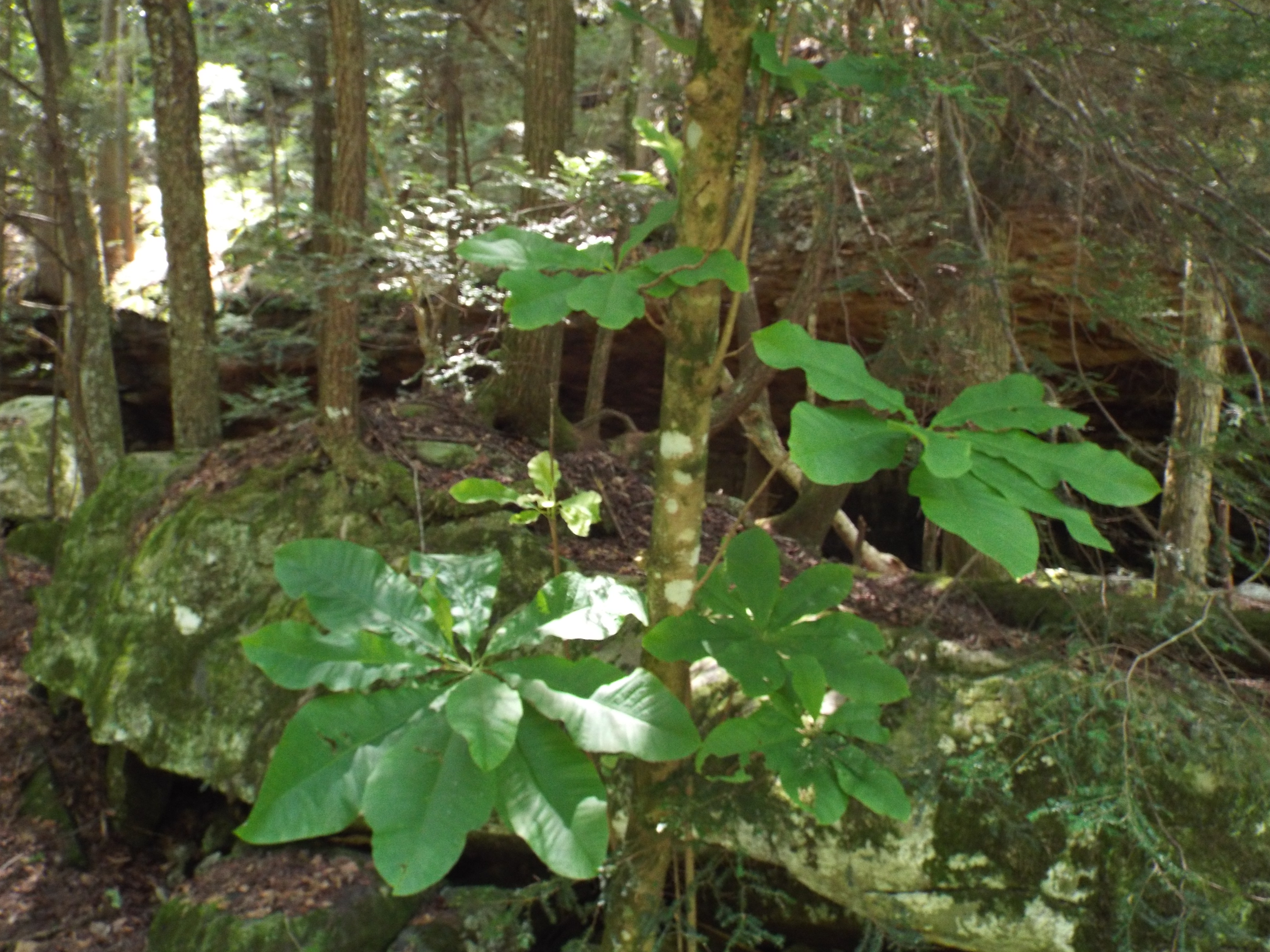
Young tree in North Chickamauga Creek, Tennessee

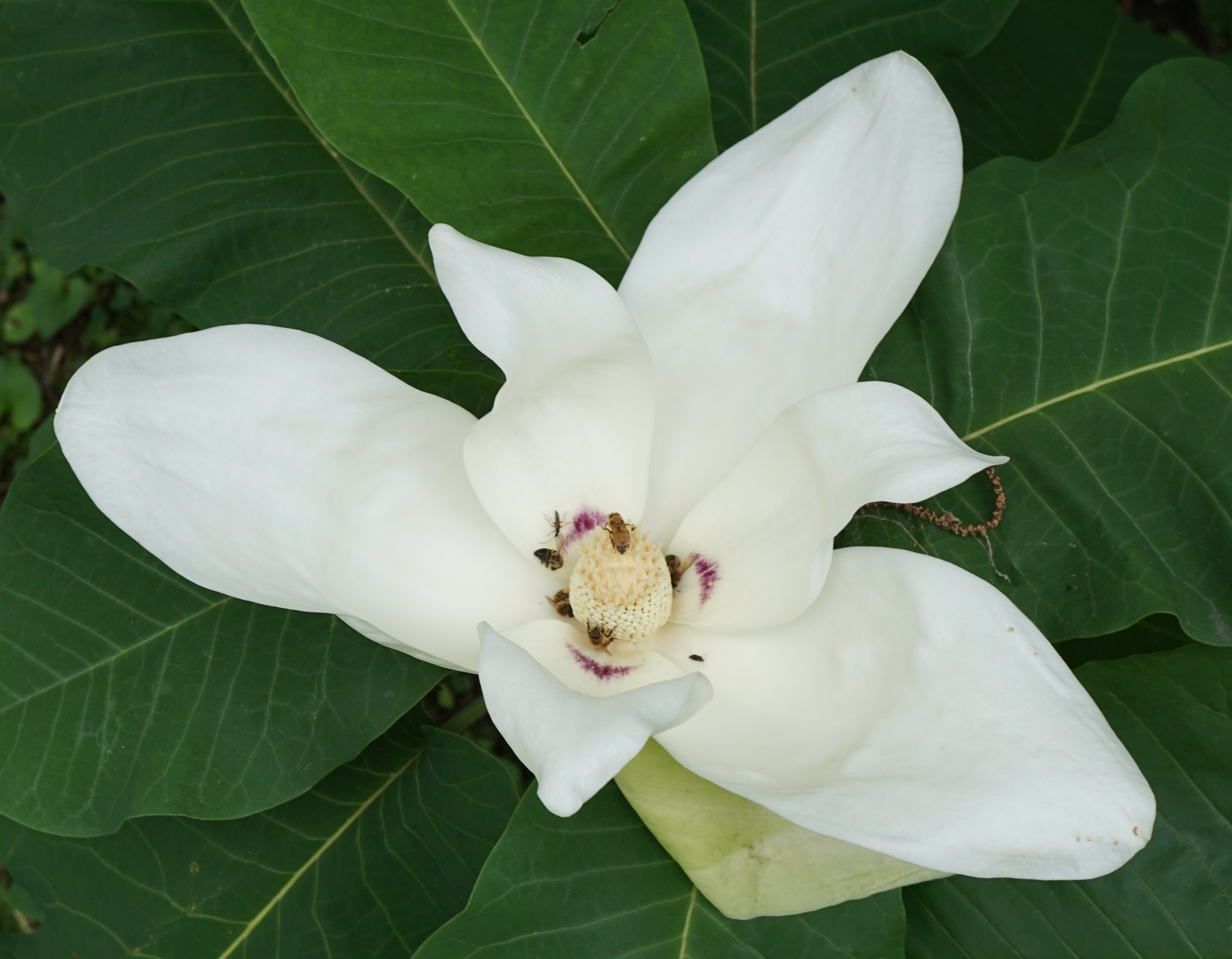
Open flower

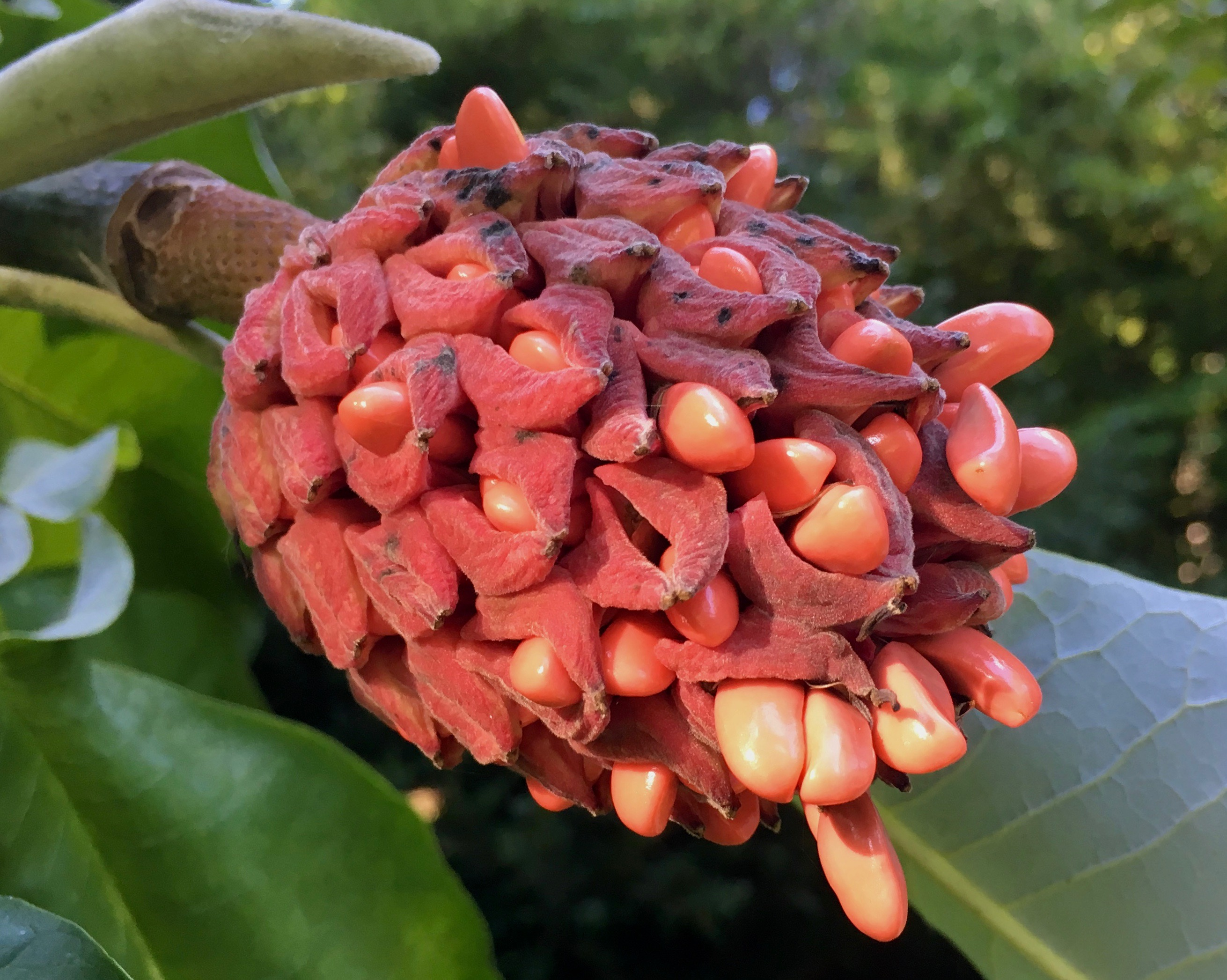
Mature fruit

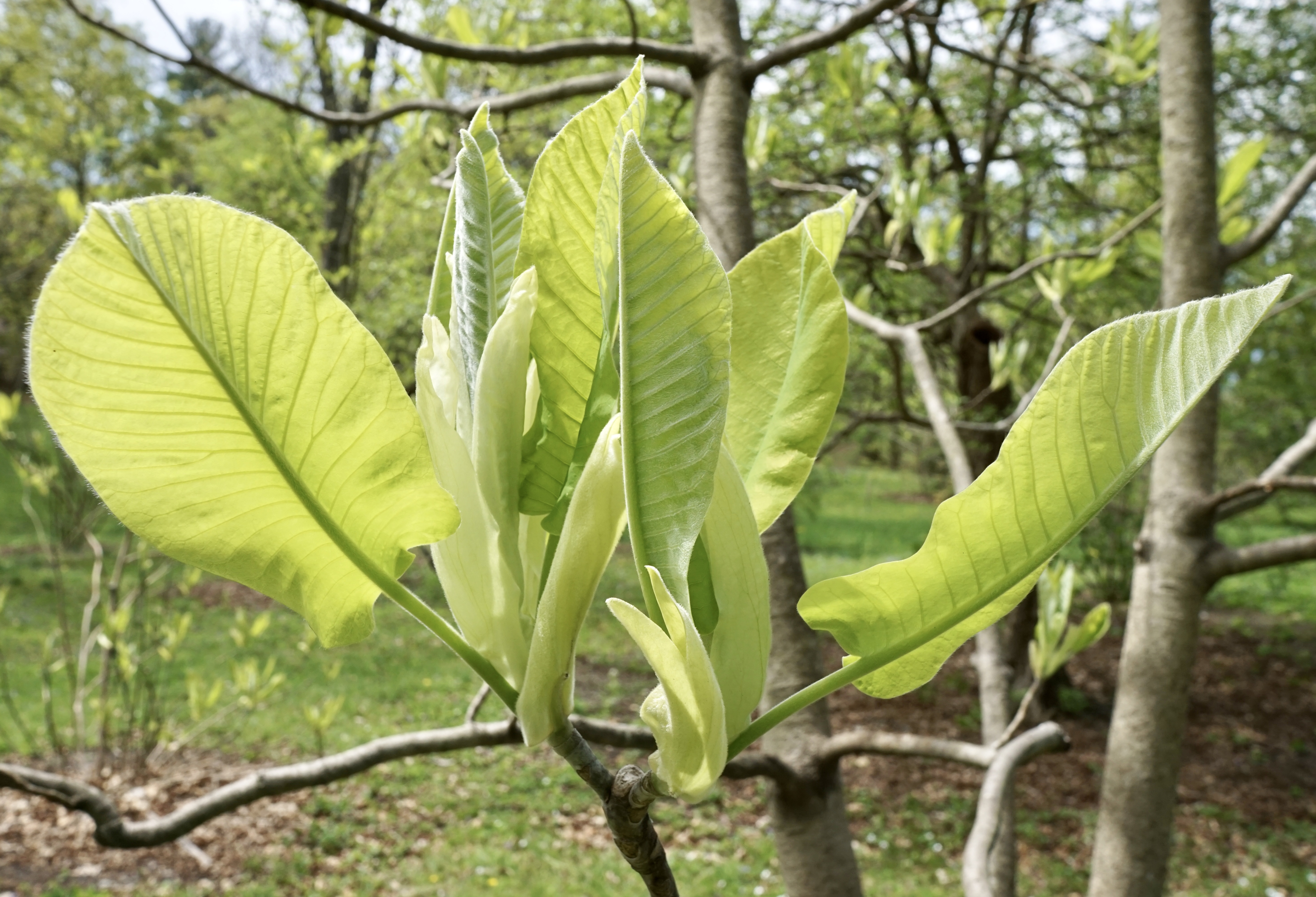
At bud break

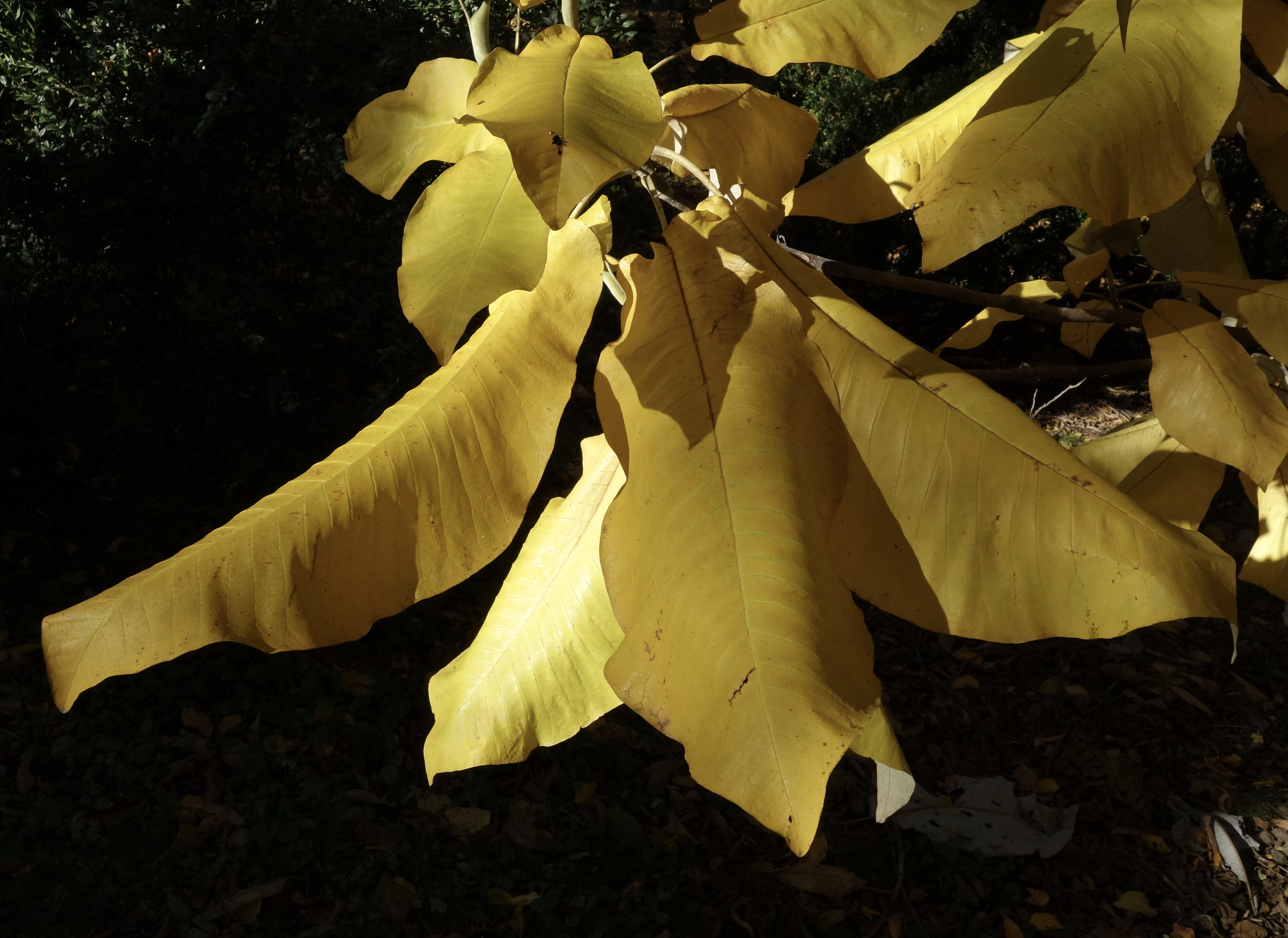
Leaves in fall

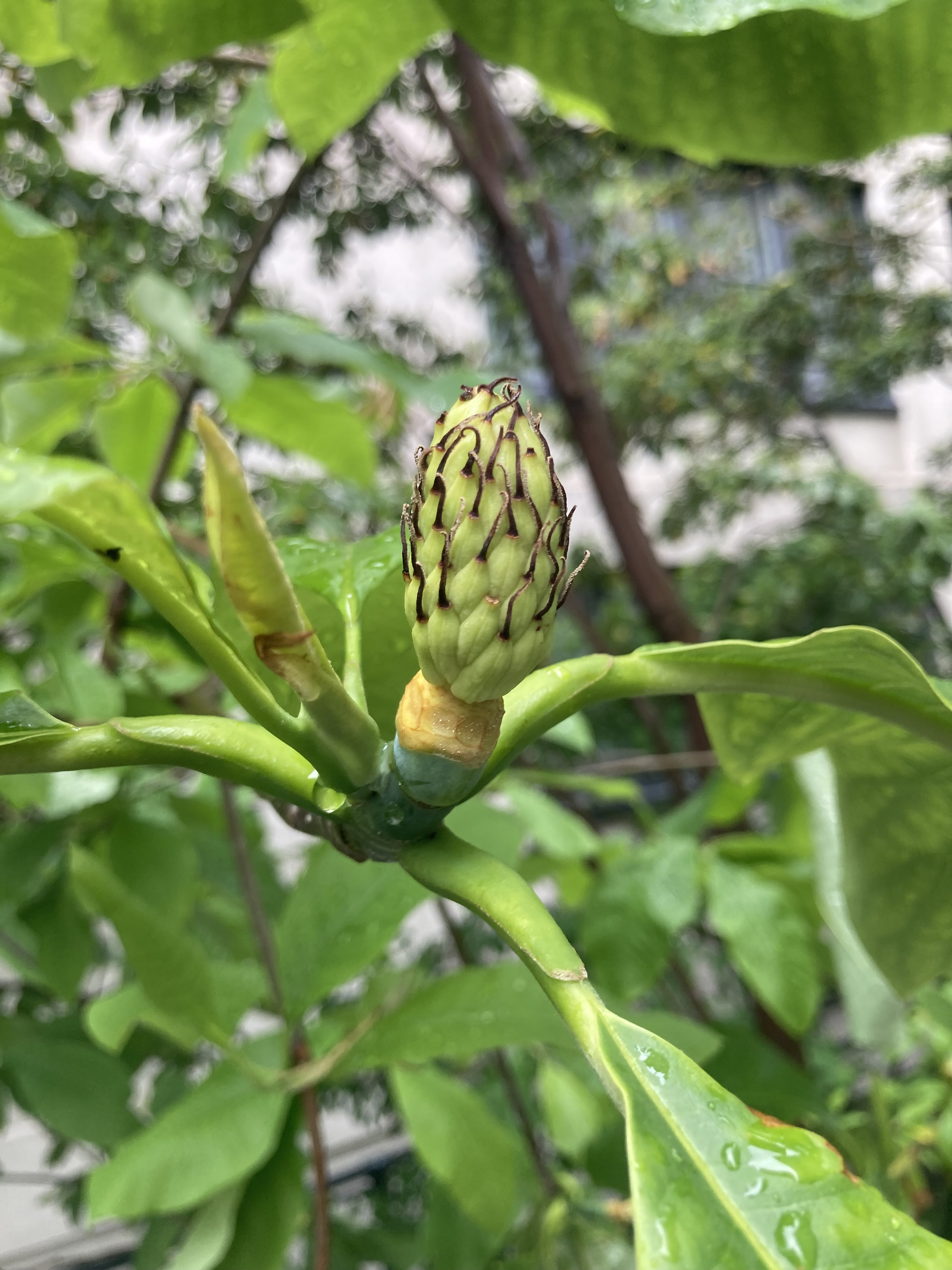
An unripe fruit.

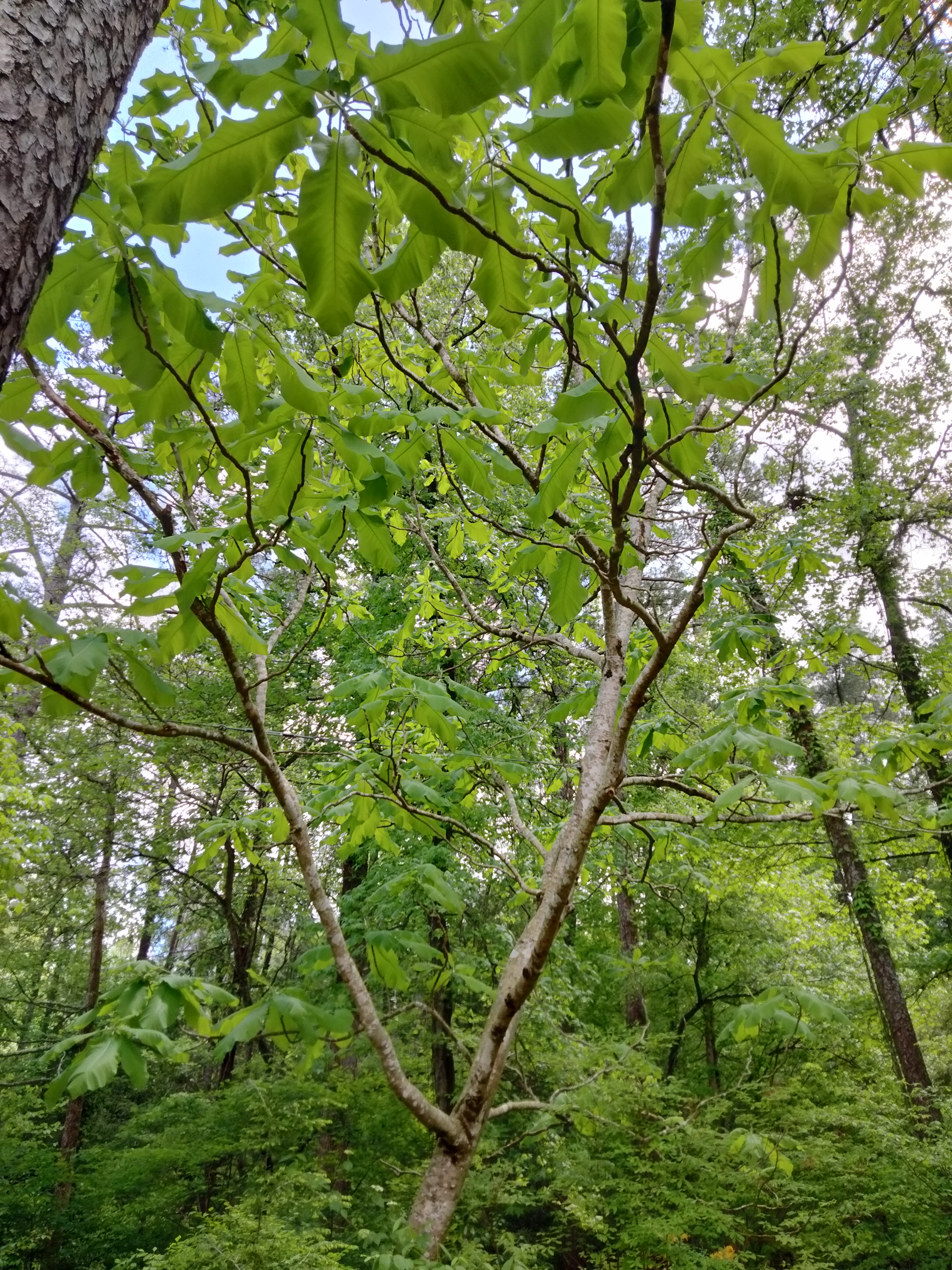
Large specimen growing on NCSU campus.

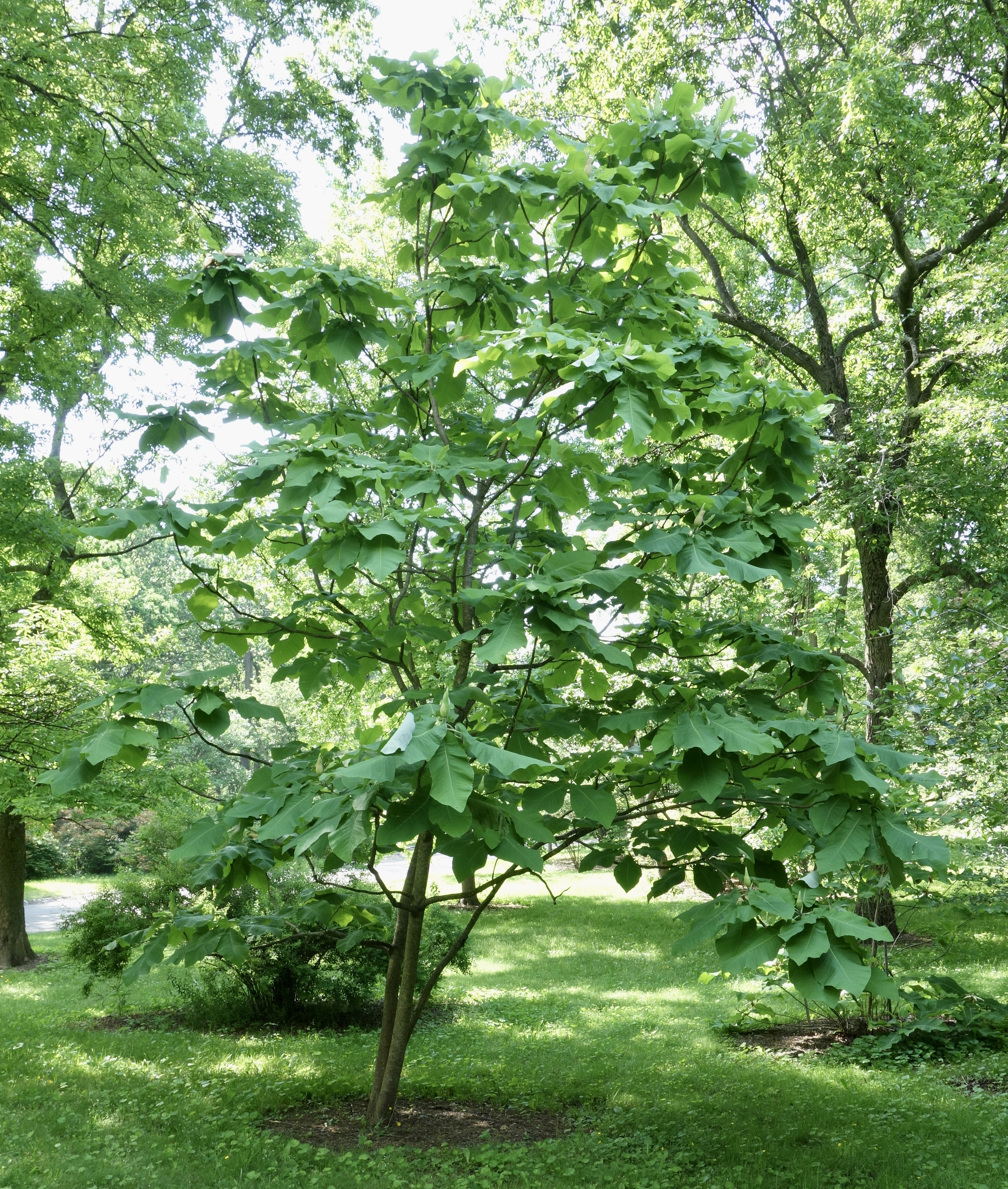
Magnolia macrophylla 1989 accession (#960-89*A), Arnold Arboretum of Harvard University

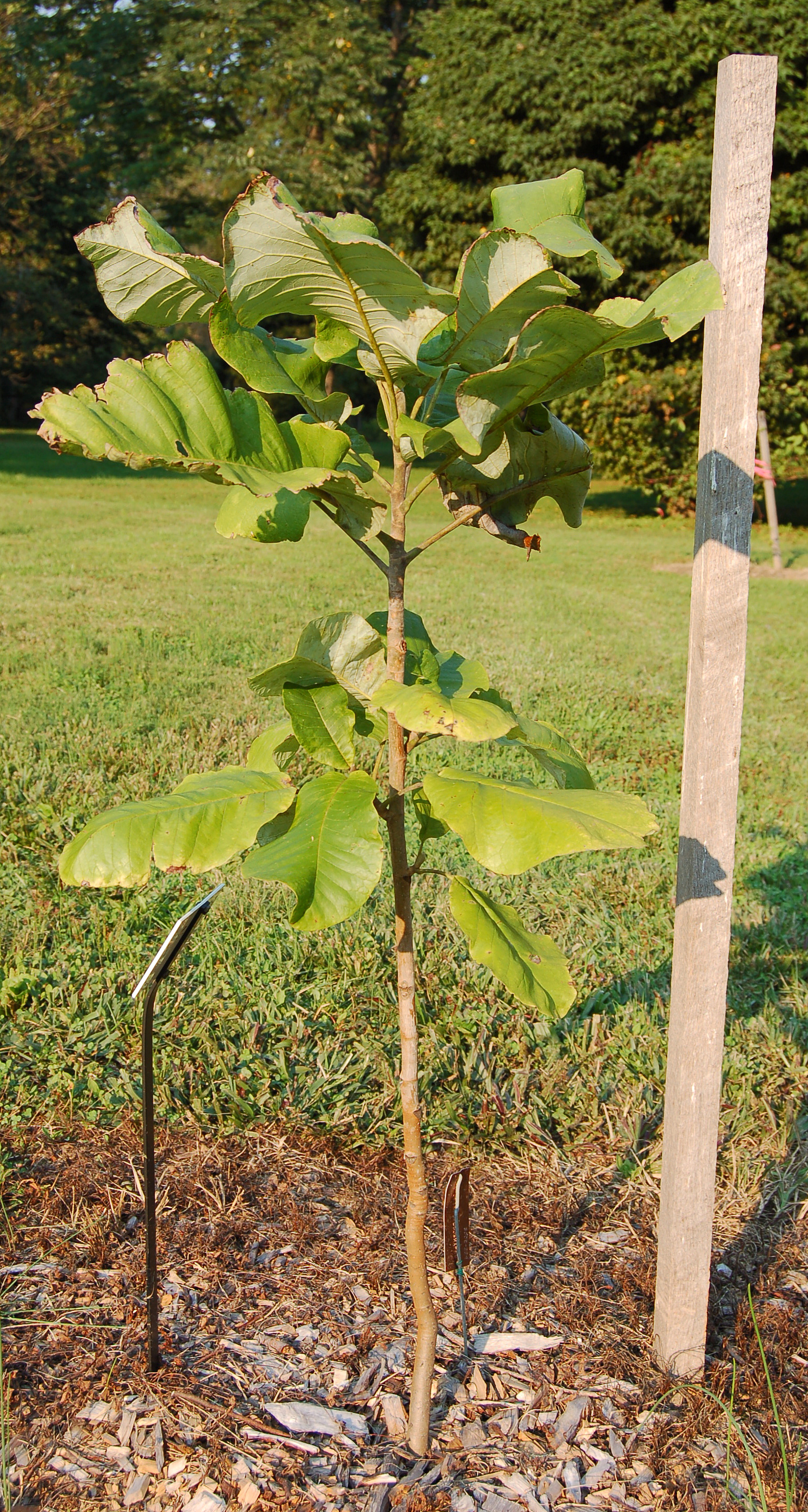
A sapling planted in the Tyler Arboretum

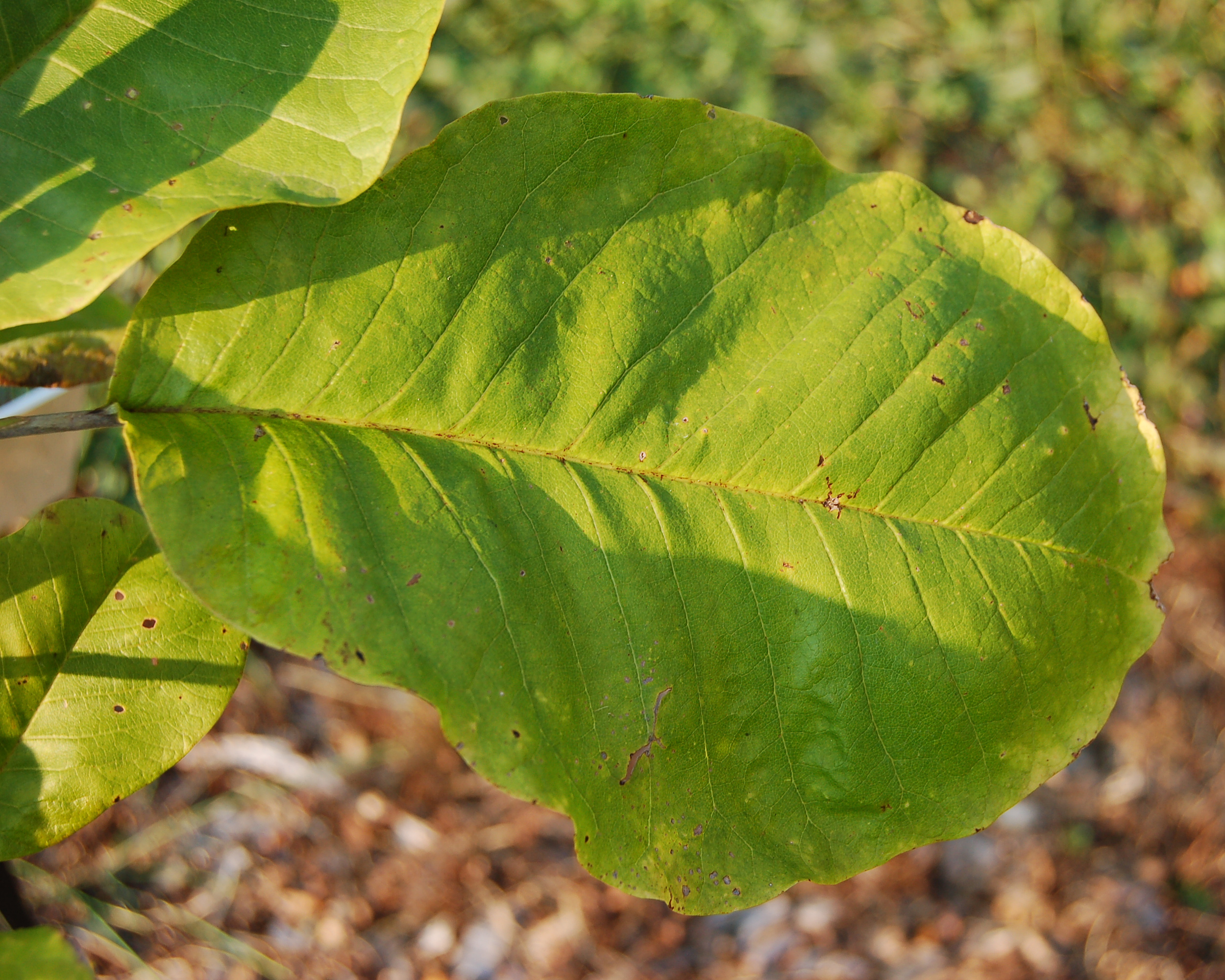
A single leaf on the above sapling

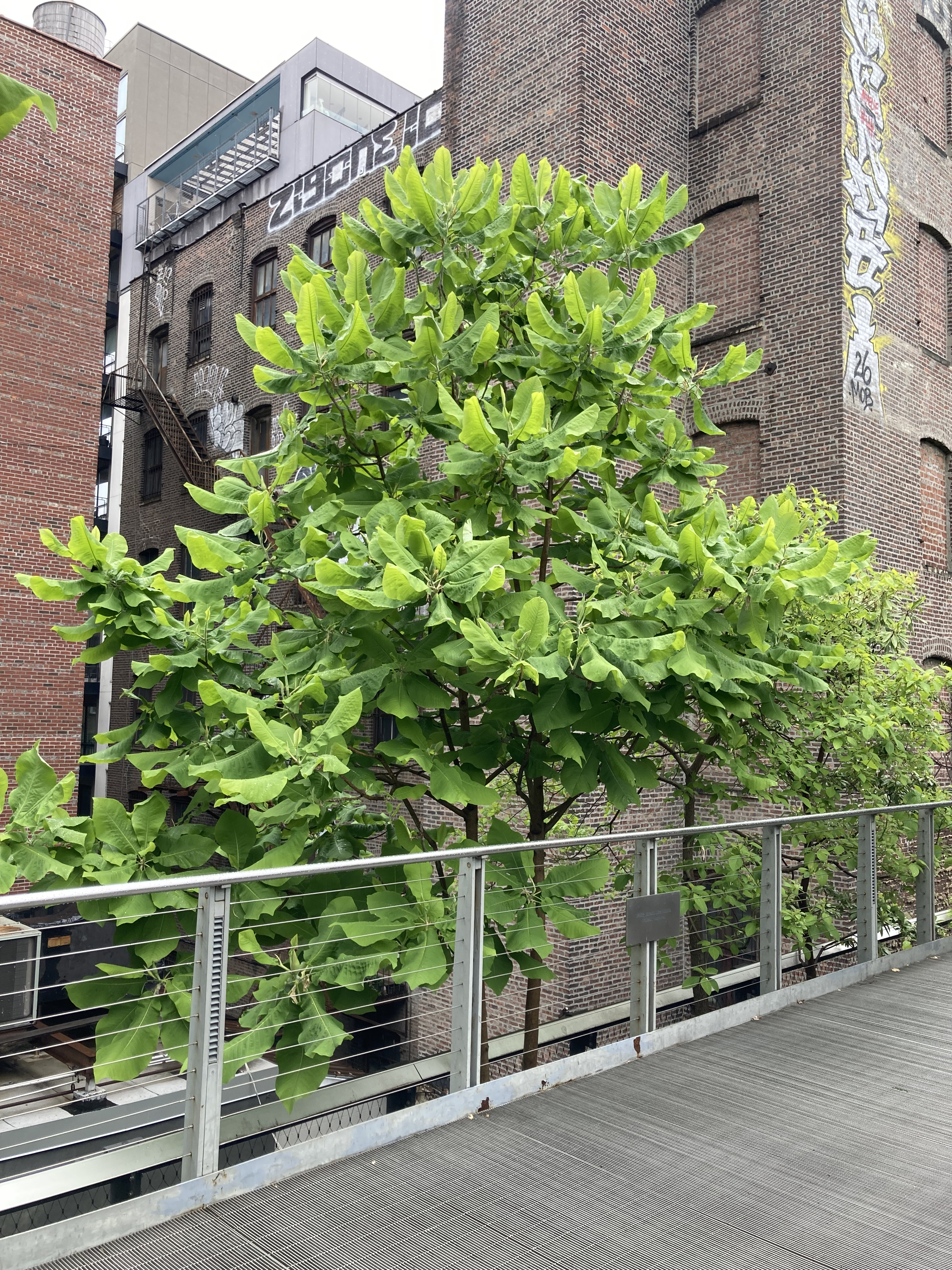
A northerly specimen planted on NYC's Highline.
