= Carminatia recondita =

Scientific classification
- Kingdom: Plantae
- Clade: Tracheophytes
- Clade: Angiosperms
- Clade: Eudicots
- Clade: Asterids
- Order: Asterales
- Family: Asteraceae
- Genus: Carminatia
- Species: C. recondita

Binomial name
- Carminatia recondita McVaugh

Synonyms
- Brickellia recondita (McVaugh) Keil & Pinkava

Species of flowering plant

Carminatia recondita is a Mesoamerican species of annual plants in the family Asteraceae.

Carminatia recondita is an annual herb with opposite leaves. Flower heads are borne in a spiked inflorescence, each head with about 11 greenish disc florets but no ray florets.

Carminatia recondita is found in Guatemala, El Salvador, Chiapas, Colima, Guerrero, Oaxaca, Jalisco, México State, Michoacán, Morelos, Nayarit, Veracruz, Sinaloa, and San Luis Potosí.
