= Jerzy Rzedowski =

Polish-born Mexican botanist (1926–2023)

- Born: Jerzy Rzędowski Rotter; 27 December 1926; Lwów, Poland
- Died: March 2023 (aged 96); Pátzcuaro, Michoacán, México
- Occupation: Botanist
- Known for: Pioneer in Neotropical floristics
- Spouse: Graciela Calderón

Jerzy Rzedowski Rotter (27 December 1926 – March 2023) was a Polish-born Mexican botanist, whose focus was on Mexican floristics, taxonomy, and ecology.

== Early life and education ==
Rzedowski was born in Lwów, Poland (now in Ukraine) to Arnold and Ernestyna (nee Rotter) Rzedowski. The family moved to Silesia when he was a child. When he was young the family was imprisoned in a concentration camp until World War II ended, when he was liberated by the Allies. They then travelled to Mexico in 1946 for a new life.

Rzedowski studied for a bachelor's degree in Biology at the Instituto Politecnico Nacional, starting in 1949, and a PhD in Botany at Universidad Nacional Autónoma de México awarded in 1961. His bachelor's thesis, on the Flora of the Pedregal de San Angel, (Vegetación del Pedregal de San Angel, Distrito Federal, Mexico) and doctoral thesis (Vegetación del Estado de San Luis Potosi) led to his scientific research career.

== Career ==
Rzedowski worked at Syntex in 1953. From 1954 to 1959 he was appointed a professor at Universidad Autónoma de San Luis Potosí and director of that University's Instituto de Investigación de Zonas Desérticas. In 1959 he moved to the Colegio de Postgraduados de Chapingo, Mexico as professor-investigator and then in 1961 was appointed professor at the Escuela Nacional de Ciencias Biológicas del Instituto Politecnico Nacional, where he remained until 1984. He then founded the Centro Regional del Bajío, Instituto de Ecología, Pátzcuaro, Michoacán.

At the time he started to work on Mexican floristics, very few studies were published in that field, so he became a pioneer in it. His research has involved extensive fieldwork. Afterwards, he became the most respected botanist in Mexico. He explored a lot of places surveying the local plant life and collected more than 50,000 specimens that can be found in many herbaria. He has also contributed significantly to the taxonomy of Burseraceae and Compositae.

Rzedowski also provided leadership to the botanical community in Mexico and internationally. He was significant in the re-development of the Sociedad Botanica de Mexico and he organized the First Mexican Botanical Congress in 1960. In 1988 he launched the scientific journal Acta Botánica Mexicana.

== Personal life and death ==
In 1954 Rzedowski married Graciela Calderón Díaz-Barriga.

Rzedowski died in Pátzcuaro, Michoacán in March 2023, at the age of 96.

== Publications ==
Rzedowski was the author of Vegetación de México (1971) and the co-editor and co-author of Flora Fanerogámica del Valle de México (1979; 2001, 2nd edition), and of Flora del Bajío y de Regiones Adyacentes (1991–).

== Honors ==
In 1995, he was awarded the Asa Gray Award. In 1999 he was one of the botanists on whom was conferred the Millennium Botany Award. In 2005 he, jointly with Graciela Calderón de Rzedowski, was awarded the José Cuatrecasas Medal for Excellence in Tropical Botany.

The herbaria of Instituto Politécnico Nacional and of Universidad Autónoma de Querétaro are named after Rzedowski, as is also the botanical garden of Universidad Autónoma Agraria Antonio Narro.

The following taxa have been named after him:

- Agave rzedowskiana
- Anthurium rzedowskii
- Arachnothryx rzedowskii
- Bernardia rzedowskii
- Bouvardia rzedowskii
- Bursera rzedowskii
- Canthon rzedowskii
- Cercocarpus rzedowskii
- Commelina rzedowskii
- Crotalaria rzedowskii
- Croton rzedowskii
- Dalea rzedowskii
- Dioon rzedowskii
- Eleocharis rzedowskii
- Euphorbia rzedowskii
- Galium rzedowskii
- Habenaria rzedowskiana
- Jatropha rzedowskii
- Magnolia rzedowskiana
- Pachyphytum rzedowskii
- Pinus rzedowskii
- Platanus rzedowskii
- Psilocybe rzedowskii
- Rzedowskia tolantonguensis
- Schoenocaulon rzedowskii
- Sedum jerzedowskii
