= Samuel A'Court Ashe =

American politician (1840–1938)

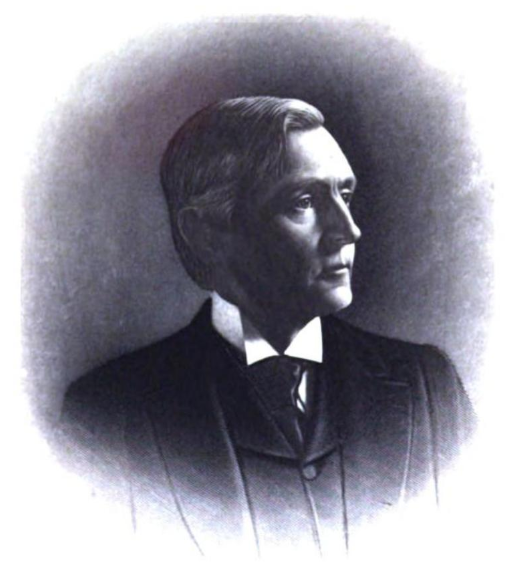
- Born: September 13, 1840; Wrightsville Sound, near Wilmington, North Carolina
- Died: August 31, 1938 (aged 97); North Carolina
- Burial place: Historic Oakwood Cemetery, Raleigh, North Carolina
- Spouse: Hannah Emerson Willard (m. 1871)
- Military career
- Allegiance: Confederate States of America
- Branch: Confederate States Army
- Service years: 1861-1863
- Rank: Captain

Samuel A'Court Ashe (September 13, 1840 – August 31, 1938) was a Confederate infantry captain in the American Civil War and celebrated editor, historian, and North Carolina legislator. Prior to his death in 1938, he was the last surviving commissioned officer of the Confederate States Army. Samuel's father, William Shepperd Ashe (1814–1862), served in the North Carolina state senate and as a United States Congressman. The United Confederate Veterans conferred the title of Brigadier General upon Samuel A. Ashe in 1936 in New Orleans, Louisiana. Ashe is also noted for his booklet on the war titled A Southern View of the Invasion of the Southern States and War of 1861-65.

== Early life ==
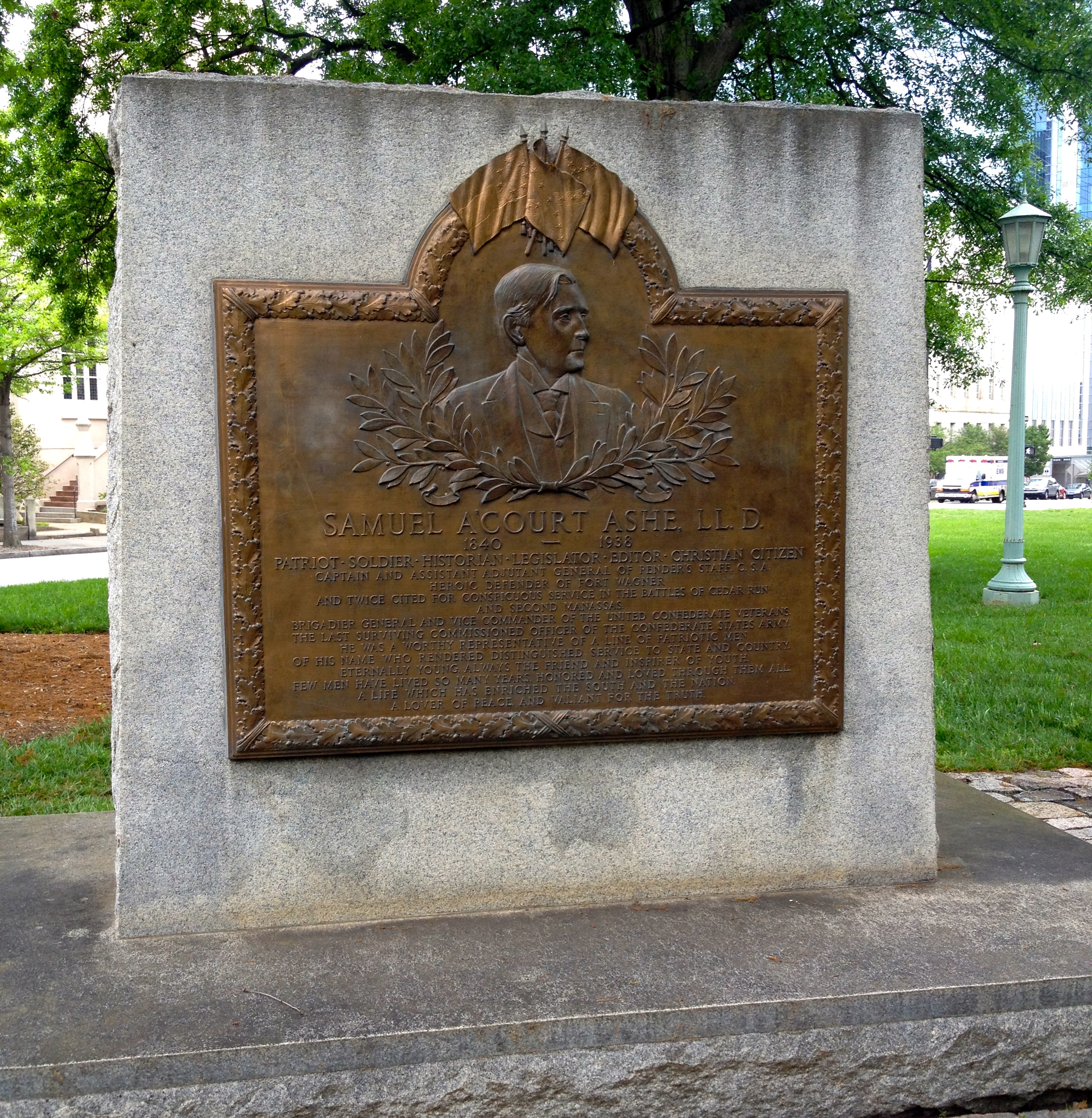
Samuel A'Court Ashe Memorial in Raleigh, NC

Born in Wrightsville Beach, North Carolina, in 1840, Ashe grew up near Wilmington and spent much of his life in Raleigh. He attended the United States Naval Academy at Annapolis, where he met future naval historian and lifelong friend Alfred Thayer Mahan.

== Occupations ==
When the war erupted, Ashe enlisted in the Confederate Army and served for its duration, rising to the rank of captain. Among his duty assignments was serving at Fort Caswell, on the eastern end of Oak Island.

After the war, Samuel married Hannah Emerson Willard in 1871 and had nine children (one of whom was William Willard Ashe, the noted botanist and associate of the United States Forest Service). Samuel studied law in Wilmington, later establishing a law practice there. Active in the Democratic Party, Ashe worked for several government departments and ultimately served in the North Carolina House of Representatives. As a legislator, Ashe revised North Carolina tax laws concerning the resolution of state debts.

Ashe became editor of the Raleigh Daily News, and subsequently purchased the Raleigh Daily Observer, merging the two to become editor of both publications. A prolific writer, he wrote many materials between the period of 1908 and 1935 on the subjects of North Carolina history, the Civil War, and the post-war South. Perhaps Captain Ashe's most renowned publication is his booklet on the war published in 1935 and titled A Southern View of the Invasion of the Southern States and War of 1861-65, in which he addressed the subject of the constitutionality of the South's secession from the United States and other similar topics pertaining to the Confederacy, Abraham Lincoln, and the war.

== Death ==
He died on August 31, 1938, at age 97 and was buried at the Historic Oakwood Cemetery in Raleigh. On September 13, 1940, a memorial in his honor was unveiled on Capitol Square in Raleigh. This monument denotes that he was "a patriot, soldier, historian, legislator, editor, and Christian citizen."

== Bibliography ==
- Wheeler, John Hill (1884). "Reminiscences and Memoirs of North Carolina and Eminent North Carolinians: Genealogy of the Ashe family".
- Ashe, Samuel A'Court, ed. (1906). Biographical History of North Carolina from Colonial Times to the Present. C. L. Van Noppen.
