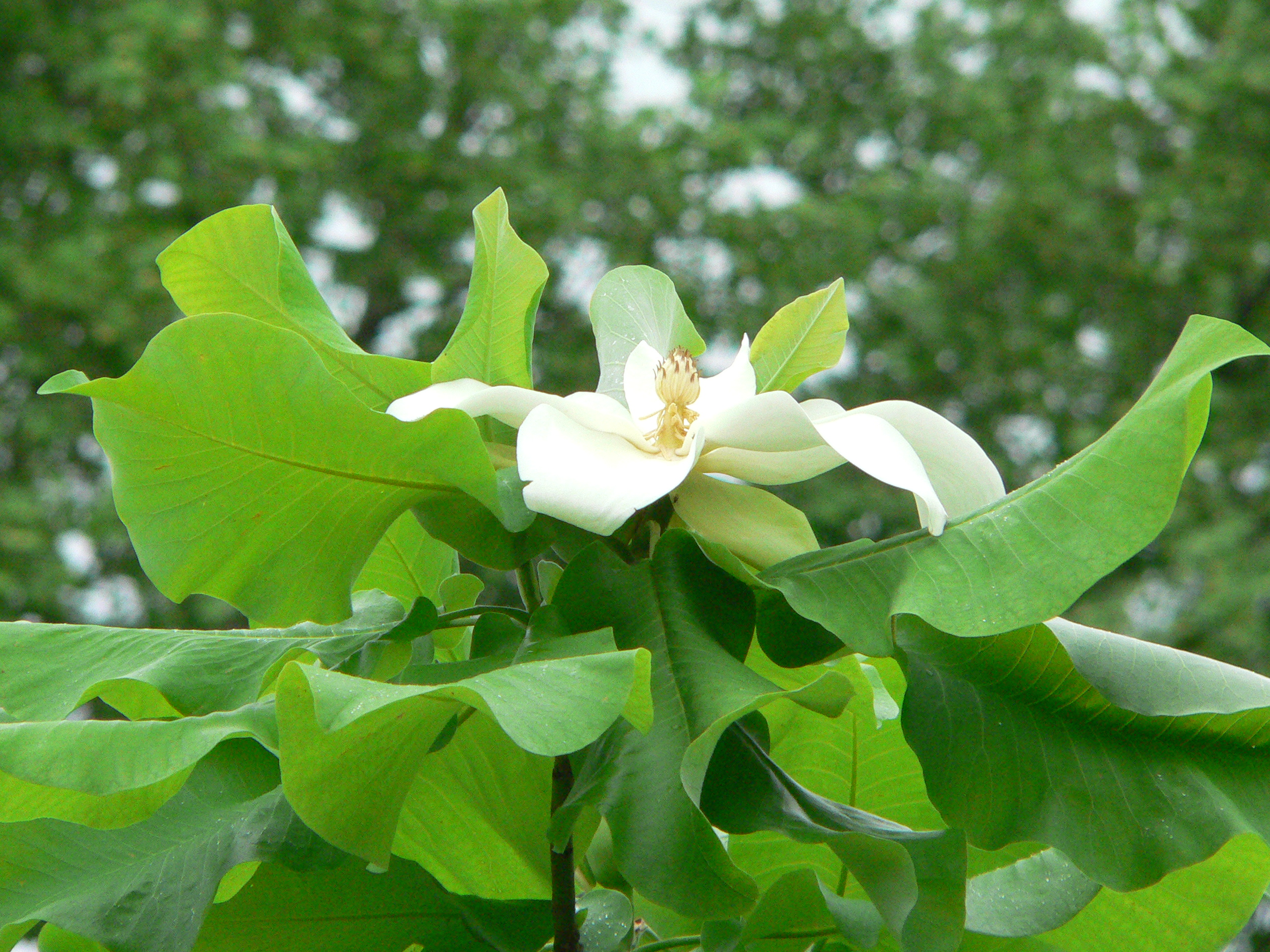

Conservation status
- Near Threatened (IUCN 3.1)

Scientific classification
- Kingdom: Plantae
- Clade: Embryophytes
- Clade: Tracheophytes
- Clade: Spermatophytes
- Clade: Angiosperms
- Clade: Magnoliids
- Order: Magnoliales
- Family: Magnoliaceae
- Genus: Magnolia
- Subgenus: Magnolia subg. Magnolia
- Section: Magnolia sect. Macrophylla
- Species: M. ashei

Binomial name
- Magnolia ashei Weath.

Synonyms
- Magnolia macrophylla subsp. ashei (Weath.) Spongberg; Magnolia macrophylla var. ashei (Weath.) D.L.Johnson; Metamagnolia macrophylla subsp. ashei (Weath.) Sima & S.G.Lu

= Magnolia ashei =

Species of tree

Magnolia ashei is a species of flowering plant in the family Magnoliaceae, endemic to northwestern Florida. It is known commonly as Ashe's magnolia. It is sometimes considered to be a subspecies or variety of Magnolia macrophylla which occurs further north in the southeastern United States, but is now generally considered a distinct species. It was discovered in Okaloosa County, Florida by William Willard Ashe, and named after him by Charles Alfred Weatherby.

== Description ==
Magnolia ashei is a deciduous small tree or large shrub, growing to 10–12 m tall, only about half the height of M. macrophylla. The leaves are large to very large, 17–56 cm long and 10–40 cm wide. The flowers are large, fragrant, creamy white, often with a purple spot at the base of the inner tepals; they are 15–38 cm wide, exceptionally up to 50 cm wide.

== Distribution and habitat ==
This species is endemic to the "panhandle" of Florida, where it grows from sea level up to 50 meters elevation.

== Uses ==
Magnolia ashei is cultivated as an ornamental plant, used as a flowering tree in gardens. Young plants start flowering at an early age, even just 3–4 years old, making it popular in gardening.
