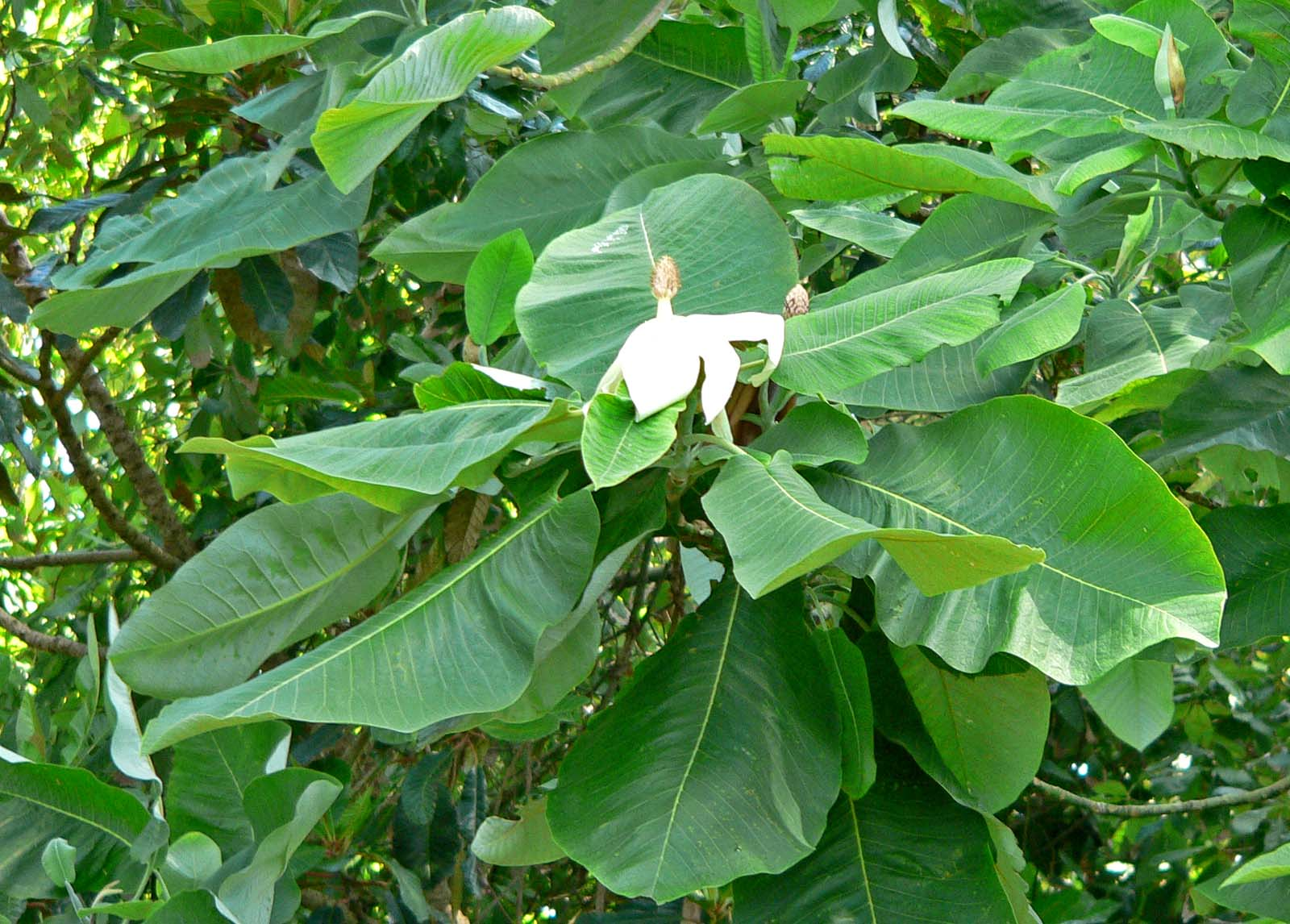

Conservation status
- Near Threatened (IUCN 3.1)

Scientific classification
- Kingdom: Plantae
- Clade: Embryophytes
- Clade: Tracheophytes
- Clade: Spermatophytes
- Clade: Angiosperms
- Clade: Magnoliids
- Order: Magnoliales
- Family: Magnoliaceae
- Genus: Magnolia
- Subgenus: Magnolia subg. Magnolia
- Section: Magnolia sect. Macrophylla
- Species: M. dealbata

Binomial name
- Magnolia dealbata Zucc.

Synonyms
- Magnolia alejandrae García-Mor. & Iamonico; Magnolia macrophylla var. dealbata (Zucc.) D.L.Johnson; Magnolia nuevoleonensis A.Vázquez & Domínguez-Yescas; Magnolia rzedowskiana A.Vázquez, Domínguez-Yescas & R.Pedraza; Magnolia vovidesii A.Vázquez, Domínguez-Yescas & L.Carvajal; Magnolia zotictla A.Sánchez-Gonz., Gut.-Lozano & A.Vázquez; Metamagnolia alejandrae (García-Mor. & Iamonico) Sima & Hong Yu; Metamagnolia dealbata (Zucc.) Sima & S.G.Lu; Metamagnolia nuevoleonensis (A.Vázquez & Domínguez-Yescas) Sima & Hong Yu; Metamagnolia rzedowskiana (A.Vázquez, Domínguez-Yescas & R.Pedraza) Sima & Hong Yu; Metamagnolia vovidesii (A.Vázquez, Domínguez-Yescas & L.Carvajal) Sima & Hong Yu

= Magnolia dealbata =

Species of tree

Magnolia dealbata is a species of flowering plant in the family Magnoliaceae, native to Mexico. It is known commonly as the cloudforest magnolia and eloxochitl. It is sometimes considered to be a subspecies of Magnolia macrophylla, which is otherwise native to the southeastern United States.

== Description ==
Magnolia dealbata is a deciduous tree, growing to average heights of 25 m tall. Larger individuals can reach 40–50 m in height. The flowers are large and white up to 20 cm long. The leaves are broad, reaching 60 cm length. The most critical difference between M. dealbata and Magnolia macrophylla is that M. macrophylla has 50 to 80 carpels in its fruit, while M. dealbata has 80 to 105, with no overlap of the numbers.

== Distribution and habitat ==
This species is endemic to cloud forests in the Sierra Madre de Oaxaca of northern Oaxaca in eastern Mexico, where it ranges from 600 and 1,900 m elevation. More than ten subpopulations have been observed, and the species' estimated extent of occurrence is 2,750 to 3,000 km^{2}. The largest population includes over a thousand trees.

It grows in humid montane cloud forests, alongside Magnolia oaxacensis, Pinus chiapensis, Quercus laurina, Liquidambar styraciflua, and Clethra sp.

The IUCN Red List considers populations identified as M. dealbata in the Sierra Madre Oriental of Querétaro, Veracruz, Hidalgo, Nuevo Leon, Tamaulipas and San Luis Potosí to belong to recently-described species including Magnolia nuevoleonensis, Magnolia rzedowskiana, and Magnolia vovidesii. Plants of the World Online considers these synonyms of M. dealbata.

The species was once thought to be extinct until being rediscovered in 1977.

== Etymology ==
The name eloxochitl was given to the tree by the Aztecs. It is derived from the Nahuatl word elotl meaning "green ear of corn", and xochitl meaning "flower".

== Uses ==
Magnolia dealbata is cultivated as an ornamental plant, used as a flowering tree in gardens. It is also used for timber, and as a traditional medicinal plant for heart conditions, asthma, and stomach pain. The flowers are used as decorations for spiritual and cultural events.
