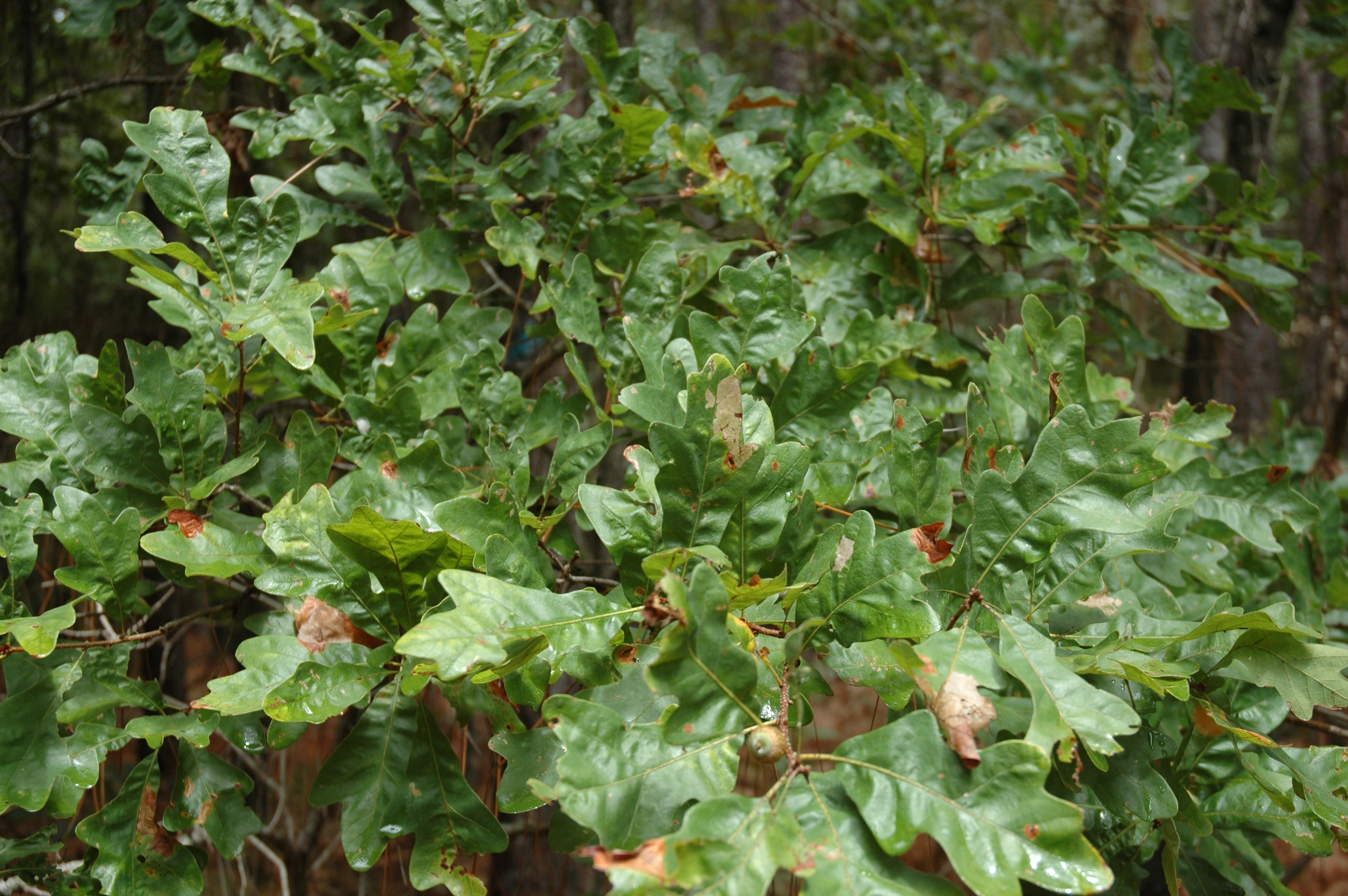

Conservation status
- Least Concern (IUCN 3.1)

Scientific classification
- Kingdom: Plantae
- Clade: Embryophytes
- Clade: Tracheophytes
- Clade: Spermatophytes
- Clade: Angiosperms
- Clade: Eudicots
- Clade: Rosids
- Order: Fagales
- Family: Fagaceae
- Genus: Quercus
- Subgenus: Quercus subg. Quercus
- Section: Quercus sect. Quercus
- Species: Q. margarettae

Binomial name
- Quercus margarettae (Ashe) Small

Synonyms
- Quercus margaretiae var. stolonifera (Sarg.) Ashe; Quercus minor var. margaretiae Ashe; Quercus pandurata Raf.; Quercus stellata subsp. margaretiae (Ashe) A.E.Murray; Quercus stellata var. araniosa Sarg.; Quercus stellata var. margaretiae (Ashe) Sarg.

= Quercus margarettae =

Species of oak tree

Quercus margarettae (spelling variants include Quercus margaretta, Quercus margarettiae, and Quercus margaretiae), the sand post oak or dwarf post oak, is a North American species of oak in the beech family. It is native to the southeastern and south-central United States from Virginia to Florida and west as far as Texas and Oklahoma. There are historical reports of the species growing in New York State, but it has not been seen there in years.

Quercus margarettae is a deciduous shrub or small tree growing up to 12 meters (40 feet) tall. The bark is gray and scaly. The leaves are up to 135 millimetres (5 1/4 inches) long, and bipinnately lobed with rounded lobes. The plant grows in sandy or gravelly soil.

== Taxonomy ==
The species was first described as a variety of Quercus minor (a synonym of Quercus stellata) by William Willard Ashe in 1894. Ashe spelt the name "Quercus minor var. Margaretta". The capital letter implies it was named after a person. The first name of Ashe's wife was Margaret. Article 60.8(b) of the International Code of Nomenclature for algae, fungi, and plants provides that adjectival specific epithets formed from personal names should have the genitive ending of the appropriate gender, with -i- added before the ending when the personal name ends in a consonant. Sources have used Ashe's original spelling "margaretta", or have changed the spelling to "margarettae", "margarettiae" or "margaretiae".

Ashe's variety was raised to a full species by John Kunkel Small in 1903. It is placed in section Quercus.
