= William Willard Ashe =

U.S. forester and botanist

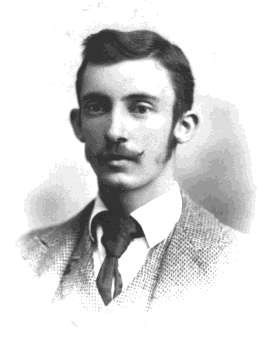
- Born: June 4, 1872; Raleigh, North Carolina, U.S.
- Died: March 18, 1932 (aged 59); Washington, D.C., U.S.
- Resting place: Historic Oakwood Cemetery
- Education: University of North Carolina, Cornell University
- Scientific career
- Fields: forestry, botany
- Author abbrev. (botany): Ashe

William Willard Ashe (June 4, 1872 – March 18, 1932) was an American forester and botanist. He was known as a prolific collector of plant specimens and an early proponent of conservationism in the Southern United States.

== Early life ==
Ashe was born in Raleigh, North Carolina, to Samuel A'Court Ashe (1840 – 1938) and Hannah Emerson Willard. He was the oldest of nine children and grew up on the family's antebellum estate "Elmwood", where he spent much of his childhood exploring the nearby woods and fields looking for natural curiosities. He quickly took to collecting plant specimens, and by the time he entered college, Ashe required a two-story building to house his entire collection. As a young man, Ashe also spent time writing; and along with his brother Samuel, he produced a tract titled "The West End Sun" that included woodcuts made by W.W. Ashe himself. A copy of "The West End Sun" was placed in the cornerstone of the State Agricultural College Building in Raleigh.

Ashe was from a storied southern family. His father was a Confederate captain during the American Civil War, as well as a regarded historian and member of the North Carolina legislature. His grandfather, William Shepperd Ashe (1814 – 1862), was a member of the North Carolina state senate who also served as a United States Congressman from 1849 to 1855. W.W. Ashe was also a descendant of Samuel Ashe (1725 – 1813), the ninth Governor of North Carolina.

== Education ==
Ashe was schooled at home by his mother and great-aunt before entering the Raleigh Male Academy when he was 12. Only three years later, in 1891, he matriculated at the University of North Carolina and graduated with a bachelor's degree that same year. One year later, he received an MS in botany and geology from Cornell University. Ashe also took an interest in ornithology during his college years and amassed an impressive collection of eggs and stuffed birds during that time.

== Professional life ==
He spent most of his professional life working in forestry, though he continued to practice botany in his spare time. He was appointed forester at the North Carolina Geological Survey at the age of 19. He was employed by the survey from 1892 to 1905 and worked with his colleagues there to make North Carolina a model of southern conservation. During this time, he spearheaded a campaign to promote efficient use of the state's resources, and he surveyed the state's forests with Gifford Pinchot. The result of their work was the 1897 report Timber Trees and Forests of North Carolina.

While with the survey, Ashe also took on special projects for the newly formed United States Forest Service. Ashe then joined the service full-time in 1905, and he worked there until his death in 1932. He held several prestigious positions during his tenure with the service, working his way up from forest assistant to assistant district forester and senior forest inspector. He was also skilled in timber lands appraisal. In his capacity as secretary of the National Forest Reservation Commission from 1918 to 1924, he was instrumental in the purchase of the Forest Reserve lands under the 1911 Weeks Act. He later served as the chief of the Forest Service's land acquisition force for the eastern and southern regions of the United States.

Ashe also held positions with other forestry organizations during his time at the service. In 1919, he was named vice-president of the Society of American Foresters. And between 1930 and 1932 he served as the Chairman of the Forest Service Tree Name Committee. He was also an active member of the Torrey Botanical Club.

== Personal life ==
In 1906, Ashe married Margaret Haywood Henry Wilcox (1856 – 1939), a distant cousin and widow, and he became stepfather to her children. He named the species Crataegus margaretta Ashe and Quercus margaretta Ashe in her honor. Ashe was also a lifelong Episcopalian and member of the Democratic Party.

== Legacy ==
Ashe was renowned for his keen eye for botanical detail. He discovered many new taxa and published 510 plant names during his life. To date, the University of North Carolina Herbarium has entered over 2,340 of his collected specimens into their database. Additionally, eight species have been named in his honor and bear the eponym ashei, including Juniperus ashei (Ashe's juniper) and Magnolia ashei (Ashe's magnolia).

Ashe also perfected commercial longleaf pine cultivation, and he published widely in forest economics, management, and research. In total, he produced 167 titles, including works on botany, public parks, and dendrology.

On November 17, 1936, the W.W. Ashe pine tree nursery was dedicated in southern Mississippi within the De Soto National Forest.

== Death ==
William Willard Ashe died on March 18, 1932, in Washington, D.C. He is buried in the Historic Oakwood Cemetery in Raleigh, North Carolina.

== Selected works ==
- Forest fires: Their destructive work, causes and prevention (1895)
- Timber trees and forests of North Carolina (1897)
- Shade trees for North Carolina (1908)
- Loblolly, or North Carolina pine (1915)
