= Toluca Valley =

Valley in Mexico

Coordinates: 19°17′11″N 99°33′34″W

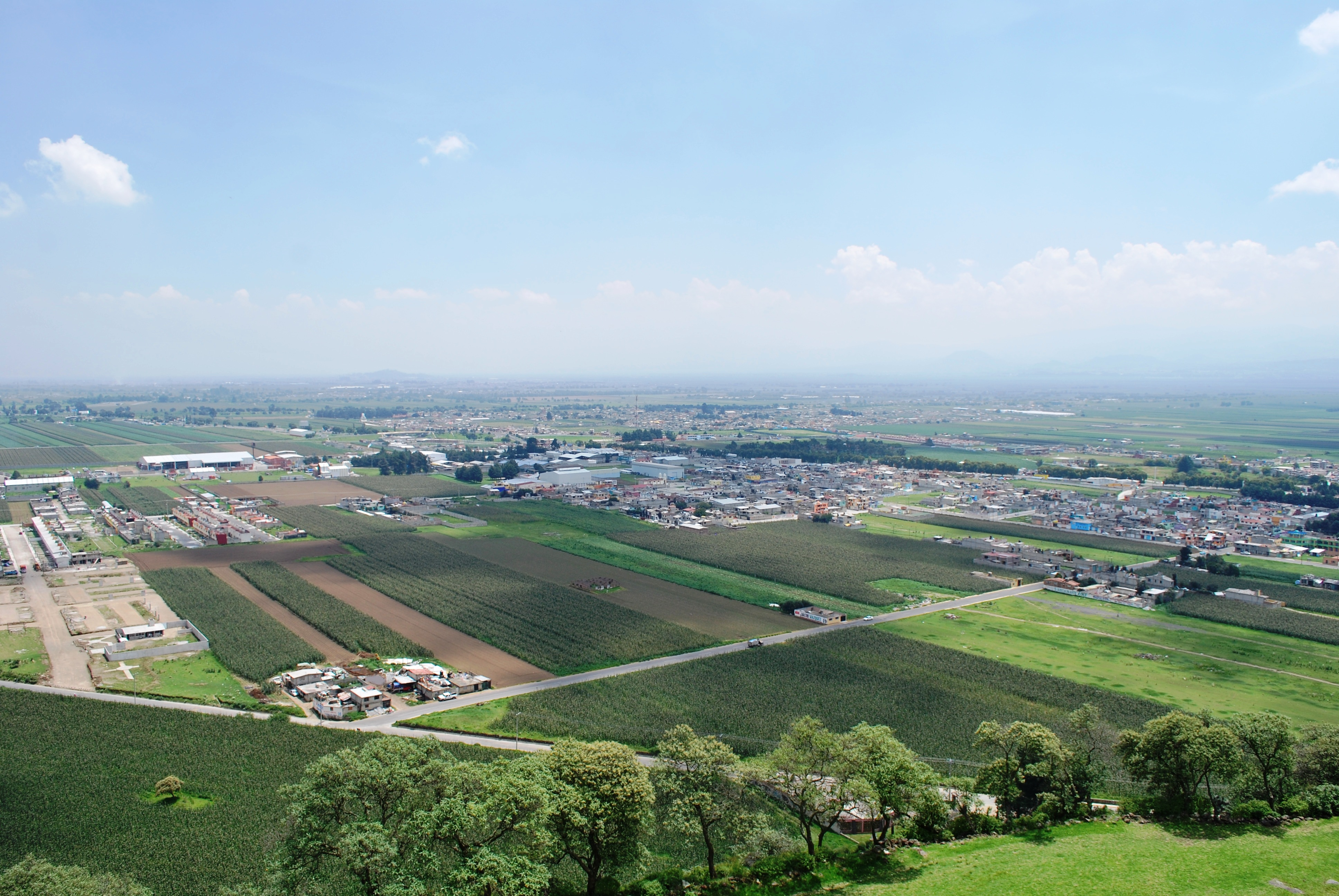
Looking over part of the valley from Teotenango.

The Toluca Valley is a valley in central Mexico, just west of the Valley of Mexico (Mexico City), the old name was Matlatzinco. The valley runs north–south for about 35 km (22 mi), surrounded by mountains, the most imposing of which is the Nevado de Toluca Volcano. It is one of the highest valleys in Mexico and for this reason has a relatively cold climate. Since the 1940s, there has been significant environmental degradation in the valley, with the loss of forests, soil erosion, falling water tables and water pollution due to growth in industry and population. In the pre-Hispanic period, it was a buffer region between the Aztec Empire and Purépecha Empire. From the Aztec period until the 19th century, it was part of the region controlled by Mexico City, but today it is the center of the State of Mexico, which has its capital in Toluca, the main city of the valley.

== Physical geography and climate ==
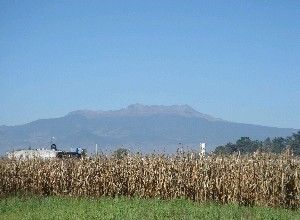
Looking at the Nevado de Toluca from a cornfield

The Toluca Valley is a broad highland valley located immediately west of the Valley of Mexico. It is one of the highest valleys in Mexico with an average elevation of 2,570 meters above sea level ("masl"). The valley is part of the Trans-Mexican Volcanic Belt, with its soils of volcanic origin mostly dating from the Upper Cenozoic. Mountains sides have tertiary volcanic rock, mostly basalt and andesite along with pyroclastic matter and breaches. The valley floor is composed of lacustrine and sedimentary materials. The valley covers an area of about 700 square kilometres, running north south with a length of 35 km. Its width is about 20 km. Its northern border is marked by the Guadalupana Volcano, the Cerro el Aguila and the Sierra Monte Alto. Its southern extension is marked by the Tenango and Zempoala Volcanoes. Its eastern boundary is marked by the Sierra de Las Cruces and La Iglesia mountains and the west is defined by the Nevado de Toluca and the Sierra Morelos. These mountains, along with the elevation of the valley in general cause the area to experience cooler temperatures than the rest of the region.

The most distinctive of the surrounding mountains is the Nevado de Toluca (4,690 m asl) to the southwest. The Nevado is the fourth highest mountain in Mexico at 4,600 m asl, formed by successive eruptions with deposited layers of igneous materials. Its peak has snow most of the year and is surrounded by temperate forests. The mountain has important effects on the climate and hydrology of the Toluca Valley The piedmont is characterized by hills covered by broadleaf forests. On the upper slopes there are conifers. The highest elevations have alpine grasslands, known as Zacatonal. While the area is in the tropical latitudes, its high altitudes along with cold are from the Sierra de Las Cruces and Nevado de Toluca gives the area a semi-cold to cold climate. The average monthly temperature varies between 5°C at altitudes over 3,000 m and 20°C lower in the valley.

The climate is classified as C(w2)(w)bi(g) under the Köppen climate classification which means a sub humid temperate climate with a long summer, winter rain of less than 5%, isothermal with maximum temperatures occurring before the summer solstice. The area has a rainy and dry season with the rainy season extending from mid May to mid October. Most precipitation occurs on the sides of the Nevado de Toluca of up to 1200 mm per year. The valley floor receives an average of 900 mm per year. Almost all precipitation occurs during the rainy season with most coming in June. After this, there is a short dry spell in August before rains return in September.

It is part of the upper course of the Lerma River, which is the main source of surface water.

== Political geography ==
The Toluca Valley is in the southeastern section of the State of Mexico, which accounts for most of the state's territory. This state is the most populous in Mexico with over 14 million people. The state used to center on Mexico City historically, but after this was separated into a Federal District, the political center of the state eventually moved to the valley, with its capital in the city of Toluca. Today, most of the state's population is still on the fringes of the Mexico City metropolitan area, but the second highest concentration of people is in the Toluca Valley. Sixty percent of the valley's population of over 1,350,000 lives in the Toluca metropolitan area. The rest live in the over 400 other communities of the valley. Due to the political shift, the Nevado de Toluca volcano which towers over the valley has become the cultural symbol for the State of Mexico.

== Economy and environmental degradation ==
Until the mid 20th century, the main economic activities were agriculture and forestry, due to large expanses of forest, the valley floors' fertile soils and the Lerma River. Industrialization of the valley began in the 1940s, along with that of the neighboring Valley of Mexico, accelerating in the 1950s and 1960s. The population of the valley grew over four times from 1930 to 2000, with rates significant above those of the rest of the country. Today, the valley is an important industrial area with a high population density with most of the area now urbanized. The workforce of the valley changed from 60% engaged in agricultural activities in 1950 to less than 7% in 2000. Today most are employed in industry and commerce especially in Toluca metro area. Most of the remaining agricultural activity is for subsistence and seasonal, carried out only during the rainy season. The rapid change has led to environmental degradation.

Most of the original wild vegetation is highly exploitable temperate forest, but much of this forest cover has disappeared. Since the latter half of the 20th century more than 10,000 hectares of forests have disappeared, with another 10,000 decimated from their former high density. The Nevado de Toluca National Park was established in 1936 with the purpose of preserving a 51,000-hectare area around the Nevado de Toluca volcano, also known as Xinantécatl. The Nevado de Toluca park, despite its status as a federal reserve has lost half its trees since its establishment, mostly due to illegal logging. Over 75% of the surface has some degree of erosion damage.

Much of the agricultural lands have given way to housing developments, mostly built for workers in the area's industry. Urban growth has been chaotic with no planned system of roads or of public transport resulting in traffic jams, especially in Toluca. In the 2000s, there have been infrastructure projects to bypass the city of Toluca and make it easier to cross the valley and connect it better with Mexico City, west into Michoacán and south to Cuernavaca.

The growth in industry and population has put significant pressure on fresh water supplies of the areas as well as water pollution problems. Excess pumping of groundwater has led to subsidence problems with an estimate sinking of over two meters since 1962 and a confirmed loss of about forty cm from 2003 to 2008 Investigators at California Institute of Technology, Institute of Technology zero in on remote sensing The pumping and the exploitation of fresh water springs to send potable water to Mexico City has led to diminishing surface water. There is an estimated yearly deficit of between 56 and 89 million cubic liters of water, which has caused the disappearance of springs in Almoloya del Río, Alta Empresa and Ameyalco and even dry spots in the Lerma River in the dry season. The loss of water has led to the disappearance of the shallow lakes and wetlands that line the Lerma River in areas such as Almoloya del Río with has destroyed entire aquatic ecosystems. Of the 10,705 hectares registered in 1943 only 3,000 today flood during the rainy season. The dried lagoon lands have become farmland. In addition the quality of the remaining water has been deteriorating since the 1940s with the influx of urban and industrial wastewater. The Lerma River and other channels have been used as drainage channels so the pollution level is very high, surpassing governmental standards for "water suitable for recreational use, conservation of flora and fauna and industrial uses." Concentrations of heavy metals are a significant problem in the Lerma River above the Alzate Dam.

== History ==
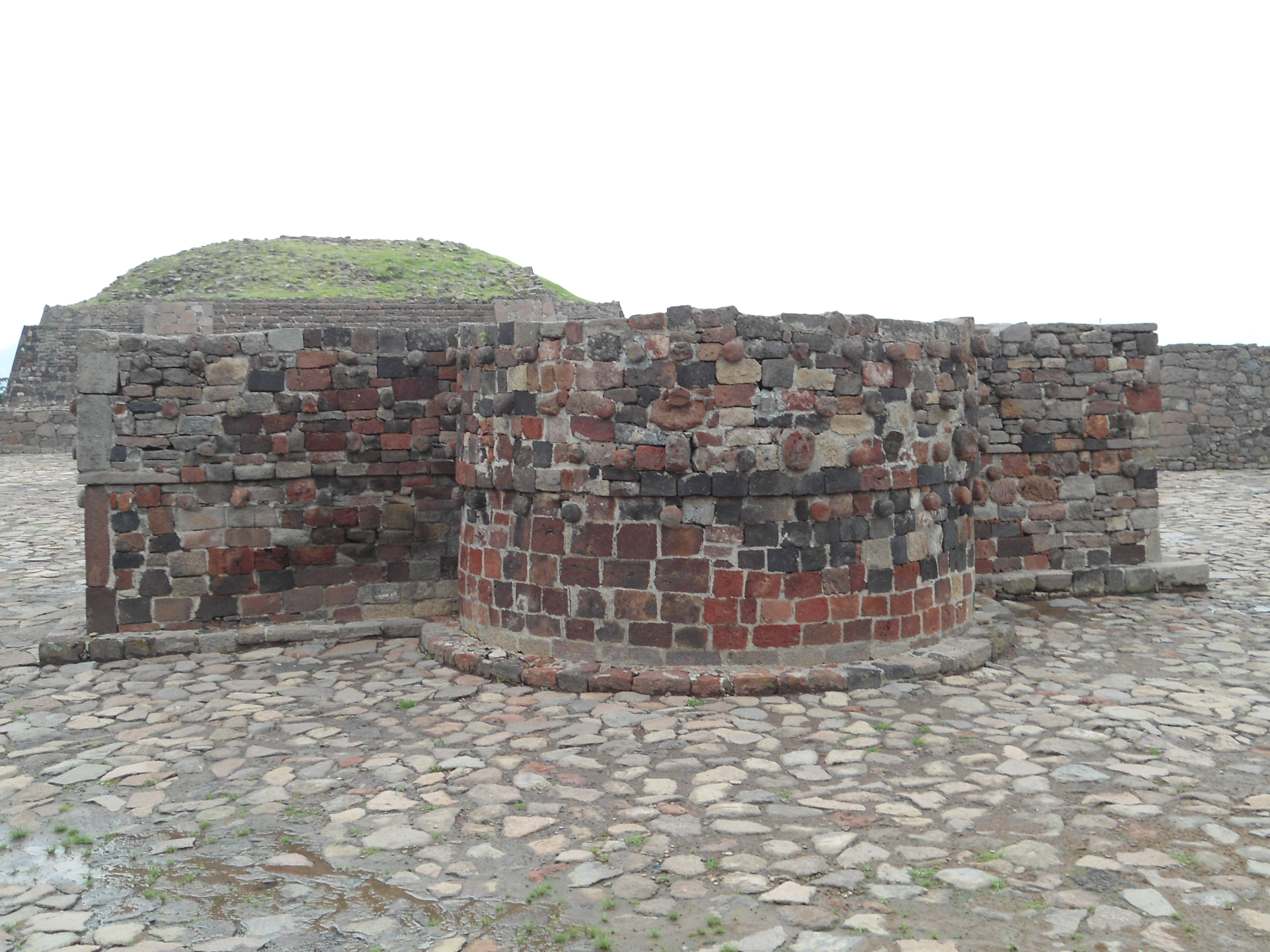
One of the structures of Calixtlahuaca

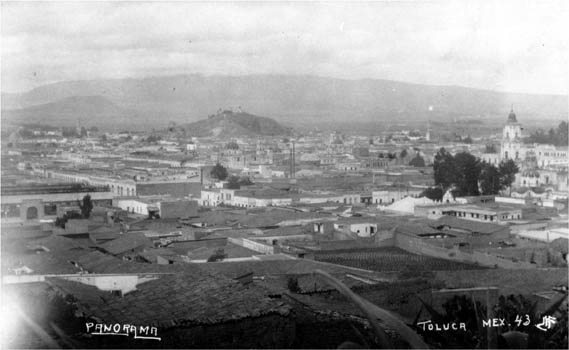
View over the city of Toluca in 1943

Human inhabitation of central Mexico probably began around 12,000 BCE. By the 12th century CE, various ethnicities inhabited the valley. Pre Hispanic, especially pre Aztec history of the area is scarce primarily because the Aztec destroyed many documents of the prior Tepanec Empire when they came to power. One historical document is the Codex García Granados from the early colonial period. It categorizes events of the Toluca Valley into three periods: the "legendary period," the reign of Tepanac king Tezozomoc, and the Aztec period.

There are two important archeological sites in the valley. On the south end is Teotenango. It was founded near the end of the Teotihuacan period by a group now called the Teotenaca. Later, the Matlazinca conquered and expanded it. The city existed for about 1,000 years, being abandoned only after the Spanish Conquest of the Aztec Empire.

Calixtlahuaca is in the north of the valley, just north of present-day Toluca, and dates from the Toltec period. By the late 15th century, it was a powerful city state that controlled much of the Toluca Valley and was the main target of Aztec conquest.

In the Post Classic period (900-1519 CE), the valley was a complex linguistic mosaic with speakers of at least four languages, Matlatzinca, Mazahua, Otomi, and Nahuatl. Aztec mythology mentions Matzalinco in stories related to their migration to the Valley of Mexico, and probably refers to Nahuatl speakers who settled in the Toluca Valley in the 13th century. Five towns in the valley are mentioned more than once in native histories: Cuahuacan, Malinalco, Matlazinco, Teotenanco, and Xilotepec, indicating that they were important settlements from well before the Aztec conquest.

Much of the Toluca Valley was probably part of the earlier Tepanec Empire, based in Azcapotzalco, with its height around 1370. A number of Toluca Valley towns are listed as Tepenac vassals. The historic record in regards to pre-Aztec Toluca area is not clear because the Aztec destroyed many documents and, from 1428 to 1470, Toluca Valley settlements do not figure prominently in Aztec records. The names of both Tollocan (Toluca) and Matlatzinco apparently are used in records to refer to the same area, but it is not known if they referred to the same city/state. By the eve of the Aztec conquest in 1475, it is clear that they were two different city-states.

Initially, the Aztec Empire mostly ignored the Toluca Valley, until the Purépecha Empire began to make inroads in the mid-15th century. Most of the valley was conquered by Aztec emperor Axayacatl. The Tizoc Stone depicts the emperor Tizoc defeating a warrior from the area. The first wave of conquest was in the Mazahua region in the north of the valley in 1473, followed by the conquest of Matlazinco/Tollocan in 1475. Toluca Valley town names begin to appear in Aztec records, and Matlatzinco was renamed as Calixtlahuaca. In 1476 or 1477, the Aztecs confronted the Purépecha armies on the western edge of the Toluca Valley but were decisively defeated. Rebellion broke out in the Toluca Valley, and Axayacatl returned to reconquer the people.

Tenochtitlan administered this area more directly than other parts of the Empire, with client states created on the Purépecha border. Toluca became the administrative center for the valley. Migrations from the Valley of Mexico into the Toluca Valley were encouraged. There was some repression of rebellions under later emperor Ahuitzotl, but there was no major military activity in the valley again until the Spanish conquest.

At the time the Spanish conquered the Aztec Empire, the Toluca Valley was a tribute-paying area and buffer zone between the Aztec and Purépecha empires. Gonzalo de Sandoval conquered most of the area for the Spanish along with Otomi allies. Hernán Cortés' cousin Juan Altamirano was given dominion of the Toluca Valley. Franciscan missionaries came soon after, such as Martin de Valencia, Juan de Tecto, Juan de Ahora, and Pedro de Gante, who established missions and the first school called San Antonio de Padua. Spanish colonial territorial rule was based on the pre-conquest jurisdictions. Former city-states were defined as cabeceras (head-towns). The former Aztec empire became the audencia of Mexico; it was centered on Mexico City and expanded over the Toluca Valley, and further south and west into the modern states of Guerrero and Morelos.

=== 19th-century to present ===
Following Mexican independence, the next major political change for the valley was in the mid-19th century, when the State of Mexico was divided into various new states, and the Mexico City area was designated as the Federal district. This process gave the State of Mexico is current shape. Its political and cultural center was moved to the Toluca Valley, where the city of Toluca was made its capital. Since then, the political, economic and cultural development of the valley has focused on this city.

Despite degradation from extensive development following population increases, there are areas of great natural beauty. About 3.5 million visitors come annually, mostly from Mexico. These include parts of La Marquesa Park, El Nevado de Toluca, Zacango Zoo, Sierra Morelos Park, Tecula and the Lagunas de Zempoala. The volcano was once a sacred site under earlier religions. It is a cultural symbol for the valley and the State of Mexico.

The area also has significant colonial architecture, particularly hacienda houses, churches and former monasteries; and mansions of the Porfirio Díaz era. Many of these are now operated as museums and other cultural establishments.

== Biology: Center of origin of the potato late blight pathogen ==
The Toluca Valley is recognized by plant pathologists as the center of origin of potato late blight pathogen, Phytophthora infestans. This pathogen is infamous for having triggered the Great Irish Famine in the mid 1840s.
