= Nevado de Toluca National Park =

National Park in Mexico

Coordinates: 19°6′20.14″N 99°45′23.57″W

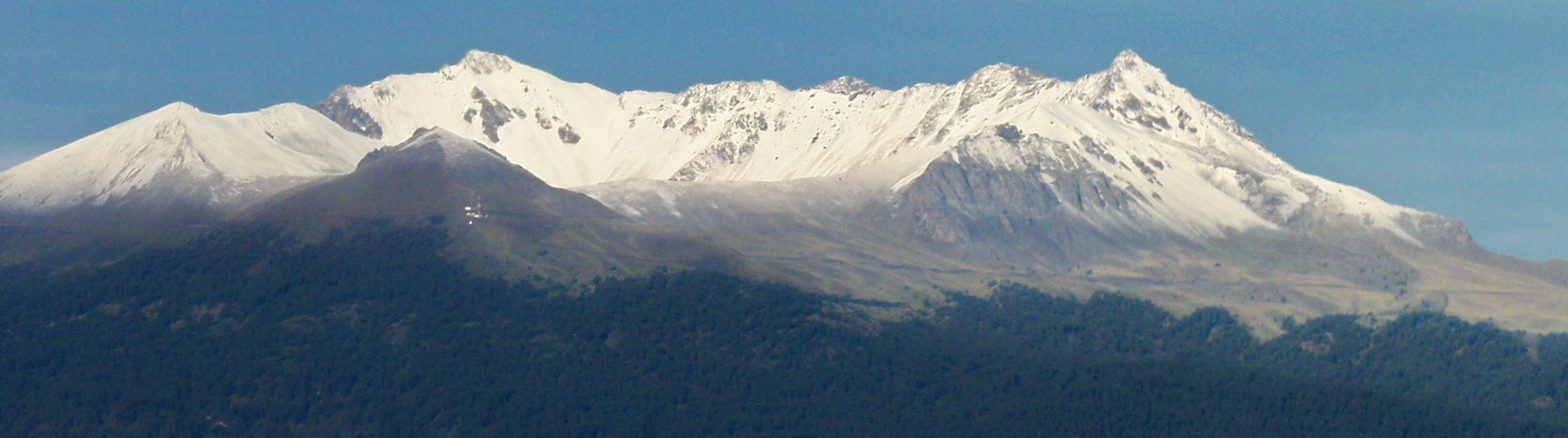
View of the peak of the volcano

The Nevado de Toluca National Park is located southwest of the city of Toluca, Mexico State. It was decreed a park in 1936, primarily to protect the Nevado de Toluca volcano, which forms nearly the park's entire surface and is the fourth highest peak in Mexico. It is 45 km from Toluca and 135 from Mexico City. The park was established with the aim of conservation, but the park is under increasing pressure from the growth of the Toluca metropolitan area as well as from illegal logging done by local communities who need the income. The volcano has been long extinct and has a large crater in which are two shallow lakes. The crater and lakes are popular with visitors from Mexico State and Mexico City, especially when there is snow. There are a number of archeological sites in the park, including the lakes themselves, which contain numerous offerings of copal and other items that were deposited during the pre-Hispanic period. The park offers activities such as hiking, mountain biking and horseback riding as well as limited skiing facilities. Due to its altitude, the summit of the Nevado is significantly colder than the surrounding area. The park was closed indefinitely in August 2025 after an accident.

== History and conservation issues ==
The Nevado de Toluca National Park (NTNP) was established in 1936, with the aim of preserving a 51,000-ha area surrounding the Xinantécatl, or Nevado de Toluca volcano.

This park is one of the most important protected areas in Mexico. When the park was created, the lands were not expropriated by the federal government and they continued to be used as ejido, communal and private lands with restrictions. The decree contained provisions to encourage those with lands here to plant with trees. In the 1930s, the park covered an area of 54,000 hectares, but now it covers only 17,000. Much of the lost land was forested which has diminished the area's ability to replenish local aquifers.

In the remaining park lands, more than half of the original tree biomass has been lost. The rural population which lives in and around the park has been involved with agriculture, illegal logging, mineral and soil extraction here. From 1972 to 2000, the forest cover of the park was analyzed. Although the total forest area has remained more or less the same, the density of the forest has changed significantly. Density in fir and broadleaved forests have remained stable but large areas of the forest dominated by pine trees have lost density so that most are now rated as being semi-dense or fragmented forests. The reason for this is that pine trees can fetch up to US$90 on the market. Many rural communities can no longer make a living with agriculture due to declining soil quality.

Most of the damage to the park's lands has come from illegal logging, grazing, illegal mining and damage done by visitor's automobiles, especially in the crater of the volcano. Illegal logging has had the most detrimental effect. The park overall is subject to an annual deforestation rate of 0.5%, but over 13,000 of the parks 17,000 hectares show some degree of disturbance in its ecosystem, such as new meadows being created where forests have been cleared. Agriculture has diminished in the park proper but trout farms have appeared. In areas where there is still forest, most of this forest is more sparse. Until 2000, about 40% of dense pine forests were lost to logging. Another problem that the trees being cut are the healthiest, leaving the weakest and sick behind, making the remaining forests susceptible to pests and diseases. The deforestation of the park follows the general trend of this heavily populated area, were 100 hectares of wild lands are lost due to development. The metropolitan area of Toluca has over 1,350,000 people, four times the population it had in 1930 and continues to have population growth rates above average for Mexico. Industrialization has been very intensive here since the 1940s, which has led to ecological consequences in the Toluca Valley. In recent decades 10,000 hectares of forests have disappeared as well as bodies of water such as the seasonal lakes of the Lerma River and numerous fresh water springs due to over pumping of groundwater. Soil acidity and erosion are serious problems.

Aside from logging, the park faces other problems due to the large population that lives near it. Mining in Mexico State, mostly of sand and gravel, is concentrated in the area around the volcano and it is known that these materials have been mined illegally in the park itself. There are a number of roads in the park with are almost exclusively used by trucks which take out illegally mined sand and gravel with at least eight illegal open pit mines. While the area is legally only supposed to be forest, mining sand and gravel is relatively easy as it is near the surface. Some of these mines are on ejido land. Local government officials claim that they have been closing mines but environmental groups state that the practiced is tolerated by officials. Other problems are due to the many visitors the park receives, which can be as high as 10,000 per day. This includes the illegal dumping of trash and damage to the crater area by automobiles which had been allowed to drive onto the soft sandy soil here.

In 2008, part of the park was closed to allow for the recuperation of the forests there. More than 20% of the park is considered to be highly damaged, mostly in the higher elevations due to automobiles and grazing by livestock. Since July 2008, cars, motorcycles and ATVs have been forbidden to enter the crater area due to the damage they cause here. Visitors to the crater must now walk two to six km from the parking area outside the crater. There are two routes from the parking area to the crater, a longer, flatter one and the Paso del Quetzal, which is considerably steeper. Cattle are also forbidden to enter the crater area. The damage to the crater area has been deemed "critical" by a number of experts. It is unknown how long the restrictions will last. In 2010, it was suggested that it would be necessary to declare the park a biosphere reserve, which would give the area more legal protections.

== Park area ==
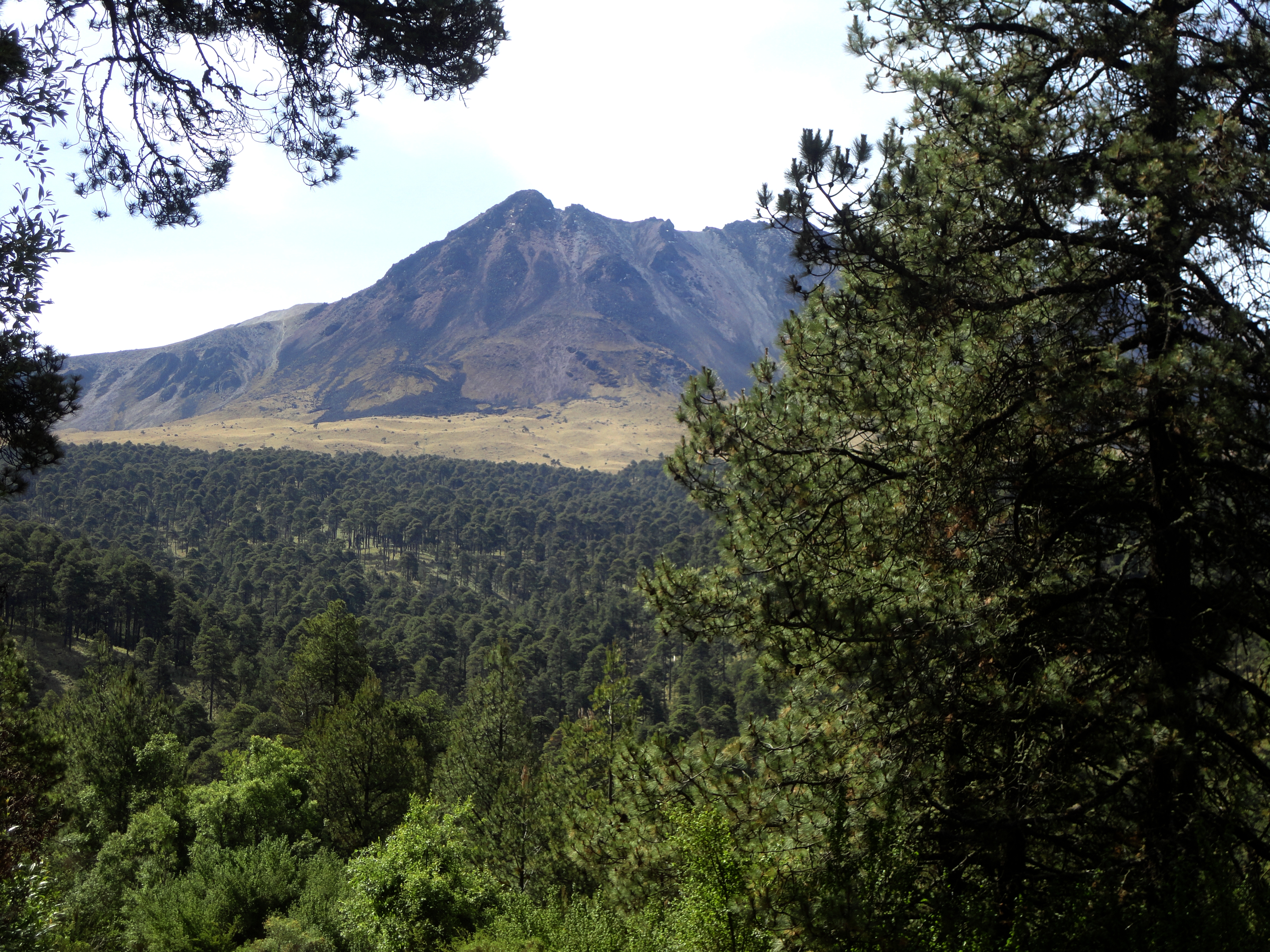
View of the volcano from the trailhead

The park extends over 51,000 hectares, and includes parts of twelve municipalities principally those of Toluca, Zinacantepec and Calimaya. Most of the park is at least sparsely forested with firs, pines and broadleaved trees dominating. Firs are mostly found at the lower levels of the park in an area known as the Peña Ahumada in the northeast section and in some higher levels areas just under the tree line. Most of the broadleafed trees are found in the piedmont area at the lowest elevations. On the slopes are large extensions of pine trees. Above the tree line up to the crater the area is dominated by alpine meadows and grasslands. These plant communities are an important reserve of endemic species of local and regional importance. Animal life includes opossums, coyotes, squirrels, reptiles, rabbits, and birds.

The southeast portion has deep valleys from which flows the Chontalcoatlan River toward the Balsas River. The volcano's watersheds feeds a number of freshwater springs and streams, but the capacity of this watershed is being compromised the erosion and deforestation. The erosion has formed ravines with steep sides and 15 cm deep, which does not allow for the seepage of water into the subsoil. This is one of the reasons why a number of springs in the area have dried up. Often these ravines are also often filled with trash. Each year two springs are lost due to the lowering of water tables in the area.

== The volcano ==
The park is named after the feature it is meant to protect, the Nevado de Toluca or Xinantecatl volcano, with the main entrance in the community of Las Raíces, Temascaltepec. From there a road winds to the top of the volcano for 21 km. The volcano has long been extinct and is Mexico's fourth tallest peak at 4,690 meters above sea level. The volcano with its forest around it is considered to be the most representative natural landscape of the State of Mexico. Its Nahuatl name, Xinantecatl is translates as "naked lord", a reference to the fact that the top of the volcano is above the tree line with only rock and grassland and devoid of snow most of the year. However, some dispute this, stating that the name means "Bat Mountain", "Nine Mountains" or "Nine Waters/Springs". Its name in Matlatzinca is Nro’maani Nechhútatá "House of the God of Waters" and in Otomi it is called Tastobo "White Mountain".

== The crater ==
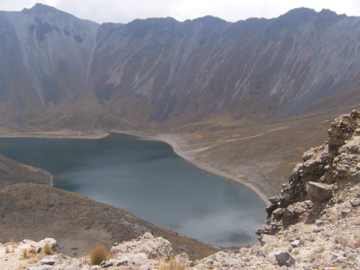
View of the Laguna del Sol

At the top of the mountain/volcano is a large elliptical crater which measures 2 by 1.5 kilometers. This crater consists of a relatively flat floor with two small lakes surrounded by peaks which rise as high as 500 meters on the jagged edge of the crater, forming nearly vertical walls in most parts. The crater floor is at 4,558 meters above sea level, formed by rock that seals the opening of this long-extinct volcano.

The lakes in the crater are the main attraction. This is the only volcano in Mexico with crater lakes. These lakes are among the highest of their type in the world. The two lakes are called the Laguna del Sol (Lake of the Sun) and the Laguna de la Luna (Lake of the Moon). The Lake of the Sun is larger and deeper. The water extends hundreds of meters deep is clear with green tones. The Lake of the Sun has blue tones. In these have been found a number of important archeological discoveries, which are related to ceremonies that were performed here in the pre-Hispanic period. They are not extremely deep but they are very cold. Fishing and scuba diving can be practiced here, but the latter is recommended only with experts due to the cold and the high altitude. The water levels of the lakes have dropped because of higher temperatures and evaporation rates in the most recent decades.

One reason this crater is popular with visitors is that it is the only one in Mexico which can be reached by automobile. A dirt road winds its way up the rugged sides of the volcano for 48 km and ends very close to the crater. The weather at this altitude is cold for most of the year, with high temperatures varying between 4 and 14C. The summit area can be snowy from November to March, and is sometimes good for off-trail cross-country skiing, but the park closes during the heaviest snowfalls. Since the closing of the crater area to motorized vehicles in 2008, visitors now drive to a point outside the crater which has a gate, café and shelter. From there one can walk 6 km on the relatively flat road or 2 km on the steeper Paso de Quetzal. Because most who visit the top of the volcano are not accustomed to the cold, the park provides emergency shelters in most parts of the park as well as patrols. Visitors must leave the crater area at 5pm to descend before dark.

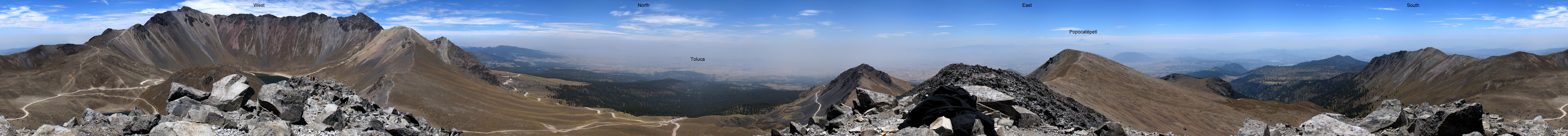
360° panoramic view from crater rim of Nevado Toluca, 120 km to the east the Popocatépetl rises out of the clouds

== Archeological sites ==
There are 18 registered archeological sites in the park, as this was a ritual center during pre-Hispanic periods. Bernardino de Sahagún wrote about the lakes as a place where the indigenous held ceremonies and sacrifices. The lakes themselves are considered to be two sites, as a large number of offerings, especially copal, were deposited in the lakes. These deposits can be found all over the lakebed as the burning copal was set adrift on the lakes' waters until it sank. Other objects have been found such as ceramics and sculpted stones. Divers used to sack many of the pieces found here but now authorities carefully monitor those who dive.

Most of the other sites are found on the crater's walls and peaks. One of the sites is called Xicotepec which is at the top of the Cerro de Ombligo. Principally green obsidian blades and multicolored ceramic has been found here. On the north side of the crater is Pico Sahagun, with ceramic pieces, Picos Heilprin North and South in which various types of objects have been found, and El Mirador, which is thought to be related the marking of the zenith of the sun. A stele found here seems to indicate this. The site at the highest altitude is Pico Noreste at 4,130 meters above sea level. It is a small platform with drainage on which has been found highly deteriorated ceramic pieces. On the west side if the Cerro Prieto Cave, which is really a rock shelter which is more than 60 meters high. Not only does it contain evidence of pre-Hispanic visits but also has been a shrine to the Archangel Michael since the colonial period.

There have been intermittent archeological excavations here with the most recent occurring in 2010 sponsored by INAH which found artifacts dating from the epi-Classic (650–900 CE) and Post-Classic (900–1200 CE) and showed that the crater was a meeting place for astronomer priests to predict the growing season.

== Activities ==
Most visitors to the Nevado de Toluca are from Mexico City and the State of Mexico. The park has a number of sporting facilities, including numerous paths for mountain biking, hiking, ATV's and horseback riding. There are picnic and camping areas. The park is popular with athletes training for major competitions such as the Olympics because of the altitude. Permission to scuba dive in the lakes must be obtained from Mexico State parks agency; however, the agency stresses that the activity is undertaken at one's own risk.

Although modern facilities are not available, cross-country and downhill skiing can be practiced when the weather conditions are right. The park has a shelter, a family inn and an alpine refuge with a communications tower. On the nearby mountain of Cacalotepec, also within the park, there are some skiing facilities including a ski house. Other nearby mountains with skiing are the Gordo Volcano, La Calera and San Antonio mountain, but these are not as high as the Nevado. However, the most popular activity in this park is to ascend the volcano when there is snow, if severe conditions do not close the park. Anywhere from 2,500 to 10,000 people per day visit just to experience the snow.

In the 1990s and first half of the 2000s, there were efforts to build a 19 lane ski resort on the north side of the volcano itself. However these efforts have been resisted by local residents concerned about losing access to their lands.
