= Teotenango =

Pre-hispanic fortified city in the Valley of Toluca

Coordinates: 19°06′31″N 99°35′50″W

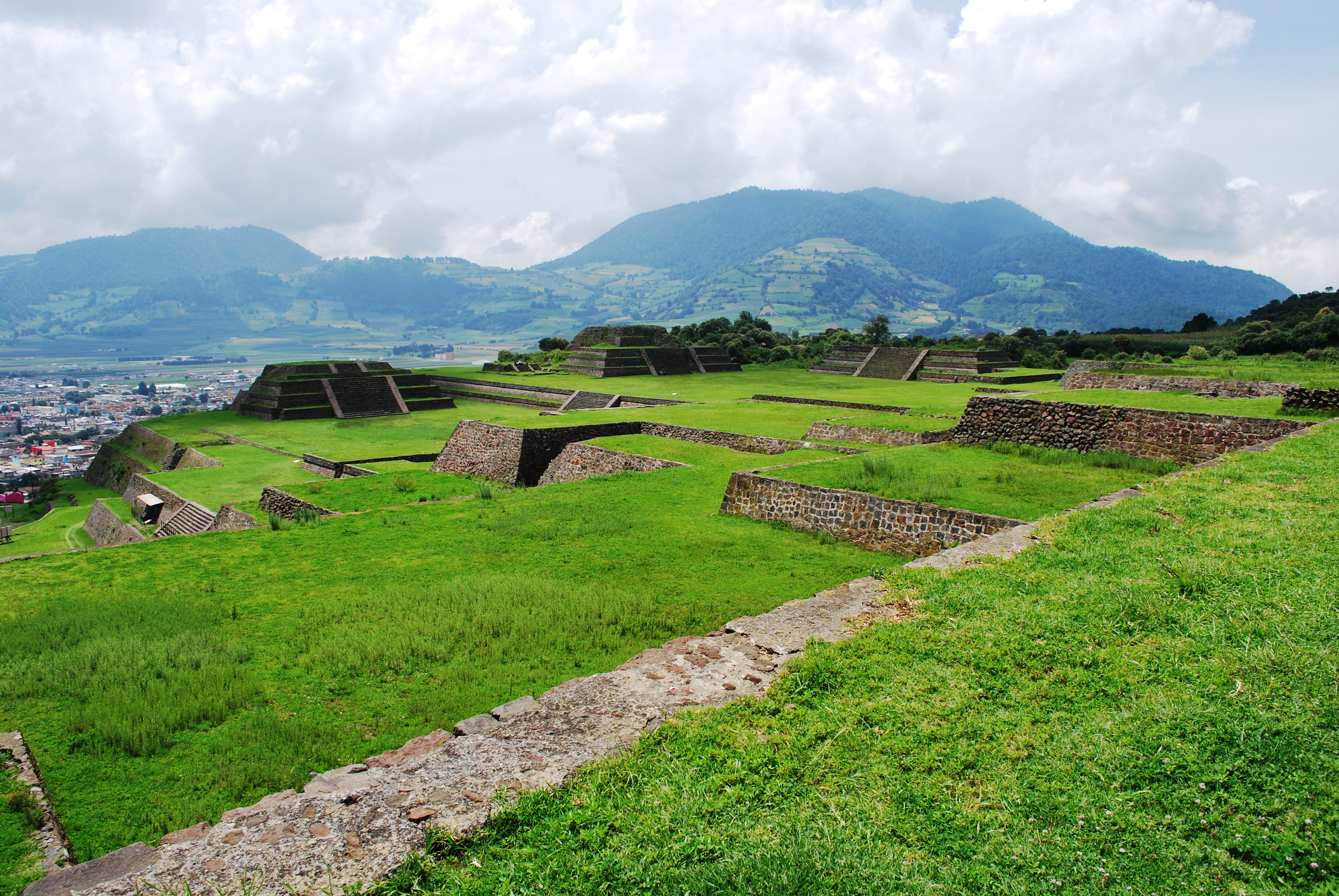
Overlooking part of the site with Matlatzinco Valley in the background

Teotenango was an important pre-Hispanic fortified city located in the southern part of the Valley of Toluca. It was initially founded during the last stages of the Teotihuacan civilization by a group generally referred to as the "Teotenancas." Later, the Matlatzincas conquered the city and expanded it. The city existed for about 1,000 years, being abandoned only after the Spanish Conquest of the Aztec Empire.

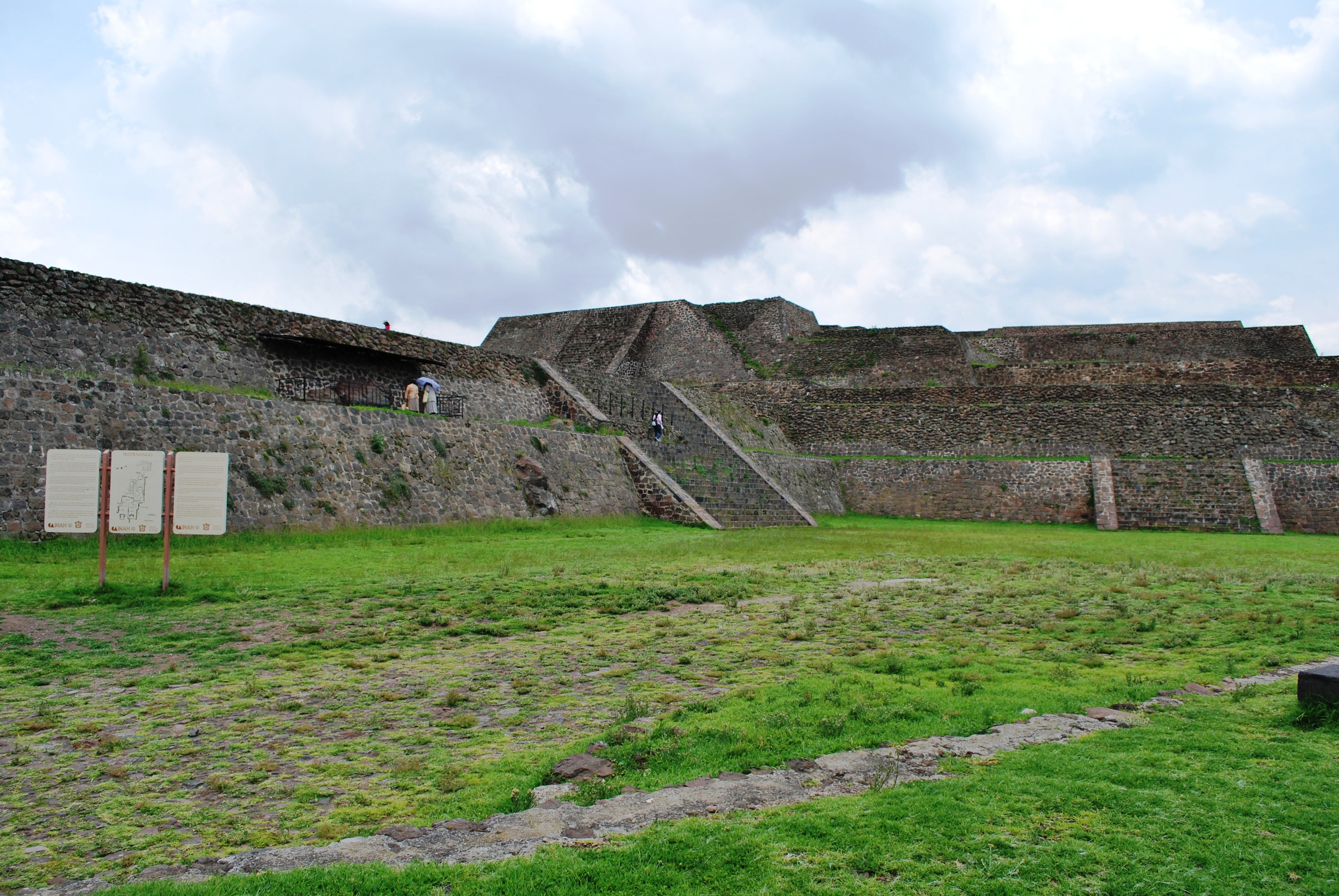
Main entrance to the ancient city

The name Teotenango is derived from three Nahuatl words: "teotl" (god, sacred, divine, authentic or original), "tenamitl" (wall, fence or fortification) and "co" (place or in) which lends itself to different translations such as "in the place of the divine wall," or "in the place of the original fortification" or "in the place of all of the gods." However, "teotl" began to be used to distinguish this pre-Hispanic site from the town that was constructed in the valley below by the Spanish after the Conquest. This is confirmed by the Teutenanco Chronicles, written in 1582, but the Original Chronicles of Chalco-Amaquemecan state that the site was also known as "Cozcuauhtenanco" (walled place of the buzzards) due to the Teotenaca-Matlatzinca military order that protected the city.

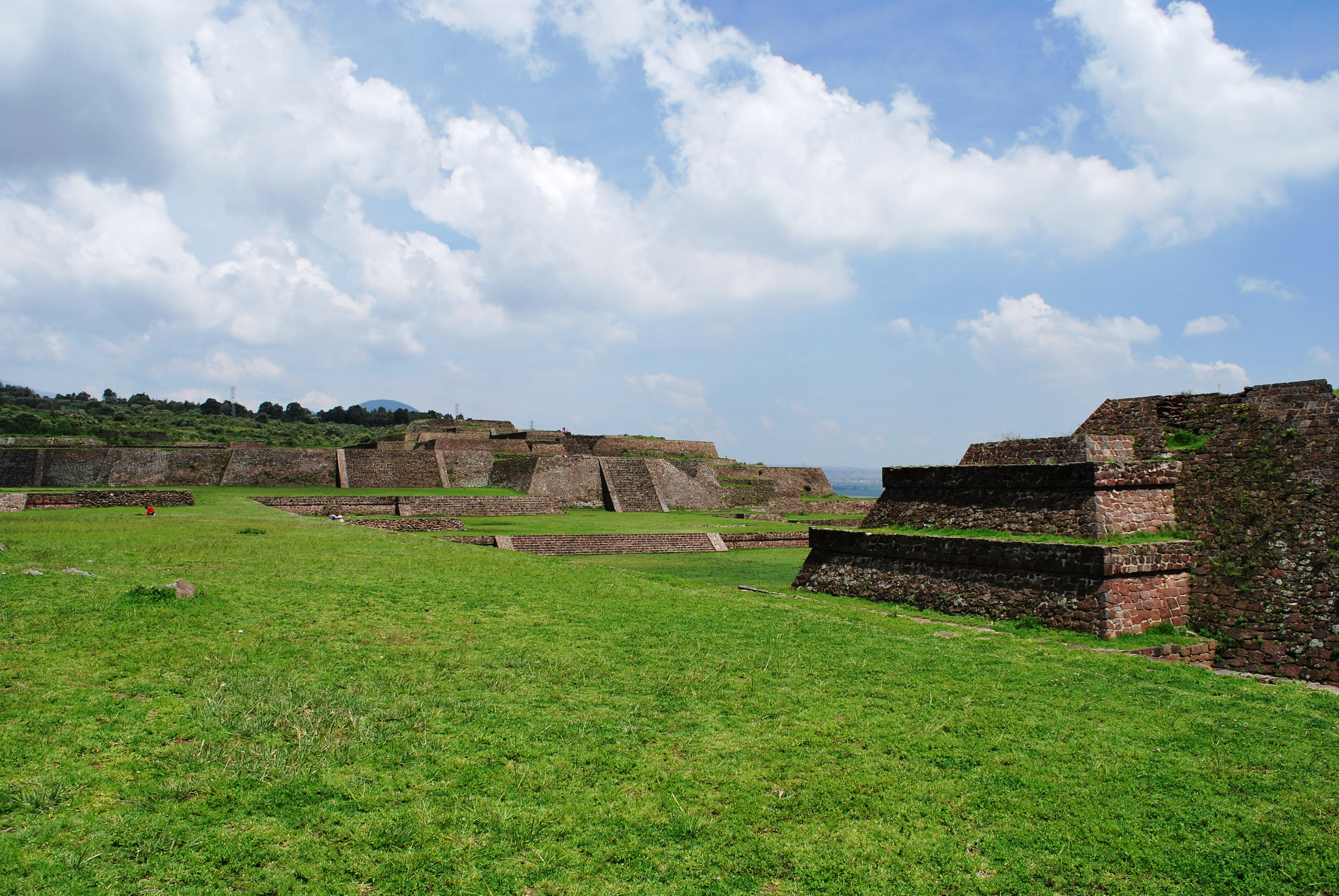
Northwest portion of the excavated site

At its height, the city was densely population with a main road about 1,400 meters long, pyramidal platforms, palaces, a ballgame court, formidable defenses, drainage and water delivery systems. All around the site there are naturally protruding rocks containing petroglyphs with various signs and symbols. However, only a fraction of the site, mostly the northeast section which contained the ceremonial center, has been excavated and preserved.

The site is located on top of a large hill known as Tetépetl, which is located just west of the modern town of Tenango de Arista at a height of 2,700 meters above sea level. It is 25 km south of the Mexico State capital of Toluca, in a sub-valley of the Valley of Toluca named the "Valley of the Matlatzinco" by the Spanish, due to the dominance of this ethnic group here.

== Tetepetl Hill ==
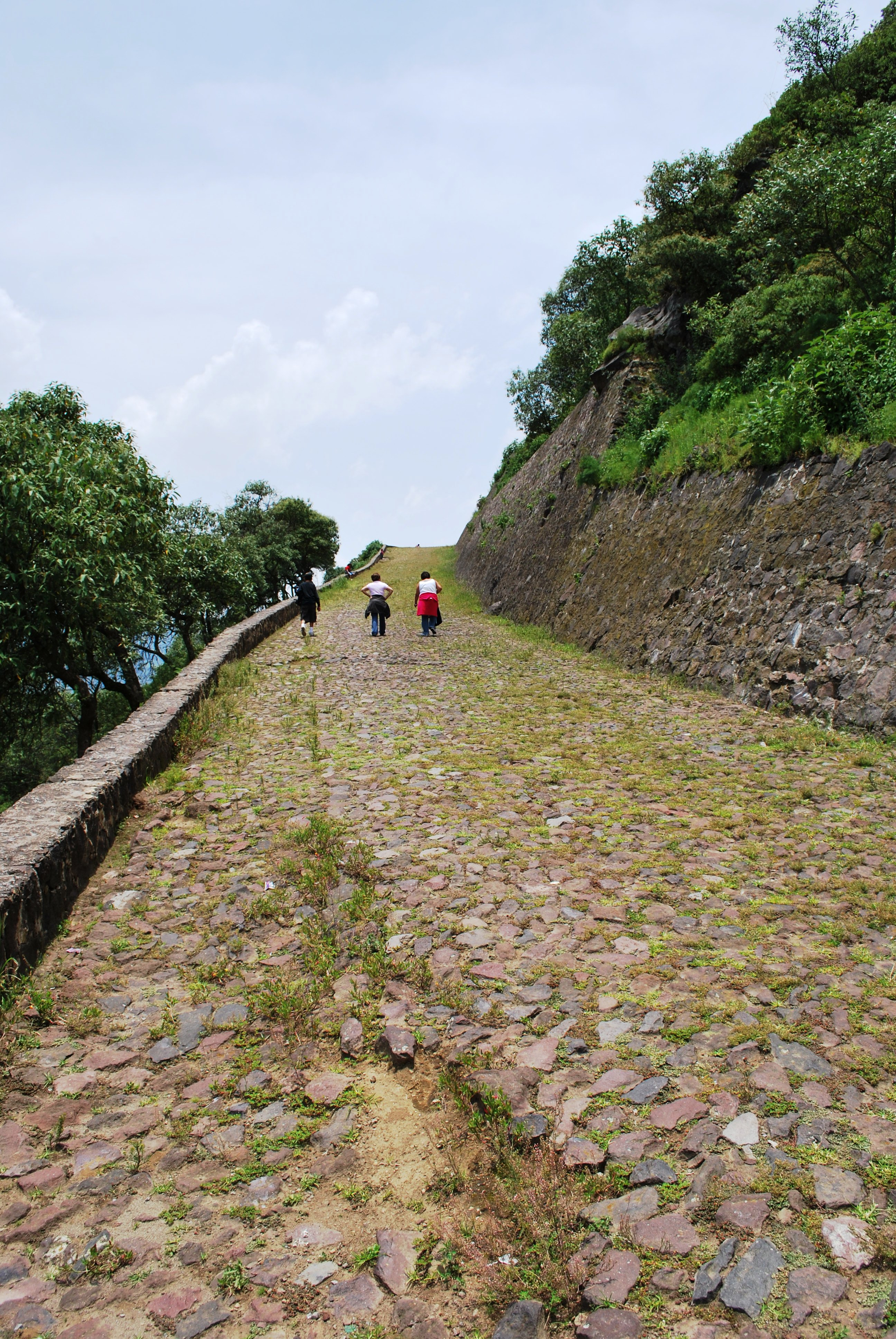
less than half of the path leading to the site from the valley below

Tetepetl Hill is a sharp rise from the Valley of the Matlatzinco running along the west side of the modern town of Tenango de Arista in the State of Mexico. It forms an elongated mesa, with steep slopes on the north and east sides, varying in height from 70 to 250 meters that serve as natural defenses. While the surface of this mesa is 16.5km2, only about 2km2 in the extreme northeast of the mesa was inhabited. With the exception of this corner of the mesa, the entire hill is covered by a layer of dark gray solidified lava, the result of a volcanic eruption that occurred approximately 10,000 years ago. This makes most of the mesa difficult to cross and impossible to farm. To make the city possible, the northeast corner needed to be significantly modified by terracing and filling in low areas. The mesa contains no rivers, but there are a number of fresh-water springs which served as the ancient city's water supply.

== History of Teotenango ==
The high plains in the center of modern Mexico, called the Mexican Plateau or "altiplano", is one of the most important areas of Mesoamerica. The altiplano extends over what is now the Distrito Federal, most of the states of Puebla, Tlaxcala and Mexico State as well as parts of the states of Morelos and Hidalgo. Sophisticated cultures were developed by peoples such as the Nahuas, the Tlahuicas and the Matlatzincas.

The Valley of Toluca is in the altiplano, to the west of the Distrito Federal in Mexico State. From early pre-Hispanic times, this valley was an important settlement area for a number of ethnic groups, whose economic and cultural development was strongly influenced by the natural resources that existed here. The Valley of Toluca was also an important gateway to the tropical lowlands to the south and west. Trade routes through the valley brought valued commodities such as salt, tropical fruits, semiprecious stones and ocean products such as shells. Later, after the conquest of the valley by the Aztec Empire, it became an important point of control for tribute goods coming to the capital of Tenochtitlan. It was also important as a staging area for the regular wars between the Aztecs and the Purépecha (in what is now Michoacán) as possession of much of the western valley was in dispute.

Teotenango is located in the far southern part of the Valley of Toluca. This area was initially settled and developed during the end years of the Teotihuacan civilization. The site experienced five periods of occupation and development, extending over 1,000 years and ending when the Spanish forced the resettlement of the population to the valley floor below.

Occupation of this area did not begin on Tetepetl Hill but rather at a location on the valley floor on the north side of the hill. This settlement has been named Ojo de Agua by archeologists. It was founded by Otomí people who were joined and strongly influenced by emigrants from the falling Teotihuacan civilization. These people are now referred to as the Teotenancas. Objects from this part of the site show very strong similarities with objects from Teotihuacan and date from 650 to 750 C. E. This is considered to be the first stage of the development of Teotenango.

The second stage is dated from 750-900 C.E. show simultaneous occupation of both the Ojo de Agua site and the northern edge of Tetepetl Hill, by the same ethnic group. The first constructions of the Teotenango site date from this period, including the temazcal, structures 2C and 3C and some structures that lie under structures in Conjuntos A and C. The reason the settlement moved from the valley floor to the mesa was due to natural defenses that the mesa provided. Constructions here still are mostly of dwellings of adobe and still show strong Teotihuacan influence indicated by two inclined walls supporting a vertical one.

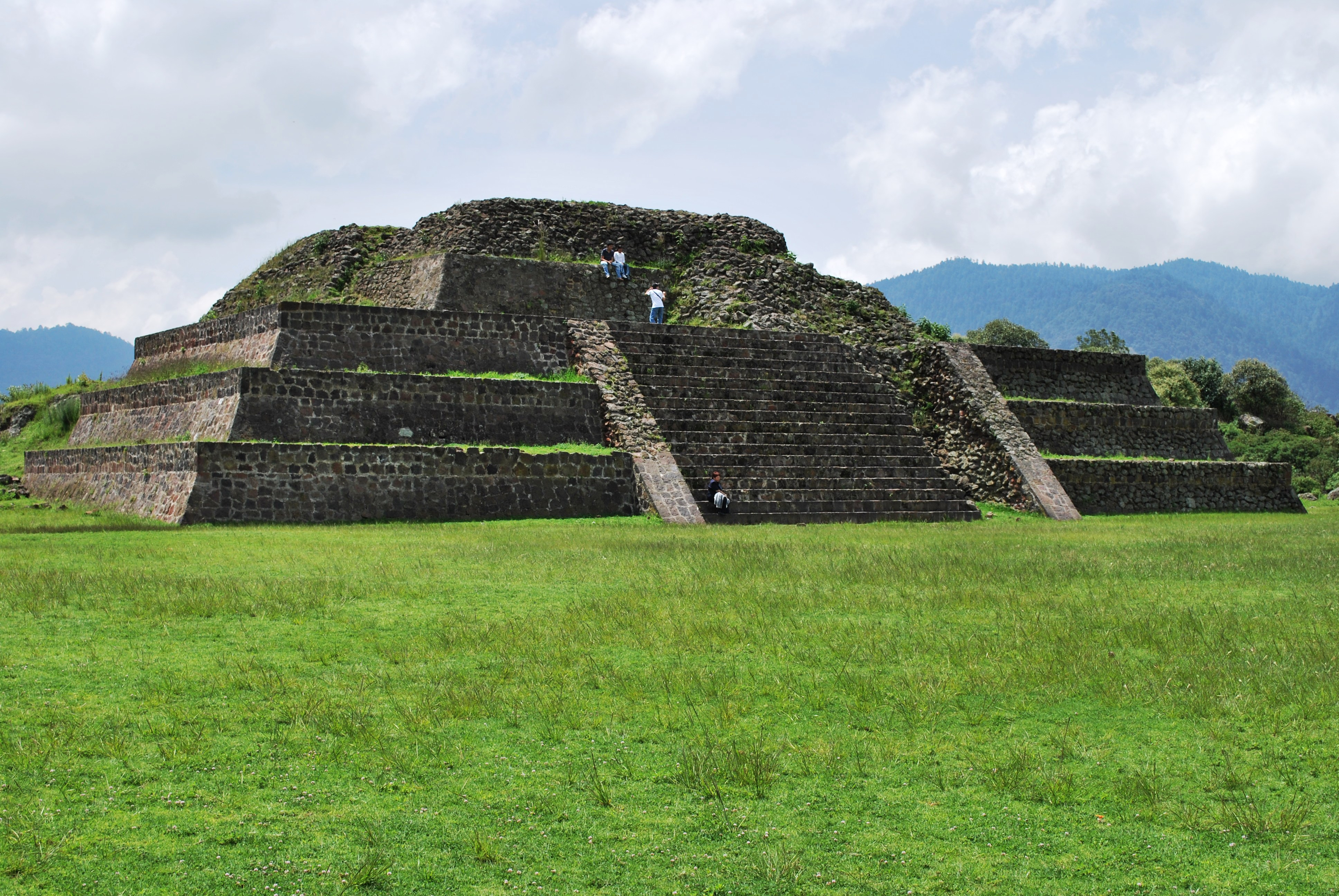
Pyramid of Conjunto B

During the third stage (900 – 1162 CE), most of the currently visible structures of the ceremonial center, such as the pyramidal bases for temples, were built. Of these constructions, the ball court and the Serpent Base stand out. Some residences were also built.

The beginning of the fourth stage (1162-1476) is characterized by the conquest and takeover of the city by the Matlatzincas. They added some small constructions to the ceremonial center, and amplified some other structures, but are mostly credited with the construction of the city's massive defenses, such as the wall on the west side. During the time the city's population grew significantly, with residential areas spreading toward the south. The Matlatzincas extended the domain of this city to include the entire Valley of Toluca, which major outposts in Toluca, Calixtlahuaca, Tenancingo.

The fifth and final stage (1474-1550 C.E.) is characterized by the conquest of Teotenango by the emperor Axayacatl and subsequent Aztec occupation of the city and the valley. Some Aztec architectural influence is felt with the best examples being Building 1C, and the narrow staircase built into the western defense wall. It also includes the initial stages of resettlement of the population of Teotenango to new Spanish colonial village of Tenango de Valle (also known as "Village of Teotenango") on the valley floor below. This resettlement was completed by 1550, after which the site above was completely abandoned.

== Excavation of the site ==
The abandoned site remained mostly exposed and vaguely known about locally since colonial times. But it was not until 1969 when archeologist Wanda Tomasi presented a plan to excavate the site. She contacted the Instituto Nacional de Antropología e Historia (INAH) center for the region, at the time directed by Román Piña Chan, who decided to convert Tomasi's idea into a state project to gain finance and support from then-governor Carlos Hank Gonzalez. In the 1970s, Piña Chan succeeded in getting five million pesos for investigation, exploration, land purchases and the construction of a site museum, with aims of making the site accessible to the public. Since the State of Mexico invested the money in the project, INAH ceded management rights to the state, with the condition that research and security of the site would continue. The project was able to excavate less than half of the two km^{2} site, limited to the ceremonial center concentrated on the northeast of the mesa. Little is known of the residential areas that extend to the south and east.

Another area that was left unexcavated was the initial Teotenanca settlement, Ojo de Agua, on the valley floor on the north side of Tetepetl Hill. Using sonar in the 1970s, a small platform was detected about two meters underground and a few objects were uncovered and put on display at the site museum. However, lack of funding prevented any serious work here, but did allow for measures to protect the area from damage, although it still remains private property.

== Excavated structures at the site ==
The site consists of five major groupings of buildings called "conjuntos" labeled A, B, C, D, and E. Conjunto D is more commonly referred to as the Plaza del Serpiente (Plaza of the Serpent). Conjunto E is more commonly referred to as the ball court area. Buildings within each of the conjuntos are denoted with numbers, such as 1A, 1B, etc. The archeological site has more than forty excavated and at least partially restored monuments.

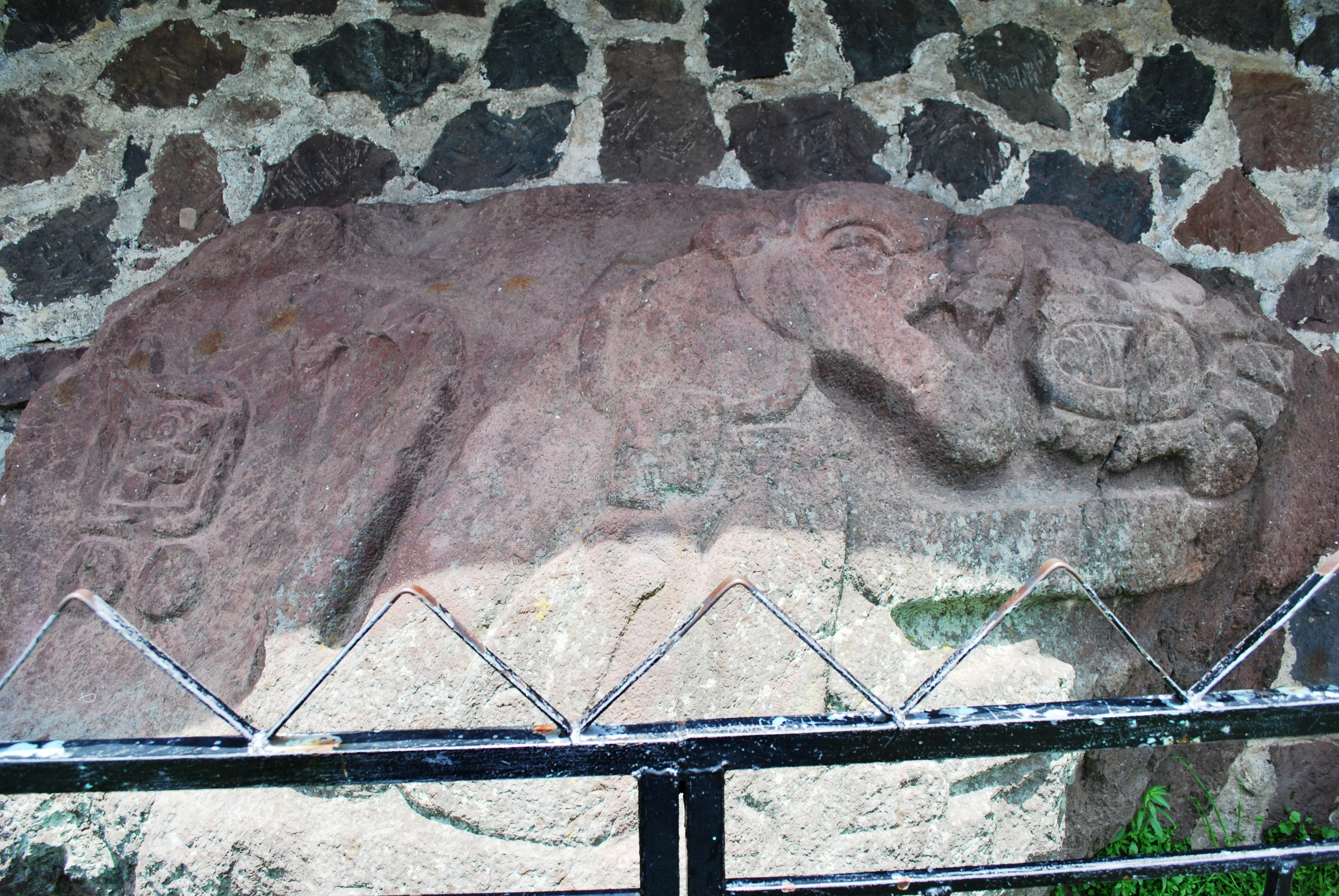
Jaguar relief at main entrance to city

The main entrance to the city is through the Plaza of the Jaguar, which lies on the hill on the north side just below the level of the rest of the city. From this plaza a series of stone steps takes one up to the city level. The Jaguar Relief shows as seated jaguar, wearing a medallion around its neck and it is in the process of eating a kind of flower or heart. To the left of this image is the representation of the date marker Two Rabbit and to the right is the date marker Nine House. One of the interpretations of this set of reliefs is that it represents the occurrence of an eclipse. The Jaguar represents some kind of earth monster eating the sun, represented by the flower or heart figure. An eclipse did indeed occur on the date Two Rabbit Nine House on the Aztec calendar.

Conjuntos A and B each consist of a plaza with a temple pyramid or pyramid base with one or more smaller buildings associated with it. Both are located at the extreme east of the excavated zone, near where the hill's steep slopes to the valley floor begin. Conjunto B contains a nearly complete pyramid with a small altar in front and various platforms for dwellings. Some of the structures here show Otomi architectural influence. Buildings here were roofed with thick layers of mud reinforced with poles and had stucco floors which contain evidence of cooking/heating fires.

Conjunto C is a small group of buildings just behind to west of the Jaguar relief and the main stairs entering the city. This area contains some of the oldest exposed structures at the site.

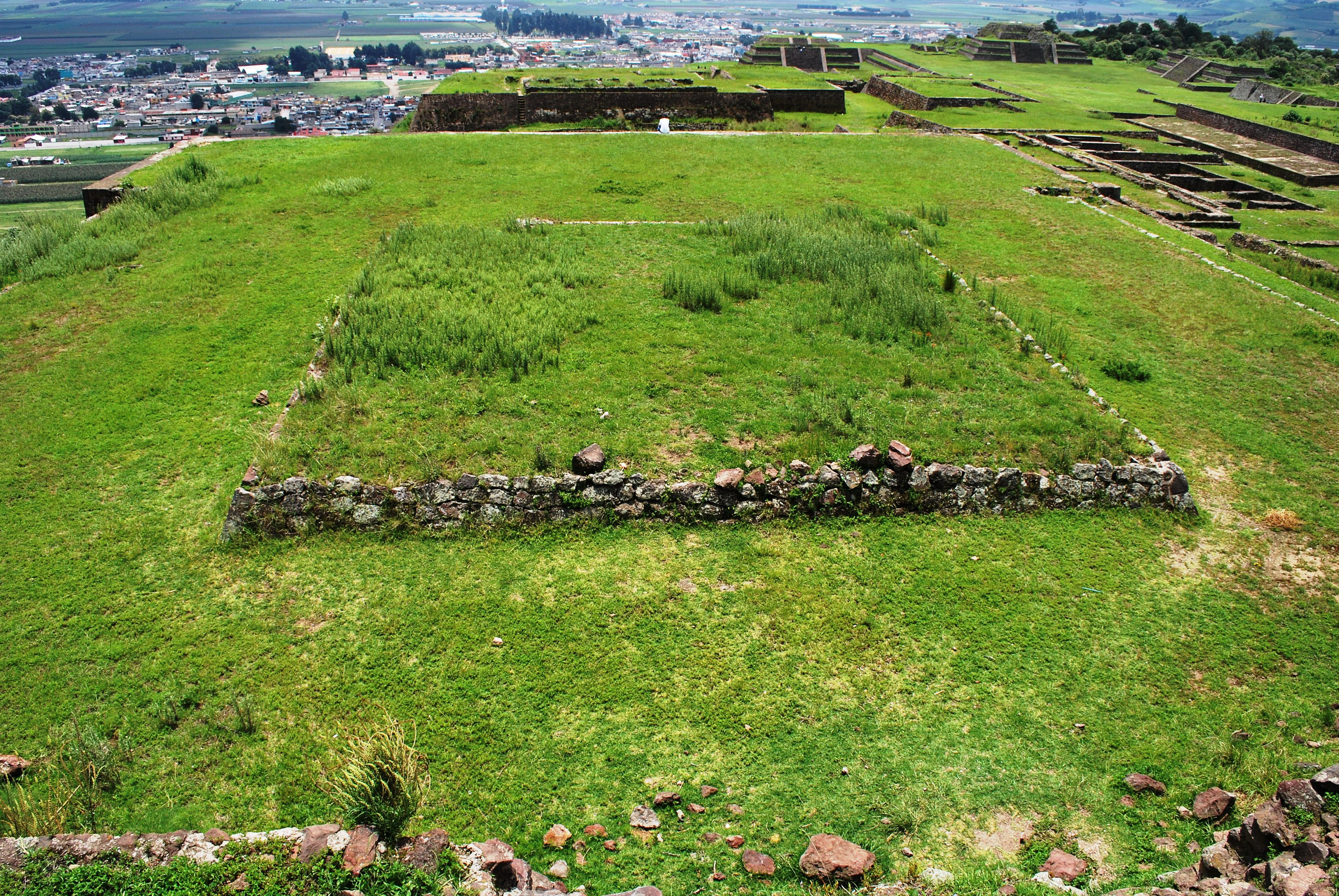
On the Serpent Base looking east over the Plaza

The Plaza de la Serpiente (Conjunto D) is located in the western part of the excavated area. The largest structure here is the Serpent Base which measures 120 m long by 40 m wide. The name of the plaza and the building come from a sculpted stone found at the northeast corner of the Serpent Base, formed in the shape of a snake's head. A smaller structure, denoted 1D, is a base 90 cm high divided into various rooms with interior patios. These patios are square and contain drainage system for wastewater. The structure also contains an entrance hallway and pits for fires in the interior.

The Calle de la Rana (Frog Street) is located in the far northwest of the excavated site. It is a cleared area which lies at a lower level than the structures surrounding it. Through it, access was gained to the Plaza del Serpiente. Its name comes from a sculpture of a frog done in a rock from the hill which juts out. The Matlatzincas built their western defensive wall along this street.

The defensive walls of the city were mostly constructed by the Matlatzincas, who conquered the city in 1200 C.E. The largest and most intact are located on the west side of the city which reach heights of 10 meters and are up to 1.5 meters wide. These were constructed without mortar and took advantage of the contours of the land. This wall was about two meters long and stretch from north to south on the west side.

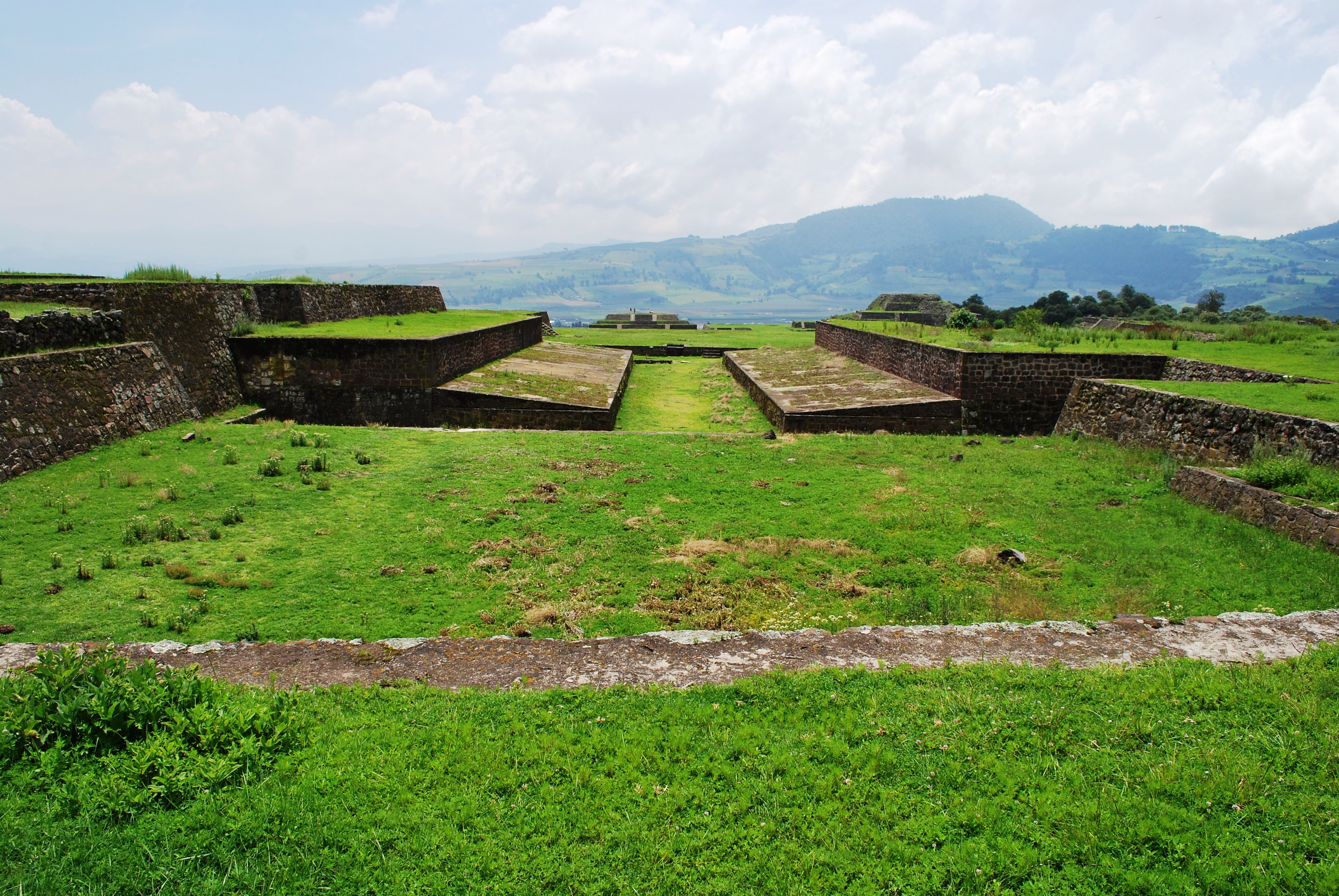
Looking over the ball court to the east

The ball court area (Conjunto E) lies to the south of the Plaza de la Serpiente and Conjunto C. The court is sunken and I-shaped, with the top and bottom of the "I" facing east and west. The actual play space is the body of the "I" which is bordered by walls that first head up vertical from the floor, then steeply incline away from the play area. On the lower, vertical parts of the wall, the stone rings were placed for scoring. Construction denoted as 2E is a grouping of residential structures that are some of the oldest in the city.

The temazcal, or ritual/purification steam bath is located on the east side of the ballgame complex. There is a shallow hole in the center of the area where rocks would be heated then sprinkled with water to produce steam. From the center of the sauna, there is a drainage ditch to take away excess and dirty water. Only the sunken foundation remains. The part above the surface was most likely constructed of adobe, with a kind of a thatched roof. The temazcal was built long before the ball court and was partially destroyed with the court was built.

== Museum ==
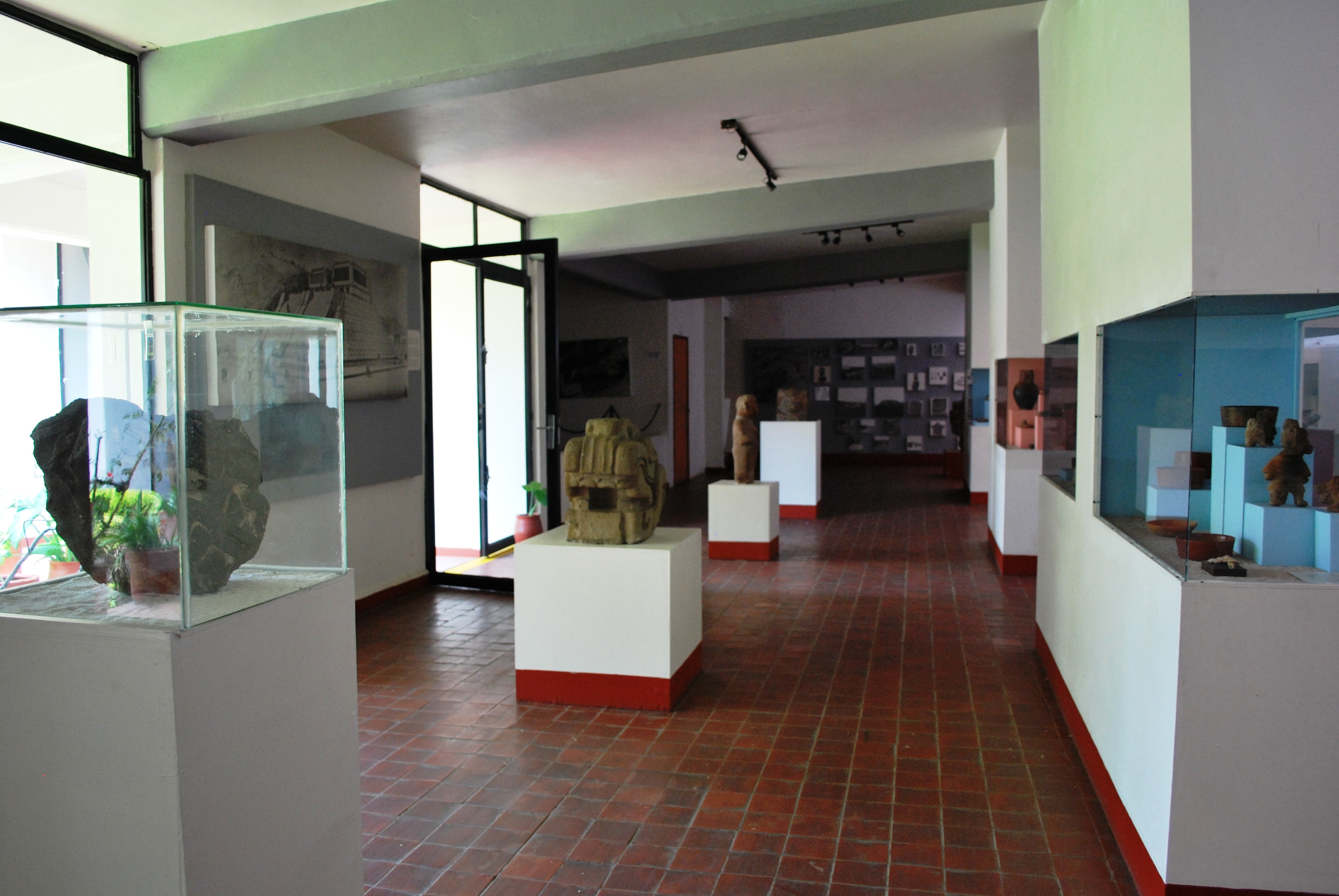
Overview of part of one of the permanent collection rooms

With the excavation of Teotenango, the Roman Piña Chan Archeological Museum was created to put the artifacts found on display. This museum offers a general overview of the cultural development of the highlands of Mexico, from the first human settlements to the highly stratified societies which characterized the post-classic period, with special emphasis on Teotenango. The museum is operated by the Instituto Mexiquense de Cultura (Mexico State Institute of Culture) and is located in Tenango del Valle at the entrance to the archeological site. The museum has three exhibition rooms for its permanent collection, which numbers more than 1,000 pieces. The museum's largest collection is of pieces from the era after the Matlatzinca conquest, including copper utensils, stone tools and sculptures. There are a number of pieces of Aztec origin, including sculptures of Xipe Totec and Chicomecoatl, goddesses of fertility. There are also a few pieces from the era of initial contact with the Spaniards. Lastly, it contains some pieces from other sites, such as stone tools, clay figures and animal-shaped jars from Tlatilco, a small, very early settlement in the Valley of Mexico. The exhibits here show a more complex social organization with more external influences at Teotenango than is evident at Teotihuacan. One of the famous finds during excavation of the site was the "panhuehuetl" or musical drum of Teotenango, made of wood and decorated with a buzzard fighting an eagle, representing the struggle between the Teotenancas-Matlatzincas and the Aztecs for dominance in the area.

== Protection of the site ==
Since formal excavation work was carried out in the 1970s, the site and its museum have been managed by the Instituto Mexiquense de Cultura. There are two reasons for this. First, the excavation and restoration work was done by the Instituto Mexiquense de Cultura and not by federal Instituto Nacional de Antropología e Historia as was customary. Second, a series of constitutional reforms since that time has sought to encourage more direct participation of state and local authorities in the preservation and management of archeological sites and other monuments to Mexico's culture and history. However, as the reforms passed, INAH issued warnings about the Teotenango site's vulnerability to encroachment due to the urban development taking place in Tenango del Valle. Of the 600 hectares set aside by the initial project, only two-thirds is still considered to be adequately protected. Urban development in the Tenango del Valle area has accelerated since the year 2000 and many constructions now border the protected area, which is not fenced. Encroachment generally takes the form of these constructions threatening the stability of site structures above and below the surface as well as the unauthorized taking of objects at the site. Almost all of this is occurring at the site's south and west sides, where almost no formal excavation work has been done and about which little is known.
