= Nevado de Toluca =

Stratovolcano in central Mexico

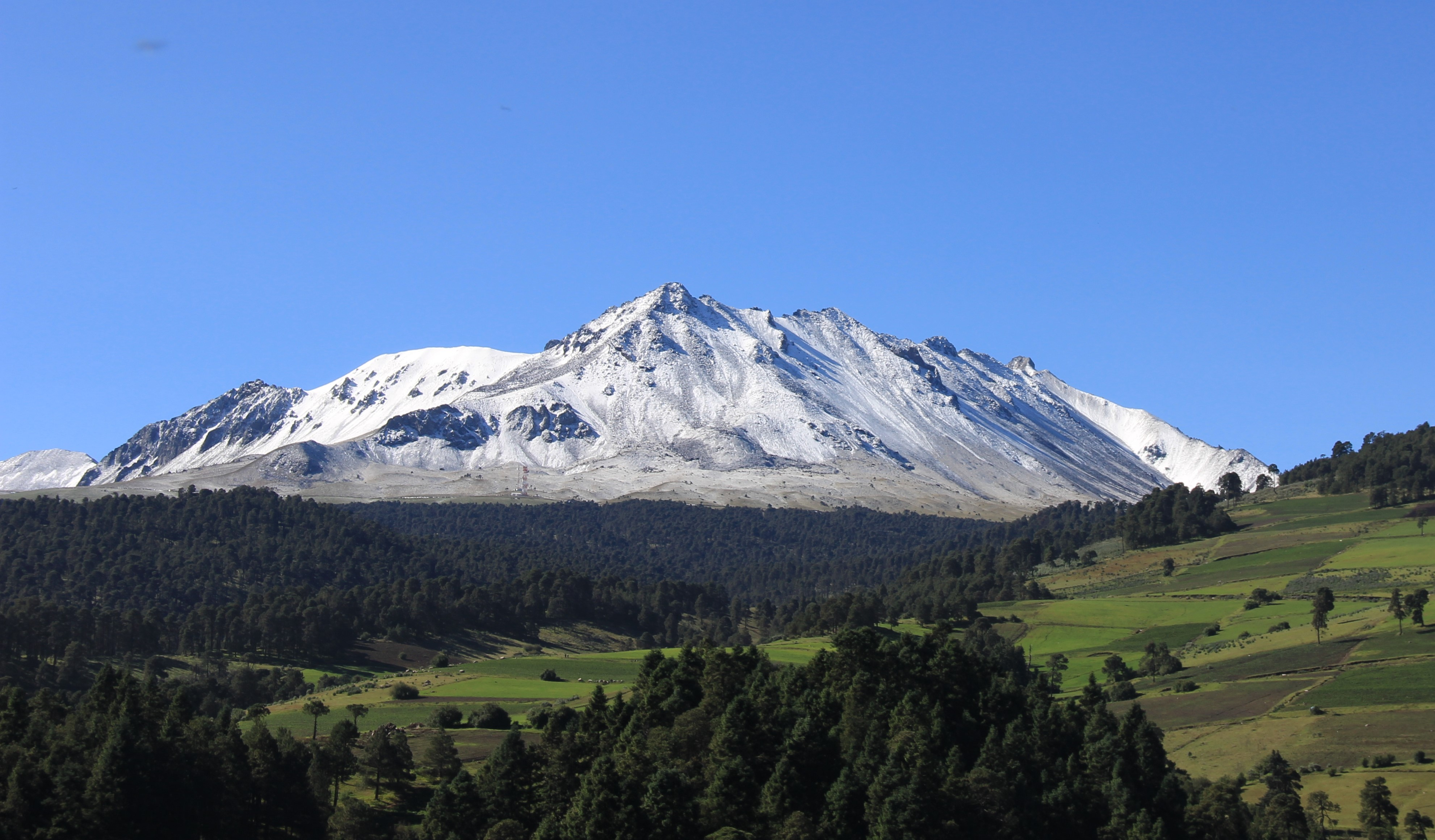
- Nevado de Toluca as seen from Lerma (southeast).

Highest point
- Elevation: 4,680 m (15,350 ft)
- Prominence: 2,210 m (7,250 ft)
- Parent peak: Popocatépetl
- Isolation: 118.39 km (73.56 mi)
- Listing: North America highest peak 17th; North America prominent 61st; Mexico highest major peaks 4th
- Coordinates: 19°06′06″N 99°46′03″W

Geography
- Location within State of Mexico Location within Mexico
- Location: Texcaltitlán, México, Mexico

Geology
- Mountain type: Stratovolcano
- Volcanic belt: Trans-Mexican Volcanic Belt
- Last eruption: 1350 BCE (?)

Climbing
- Easiest route: road, hiking trail

Nevado de Toluca (Spanish: [neˈβaðo ðe toˈluka]) is a stratovolcano in central Mexico, located about 80 kilometres (50 mi) west of Mexico City near the city of Toluca. It is the fourth highest of Mexico's peaks, after Pico de Orizaba, Popocatépetl and Iztaccíhuatl. The volcano and the area around it is now a national park, which was closed indefinitely in August 2025 after an accident.

== Etymology ==
It is often called by the Nahuatl name Xinantecatl which is usually translated as The Naked Lord, Señor Desnudo in Spanish, although other etymologies have been suggested such as "Lord of the Corn Stalks" (Chinantecatl), Tzinacantepetl (Mountain of the Bats), or Tzinacantecatl (person from Zinacantepec). Further evidence regarding the etymologies of this mountain has surfaced after many archeology discoveries in and around the area. It has been concluded that its correct etymology is Chicnauhtecatl meaning "Lord of Nine", probably referring to the various deep lakes at the top of the cone.

== Description ==
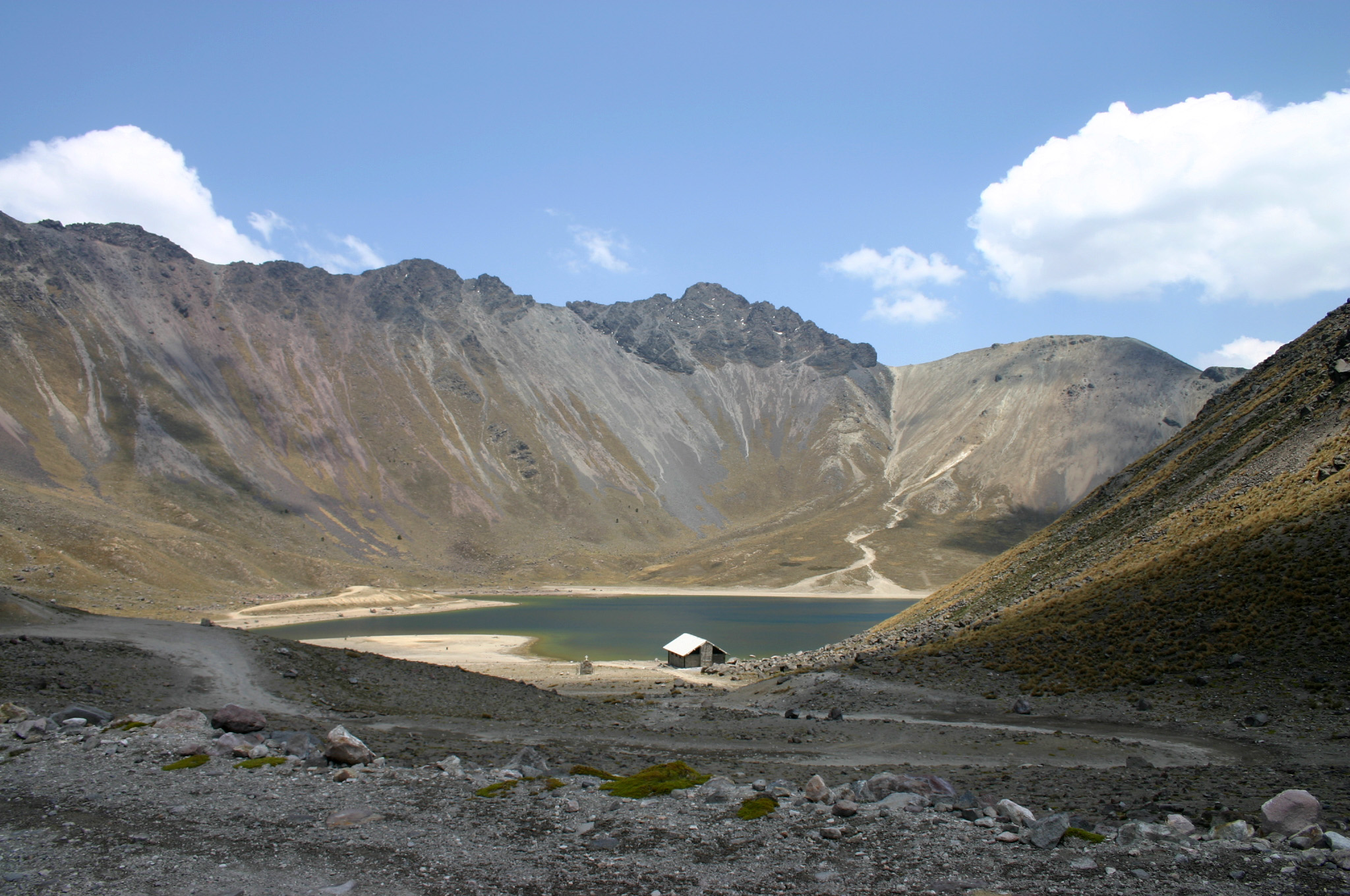
Lago del Sol (Sun Lake)

The volcano has a 1.5-kilometre (0.93 mi) wide summit caldera which is open to the east. The highest summit, the 4,680-metre (15,354 ft) Pico del Fraile (Friar's Peak), is on the southwest side of the crater and the second highest, the 4,640-metre (15,223 ft) Pico del Aguila (Eagle's Peak), is on the northwest.

There are two crater lakes on the floor of the basin at about 4,200 m (13,800 ft), the larger Lago del Sol (Sun Lake) and the smaller, but deeper, Lago de la Luna (Moon Lake).

A road formerly ran into the caldera to the lakes, but is now gated 2 km before the lakes.

From the southeast, Nevado de Toluca looks flat-topped, like shoulders without a head. A Nahuatl legend (recounted as part of the legend of Popocatépetl and Iztaccíhuatl) provides a mythical explanation.

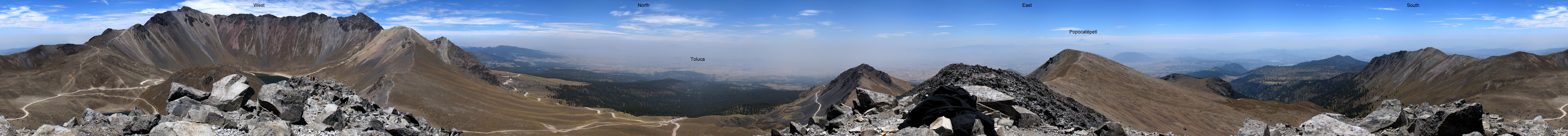
360° panoramic view from crater rim of Nevado Toluca, 120 km to the east the Popocatépetl rises out of the clouds

== Geology ==
It is believed that Nevado de Toluca may once have been as tall as Popocatépetl, until an enormous eruption nearly 25,000 years ago blasted the top of the cone off and reduced its height by as much as 900 m (3,000 ft). The same eruption generated thick lahars, or mudflows, which coated the sides of the mountains. An eruption approximately 500 years later deposited layers of pumice on the mountain's east and northeast slopes.

The last major eruption of Nevado de Toluca occurred about 10,500 years ago (10.5 ka BP), as the volcano erupted a total estimated volume of 20 km^{3} for a VEI strength of 6 (comparable to the 1991 eruption of Mount Pinatubo). The eruption emplaced 1.5 m (5 ft) of pebble-sized pumice in the City of Toluca region and ~50 cm (2 ft) of medium to fine sand in the Mexico City region. Distal lahar deposits derived from the Upper Toluca Pumice event incorporated mammoth bones and other mammals in the basin of Mexico.

The volcano became inactive after a volcanic plug formed in the volcano's vent. The plug eventually became known as El Ombligo ("the Navel").

== Climate ==
Near the summit, Nevado de Toluca has a cold alpine climate (Köppen climate classification ET) with cold temperatures year round. There is little variation in the temperatures and frost and snow can occur in any month. The winter season covers from November to April and precipitation is low, averaging 7.5 millimetres (0.5 in) in March, the driest month. Temperatures during this time are cold, averaging 2.3 °C (36.1 °F) in January. The summer season spans from May to October and precipitation is very high, averaging 235.4 millimetres (9.5 in) in July. Temperatures during this time are warm, averaging 5.3 °C (41.5 °F) in May. The summit is often foggy, averaging 78 days with fog, most of it during the monsoon season. The wettest record month was July 2008 when 513.5 millimetres (20 in) of precipitation fell and the wettest recorded day was July 16, 1999 when 90.5 millimetres (3.5 in) of precipitation fell. The highest temperature ever recorded was 23 °C (73.4 °F) on August 16, 1993, and the lowest temperature recorded was −10 °C (14.0 °F) on February 2, 2004.

Climate data for Nevado de Toluca (4283 m) (1981-2010 normals, extremes 1964-2019)
Month	Jan	Feb	Mar	Apr	May	Jun	Jul	Aug	Sep	Oct	Nov	Dec	Year
Record high °C (°F)	15.0 (59.0)	16.5 (61.7)	19.0 (66.2)	19.0 (66.2)	19.3 (66.7)	19.0 (66.2)	21.0 (69.8)	23.0 (73.4)	16.0 (60.8)	19.0 (66.2)	14.0 (57.2)	13.0 (55.4)	23.0 (73.4)
Mean daily maximum °C (°F)	7.4 (45.3)	8.2 (46.8)	9.8 (49.6)	10.5 (50.9)	10.1 (50.2)	9.6 (49.3)	8.6 (47.5)	8.5 (47.3)	8.2 (46.8)	8.2 (46.8)	7.8 (46.0)	7.5 (45.5)	8.7 (47.7)
Daily mean °C (°F)	2.3 (36.1)	2.9 (37.2)	4.4 (39.9)	5.3 (41.5)	5.3 (41.5)	5.2 (41.4)	4.5 (40.1)	4.5 (40.1)	4.3 (39.7)	3.9 (39.0)	3.0 (37.4)	2.5 (36.5)	4.0 (39.2)
Mean daily minimum °C (°F)	−2.9 (26.8)	−2.3 (27.9)	−1.0 (30.2)	0.0 (32.0)	0.6 (33.1)	0.8 (33.4)	0.5 (32.9)	0.4 (32.7)	0.4 (32.7)	−0.4 (31.3)	−1.7 (28.9)	−2.4 (27.7)	−0.7 (30.8)
Record low °C (°F)	−7.5 (18.5)	−10.0 (14.0)	−8.0 (17.6)	−6.0 (21.2)	−5.0 (23.0)	−4.0 (24.8)	−4.0 (24.8)	−7.0 (19.4)	−5.0 (23.0)	−9.0 (15.8)	−6.5 (20.3)	−8.5 (16.7)	−10.0 (14.0)
Average precipitation mm (inches)	13.6 (0.54)	10.1 (0.40)	7.5 (0.30)	54.6 (2.15)	125.6 (4.94)	205.5 (8.09)	235.4 (9.27)	229.4 (9.03)	209.2 (8.24)	92.1 (3.63)	23.9 (0.94)	9.0 (0.35)	1,215.9 (47.88)
Average rainy days	2.5	2.2	1.7	6.0	13.4	19.7	23.6	22.9	20.7	11.8	3.8	1.9	130.2
Source: Servicio Meteorológico Nacional

== Archeological sites ==
There are 18 registered archeological sites in the park, as this was a ritual center during pre-Hispanic periods. Bernardino de Sahagún wrote about the lakes as a place where the indigenous held ceremonies and sacrifices. The lakes themselves are considered to be two sites, as a large number of offerings, especially copal, were deposited in the lakes. These deposits can be found all over the lakebed as the burning copal was set adrift on the lakes' waters until it sank. Other objects have been found such as ceramics and sculpted stones. Divers used to sack many of the pieces found here but now authorities carefully monitor those who dive.

Most of the other sites are found on the crater's walls and peaks. One of the sites is called Xicotepec which is at the top of a rocky dome known as the Cerro de Ombligo (Spanish for "the navel"). Principally green obsidian blades and multicolored ceramic has been found here. On the north side of the crater is Pico Sahagun, with ceramic pieces, Picos Heilprin North and South in which various types of objects have been found, and El Mirador, which is thought to be related the marking of the zenith of the sun. A stele found here seems to indicate this. The site at the highest altitude is Pico Noreste at 4,130 meters above sea level. It is a small platform with drainage on which has been found highly deteriorated ceramic pieces. On the west side is the Cerro Prieto Cave, which is really a rock shelter which is more than 60 meters high. Not only does it contain evidence of pre-Hispanic visits but also has been a shrine to the Archangel Michael since the colonial period.

There have been intermittent archeological excavations here with the most recent occurring in 2010 sponsored by INAH which found artifacts dating from the Epi-Classic (650-900 AD) and Post-Classic (900-1200 AD) periods and showed that the crater was a meeting place for astronomer priests to predict the growing season.

== Gallery ==
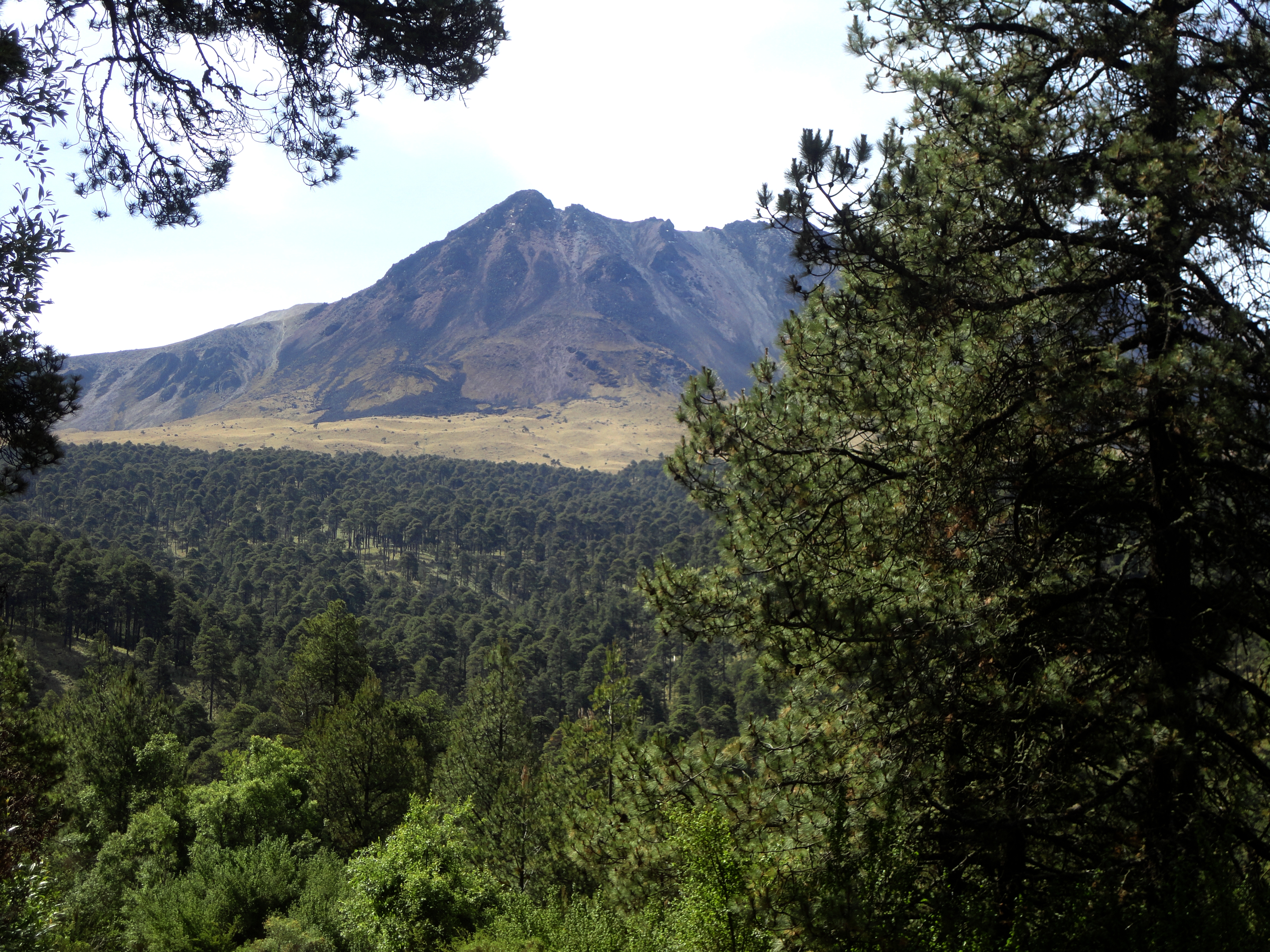

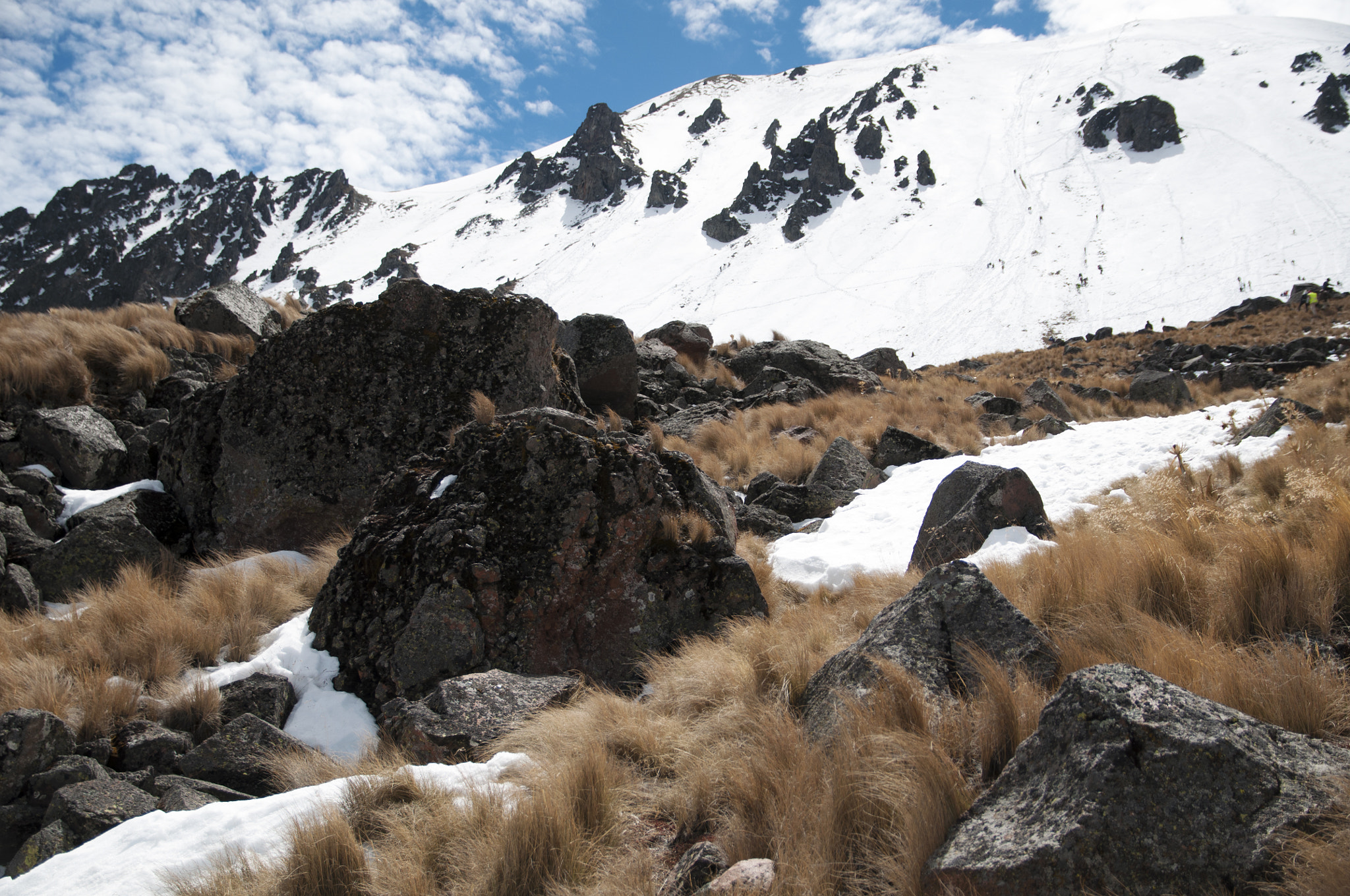

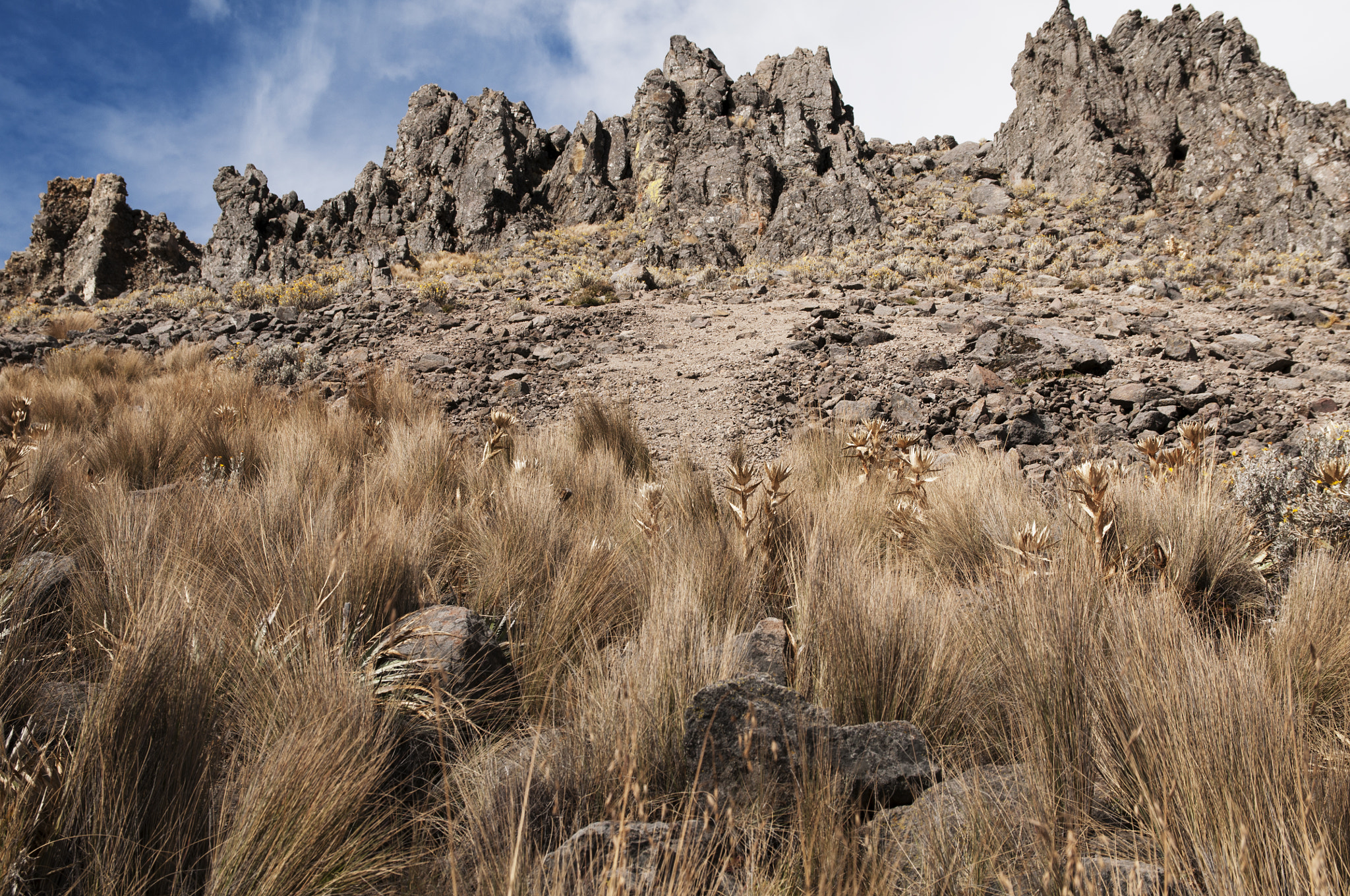

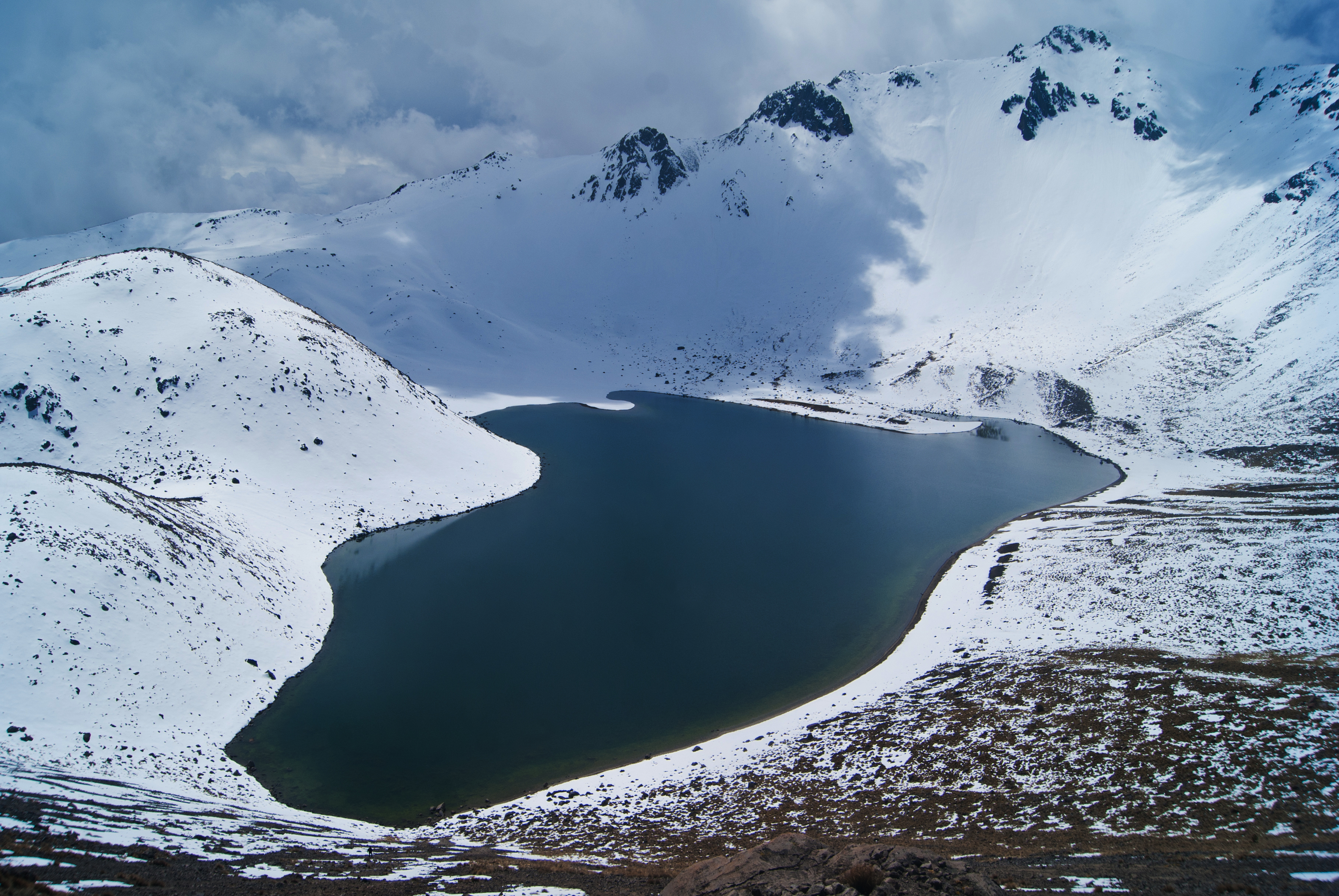

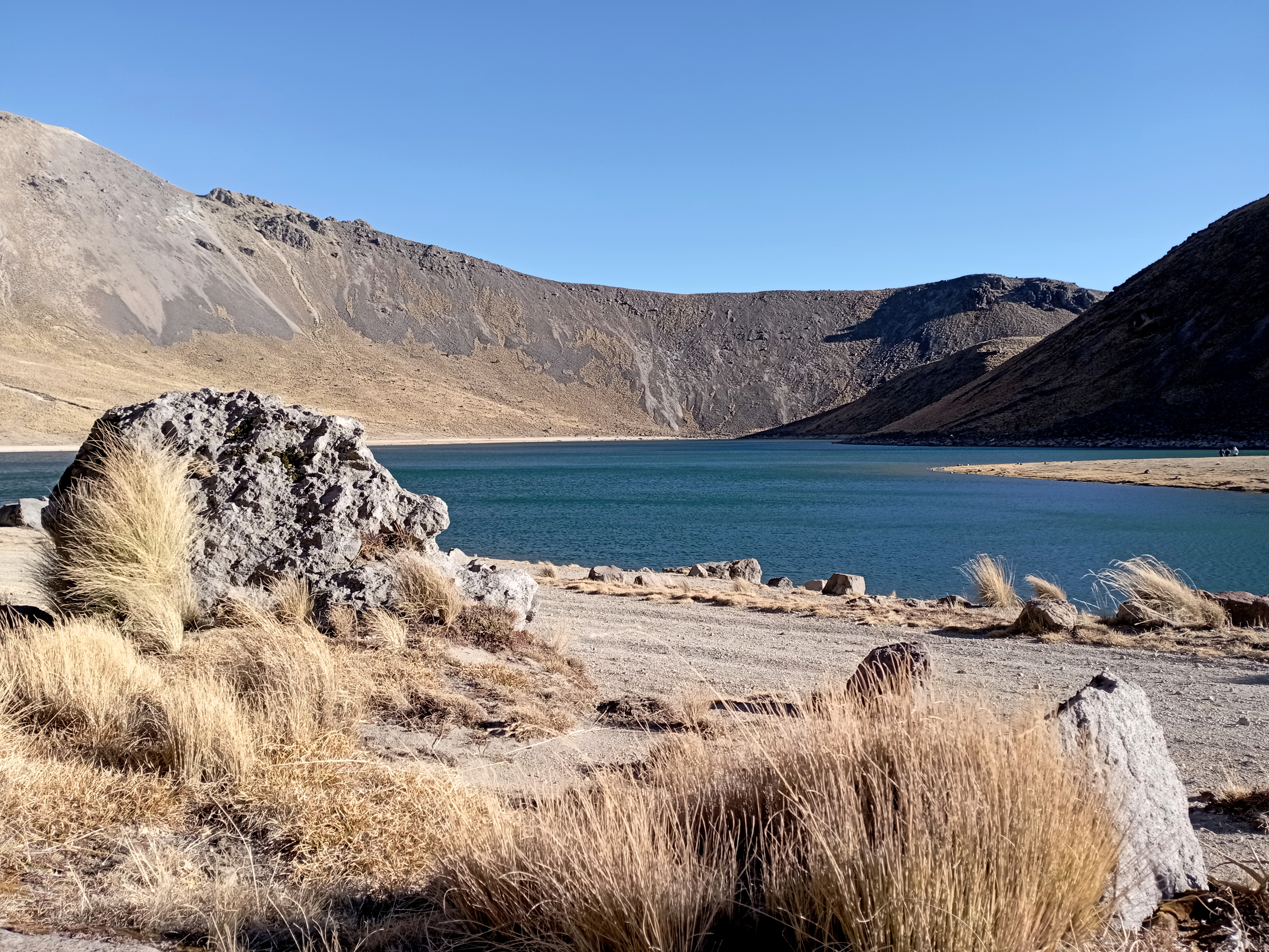

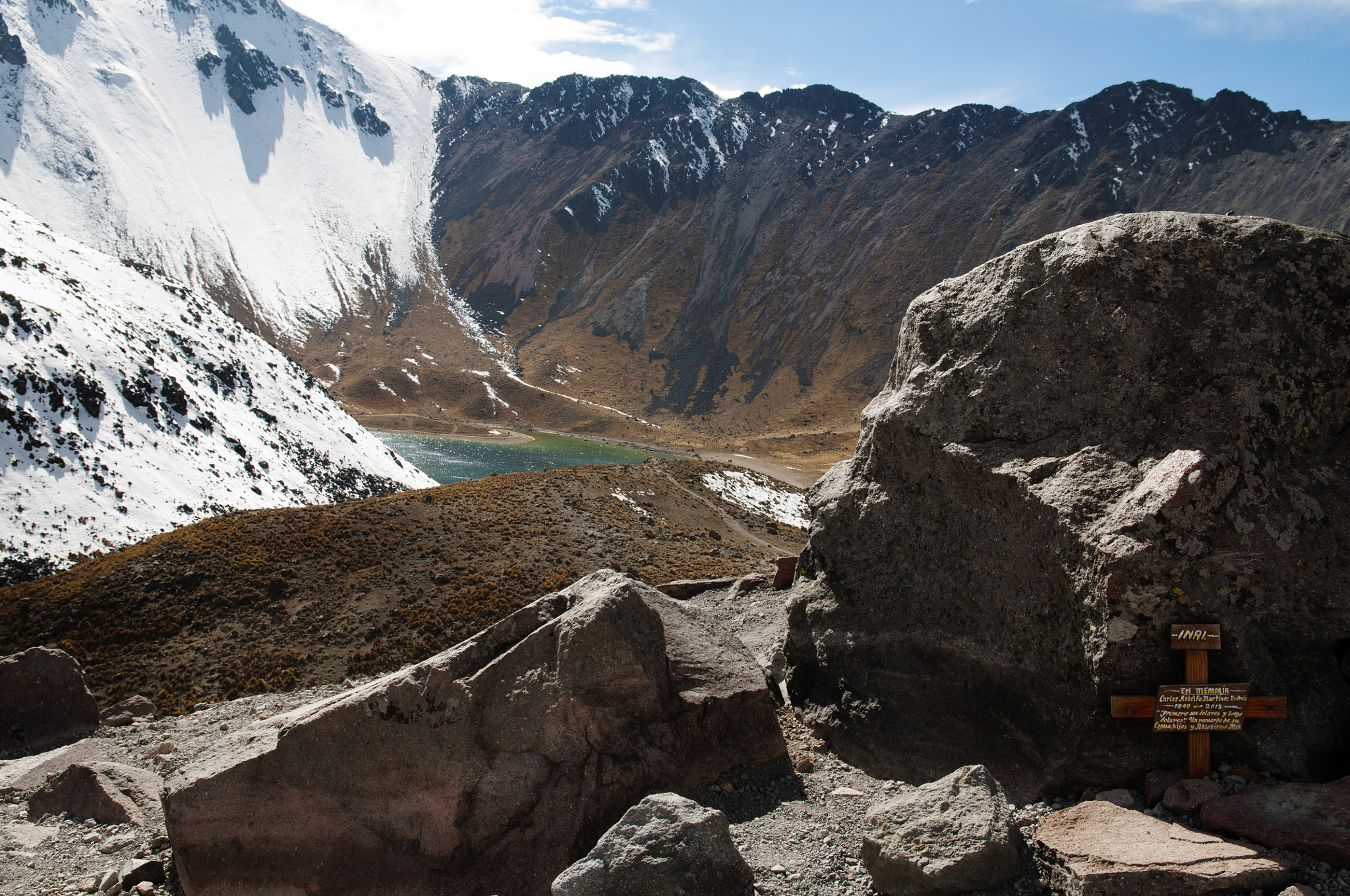

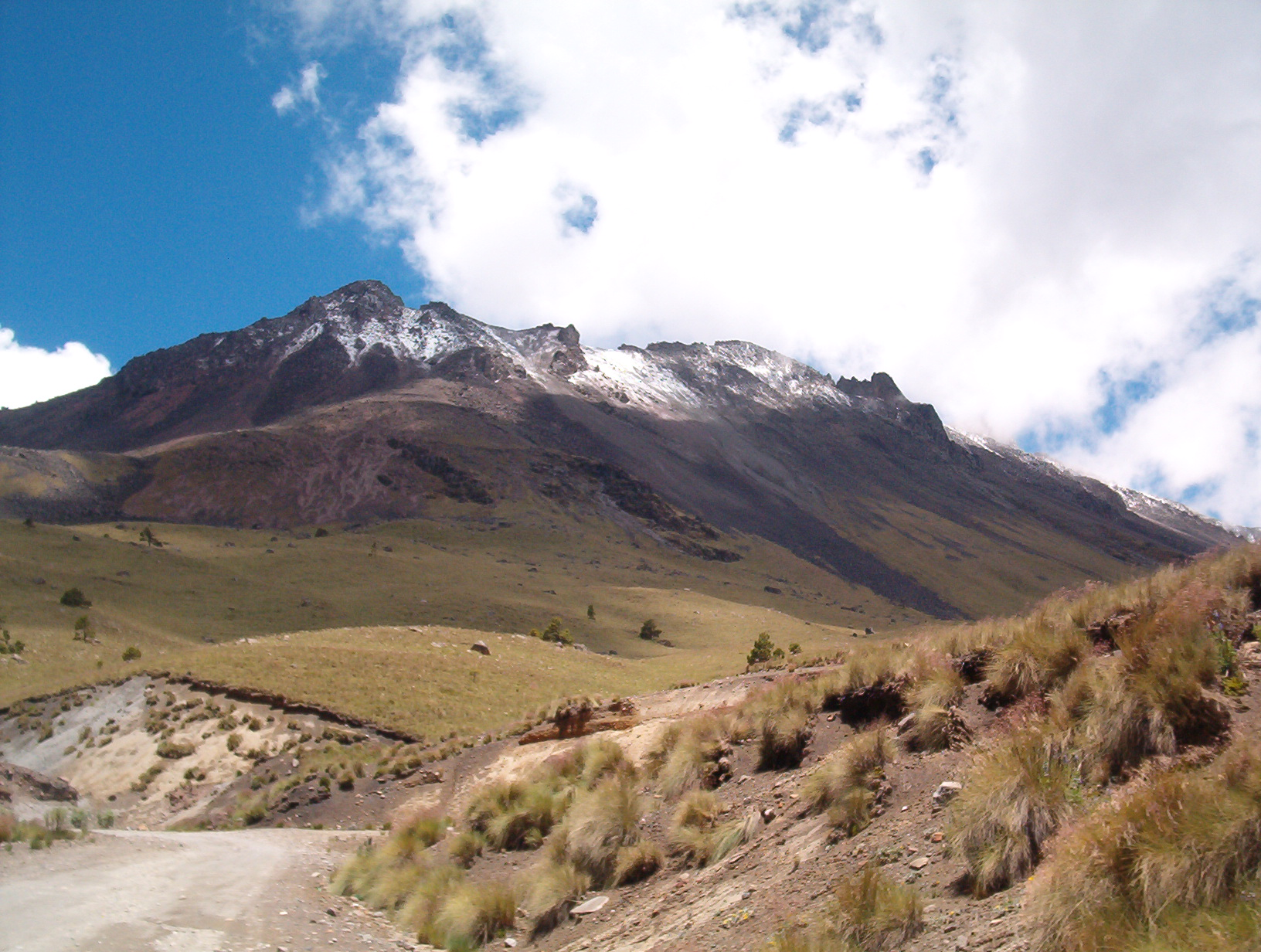

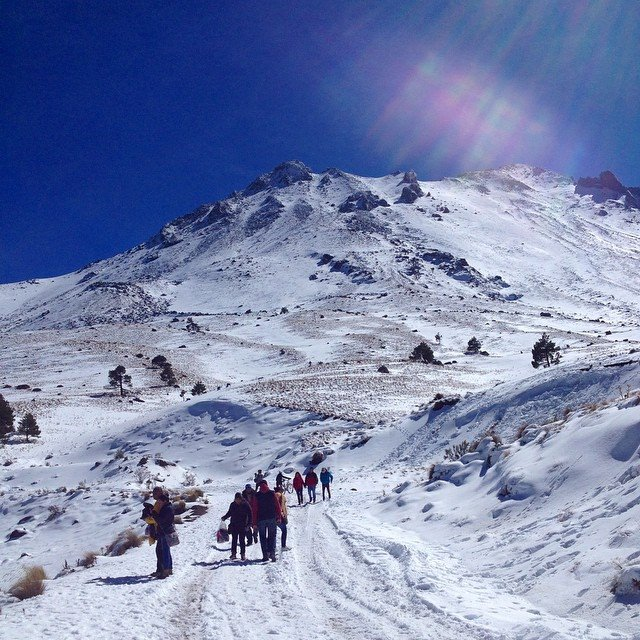

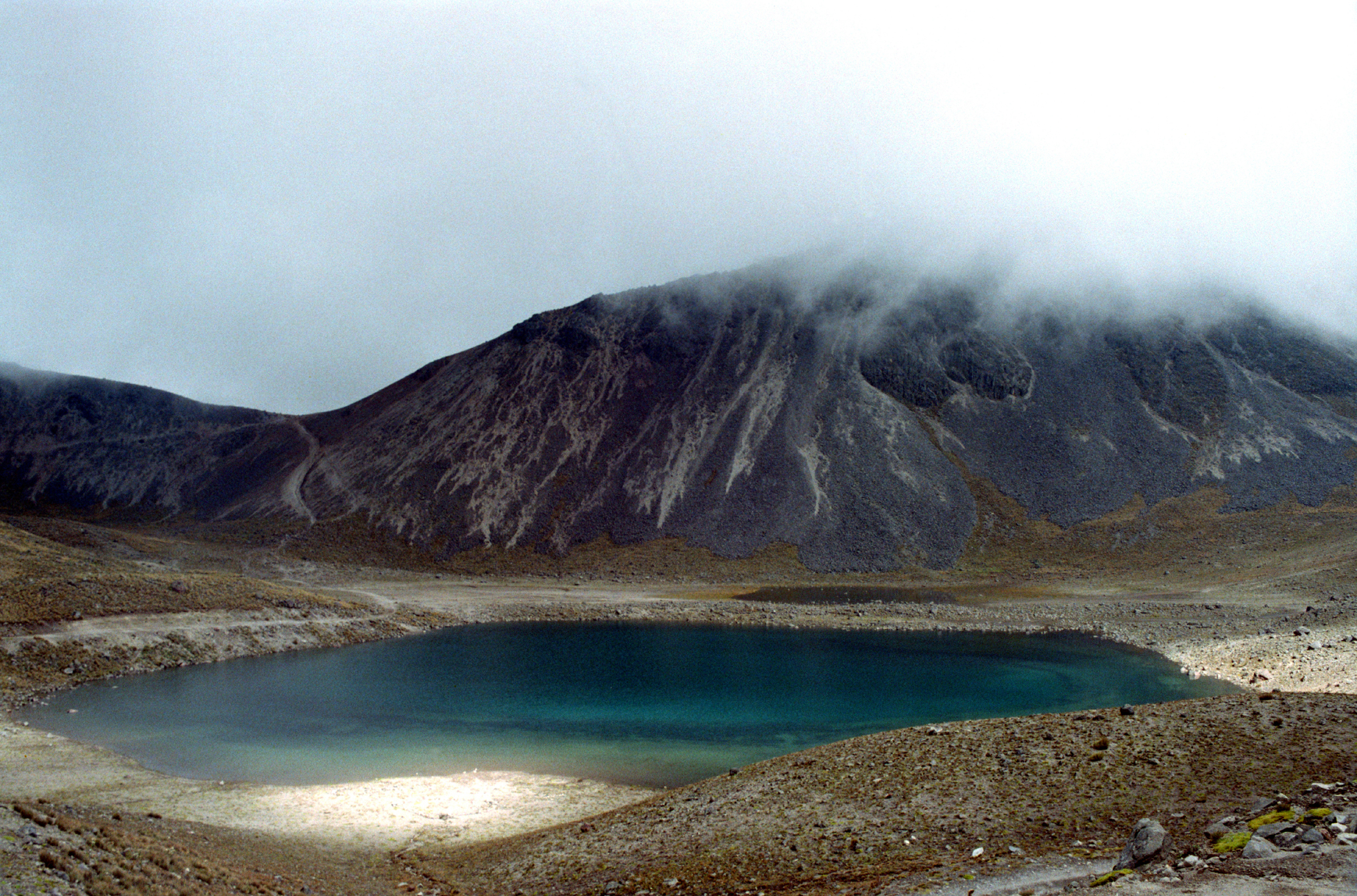

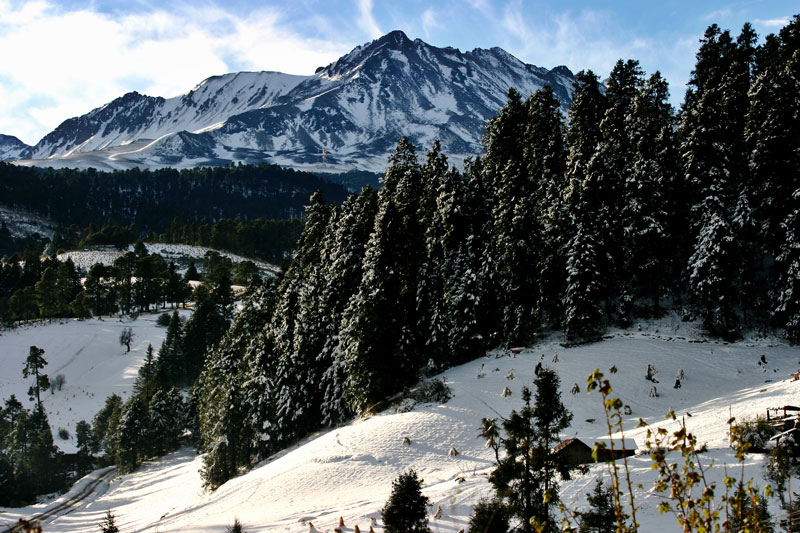

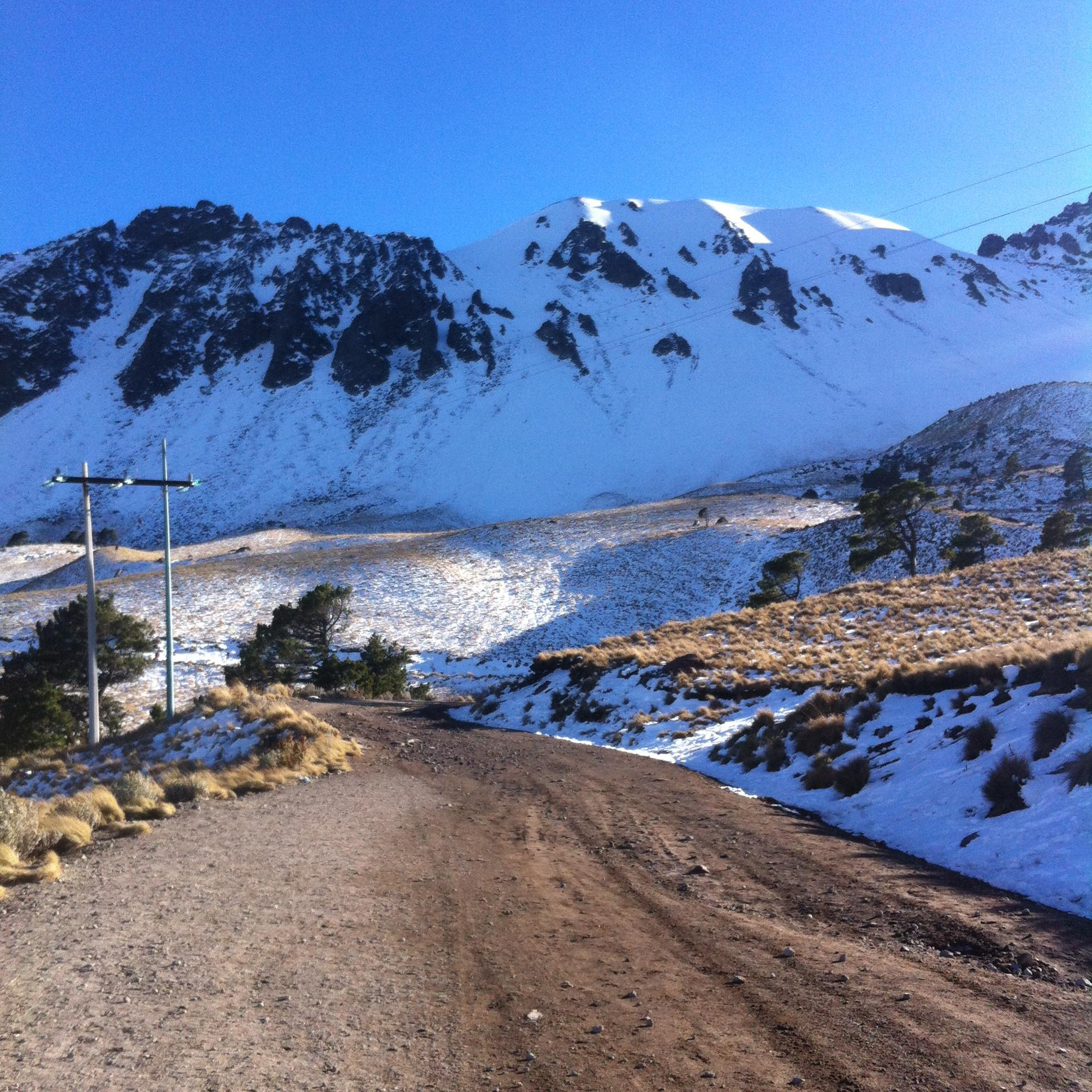

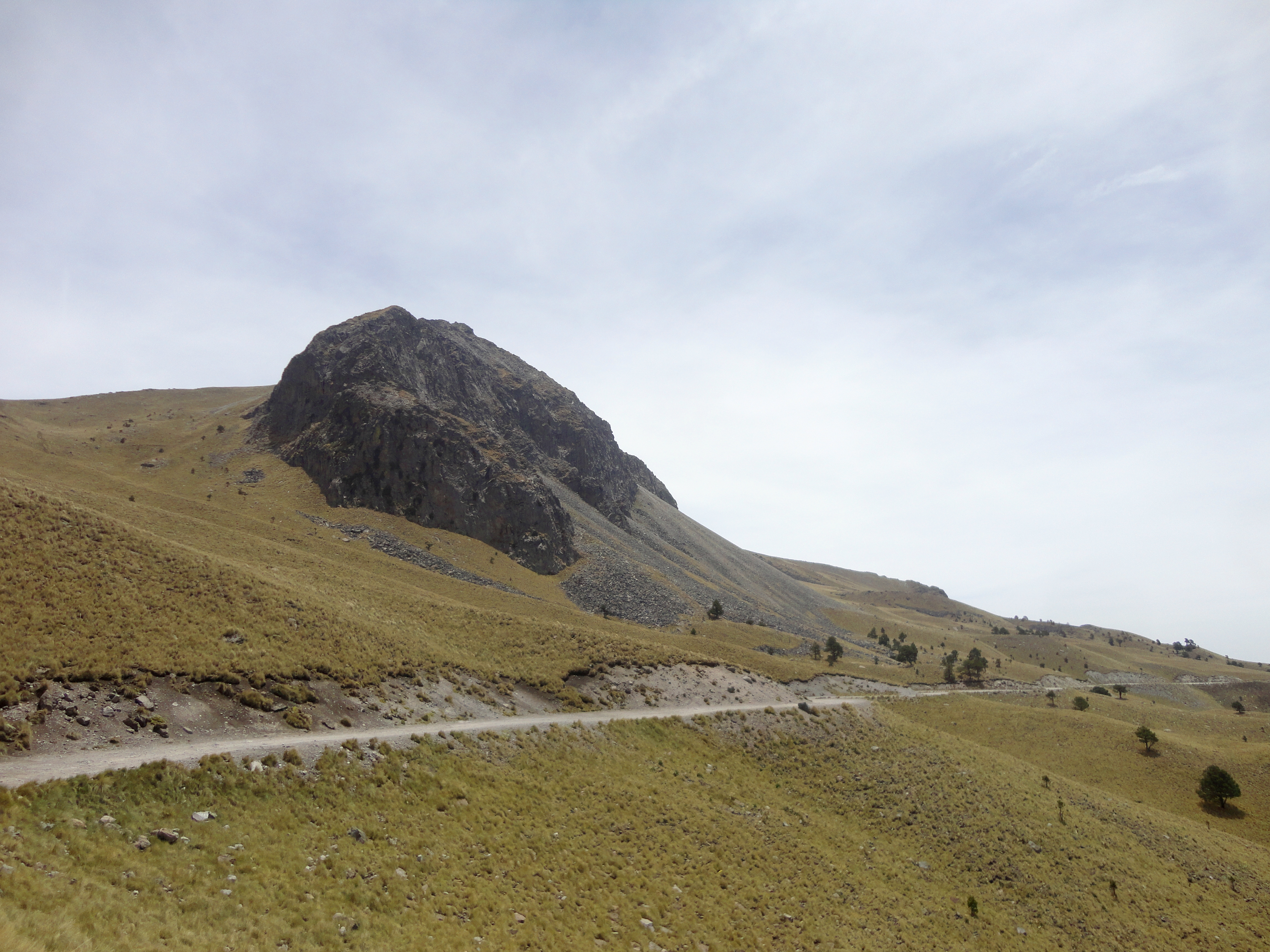

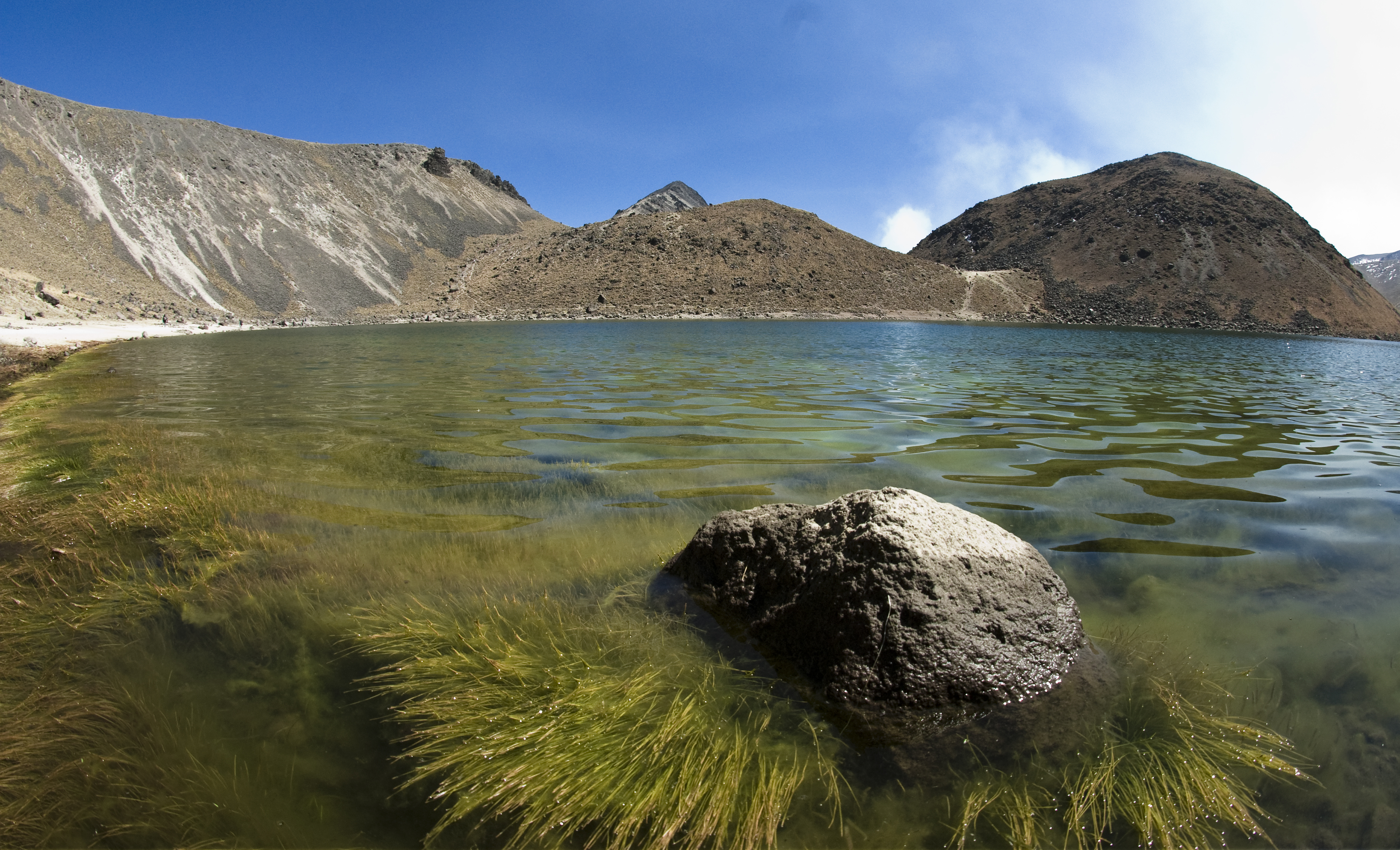

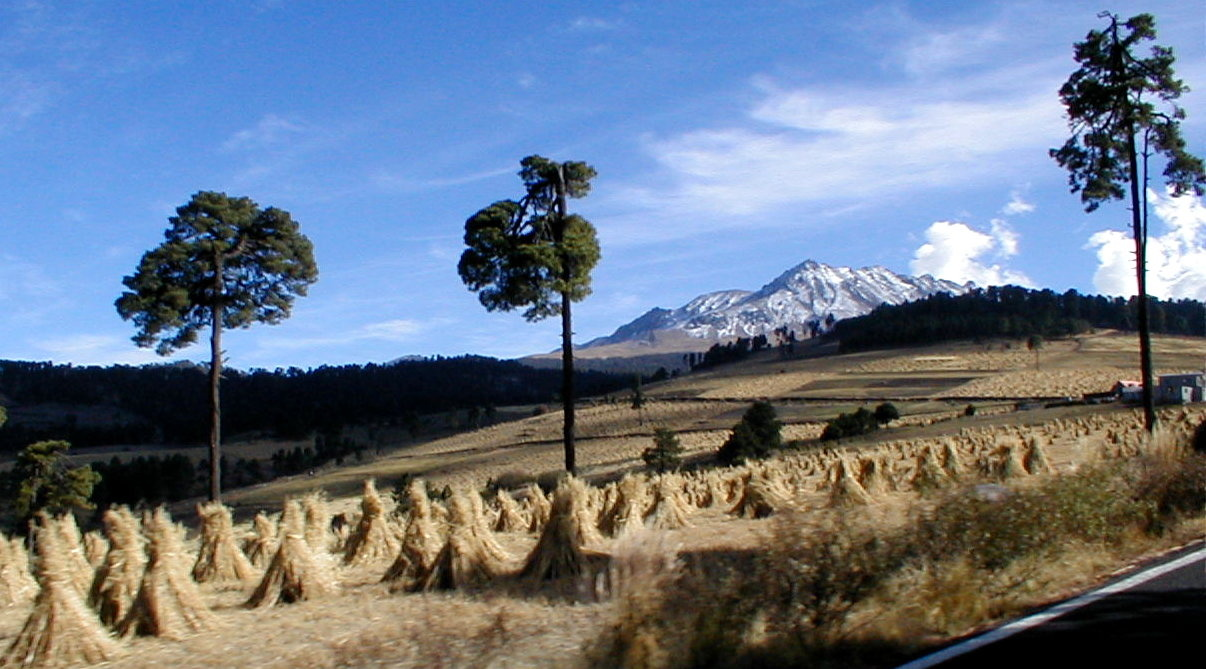

== See also ==
- List of mountain peaks of North America
  - List of mountain peaks of Mexico
    - List of volcanoes in Mexico
    - List of Ultras of Mexico
- Nevado de Toluca National Park
- Arqueologia Mexicana
