= Emilse Miranda Munive =

Mexican politician (born 1971)

- Born: 14 June 1971 (age 55); San Bartolo Tutotepec, Hidalgo, Mexico
- Education: UAEH
- Occupation: Deputy
- Political party: PRI

Emilse Miranda Munive (born 14 June 1971) is a Mexican politician affiliated with the PRI. She served as a federal deputy in the 62nd Congress, representing Hidalgo's fourth district, and previously served as a local deputy in the LXI Legislature of the Congress of Hidalgo. She was the municipal president of San Bartolo Tutotepec from 2003 to 2006.
