= Gerardo Sosa Castelán =

Mexican lawyer and politician (born 1955)

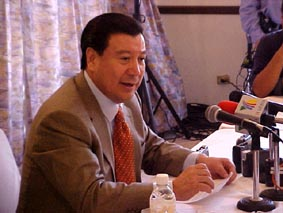
- Born: 26 July 1955 (age 70); Acaxochitlán, Hidalgo, Mexico
- Occupation: Politician
- Political party: PRI

Gerardo Sosa Castelán (Note: In this Mexican name, the surname is Sosa and the second or maternal family name is Castelán.) (born 26 July 1955) is a Mexican lawyer and politician formerly affiliated with the Institutional Revolutionary Party (PRI). He has served as a federal deputy on two occasions: during the 58th Congress (2000–2003) for Hidalgo's fourth district, and during the 60th Congress (2006–2009) as a plurinominal deputy for the fifth electoral region. He previously served in the Congress of Hidalgo from 1981 to 1984 and, from 1991 to 1998, he was the rector of the Autonomous University of the State of Hidalgo (UAEH).

He resigned his membership in the PRI in 2018. On 31 August 2020 he was arrested in Mexico City on a warrant for embezzlement and money laundering.
