= Óscar Bitar Haddad =

Mexican politician

- Born: 16 July 1942 (age 83); Tulancingo, Hidalgo, Mexico
- Occupation: Politician
- Political party: PRI

Óscar Bitar Haddad (born 16 July 1942) is a Mexican politician affiliated with the Institutional Revolutionary Party (PRI). In 2003–2006 he served as a federal deputy in the 59th Congress, representing Hidalgo's fourth district, and he had previously served as municipal president of Tulancingo from 1994 to 1997.
