= Santiago Tulantepec =

Santiago Tulantepec, Hidalgo
- Town
- Location within Hidalgo Location within Mexico
- Coordinates: 20°2′23″N 98°21′27″W
- Country: Mexico
- State: Hidalgo
- Municipality: Tulantepec de Lugo Guerrero

Government
  - Federal electoral district: Hidalgo's 4th
- Elevation: 2,174 m (7,133 ft)

Population (2010 Census)
  - Total: 16,078
- Time zone: UTC-6 (Zona Centro)

Santiago Tulantepec is a town in Mexico that is the municipal seat of Tulantepec de Lugo Guerrero, in the state of Hidalgo.
