= Acatlán, Hidalgo =

Acatlán
- Town & Municipality
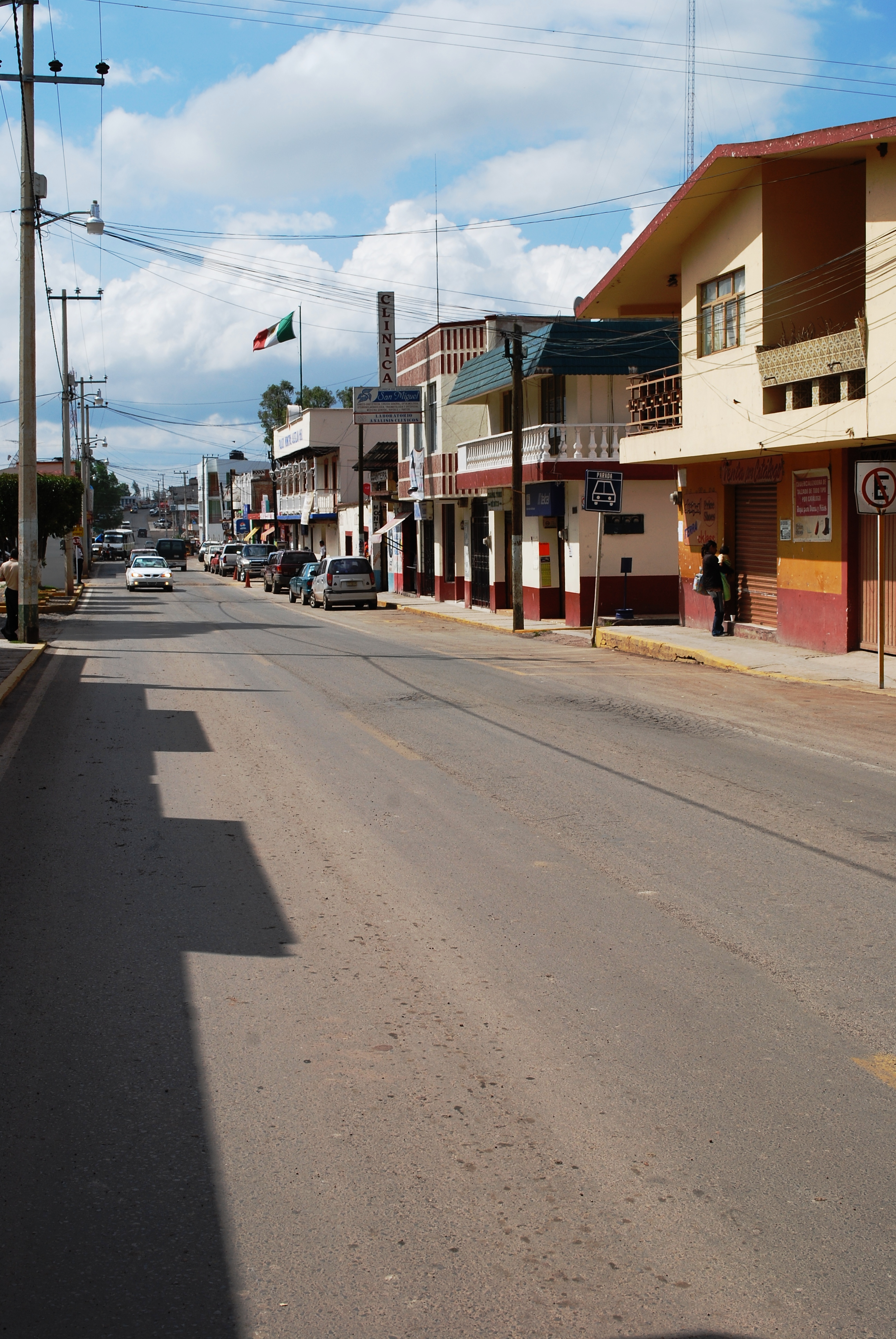
- Main street through town

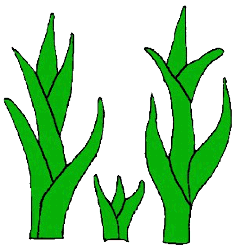
- Coat of arms
- Interactive map of Acatlán
- Coordinates: 20°08′40″N 98°26′18″W
- Country: Mexico
- State: Hidalgo
- Founded: 1518
- Municipal status: 1869

Government
  - Municipal president: Benito Olvera Muñoz (2020–2024)
  - Federal electoral district: Hidalgo's 4th
- Elevation (of seat): 2,140 m (7,020 ft)

Population (2020) Municipality
  - Municipality: 22,268
  - Seat: 418
- Time zone: UTC-6 (Zona Centro)
- Postal code (of seat): 43540
- Website: http://www.acatlanhidalgo.gob.mx/

Acatlán is a town and municipality located in the Mexican state of Hidalgo, about 10 km northwest of the city of Tulancingo and 147 km from Mexico City. The main landmark is the San Miguel monastery which was built in the 16th century. It is partially in ruins but there have been efforts since the 1980s to restore it. Acatlán comes from a Nahuatl phrase which means “near the reeds”.

== History ==
Before the arrival of the Spanish, this area was part of an Aztec tributary province. After the Conquest, it became part of the encomienda controlled b D. Pedro de Paz, which encompassed the area of what is now the municipalities of Atotonilco, Huasca de Ocampo and Acatlán. Later in the colonial period, it became part of an "Indian Republic", meaning the Otomi and Mexicas here had some amount of autonomy from Spanish rule.

The town's founding is dated as 1518, but the first records in which the town appears date to 1564 when governor Domingo de Alvardo has a color map drawn. The monastery was built by the Augustinians between 1544 and 1569 and dedicated to the Archangel Michael. The town would take on "San Miguel" as a prefix late into the 18th century. It is not known who exactly built it as the earliest surviving record is a registry of marriages from 1569. Other records from this time indicate that it was in operation with three monks in residence, including one who could speak both Nahuatl and Otomi. The monastery was turned over to regular clergy in 1745, becoming the parish of the community under Father Miguel Echeverría. Originally it was under the jurisdiction of Mexico City but became part of the Tulancingo archdiocese in 1864.

At the end of the 16th century, the encomiendas were broken up into the hacienda system, with the Totopa, Mixquiapan, Zupitlán, Tpenacasco and Cacaloapan located in what is now the municipality. In the middle of the 18th century, natives of the area struggled against María Dolores Romero de Terreros over lands that were annexed to the San Juan Hueyapan Hacienda in Huasca. These and other problems with the landed elite caused most of the populace here to side with the insurgents during the Mexican War of Independence in the early 19th century, recruiting a number of soldiers hereafter Nicolás Bravo occupied nearly Tulancingo.

The municipality was created in 1869. The town was temporarily occupied by forces loyal to Venustiano Carranza during the Mexican Revolution, using the monastery as a barracks. The church and monastery complex area is undergoing restoration work, which was begun by the Instituto Nacional de Antropología e Historia in 1988.

== The town ==
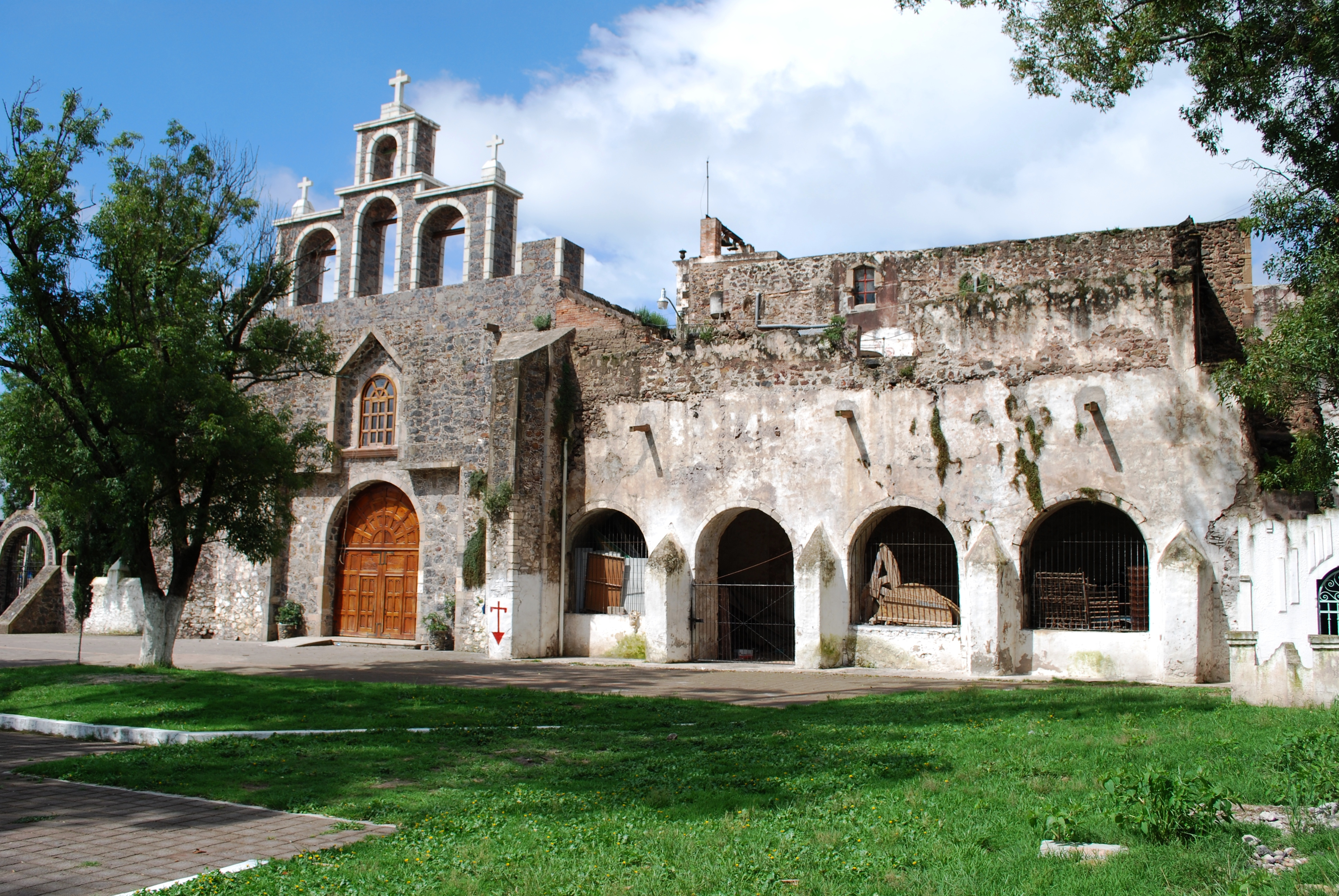
View of the church and former monastery

The town itself straddles the Huasca-Tulancingo road and serves as a commerce center for the surrounding rural Tulancingo Valley. The town center has municipality's main public buildings, including the area's only library, the Biblioteca Pública Municipal Profra. Matilde Sánchez Soto. The main structure is the San Miguel Monastery, which was one of the largest built by the Augustinians in the 16th century in Hidalgo. The complex is partially in ruins although there have been efforts starting from the 1980s to restore it. The facade has flat belfry with four slots for bells. Both the facade and the cloister are nearly devoid of decoration, with traces of the original painted decoration in the cloister and open chapel. It conserves three of its four “capillas posas” or chapels on each of the corners of the large atrium. In the middle of this atrium is a large stone cross. The town hosts the Expo-Acatlán at the end of September, which features dairy products and crafts as well as rides, cultural events and other attractions.

The feast in honor of the Archangel Michael is held from 20–29 September, with religious events, traditional dances and other activities. At these and other events, are traditional foods such as cueritos (pig skin in chili pepper sauce) and varieties of pulque.

== The municipality ==
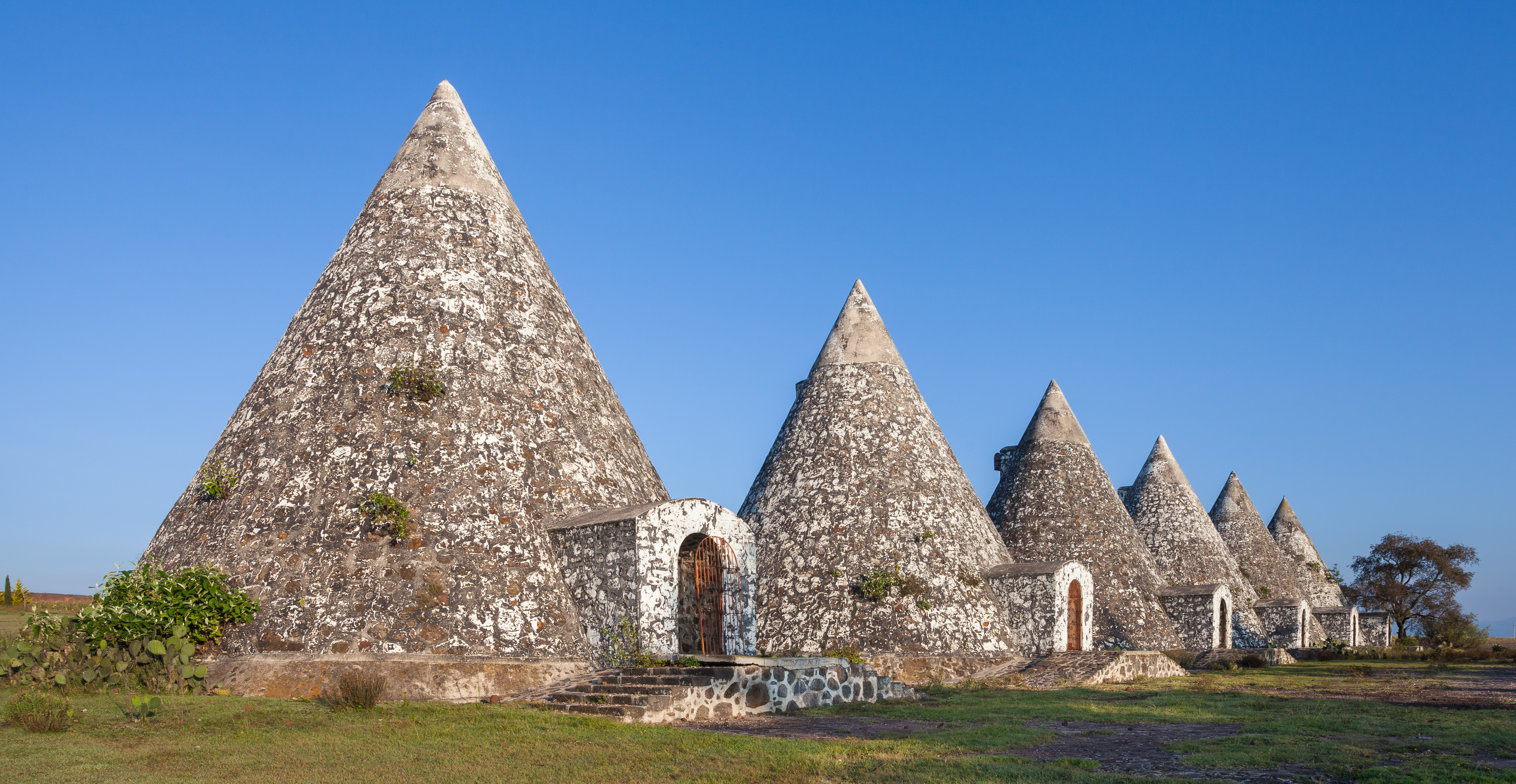
Silos in San Dionisio, Acatlán

As the municipal seat, the town of Acatlán is the governing authority for about sixty five other communities (INEGI) which cover an area of 174.70 km2. However, as of 2005, only 418 out of the total municipal population of 17914 lives in the town proper (INEGI). The municipality borders the municipalities of Huasca de Ocampo, Agua Blanca de Iturbide, Metepec, Tulancingo de Bravo and Singuilucan. The town and municipality are located in the Tulancingo Valley. Notable elevations include the Cerro la Providencia and Cerro Prieto. Other elevations are located near the municipality's borders with Huasca and Tulancingo. It is located in the Moctezuma River basin with rivers and streams such as the Grande Tulancingo, Los Enlamaderos, Las Vegas, El Meco and Salto de Alcholoya. Depending on elevation, the climate ranges from temperate and semi-arid (70% of the territory) to temperate and semi-humid, with rains mostly in the summer and early autumn. Average annual temperature is 14 °C. Most of the vegetation is adapted to dry conditions and includes grasses, cactus, palm trees and mesquites. In higher elevations, some broadleaf trees can be found. Wildlife mostly consists of small mammals such as squirrels, opossums, foxes and others. Bird species include eagles, owls and buzzards and reptiles include rattlesnakes and chameleons.

The major natural attraction of the area is the Alcholoya Canyon which contains a waterfall. Other landmarks in the area include Supitlán Lake, the San Pablo thermal springs, which are reputed to have healing capabilities, Cerro del Yolo Mountain, the Santa Elena Dam the former haciendas of Totoapa and Tepaenacascasco, now known as the Rancho Alicia. The Hacienda El Lucero is known for its restaurant which serves exotic dishes such as crocodile ceviche, Sinaloa style, filets of wild boar and ostrich and dishes made with deer, buffalo and other meats.

== Economy ==
The municipality is poor with agriculture, both commercial and sustenance, being the basis of the economy. Between half to two-thirds of the population farms, either full or part-time, with just over half earning minimum wage and 28% receiving no monetary income at all. While much of the agriculture is mechanized, due to the relative flatness of the land, animal pulled plows can still be found here. Main crops include corn, beans, barley and maguey for pulque. Two-thirds of the municipality's land is cultivated, with the most valuable crops being hay and barley grain. About two-thirds of agriculture is dependent on the rainy season with the rest on irrigation. Much of the rest of the territory is used as pasture, especially for goats. Other domesticated animals include turkeys, chickens, sheep, cows, pigs and horses.

The industry is mostly limited to wood products, dairy products and the mining of kaolinite and some other industrial minerals. There is an asbestos production facility in Alcholoya. Commerce is limited to serving local needs.

== Education ==
The municipality has kindergartens and primary schools, with middle school education available through telesecundarias, sites where lessons are delivered via media from other places. Less than 17% of the population finishes middle school. Those seeking further education must go to Tulancingo or Pachuca. The illiteracy rate is 26.5% although this number is slowly diminishing. The major issue for education is that there are too few schools and many people do not have the resources to travel to school. There are almost no speakers of indigenous languages, but there is a primary school targeted at the indigenous.
