= List of non-building structure types =

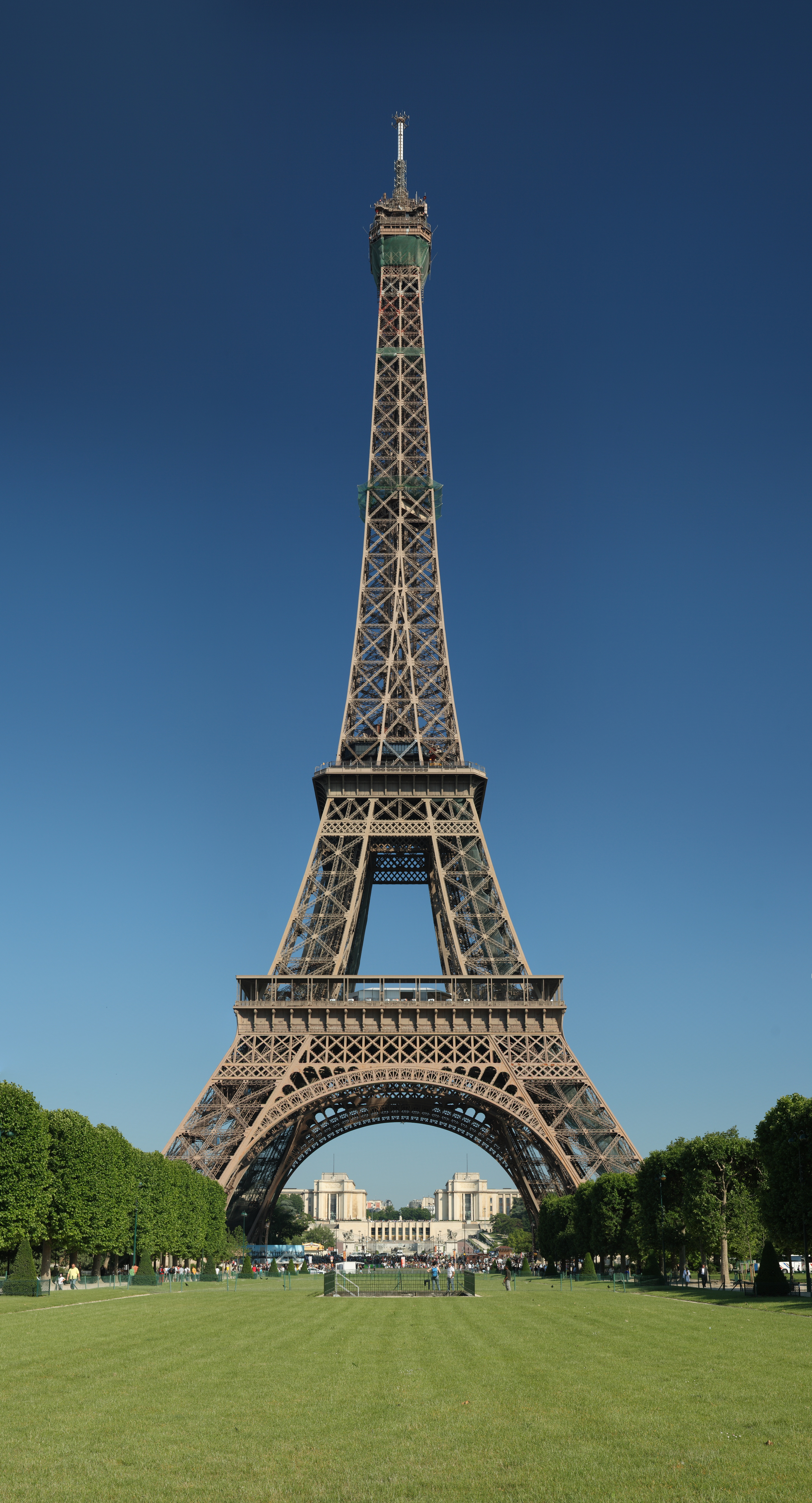
Eiffel Tower

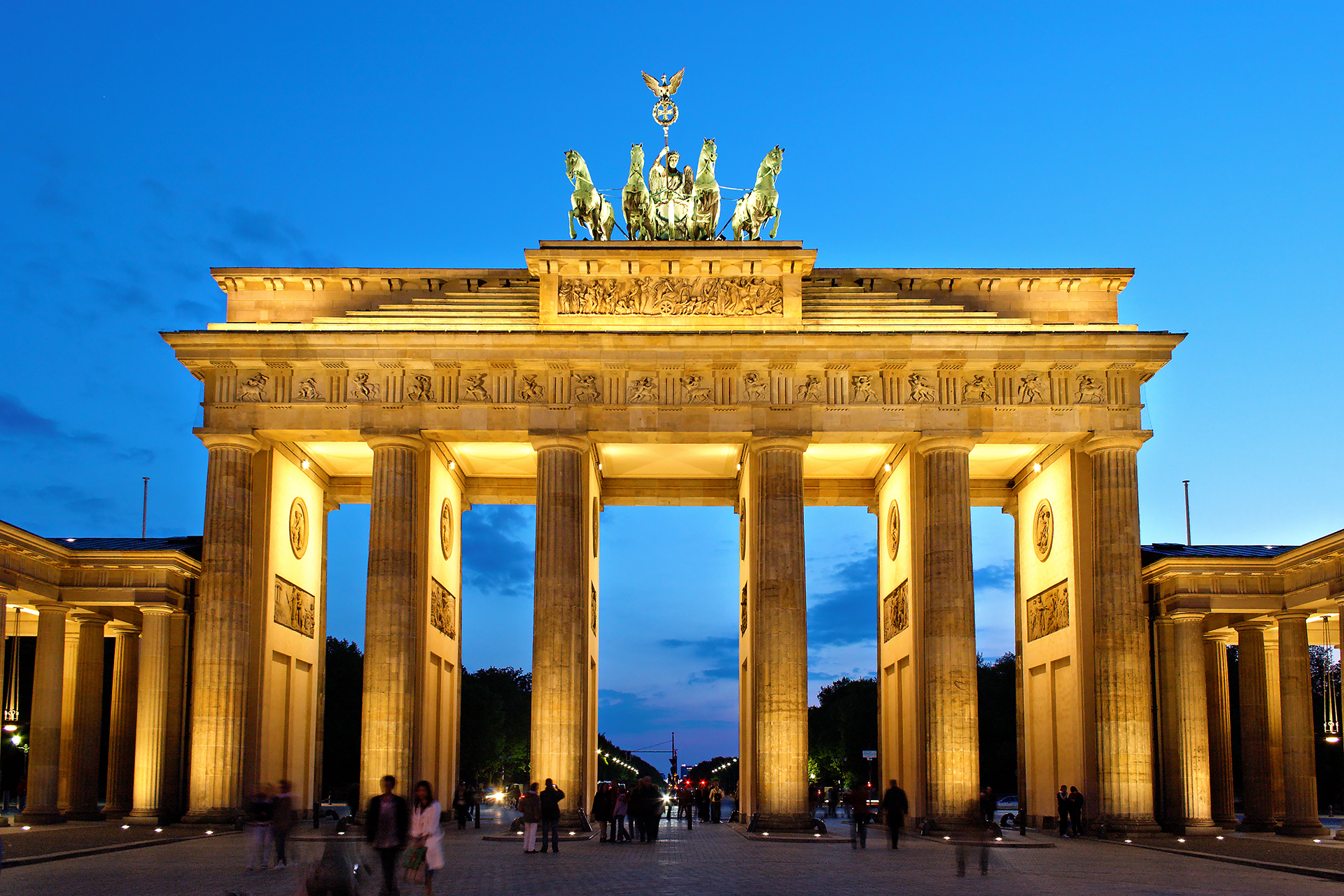
Brandenburg Gate

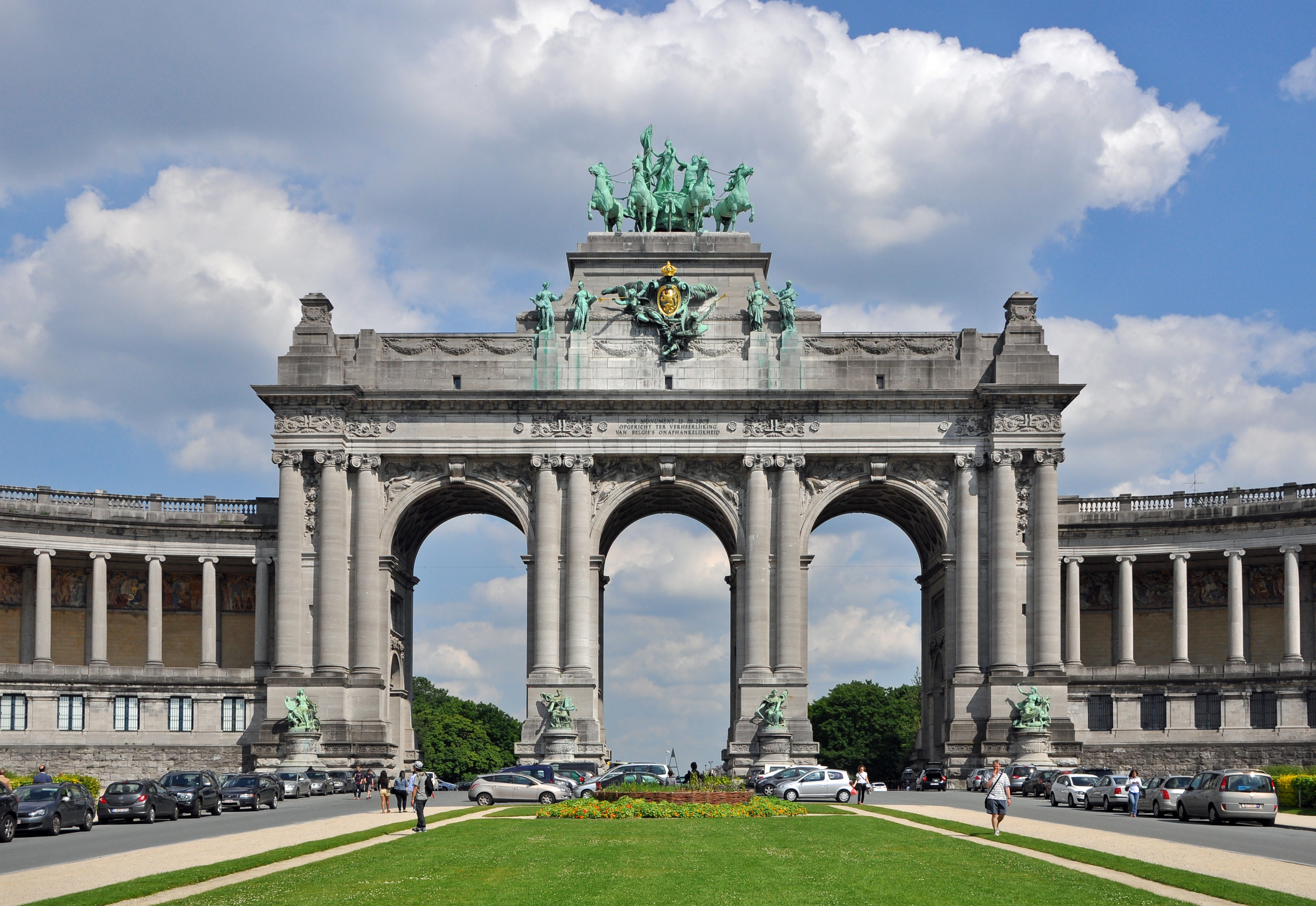
The Arcade du Cinquantenaire in Brussels, Belgium

Golden Gate Bridge

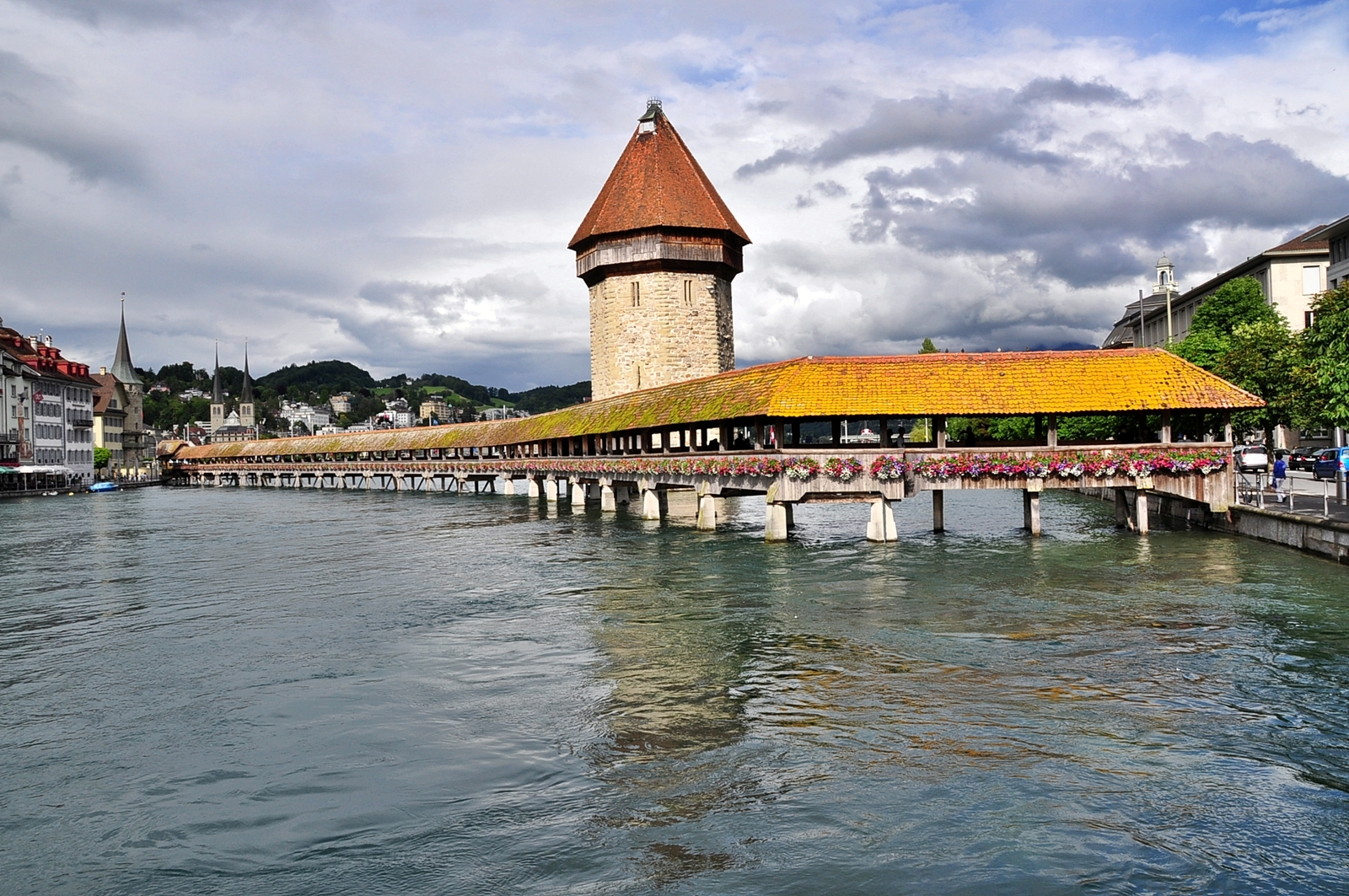
Kapellbrücke (Chapel Bridge), a covered bridge in Lucerne, Switzerland

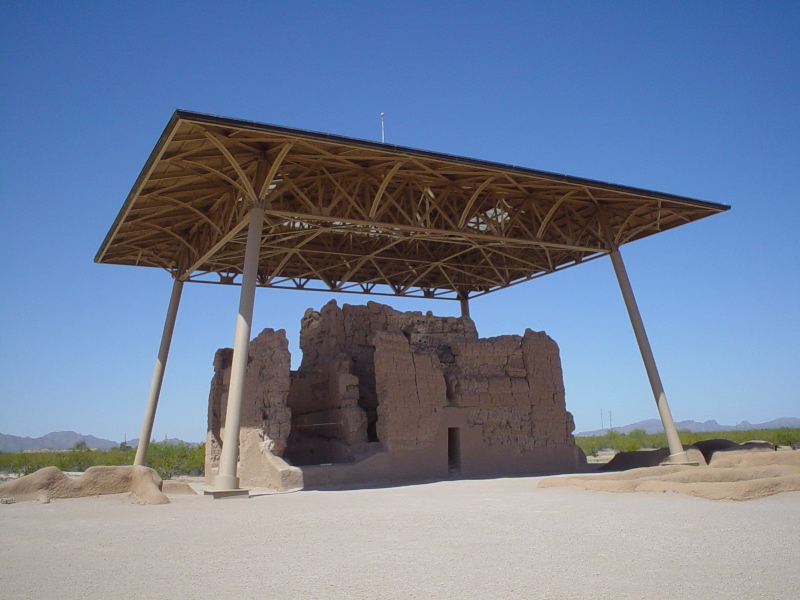
The Olmsted ramada over the Big House of Casa Grande National Monument in Arizona

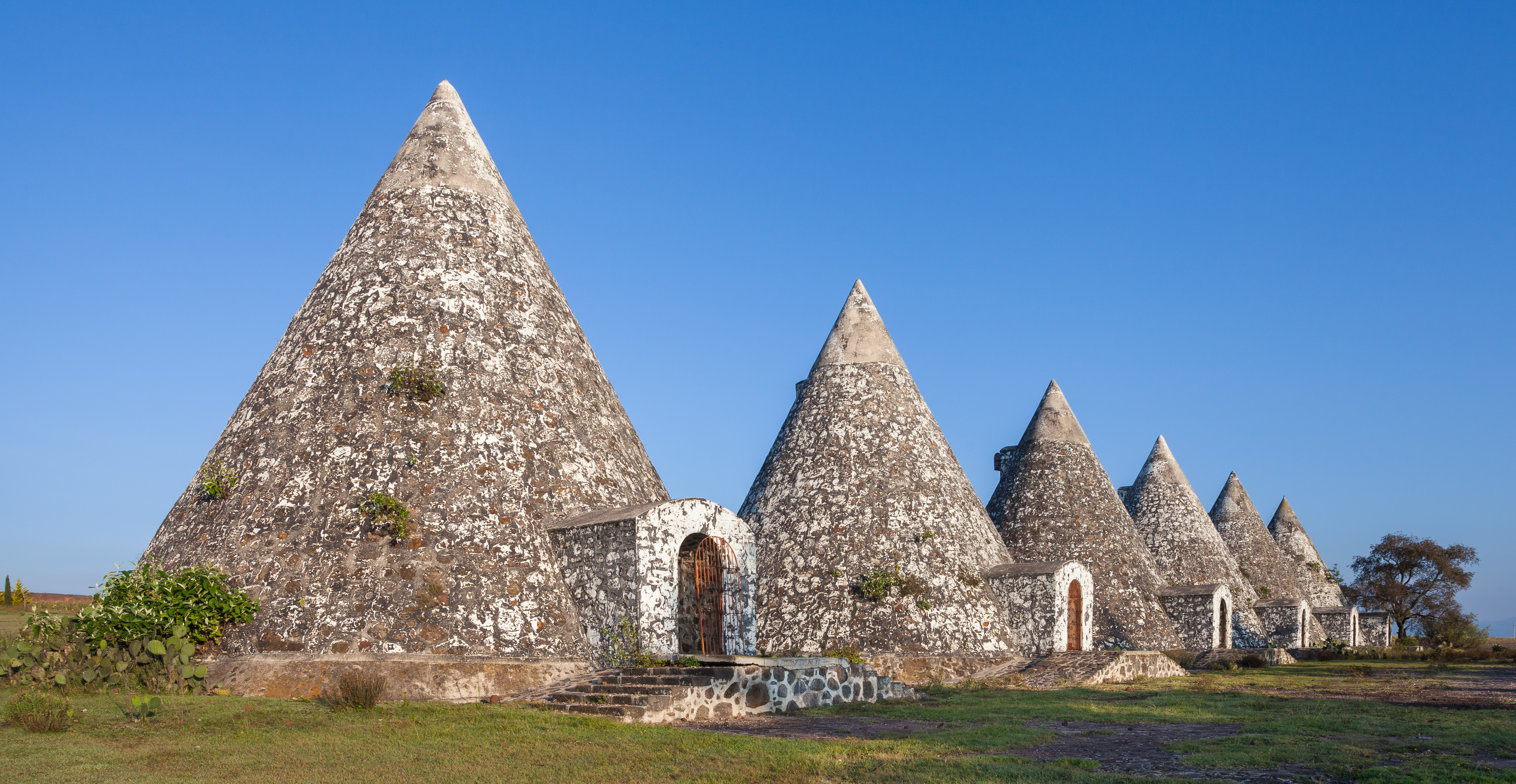
Silos in Acatlán, Hidalgo, Mexico

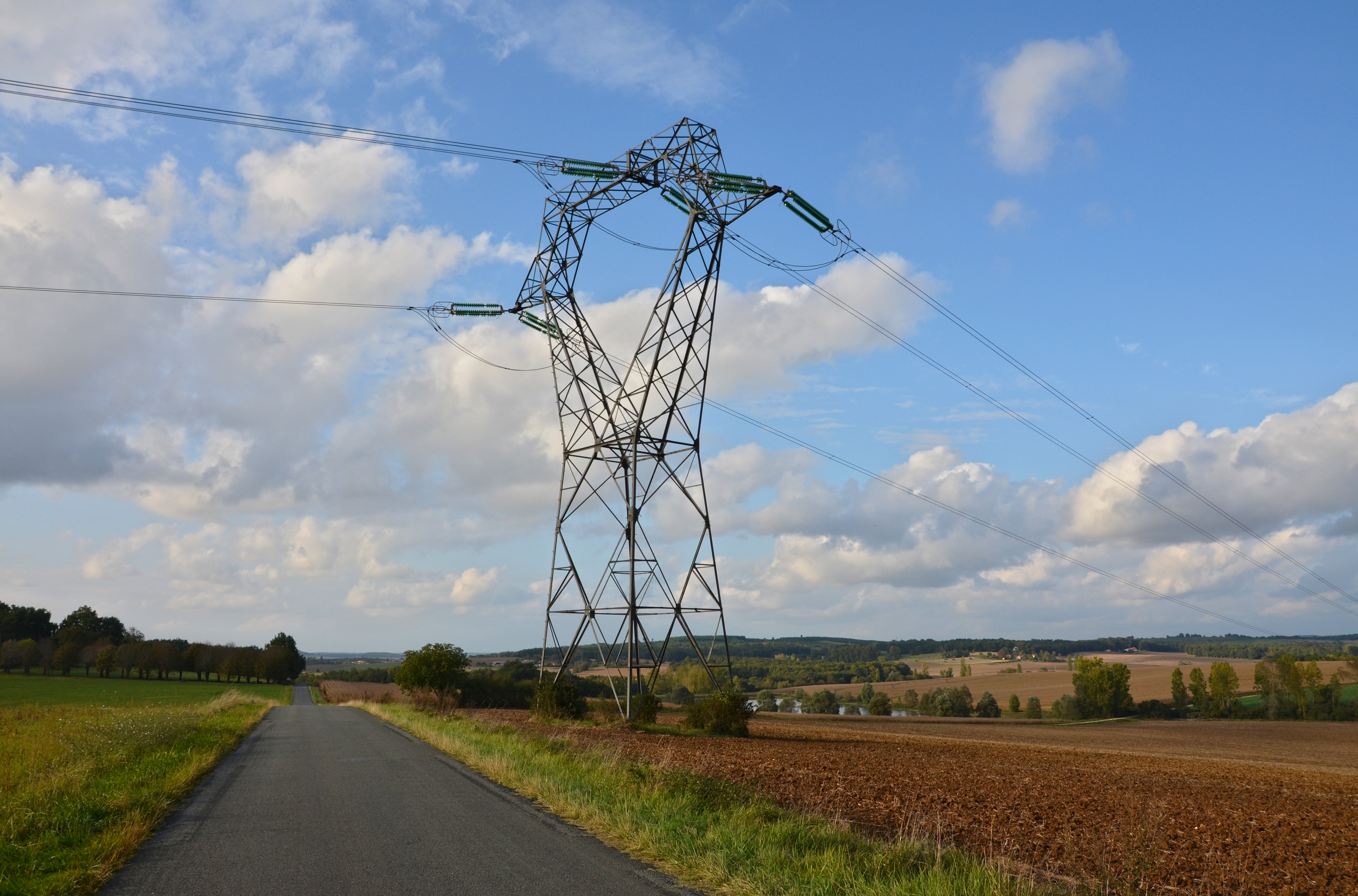
Transmission tower near Le Cluzeau, Saint-Romain, France

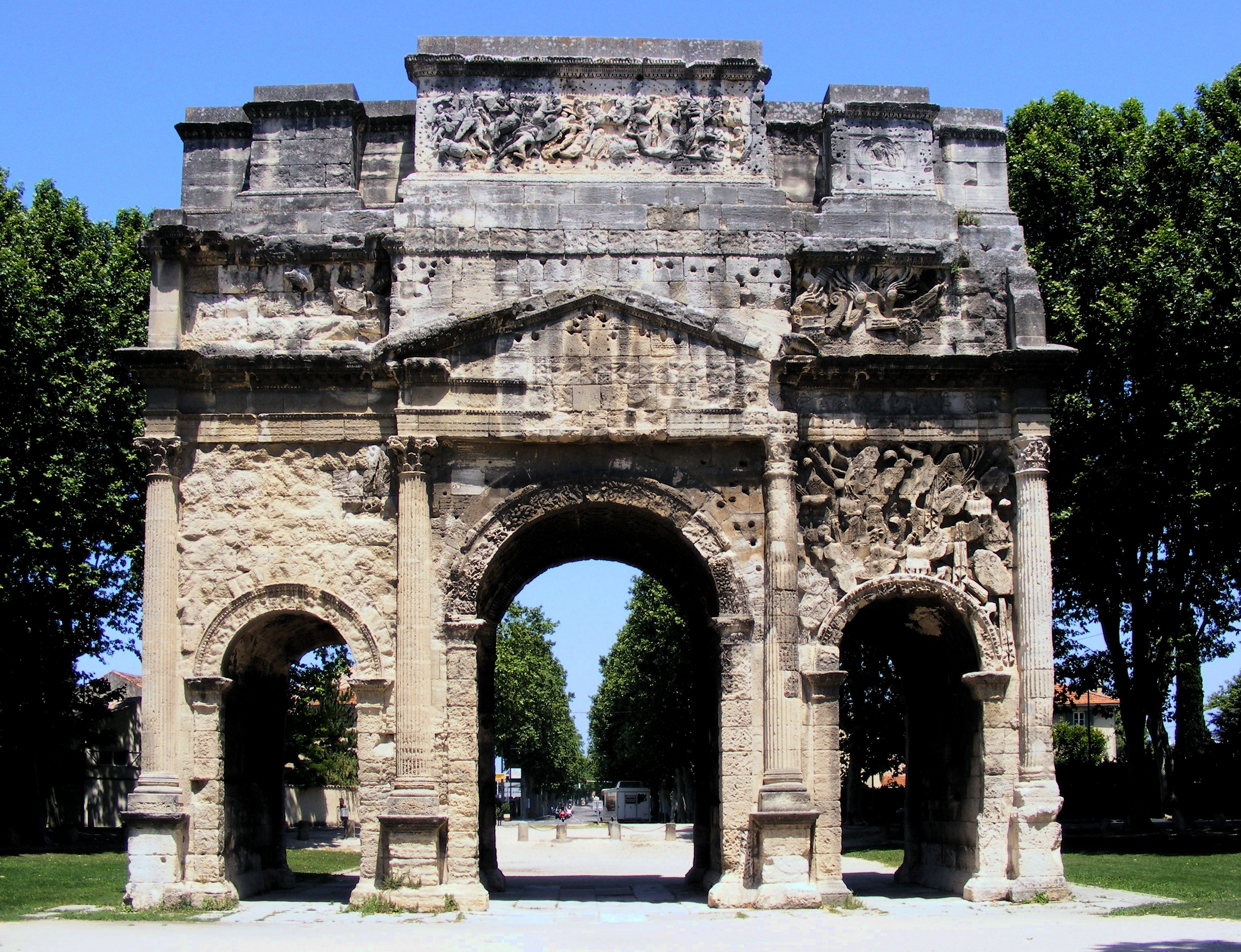
The Triumphal Arch of Orange, France

A nonbuilding structure, often referred to simply as a structure, is any built structure or construction structure that is not a building, i.e. not designed for continuous human occupancy. The term is particularly used by architects, structural engineers, and mechanical engineers to distinguish load-bearing structures not designed for continuous human occupancy.

== Examples ==
- Aerial lift pylons
- Aerial tramways
- Avalanche dams
- Barriers
- Beehive stone
- Blast furnaces
- Boat lifts
- Brick kilns
- Bridges and bridge-like structures (aqueducts, overpasses, trestles, viaducts, etc.)
  - Covered bridges
- Bus stops
- Canals
  - Aqueduct
    - Acequia
- Carports
- Chimneys and flue-gas stacks
- Coke ovens
- Dams
- Docks
- Dolphins
- Driveways
- Elevators
- Fountains
- Ferris wheels
- Ferry slips
- Flumes
- Footpaths
- Fortifications
- Fractionating towers
- Garden
- Gates
  - Gate guardian
  - Pylon
  - Triumphal arches
- Granaries
- Greenhouses
  - Conservatories
- Hayracks
- Hay barracks
- Headframes
- Landmarks
- Marinas
- Monoliths
- Megaliths
- Memorials
  - Monuments
- Mounds
  - Stupas
- Offshore oil platforms (except for the production and housing facilities)
- Oil depots
- Oil platforms
- Piers
- Pitch
- Radio masts and towers
- Railroads
- Ramadas
- Retaining walls
- Roads
- Roller coasters
- Sheds
- Ski lifts
- Silos
- Storage tanks
- Street lights
- Street signs
- Swimming pools
- Structures designed to support, contain or convey liquid or gaseous matter, including
  - Cooling towers
  - Distillation equipment and structural supports at chemical and petrochemical plants and oil refineries
- Tank farms
- Thoroughfares
- Tombs
  - Pyramids
- Towers of some types
  - Bell tower
  - Communications towers
  - Lattice towers
  - Obelisks
  - Transmission towers
  - Water towers
- Tunnels
- Underwater habitats
- Wharves
- Windmills

== Exceptions ==
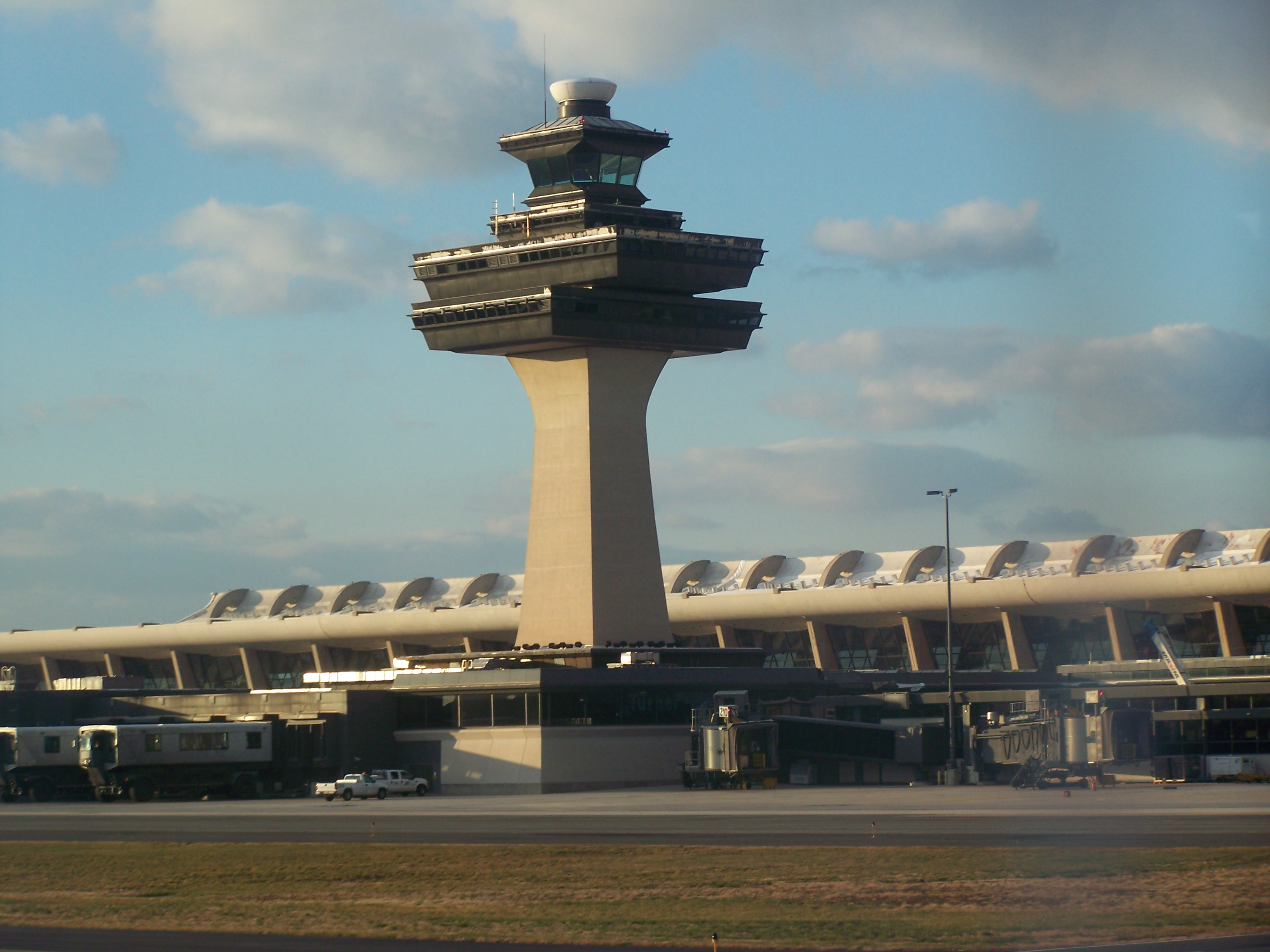
Dulles Airport control tower

Some structures that are occupied periodically and would otherwise be considered "nonbuilding structures" are categorized as "buildings" for life and fire safety purposes:

- Aviation control towers
- Cruise ships
- Factories
- Kiosks
- Lighthouses
- Outhouses
- Power stations
- Refineries
- Warehouses

== See also ==
- Architectural engineering
- Infrastructure
