= Hagenbeck =

Hagenbeck may refer to:

- Tierpark Hagenbeck, a zoo in Hamburg
- Hagenbeck-Wallace Circus, American circus
- Haus Hagenbeck, a castle in Dorsten
- Zeche Vereinigte Hagenbeck, a mine in Essen-Altendorf
- Circus Carl Hagenbeck and Circus Wilhelm Hagenbeck (later Circus Willy Hagenbeck), German circusses

== People ==
- Franklin L. Hagenbeck (born 1949), general of the US Army

Gottfried C. Carl with his descendants:

- Gottfried Claes Carl Hagenbeck (1810–1887), German businessman and founder of Hagenbeck's animal dealing
  - Carl Hagenbeck (1844–1913), German animal dealer, zoo- and circus-director
  - Wilhelm Hagenbeck (1850–1910), German circus-director
    - Willy Hagenbeck (1884–1965), German circus-director
  - John Hagenbeck (1866–1940), organizer of human zoos, half-brother of Carl Hagenbeck
    - John George Hagenbeck (1900–1959), ship dealer and organizer of human zoos, son of John Hagenbeck

== See also ==
- Haghenbeck, a surname
