= Cuautepec de Hinojosa =

- Town and municipality
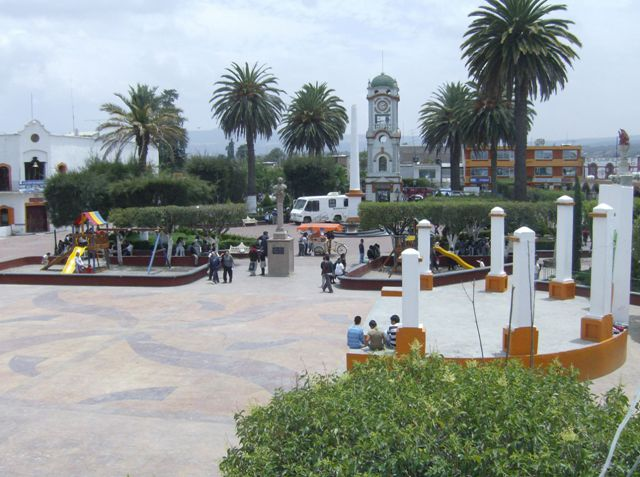
- Main square in Cuautepec

- Coat of arms

- Location within Hidalgo Location within Mexico
- Coordinates: 20°09′N 98°26′W
- Country: Mexico
- State: (Hidalgo (state)) Hidalgo
- Municipality: Cuautepec de Hinojosa

Government
  - Federal electoral district: Hidalgo's 4th

Area
  - Total: 372.6 km^{2} (143.9 sq mi)

Population (2005)
  - Total: 45,527
- Time zone: UTC-6 (Zona Centro)
- Website: cuautepechidalgo.gob.mx

Cuautepec de Hinojosa is a town and one of the 84 municipalities of Hidalgo, in central Mexico. The municipal seat lies at Cuautepec de Hinojosa. The municipality covers an area of 372.6 km^{2} (143.9 sq mi).

As of 2020, the municipality had a total population of 64,421.
