= José Antonio Haghenbeck =

Mexican politician

- Born: José Antonio del Sagrado Corazón Haghenbeck Cámara; 7 June 1955 (age 71); Tehuacán, Puebla, Mexico
- Education: La Salle University
- Occupations: Physician, surgeon and politician
- Political party: PAN

José Antonio del Sagrado Corazón Haghenbeck Cámara (Note: In this Mexican name, the surname is Haghenbeck and the second or maternal family name is Cámara.) (born 7 June 1955) is a Mexican surgeon, physician and politician affiliated with the National Action Party (PAN).

Haghenbeck Cámara was born in Tehuacán, Puebla, in 1955. He served as a federal deputy in 1999–2000 during the 57th Congress, representing Hidalgo's 4th district as Francisco Xavier Berganza's alternate. In 2000–2006 he served as a senator for the state of Hidalgo in the 58th and 59th Congresses.

He ran for governor of Hidalgo on the PAN ticket in the 2005 election but lost to Miguel Ángel Osorio Chong.
