= Tulancingo =

- City and municipality
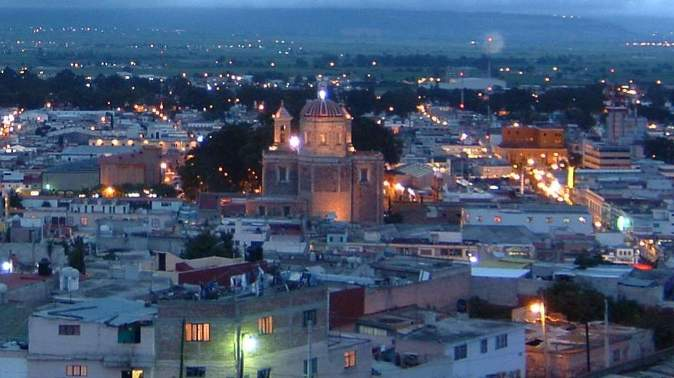
- An evening view of Tulancingo, from the Cerro del Tezontle

- Coat of arms

- Location within Hidalgo Location within Mexico
- Coordinates: 20°5′0″N 98°22′0″W
- Country: Mexico
- State: Hidalgo
- Municipality: Tulancingo

Government
  - Municipal President: Jorge Márquez Alvarado
  - Federal electoral district: Hidalgo's 4th

Area
  - Total: 290.4 km^{2} (112.1 sq mi)
- Elevation: 2,181 m (7,156 ft)

Population (2010)
  - Total: 151,582
  - Density: 352.64/km^{2} (913.3/sq mi)
- Time zone: UTC-6 (Zona Centro)
- Postal code: 43700
- Website: www.tulancingo.gob.mx

Tulancingo (officially Tulancingo de Bravo, for Nicolás Bravo; Otomi: Ngu̱hmu) is the second-largest city in the Mexican state of Hidalgo. It is located in the southeastern part of the state and also forms one of the 84 municipalities of Hidalgo, as well as the Archdiocese of Tulancingo. Located 93 km from Mexico City, this area is the most important wool textile producer in the country and was home to El Santo, Mexico's most famous lucha libre wrestler, and to Gabriel Vargas (cartoonist), author of the popular cartoon La Familia Burrón. It is also home to the Huapalcalco archeological site, which was the forerunner to the Teotihuacan civilization. The name derives from the Nahuatl words "tule" and "tzintle" which mean "in or behind the reeds." This is confirmed by its Aztec glyph.

== History ==
The area is home to some of the oldest settlements in Latin America in Huapalcalco and El Pedregal. These first settlements have been attributed to the Olmeca-Xicallancas and other tribes. A city was founded in 645 BCE by the Toltecs with the name Tolancingo as part of the empire centered in Tula. During this period, the city was home to school and temples. A calendar stone was sculpted here and a temple called Mitlancalco was built to receive the bodies of priests and princes. After 1116 CE, the Toltec Empire declined and the city was abandoned.

According to the Tribute Codex (Códice de los Tributos), the Tulancingo area was a commercial center for the Otomi, Tepehua and Totonaca peoples since about 1000 CE bringing traders from lands now in the states of Hidalgo, Puebla and Veracruz. The market was held every 20 days, and was considered one of the most significant in central Mexico. Traditional trading still exists in the form of the Thursday "tianguis" or market.

The Chichimecas came to rule here under Xolotl starting around 1120. The city was refounded by these people and the remaining Toltecs. The population increased with the arrival of the Tlaxcaltecas. In 1324, a king named Quinatzin, reorganized the area politically, making Tulancingo the head of a province. Tulancingo marched against Texcoco, but was defeated. In the early 15th century, this same Texcoco, under Huitzilihuitl, conquered Tulancingo, putting it within the Aztec Empire. In 1431, the Tulancingo area was again reorganized politically under Itzcoatl and Nezahualcoyotl. Acolhua troops and a tribute collector were stationed here.

During the Spanish Conquest, Prince Ixtlilxochitl gathered an army here to join Hernán Cortés to conquer Tenochtitlan. Officially, the area came under Spanish rule in 1525, and evangelists arrived soon afterwards. The Franciscans arrived from Texcoco to build a hermitage in the Zapotlan neighborhood. This would eventually become the modern cathedral, consecrated to John the Baptist. This was the beginning of the European city, which was initially constructed for the use of Europeans only; no indigenous were allowed to live there. Those indigenous who worked in city were obliged to live outside it on the outskirts at the base of the Cerro del Tezontle. Today this area is known as Colonia Francisco I. Madero and is part of the city proper.

The Valley of Tulancingo was partitioned between Francisco de Avila and Francisco de Terrazas. The fertile soil and warm climate attracted many Spanish settlers, especially older ones. In time, the area became known as the "Retiring place of Old Conquistadors."

During the Mexican War of Independence, the city was attacked several times by insurgents in 1812, 1814 and 1815. However, royalist forces were able to hold the city until Nicolás Bravo and Guadalupe Victoria took it in 1821, near the very end of the war. Bravo remained here for a time, founding a newspaper called El Mosquito de Tulancingo and constructing a gunpowder factory. This would lead to “de Bravo” being added as an appendage to the city's name in 1858. After Agustín de Iturbide was proclaimed emperor in 1822, he maintained a residence in Tulancingo, where he was supported by the populace. When Iturbide was dethroned, he withdrew from Mexico City to Tulancingo on his way to Veracruz and into exile.

Under the 1824 Constitution, Tulancingo was head of a district of the then enormous State of Mexico, which today are the states of Mexico, Hidalgo, Morelos and Guerrero. The Tulancingo district included the areas around Apan, Otumba, Pachuca, and Zempoala.

Despite the ouster of Iturbide, Tulancingo favored a centralist form of government, rather than the state-based federalist one. It would provide refuge to centralists such as Nicolas Bravo during most of the 19th century. Bravo's forces were attacked here by federalist forces under Vicente Guerrero in 1828. Guerrero was victorious and Bravo fled into exile. In 1853, dictator Santa Anna imprisoned federalist Melchor Ocampo in the city. Because the city was loyal to the centralist cause, Ocampo was not placed in prison, but rather allowed to walk the streets where the citizens would supervise him. This continued until Santa Anna decided to send Ocampo out of the country.

During the French Intervention in Mexico, the large State of Mexico was divided into three military districts for defensive purposes. The one in which Tulancingo belonged would eventually become the state of Hidalgo. President Benito Juárez could not hold Tulancingo and French troops entered in 1863. French emperor Maximilian I would use the same house in this city that Iturbide used before. This emperor divided the country into fifty departments, making Tulancingo the head of one of them.

In 1863, Tulancingo made the city the head of a see, under the archbishopric of Mexico City, despite desires to have the head of this see in Huejutla. Its territory included parishes from Puebla, Hidalgo and Mexico State. Soon after Juárez and the federalists ousted the Emperor Maximilian, the state of Hidalgo was created. Tulancingo was considered as a place to locate the new state's capital but Pachuca was chosen instead.

During the Mexican Revolution, forces loyal to Francisco I. Madero under Gabriel Hernandez took Tulancingo in 1910. Madero himself visited in 1912. Forces loyal to Venustiano Carranza took the city in 1915, with Carranza visiting in 1916.

The municipal territory contains a number of small rivers and streams as well as mountainsides, making it susceptible to flooding. Two most recent major floods occurred in 1999 and 2007. Major flooding occurred in and around the city in 1999, with communities such as La Rosa, on the outskirts, the hardest hit, when rivers and streams overflowed. The flooding was caused by heavy and prolonged rainfall which affected several states in the region. Over 500 houses were abandoned in the city at the height of the disaster. Hurricane Dean caused flooding damage again in 2007, when in less than 12 hours of rain, eighteen colonias were underwater with water pouring off mountainsides. Many houses were completely destroyed and a number flooded by sewerage. Those here were among the estimated 100,000 affected in Hidalgo state.

== Geography ==
=== Climate ===
The climate is temperate to cold with an annual average temperature of 14C and average rainfall of between 500 and 550 mm per year. Most rain falls from June to October.

Climate data for Tulancingo (Tulancingo Observatory), elevation: 2,181 m or 7,156 ft, 1951–1980 normals, extremes 1951–2024
| Month | Jan | Feb | Mar | Apr | May | Jun | Jul | Aug | Sep | Oct | Nov | Dec | Year |
|---|---|---|---|---|---|---|---|---|---|---|---|---|---|
| Record high °C (°F) | 29.6 (85.3) | 32.0 (89.6) | 35.0 (95.0) | 35.0 (95.0) | 35.5 (95.9) | 33.0 (91.4) | 29.8 (85.6) | 29.4 (84.9) | 29.0 (84.2) | 37.0 (98.6) | 30.6 (87.1) | 30.2 (86.4) | 37.0 (98.6) |
| Mean daily maximum °C (°F) | 21.3 (70.3) | 22.8 (73.0) | 25.8 (78.4) | 26.5 (79.7) | 26.0 (78.8) | 23.8 (74.8) | 22.5 (72.5) | 22.9 (73.2) | 21.6 (70.9) | 21.1 (70.0) | 21.4 (70.5) | 20.7 (69.3) | 23.0 (73.4) |
| Daily mean °C (°F) | 12.2 (54.0) | 12.9 (55.2) | 15.7 (60.3) | 16.8 (62.2) | 17.2 (63.0) | 16.5 (61.7) | 15.4 (59.7) | 15.6 (60.1) | 15.1 (59.2) | 13.8 (56.8) | 12.8 (55.0) | 11.9 (53.4) | 14.7 (58.5) |
| Mean daily minimum °C (°F) | 2.8 (37.0) | 3.0 (37.4) | 5.7 (42.3) | 7.2 (45.0) | 7.9 (46.2) | 8.3 (46.9) | 7.3 (45.1) | 7.1 (44.8) | 7.5 (45.5) | 5.4 (41.7) | 4.2 (39.6) | 3.1 (37.6) | 5.8 (42.4) |
| Record low °C (°F) | −10.6 (12.9) | −13.8 (7.2) | −7.0 (19.4) | −6.5 (20.3) | −4.0 (24.8) | −3.0 (26.6) | −2.2 (28.0) | −1.7 (28.9) | −5.8 (21.6) | −5.5 (22.1) | −10.0 (14.0) | −8.6 (16.5) | −13.8 (7.2) |
| Average precipitation mm (inches) | 9.7 (0.38) | 5.2 (0.20) | 11.9 (0.47) | 32.4 (1.28) | 49.4 (1.94) | 94.8 (3.73) | 67.4 (2.65) | 65.8 (2.59) | 114.9 (4.52) | 54.3 (2.14) | 21.6 (0.85) | 7.0 (0.28) | 534.4 (21.04) |
| Average precipitation days (≥ 0.1 mm) | 3.07 | 2.40 | 3.44 | 7.03 | 9.14 | 13.46 | 14.74 | 13.96 | 16.24 | 10.18 | 5.40 | 3.03 | 102.09 |
| Average relative humidity (%) | 67 | 64 | 61 | 63 | 66 | 76 | 80 | 78 | 81 | 79 | 74 | 71 | 72 |
| Mean monthly sunshine hours | 221.8 | 218.5 | 227.1 | 212.7 | 227.0 | 192.6 | 183.4 | 200.4 | 150.5 | 187.0 | 201.2 | 199.6 | 2,421.8 |
Source 1: Colegio de Postgraduados
Source 2: SMN

Climate data for Tulancingo (La Espereranza), elevation: 2,210 m or 7,250 ft, extremes 1951–2017
| Month | Jan | Feb | Mar | Apr | May | Jun | Jul | Aug | Sep | Oct | Nov | Dec | Year |
|---|---|---|---|---|---|---|---|---|---|---|---|---|---|
| Record high °C (°F) | 31.0 (87.8) | 32.0 (89.6) | 35.0 (95.0) | 35.0 (95.0) | 37.0 (98.6) | 34.0 (93.2) | 33.0 (91.4) | 30.0 (86.0) | 29.0 (84.2) | 29.0 (84.2) | 30.0 (86.0) | 31.0 (87.8) | 37.0 (98.6) |
| Record low °C (°F) | −9.0 (15.8) | −7.0 (19.4) | −8.0 (17.6) | −3.0 (26.6) | 0.0 (32.0) | 1.0 (33.8) | 0.0 (32.0) | 0.1 (32.2) | 0.0 (32.0) | −2.0 (28.4) | −6.0 (21.2) | −7.0 (19.4) | −9.0 (15.8) |
Source: SMN

== The city ==
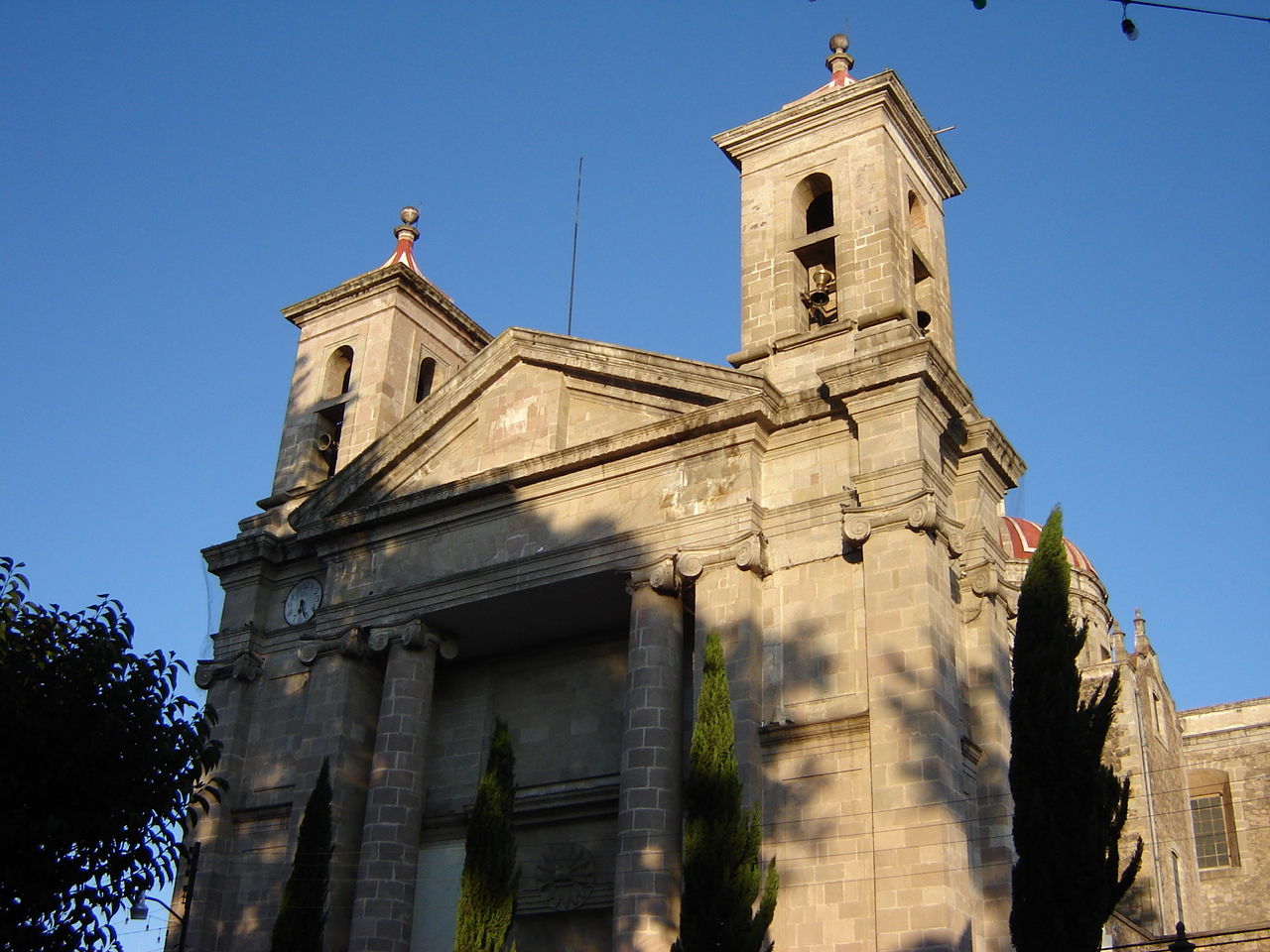
The Tulancingo cathedral

The city is the second largest and second most important in the state. It lies at the foot of the Cerro del Tezontle mountain, which gives views of the city and much of the surrounding valley. At the top there is a restaurant, playground, sports facilities and more. Industrial development has made the city a gateway to the Sierra Poblana and the Mexico's northern Gulf coast. Despite the city's long history, almost no early colonial structures still survive. It has its own Zona Metropolitana defined, containing 3 municipios, 204,708 people in the 2005 census up from 193,638 in 2000, covering some 674 square kilometers.

The city centers on its cathedral and the Jardin Floresta (Floresta Garden). The cathedral's origins date back to 1528 when it was established as a Franciscan monastery, with a church dedicated to Francis of Assisi. This church was reconstructed in 1788 by Damián Ortiz de Castro, and was dedicated to John the Baptist, who is the city's patron saint. The cloister of the old Franciscan monastery was left intact. In 1862, this church became the seat of the diocese or see of Tulancingo, gaining cathedral status. In 2007, Tulancingo became an archdiocese with the seat remaining here. This archdiocese is subject to the archdiocese of Mexico and covers a territory of 8,000 square miles (21,000 km^{2}), or almost the entire state of Hidalgo and a few parishes in Veracruz. The bishop lives in the old cloister complex.

The cathedral is 56.6 meters tall and made of grey sandstone with a sober Neoclassical facade, and a portal flanked by 17-meter-tall (56 ft) Ionic columns. In the interior, there is a holy water font in stone and a wood pulpit decorated with reliefs. There is also an organ with more than 16,000 flutes. The old cloister has rounded arches and ceiling supported by thick wood beams.

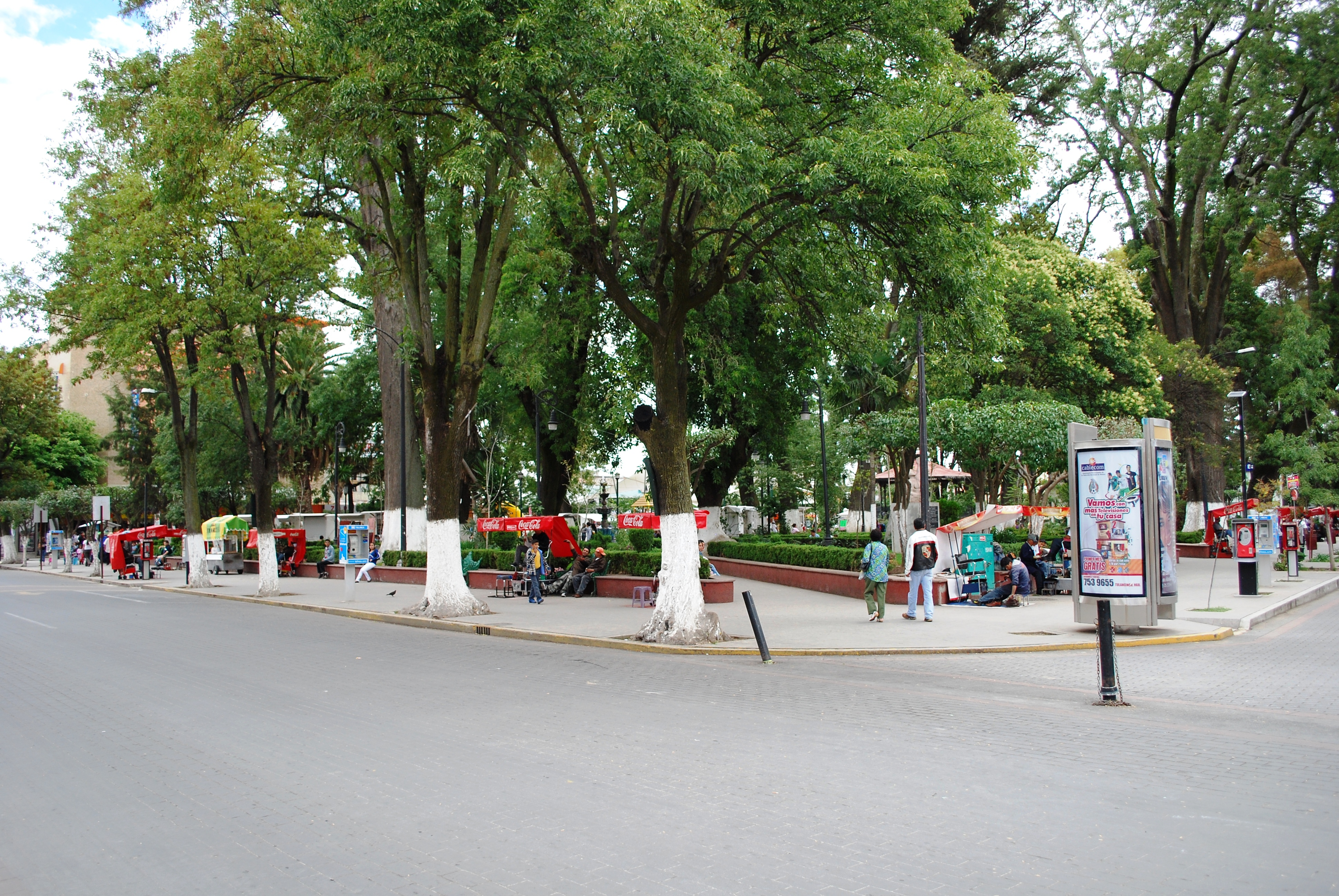
Floresta Garden

The Floresta Garden is formed by two sections, the Plaza de la Constitución and Parque Juárez. This area originally was the "Manzana Fundacional" or Foundation (City) Block and the atrium of the original Franciscan monastery in the early 16th century. Shortly after that time, the name was changed to Jardín Floresta. Leathergoods, cider, hats and wool items can be found for sale in La Floresta.

The city has a number of notable churches. The La Expiración Chapel was constructed in 1527 by Friar Juan de Padilla. It is located in the old Zapotlán neighborhood, one block from the San Miguel Municipal Cemetery. It is one of the few buildings left from when the Franciscans founded the Spanish settlement, and is considered to be the oldest chapel in the region. The Iglesia de los Angeles or Church of the Angels is dedicated to an image of the Virgin Mary called the Virgen de los Angeles, or Virgin de los Angelitos (little angels). Devotion to this image began in 1736, but the name was officially given in 1790. In 1862, she was named as the patroness of the diocese of Tulancingo. The church was begun in 1878, but the case and main altar, sacristy and other features were not built until 1942. In 2008, she was named the sovereign (titular) of the archdiocese. Most major religious processions in the city proceed from here and end at the cathedral. The La Merced Temple was constructed in 1892 by José Antonio Agüero. However, the building collapsed before it was finished, leading to a new construction which exists today. Other notable churches include the San José Church and the Church of La Villita.

The Railroad Museum (Museo del Ferrocarril) is located in the old train station. It contains old photographs of the building's construction, objects from the office from the late 19th and early 20th centuries. Built in 1893 by Gabriel Mancera, this building was the second train station for the city and bears witness to the time period when Tulancingo served as a major hub of transportation and communication in Hidalgo state. Nearby, the Vagón del Ferrocarril (Railroad Car) cafeteria offers crafts and other regional products.

Near the Railroad Museum, at the entrance to the highway that connects Tulancingo to Acatlán and Huasca del Ocampo, is a statue of Tulancingo's famous son, Rodolfo Guzmán Huerta, better known as El Santo or The Silver Mask, Mexico's most famous lucha libre wrestler. The wrestler was born here in 1917 and is buried here as well. A statue was originally placed here in late 1999, and at the same time, the highway it marks was renamed Boulevard Rodolfo Guzman Huerta, El Santo. The ceremony was hosted by his son, a wrestler named El Hijo del Santo and 100 others including various from the lucha libre world. However, the original statue placed here was met with derision among the populace for its diminutive size and "null athletic characteristics," being called the "Monument to E.T." by many residents. The statue suffered vandalism, which even included a few bullet holes. Between 2004 and 2006, the city and El Santo's son worked to replace the statue, eventually hiring self-taught sculptor Edwin Barrera who created the life-sized soldier statues at the military base in the Cuatro Caminos. The current stone monument is 2.30 meters tall and is a reproduction of the wrestler with his cape and mask in a fighting stance.

The Museo de Datos Históricos (Museum of Historical Facts) is in the building that was the first train station for the city. This museum traces the city's history from the pre-Hispanic era to the present day. It contains two rooms: one dedicated to photographs and the other with archeological finds including those of the Huajomulco culture.

The Sor Juana Inés de la Cruz Library is located in a building constructed in the 19th century on what was part of the cathedral's old cemetery. The current library has been in operation since 1984. The Jardin del Arte (Art Garden) and Ricardo Garibay Cultural Center were built were the old Municipal Palace was demolished in 1984. These areas host national and international exhibitions and events featuring art, music and theatrical works.

The Municipal Market is built on what was the Plaza of the Count of Orizaba. In the last decades of the 19th century, it was converted into a market but the building was neglected. In 1948, the current market was constructed. There are five tianguis markets, including one that specializes in counterfeit products (called “fayuca”), two public traditional markets, and a Central de Abastos or wholesale market.

The city has a number of historic homes, mostly dating from the 19th century. The Casa de los Emperadores or House of the Emperors, was used by both Agustín de Iturbide and Maximiliano I as a residence. It is located on the corner of 1 de Mayo and Cuauhtémoc Streets. It is the only house in which both emperors stayed. The Casa de los Huesitos de Chabacano or House of the Little Apricot Pits is a Neoclassical work from the 19th century. The name comes from its owner in the early 20th century who ran a grocery store from the building and would paint apricot pits for neighborhood children to use as toys. The house is still in private hands and located on the corner of Juárez and 1 de Mayo Streets. The Exquitlán Hacienda is a building constructed from the late 19th century by Pánfilo García Otamendi. The work was completed using materials brought from France and was inaugurated in 1908.

The Municipal Zoo has 180 species and a total of 390 animals. Species include lions, tigers, antelopes, lizards, bears, deer and a hippopotamus which is the zoo's mascot. Overlooking the city are a number of large satellite dishes, which were constructed in the 1960s, initially to televise the 1968 Olympic Games. These dishes would give the city the nickname of "City of the Satellites." Today, they provide various services. The two largest satellite dishes are 32 meters in diameter and weigh 330 tons each. These provide international service. A third is 15 meters in diameter and links the country with networks in the United States. The last is only 7 meters and is national. These dishes are the largest and the most important in Mexico.

One distinctive neighborhood whose origins can be traced back to the original founding of the Spanish city is Colonia Francisco I. Madero. Located at the base of the Cerro del Tezontle, it began as an indigenous settlement outside the city proper. As the city grew, it eventually was incorporated. The initial separation of the indigenous from the Europeans allows native culture to survive for a time after the Conquest. Old religious practices were maintained in secret and traditional herbal medicine continued to be practiced. Some residents claimed to be nahuals or Mesoamerican demons, making the Spanish of the city afraid to go into this area. Since then, people of this area have been called derisively "nahuals." More recently, crosses have been placed in this area, especially in the intersection of 16 de Septiembre and Avenide del Trabajo to "scare" the nahuals that supposedly still live here.

The annual Feria de Tulancingo is the main event for the city featuring the commercial, agricultural and industrial activities of the area.

== The municipality ==
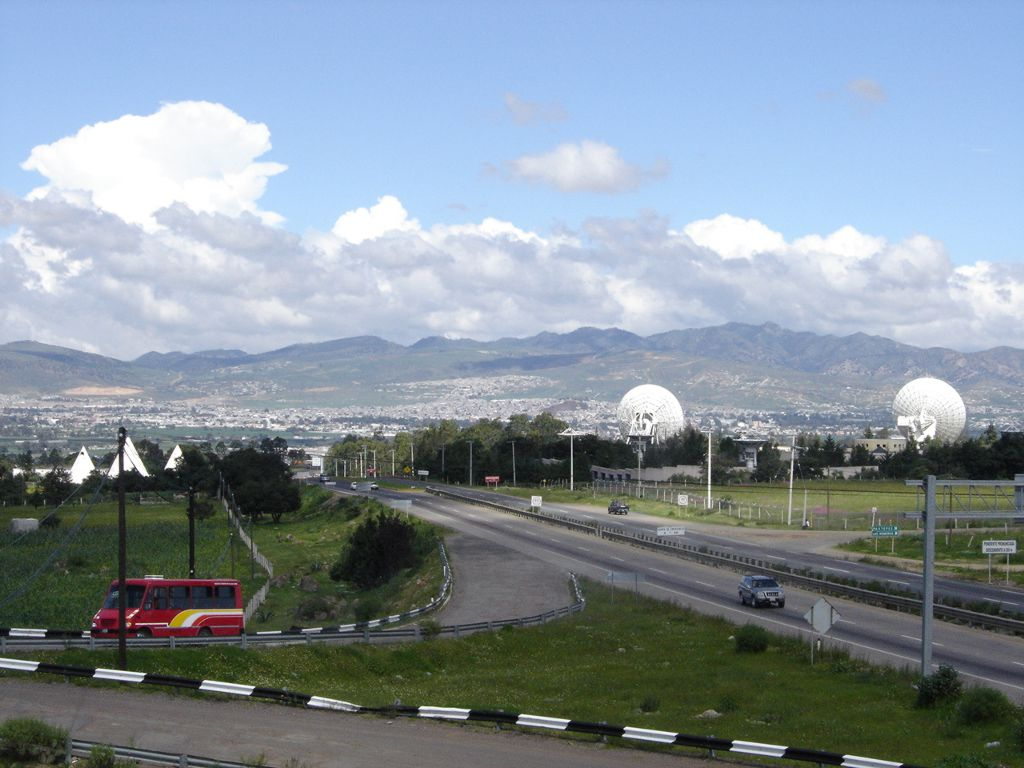
The Tulancingo valley

As municipal seat, the city of Tulancingo is the local governing authority for over one hundred communities, which cover a territory of 290.4 km^{2} (112.1 sq mi). However, about 75% of the municipality's population of 129,935 lives in the city proper. Other major communities include Jaltepec (pop. 5,177), Santa Ana Hueytlalpan (pop. 5,261) and Javier Rojo Gómez (pop. 4,972). The municipality borders the municipalities of Metepec, Acaxochitlán, Cuautepec and Singuilucan.

It is located in the Trans-Mexican Volcanic Belt in the Sierra Hidalgo, as it begins its descent to the Gulf of Mexico. It is mostly valley floor with some peaks. This relatively flat surface is mostly of light volcanic rock cut with ravines, small canyons, large hills and volcanoes. The larger canyons include Los Ermitaños, which forms a "Y" over one kilometer long. The highest point is the Cerro del Tezontle, named after the volcanic rock it is principally made up of. Other elevations include Cerro Viejo, Napateco and Las Navajas. The main river is the Tulancingo River, which is part of the Metztitlán River system. There are four small lakes called Los Alamos, Otontepec, San Alejo and La Ciénega.

The climate is temperate to cold with an annual average temperature of 14C and average rainfall of between 500 and 550 mm per year. Most rain falls from June to October. Forested areas include trees such as pine, ocotea, oyamel, cedar and walnut trees. Most wildlife consist of small mammals such as rabbits and squirrels with birds such as hummingbirds, doves and woodpeckers and reptiles such as snakes.

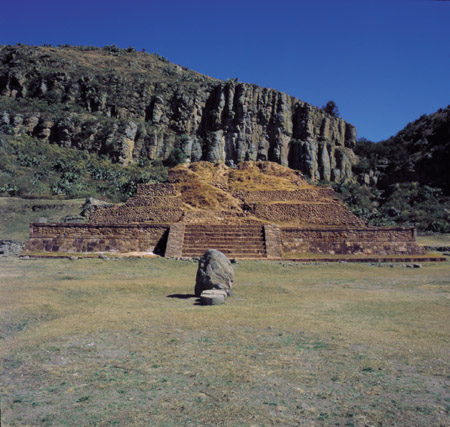
The ruins of Huapalcalco

In the Tulancingo Valley, some of the oldest human remains of Mexico were found in Tecolote Cave. However, the most important site is Huapalcalco. This site is located about three km from the center of modern Tulancingo and contains a pre-Hispanic pyramid and cave paintings. In the cliffs of Huapalcalco and nearby, there are fifty groups of cave paintings, some of which date back as far as 10,000 BCE. The pre-Hispanic site was first excavated in the 1950s by Instituto Nacional de Antropologia e Historia (INAH). Carbon dating has placed objects as far back as 1,100 BCE. In the 7th century, a ruler by the name of Quetzalcoatl ruled here until he left to found Teotihuacan. While the remains of this site do not look impressive, they are the forerunners of the Teotihuacan civilization. The center of the site is a five-level pyramid measuring twelve meters at its base and is eight meters high. The function of this site was that of a ceremonial center. At the top of the pyramid, there is a monolithic altar, which was probably used for the deposit of offerings. The name means House of Green Wood.

Most people of the city are familiar with the San Miguel Municipal Cemetery located on Miguel Hidalgo Street in the main city. However, the city and municipally have a number of notable cemeteries. Cemeteries here are a custom brought and imposed by the Spanish after the Conquest. Prior to this, the indigenous peoples buried their dead underneath their houses. The first cemetery in the city was located next to what is now the cathedral. Today, this cemetery no longer exists, as it has been abandoned and built over. Another notable cemetery in the area is the one at Santa Ana Hueytlalpan, where evidence of Otomi traditions can be seen such as the arrangement of Mexican marigolds and offerings of seasonal fruits, mole, sweets and alcohol. The Santa María Cemetery also has indigenous touches but this one has Nahua influence.

Los Ermitanos is a nature preserve which contains two almost parallel ravines and numerous rock formations such as towers, cliffs and narrow peaks. The area has a cold climate and fog is common.

== Economy ==
The economy of the municipality divides into three sectors, agriculture, manufacturing, industry and mining and commerce. Agriculture employs 5.9% of the population, manufacturing, industry and mining employ 30.5% and commerce employs 63.6%.

The soil is semi arid and fertile. Just over sixty percent of the municipality's land is used for agriculture, pastures and for forest products. There is both seasonal and year-round irrigated agriculture practiced in the municipality. Major crops include corn, barley, beans, wheat and animal feed. Most crops are produced seasonally with the total corn crop divided equally between seasonal and irrigated lands. Crops produced year round and usually irrigated include cactus fruit (tunas), alfalfa and hay. Livestock includes cattle, pigs, goats, sheep, horses and domestic fowl. Pine and some other trees are harvested for wood, but this is heavily regulated. The area is an important dairy product producer as well as a producer of cider, made from locally grown apples.

The city is known as the premier wool textile center in the country, specializing in thread and yarn, cashmeres, blankets, as well as embroidered blouses and skirts During the pre-Hispanic era, this area produced cotton textiles, especially in the mountain areas of Huehuetla and Tenango. These were part of the tribute items collected by the Aztecs. Textile production continued into the colonial period, especially to mining communities in the Real del Monte and Pachuca areas. Sometime during this period, the fabric produced switched to mostly wool. During the late 19th and early 20th centuries, the textile industry here and in the rest of Mexico was modernized and the first train station was opened to ship products. The Mexican Revolution disrupted train service and the textile industry here suffered but came back after the war was over led by the La Esperanza and Santiago Textil factories, and with about 21% of the wool fabric of the country produced here. The textile industry continued to develop with the production of dairy products becoming important as well.

Other industry includes food processing, bottling, tobacco products, textiles, leather goods, wood and paper products, printing, chemicals, plastics and more. The three most important as far as employment are food processing, tobacco and textiles. Handcraft production centers mostly on pottery, making everyday items such as jars, cups and plates. Another craft is the making of leather goods such as sandals, chaps, gloves, etc. Textile items are usually made of wool and include sarapes and rebozos. Pottery includes both burnished and glazed objects. One unique handcrafted item is a type of "God's eye" called a "tenango."

The city has grown rapidly over the past 20 or so years as multinational corporations have moved operations here. However, this growth has put inflationary pressure on goods and services, especially basic foodstuffs as transportation connections here are not as good as in other Mexican cities and foreign interests can pay more for goods. There is still large scale unemployment and underemployment in the area, with many migrating to the United States. Many are men who have moved to Dallas and specialize in selling ice cream.

== Education and infrastructure ==
The municipality provides public education from preschool to university level. There are 68 pre-schools, 29 primary schools and 30 secondary or middle schools, in which 1,225 teachers work. There are ten high schools (bachillerato) and six institutions of higher education. These include the Universidad Tecnologica de Tulancingo http://www.utec-tgo.edu.mx/ and the Universidad Politecnica de Tulancingo http://www.upt.edu.mx/

There are 42.4 km of major roadways with over half being federal and the rest state. There is a small airport with a 1,000 meter runway. Most public transportation is by bus, both locally and inter-city. There are two bus stations, first and second class, out of which operate bus lines to Mexico City, Tampico, Tuxpan, Poza Rica as well as to nearby communities in Hidalgo. There are satellite relay stations providing television reception for six broadcast channels and three local radio stations (XENQ, XEQB and XHTNO).

== Sister cities ==
Pleasanton, California, United States

There is a community exchange program with New York City, New York, USA, due to the large numbers of migrant workers from Tulancingo in New York City.

== Notable people ==
- El Santo (1917-1984)
- Gabriel Vargas (1915-2010), mexican cartoonist, author of La Familia Burrón
- Alfonso Zayas (1941-2021), notable film and television actor, born here
- Jorge Poza
