= María Oralia Vega Ortiz =

Mexican politician

María Oralia Vega Ortíz
- Born: 13 September 1963 (age 62); Pachuca, Hidalgo, Mexico
- Occupation: Politician
- Political party: PRI

María Oralia Vega Ortíz (born 13 September 1963) is a Mexican politician affiliated with the Institutional Revolutionary Party (PRI). In 2006–2009 she served as a federal deputy in the 60th Congress, representing Hidalgo's fourth district.
