= Tulantepec de Lugo Guerrero =

- Municipality
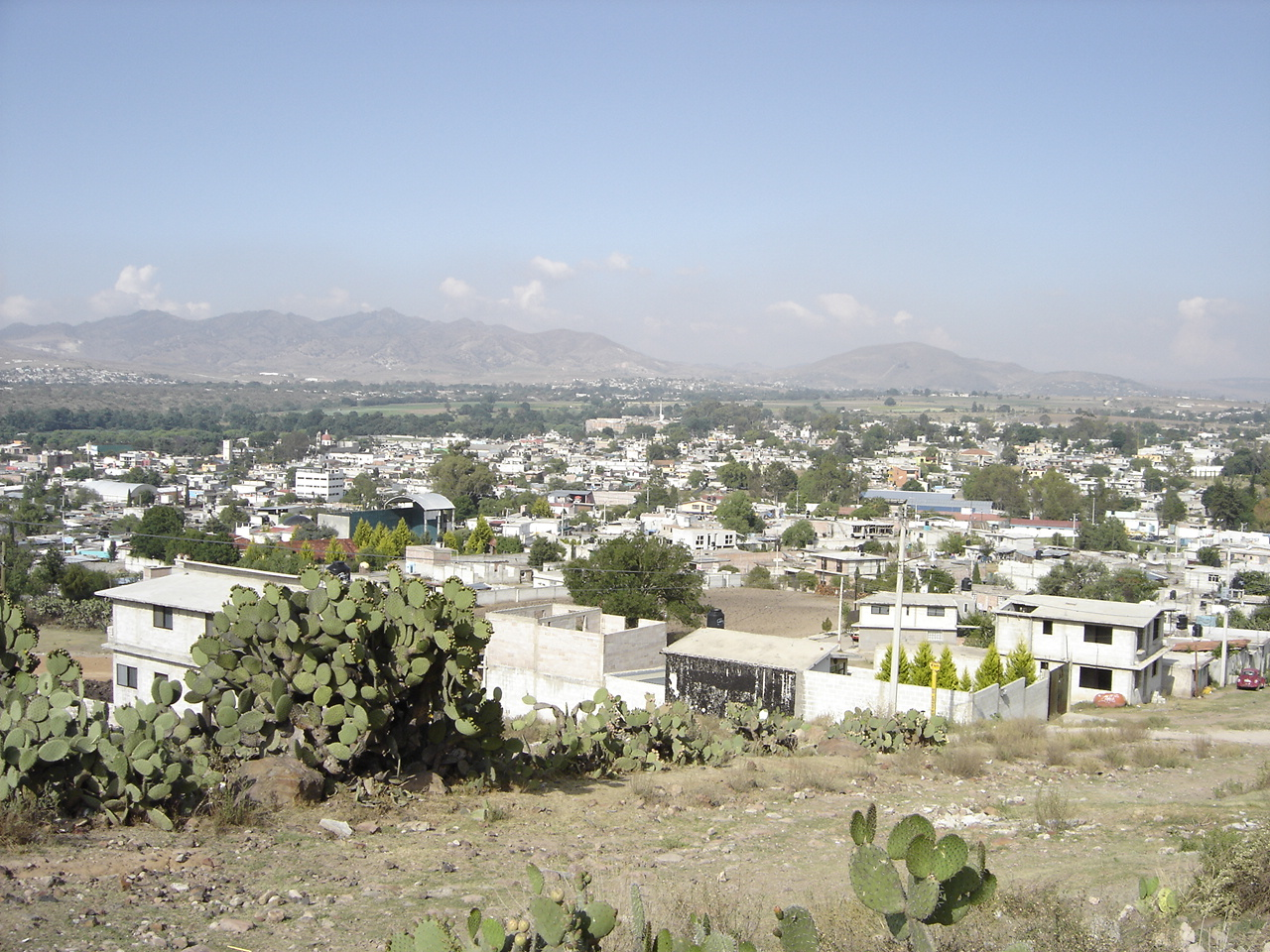
- Santiago Tulantepec

- Coat of arms

- Location within Hidalgo Location within Mexico
- Coordinates: 20°02′18″N 98°21′21″W
- Country: Mexico
- State: Hidalgo
- Municipal seat: Santiago Tulantepec

Government
  - Federal electoral district: Hidalgo's 4th

Area
  - Total: 89.9 km^{2} (34.7 sq mi)

Population (2020)
  - Total: 39,561
- Time zone: UTC-6 (Zona Centro)
- Website: santiagotulantepec.gob.mx

Tulantepec de Lugo Guerrero is one of the 84 municipalities of Hidalgo, in central-eastern Mexico. The municipality covers an area of 89.9 km^{2}.

As of 2020, the municipality had a total population of 39,561, with 47.1% men and 52.9% women. Compared to 2010, the population in Santiago Tulantepec de Lugo Guerrero increased by 18.1%.

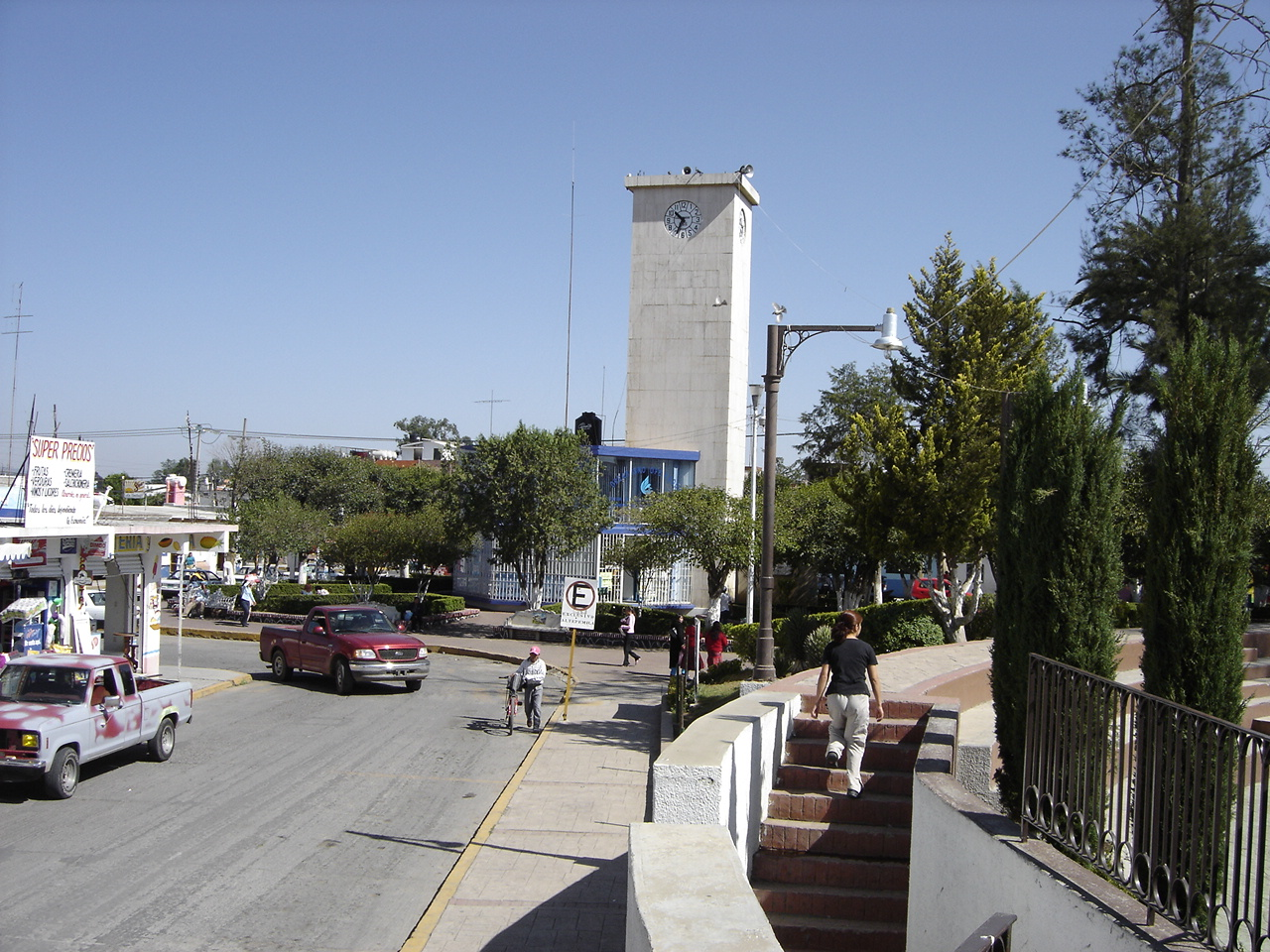
