= Haghenbeck =

Haghenbeck is a surname. Notable people with the surname include:

- Francisco Haghenbeck (1965–2021), Mexican writer and comics screenwriter
- José Antonio Haghenbeck (born 1955), Mexican surgeon, physician, and politician

== See also ==
- Hagenbeck (disambiguation)
