= Congress of Hidalgo =

Legislature of Hidalgo, Mexico

Congress of the Free and Sovereign State of Hidalgo Congreso del Estado Libre y Soberano de Hidalgo
- LXVI Legislature

Type
- Type: Unicameral
- Term limits: 2 consecutive terms

History
- Founded: 16 May 1869

Structure
- Seats: 30 diputados
- Political groups: MORENA (16) PANAL (4) MC (2) PRI (2) PT (2) PVEM (2) PAN (1) PRD (1)
- Length of term: 3 years
- Authority: Political Constitution of the State of Hidalgo
- Salary: MX$47,537 per month

Elections
- Voting system: 18 with first-past-the-post and 12 with proportional representation
- Last election: 2 June 2024
- Next election: 2027

Meeting place
- Pachuca, Hidalgo, Mexico

Website
- congreso-hidalgo.gob.mx

The Congress of the Free and Sovereign State of Hidalgo (Spanish: Congreso del Estado Libre y Soberano de Hidalgo) is the state legislature of the Mexican state of Hidalgo. It convenes in Pachuca, the capital of Hidalgo.

== Elections ==
=== Electoral system ===
The Congress consists of 30 deputies, called diputados. 18 of them are elected by first-past-the-post in single-member districts and 12 are elected by proportional representation. Elections are held every three years, on the first Sunday of June.

=== Electoral districts ===
The 18 single-member districts were determined by the National Electoral Institute (INE) as part of the nationwide 2022–23 redistricting process. Six of them reported Indigenous or Afrodescendent populations of over 40% and were therefore classified as "indigenous districts", with the prerogatives pertaining thereto.

As of the 2024 election, the single-member districts are the following:

District	Seat	Municipalities	Indigenous	Map
1	Zimapán	9	Yes	
2	Zacualtipán	11	Yes	
3	Tlanchinol	8	Yes	
4	Huejutla	3	Yes	
5	Ixmiquilpan	5	Yes	
6	Huichapan	6		
7	Mixquiahuala	6		
8	Actopan	6		
9	Metepec	8	Yes	
10	Zempoala	8		
11	Tulancingo	1		
12	Pachuca	2		
13	Pachuca	1		
14	Tula	3		
15	Tepeji del Río	2		
16	Tizayuca	1		
17	Mineral de la Reforma	1		
18	Tepeapulco	5		

== Members ==
=== Qualifications ===
To be a deputy, a person must be a resident of Hidalgo for no less than three years and be at least 18 years old on the date of the election.

The following cannot serve as deputies:

- The Governor of Hidalgo
- Members of the clergy
- Secretaries of the Executive Branch, judges of the High Court of Justice or the Administrative Court of Justice, Counsellors of the Council of the Judiciary, state Attorney General, Specialized Prosecutor for Corruption Crimes, state Superior Auditor, and public servants of the Federation, who have not separated from their jobs at least 90 days before the election date
- Specialized Prosecutor for Electoral Crimes, Electoral Counselors, members of the State Executive Board of the State Electoral Institute, and Magistrates of the Electoral Court, unless they resign at least one year before the electoral process begins
- District First Instance Judges and Municipal presidents, unless they have resigned at least 90 days before the election date
- Members of the military, unless they have separated from active service at least six months before the election.

=== Terms of office ===
Deputies can serve for two consecutive three-year terms. They take their positions on the fifth day of September following the election.

== Installation and operation ==
Title 6, Chapter 1 of the Political Constitution of the State of Hidalgo sustains and establishes the legality of the Congress. The relevant articles to the Congress are the following:

- Section I: About the Congress
  - Article 28: The name of the Congress.
- Section II: About the election of deputies and installation of the Congress
  - Article 29: Electoral system.
  - Article 30: Rights and obligations of the deputies.
  - Article 31: Requirements to be a deputy.
  - Article 32: Who cannot be elected as a deputy.
  - Article 33: Term limits.
  - Article 34: Immunity of the deputies.
  - Article 35: Prohibitions on holding other positions.
  - Article 36: Renewal of the Congress.
- Section III: About the sessions
  - Article 38: When ordinary sessions are held.
  - Article 39: When extraordinary sessions could be held.
  - Article 40: Penalties for members who miss a plenary session.
  - Article 41: What happens if a deputy misses three consecutive sessions.
  - Article 42: What happens during the two ordinary sessions and information regarding the budget.
  - Article 43: Regarding the Governor attending the Congress.
  - Article 44: When sessions are public.
  - Article 45: Meeting place of the Congress.
  - Article 46: About the Organic Law of the Legislative Branch.
- Section IV: About the initiation and formation of laws and decrees
  - Article 47: To whom the right to initiate the laws and decrees corresponds to.
  - Article 48: Where every presented law or decree initiative should pass through.
  - Article 49: What procedures the initiatives should be subject to.
  - Article 50: What happens in regards to the initiative's author on the initiative's discussion day.
  - Article 51: What happens after a bill or decree is approved.
  - Article 52: When the Governor cannot make observations on bills or decrees of the Congress.
  - Article 53: What happens to bills or decrees not returned by the Governor.
  - Article 54: What happens when a bill or decree is rejected.
  - Article 55: Regarding resolutions and procedures for formation of decrees and economic agreements.
- Section V: About the powers of the Congress
  - Article 56: Powers of the Congress.
- Section VI: About the Superior Auditor
  - Article 56 bis.: Functions of the Superior Audit Office.
- Section VII: About the Permanent Deputation
  - Article 57: Composition of the Permanent Deputation.
  - Article 58: When the Permanent Deputation is elected.
  - Article 59: Powers of the Permanent Deputation.
  - Article 60: When the Permanent Deputation reports.

== 2024 election ==
The most recent election was held on 2 June 2024 for the 66th session (LXVI Legislatura). Of the 30 seats up for election, the National Regeneration Movement won 14 of the single-member districts but was disqualified from the distribution of proportional representation seats; the other four single-member district seats went to its coalition partner, the Nueva Alianza Hidalgo (PNAH). The winners of the plurinominal seats were announced by the Hidalgo State Electoral Institute on 8 August: two for the PNAH, three for the PT, two each for the PRI, PVEM and MC, and one for the PAN.
