= 4th federal electoral district of Hidalgo =

Federal electoral district of Mexico

Hidalgo's 4th
- Electoral district of the Chamber of Deputies of Mexico

- 4th district since 2017

Incumbent
- Member: Alma Lidia de la Vega Sánchez
- Party: ▌Morena
- Congress: 66th (2024–2027)

District
- State: Hidalgo
- Head town: Tulancingo
- Coordinates: 20°5′N 98°22′W
- Covers: 10 municipalities: Acatlán, Acaxochitlán, Agua Blanca de Iturbide, Cuautepec de Hinojosa, Huehuetla, Metepec, San Bartolo Tutotepec, Tulantepec de Lugo Guerrero, Tenango de Doria, Tulancingo de Bravo
- PR region: Fourth
- Precincts: 193
- Population: 417,765 (2020 census)

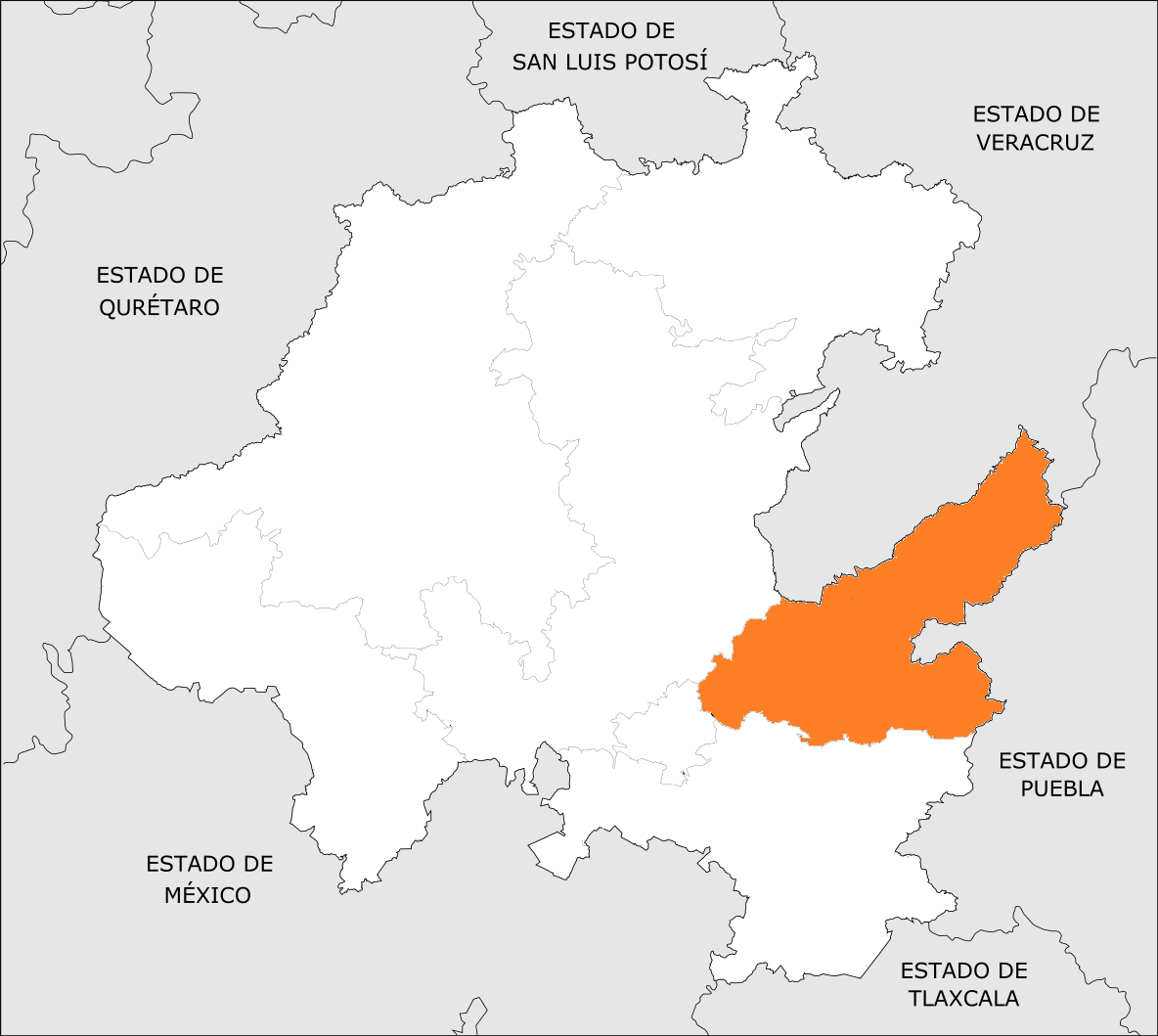
4th district in 2005–2017

The 4th federal electoral district of Hidalgo (Spanish: Distrito electoral federal 04 de Hidalgo) is one of the 300 electoral districts into which Mexico is divided for elections to the federal Chamber of Deputies and one of seven such districts in the state of Hidalgo.

It elects one deputy to the lower house of Congress for each three-year legislative period by means of the first-past-the-post system. Votes cast in the district also count towards the calculation of proportional representation ("plurinominal") deputies elected from the fourth electoral region. (Note: Between 2005 and 2023, Hidalgo was assigned to the fifth region.)

The current member for the district, elected in the 2024 general election, is Alma Lidia de la Vega Sánchez of the National Regeneration Movement (Morena).

== District territory ==
Under the 2023 districting plan adopted by the National Electoral Institute (INE), which is to be used for the 2024, 2027 and 2030 federal elections, the district is located in the east of the state and its head town (cabecera distrital), where results from individual polling stations are gathered together and tallied, is the city of Tulancingo. It covers 193 electoral precincts (secciones electorales) across ten of the state's municipalities:

- Acatlán, Acaxochitlán, Agua Blanca de Iturbide, Cuautepec de Hinojosa, Huehuetla, Metepec, San Bartolo Tutotepec, Tulantepec de Lugo Guerrero, Tenango de Doria and Tulancingo de Bravo.

The district reported a population of 417,765 in the 2020 census.

== Previous districting plans ==
Evolution of electoral district numbers
| | 1974 | 1978 | 1996 | 2005 | 2017 | 2023 |
|---|---|---|---|---|---|---|
| Hidalgo | 5 | 6 | 7 | 7 | 7 | 7 |
| Chamber of Deputies | 196 | 300 | | | | |

2017–2022

Between 2017 and 2002, the 4th district covered the same 10 municipalities as in the 2023 plan.

2005–2017

Under the 2005 districting plan, the district covered 11 municipalities:
- Acatlán, Acaxochitlán, Agua Blanca de Iturbide, Huasca de Ocampo, Huehuetla, Metepec, Mineral del Monte, Omitlán de Juárez, San Bartolo Tutotepec, Tenango de Doria and Tulancingo de Bravo.

1996–2005

The 1996 redistricting process created Hidalgo's 7th district. A slightly different group of 11 municipalities made up the 4th district between 1996 and 2005:
- Acatlán, Acaxochitlán, Agua Blanca de Iturbide, Huasca de Ocampo, Huehuetla, Metepec, Omitlán de Juárez, San Bartolo Tutotepec, Tulantepec de Lugo Guerrero, Tenango de Doria and Tulancingo de Bravo.

1978–1996

The districting scheme in force from 1978 to 1996 was the result of the 1977 electoral reforms, which increased the number of single-member seats in the Chamber of Deputies from 196 to 300. Under that plan, Hidalgo's seat allocation rose from five to six. The 4th district's head town was at Huejutla and it comprised 13 municipalities in the north of the state:
- Atlapexco, Calnali, Huautla, Huazalingo, Huejutla, Jaltocán, Lolotla, Molango, Orizatlán, Tepehuacán, Tlanchinol, Xochiatipan and Yahualica.

== Deputies returned to Congress ==
(Mexico) National parties
- Current
- PAN
- PRI
- PT
- PVEM
- MC
- Morena
- PAZ
- Somos
- Defunct or local only
- PLM
- PNR
- PRM
- PNM
- PP
- PPS
- PARM
- PFCRN
- CON
- PANAL
- PSD
- PES
- PES
- PRD

Hidalgo's 4th district
| Election | Deputy | Party | Term | Legislature |
|---|---|---|---|---|
| 1916 | None | | 1916–1917 | Constituent Congress of Querétaro |
| 1917 | Samuel H. Mariel | PLC | 1917–1918 | 27th Congress |
| 1918 | Samuel H. Mariel | PLC | 1918–1920 | 28th Congress |
| 1920 | Jesús F. Azuara | | 1920–1922 | 29th Congress |
| 1922 | Jesús F. Azuara | | 1922–1924 | 30th Congress |
| 1924 | Oscar B. Santander | | 1924–1926 | 31st Congress |
| 1926 | Enrique Medécigo Rosas | | 1926–1928 | 32nd Congress |
| 1928 | Jesús Medécigo Rosas | | 1928–1930 | 33rd Congress |
| 1930 | Enrique Viveros | Institutional Revolutionary Party | 1930–1932 | 34th Congress |
| 1932 | Arcadio Cornejo | Institutional Revolutionary Party | 1932–1934 | 35th Congress |
| 1934 | Wilfrido Osorio H. | Institutional Revolutionary Party | 1934–1937 | 36th Congress |
| 1937 | Vicente Aguirre del Castillo | Institutional Revolutionary Party | 1937–1940 | 37th Congress |
| 1940 | Gregorio Hernández | Institutional Revolutionary Party | 1940–1943 | 38th Congress |
| 1943 | Raúl Lozano Ramírez | | 1943–1946 | 39th Congress |
| 1946 | Juvencio Nochebuena Palacios | Institutional Revolutionary Party | 1946–1949 | 40th Congress |
| 1949 | Domitilo Austria García | Institutional Revolutionary Party | 1949–1952 | 41st Congress |
| 1952 | Juvencio Nochebuena Palacios | Institutional Revolutionary Party | 1952–1955 | 42nd Congress |
| 1955 | Agustín Mariel Anaya | Institutional Revolutionary Party | 1955–1958 | 43rd Congress |
| 1958 | Francisco Rivera Carretta | Institutional Revolutionary Party | 1958–1961 | 44th Congress |
| 1961 | Gontrán Noble Pérez y Revilla | Institutional Revolutionary Party | 1961–1964 | 45th Congress |
| 1964 | Raúl Lozano Ramírez | Institutional Revolutionary Party | 1964–1967 | 46th Congress |
| 1967 | José Gonzalo Badillo Ortiz | Institutional Revolutionary Party | 1967–1970 | 47th Congress |
| 1970 | Abel Ramírez Acosta | Institutional Revolutionary Party | 1970–1973 | 48th Congress |
| 1973 | Javier Hernández Lara | Institutional Revolutionary Party | 1973–1976 | 49th Congress |
| 1976 | José Antonio Zorrilla Pérez | Institutional Revolutionary Party | 1976–1979 | 50th Congress |
| 1979 | Jesús Murillo Karam | Institutional Revolutionary Party | 1979–1982 | 51st Congress |
| 1982 | Onofre Hernández Rivera | Institutional Revolutionary Party | 1982–1985 | 52nd Congress |
| 1985 | Juan Carlos Alva Calderón | Institutional Revolutionary Party | 1985–1988 | 53rd Congress |
| 1988 | Orlando Arvizu Lara | Institutional Revolutionary Party | 1988–1991 | 54th Congress |
| 1991 | Joel Guerrero Juárez | Institutional Revolutionary Party | 1991–1994 | 55th Congress |
| 1994 | Roberto Pedraza Martínez | Institutional Revolutionary Party | 1994–1997 | 56th Congress |
| 1997 | Francisco Xavier Berganza; José Antonio Haghenbeck Cámara | National Action Party (Mexico) | 1997–1999; 1999–2000 | 57th Congress |
| 2000 | Gerardo Sosa Castelán | Institutional Revolutionary Party | 2000–2003 | 58th Congress |
| 2003 | Óscar Bitar Haddad | Institutional Revolutionary Party | 2003–2006 | 59th Congress |
| 2006 | María Oralia Vega Ortiz | Institutional Revolutionary Party | 2006–2009 | 60th Congress |
| 2009 | David Penchyna Grub | Institutional Revolutionary Party | 2009–2012 | 61st Congress |
| 2012 | Emilse Miranda Munive | Institutional Revolutionary Party | 2012–2015 | 62nd Congress |
| 2015 | Cesáreo Jorge Márquez Alvarado | Ecologist Green Party of Mexico | 2015–2018 | 63rd Congress |
| 2018 | María Isabel Alfaro Morales | National Regeneration Movement | 2018–2021 | 64th Congress |
| 2021 | María Isabel Alfaro Morales | National Regeneration Movement | 2021–2024 | 65th Congress |
| 2024 | Alma Lidia de la Vega Sánchez | National Regeneration Movement | 2024–2027 | 66th Congress |

== Presidential elections ==
Hidalgo's 4th district
| Election | District won by | Party or coalition | % |
|---|---|---|---|
| 2018 | Andrés Manuel López Obrador | Juntos Haremos Historia | 60.1770 |
| 2024 | Claudia Sheinbaum Pardo | Sigamos Haciendo Historia | 63.9596 |
