= Agua Blanca de Iturbide =

- Town and municipality
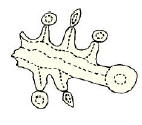
- Coat of arms

- Location within Hidalgo Location within Mexico
- Coordinates: 20°21′N 98°21′W
- Country: Mexico
- State: Hidalgo
- Municipality: Agua Blanca de Iturbide

Government
  - Federal electoral district: Hidalgo's 4th

Area
  - Total: 97.6 km^{2} (37.7 sq mi)

Population (2020)
  - Total: 10,313
- Time zone: UTC-6 (Zona Centro)
- Postal code: 43460–43474
- Website: aguablanca.gob.mx

Agua Blanca de Iturbide is a town and one of the 84 municipalities of Hidalgo, in central-eastern Mexico. The municipality covers an area of 97.6 km^{2}.

As of 2020, the municipality had a total population of 10,313.
