= San Bartolo Tutotepec =

- Town and municipality
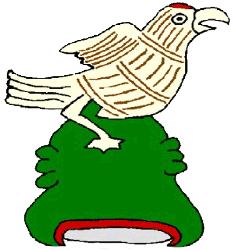
- Coat of arms

- Location within Hidalgo Location within Mexico
- Coordinates: 20°24′N 98°12′W
- Country: Mexico
- State: Hidalgo
- Municipality: San Bartolo Tutotepec

Government
  - Federal electoral district: Hidalgo's 4th

Area
  - Total: 305.8 km^{2} (118.1 sq mi)

Population (2005)
  - Total: 17,837
- Time zone: UTC-6 (Zona Centro)
- Website: sanbartolo.gob.mx

San Bartolo Tutotepec (Otomian languages: Mafani, 'place of the deer') is a town and one of the 84 municipalities of Hidalgo, in central-eastern Mexico. The municipality covers an area of 305.8 km^{2} (118.1 sq mi).

As of 2005, the municipality had a total population of 17,837. In 2017 there were 5,716 inhabitants who spoke an indigenous language, primarily Otomi of the Sierra, Otomi of the valley of Mezquital, and to a lesser extent Tepehua.
