= Acaxochitlán =

- City and municipality
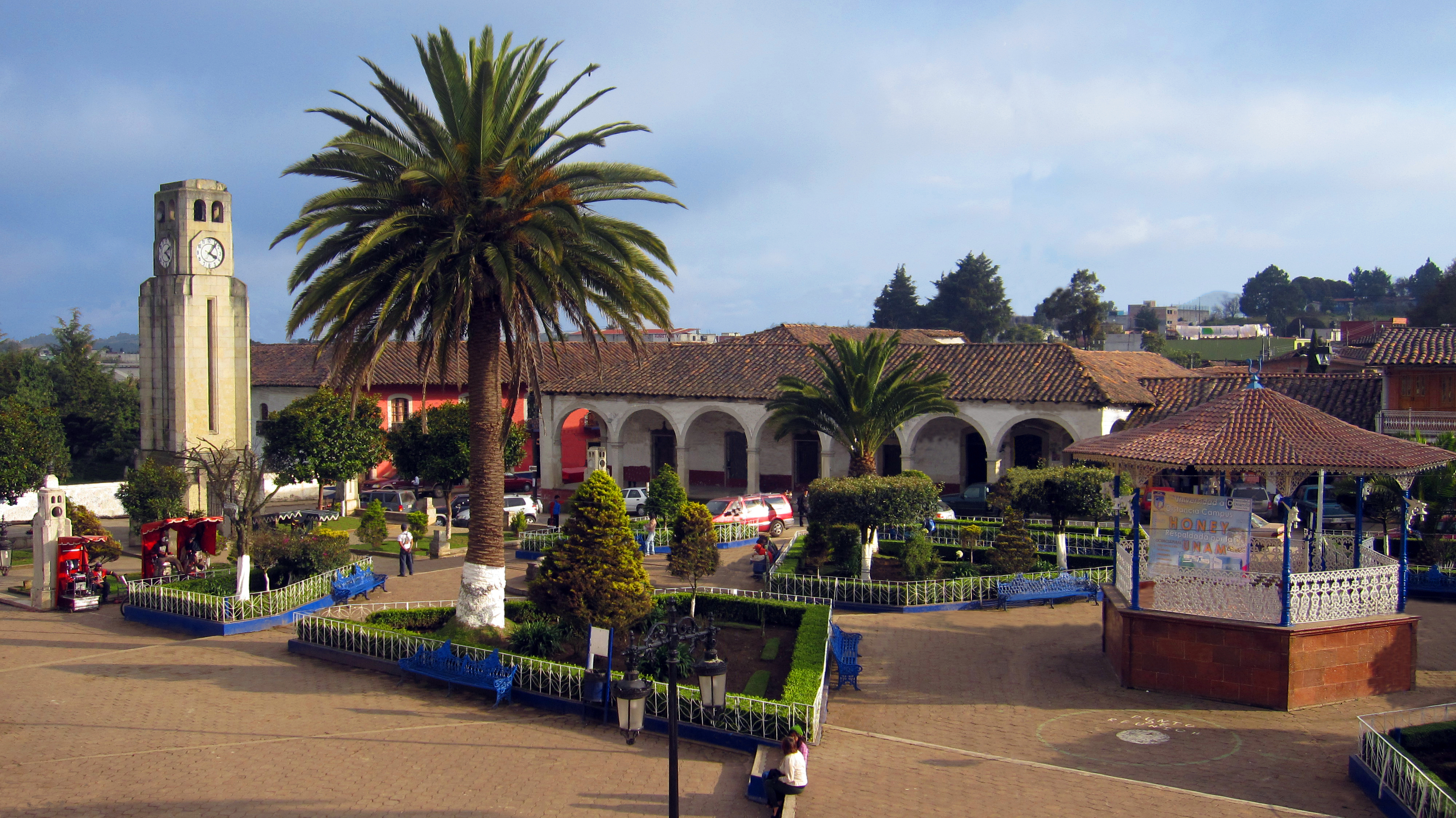

- Coat of arms

- Location within Hidalgo Location within Mexico
- Coordinates: 20°10′N 98°12′W
- Country: Mexico
- State: Hidalgo
- Municipality: Acaxochitlán

Government
  - Federal electoral district: Hidalgo's 4th

Area
  - Total: 226.1 km^{2} (87.3 sq mi)

Population (2020)
  - Total: 46,065
- Time zone: UTC-6 (Zona Centro)
- Website: acaxochitlanhgo.gob.mx

Acaxochitlán is one of the 84 municipalities of the state of Hidalgo, in central-eastern Mexico. The municipality covers an area of 226.1 km^{2}. As of 2005, the municipality had a total population of 34,892. Acaxochitlan has three languages; Nahuatl, Spanish, and Otomi.

In 2023, Acaxochitlan was designated a Pueblo Mágico by the federal government, recognizing its cultural and historical importance.

== Etymology ==
Its name derives from the Nahuatl words "acatl" meaning "cane," and "xochitl" meaning "flower", which form the word "acaxochitl," a term also used to designate a plant belonging to the reed family and its red flowers. The suffix "tlan" means "place." Thus, the name Acaxochitlán translates as "place of abundant Acaxochitl" or "place where the reed bears flowers."

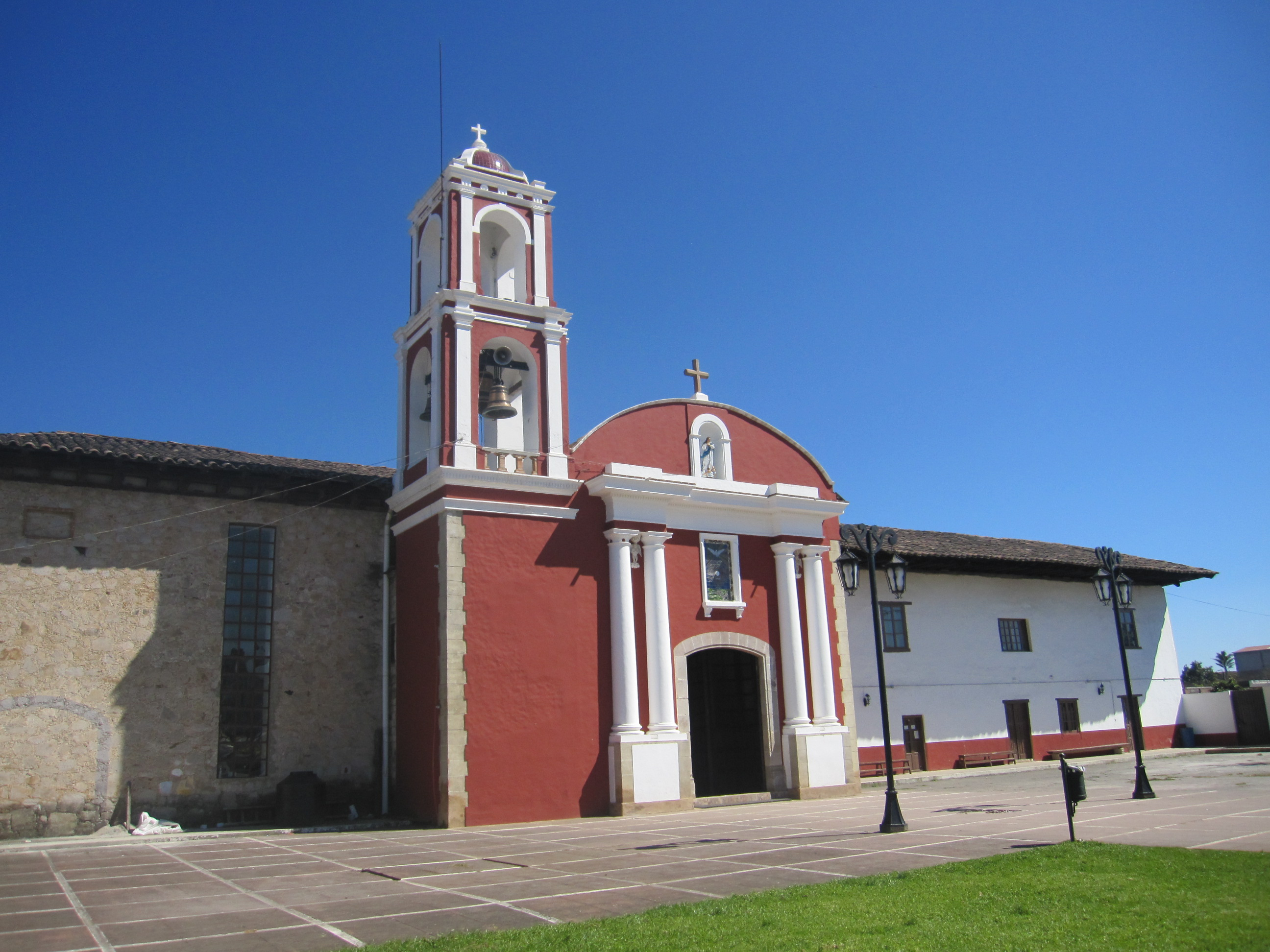
chapel of Our Lady of Guadalupe.
