= Metepec, Hidalgo =

Metepec
- Town and municipality
- Coat of arms

- Location within Hidalgo Location within Mexico
- Coordinates: 20°14′17″N 98°19′19″W
- Country: Mexico
- State: Hidalgo
- Municipality: Metepec

Government
  - Federal electoral district: Hidalgo's 4th

Area
  - Total: 192.7 km^{2} (74.4 sq mi)

Population (2020)
  - Total: 13,078
- Time zone: UTC-6 (Zona Centro)
- Website: metepechidalgo.gob.mx/

Metepec is a town and one of the 84 municipalities of Hidalgo, in central-eastern Mexico. The municipality covers an area of 192.7 km^{2} (74.4 sq mi).

In 2005, the municipality had a total population of 9,278. By 2020, it had risen to 13,078.
