= Contepec =

- Municipality
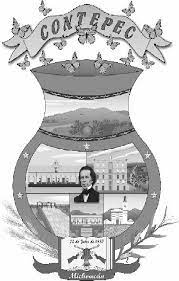
- Coat of arms

- Location within Michoacán Location within Mexico
- Coordinates: 19°57′14″N 100°09′49″W
- Country: Mexico
- State: Michoacán
- Established: 24 July 1857
- Seat: Contepec

Government
  - President: Ruben Rodríguez Jiménez

Area
  - Total: 381.725 km^{2} (147.385 sq mi)
- Elevation (of seat): 2,497 m (8,192 ft)

Population (2010 Census)
  - Total: 32,954
  - Estimate (2015 Intercensal Survey): 34,193
  - Density: 86.329/km^{2} (223.59/sq mi)
  - Seat: 4,184
- Time zone: UTC-6 (Central)
- Postal codes: 61020–61055
- Area code: 447
- Website: Official website

Contepec is a municipality in the Mexican state of Michoacán, located 110 kilometres (68 mi) east of the state capital of Morelia, being the easternmost municipality in Michoacán.

== Geography ==
The municipality of Contepec is located in the Trans-Mexican Volcanic Belt in northeast Michoacán at an altitude between 2,100 and 3,200 metres (6,900–10,500 ft). It borders the Michoacano municipalities of Epitacio Huerta to the northwest, Maravatío to the west, and Tlalpujahua to the southwest, as well as the municipalities of Amealco de Bonfil in Querétaro to the northeast, and Temascalcingo and El Oro de Hidalgo of the State of Mexico to the east and southeast. The municipality covers an area of 381.725 square kilometres (147.385 sq mi) and comprises 0.6% of the state's area.

Farmland covers 64% of Contepec. The mountains on the municipality's eastern border with Temascalcingo are protected as the Altamirano unit of the Monarch Butterfly Biosphere Reserve, a UNESCO World Heritage Site.

Tepuxtepec Dam is located on the Lerma River which flows through the northern and western part of Contepec. Built from 1926 to 1950, the dam and its reservoir are used for hydroelectricity generation, flood control and irrigation.

Contepec's climate is temperate with rain in the summer. Average temperatures in the municipality range between 12 and 18 °C (54–64 °F), and average annual precipitation ranges between 700 and 1,000 millimetres (28–39 in).

Climate data for Tepuxtepec weather station at 19°59′48″N 100°13′49″W, 2370 m above sea level (1981–2010 averages, 1951–2010 extremes)
Month	Jan	Feb	Mar	Apr	May	Jun	Jul	Aug	Sep	Oct	Nov	Dec	Year
Record high °C (°F)	28.8 (83.8)	33.5 (92.3)	35.5 (95.9)	36.7 (98.1)	33.6 (92.5)	31.7 (89.1)	28.8 (83.8)	35.6 (96.1)	28.8 (83.8)	29.4 (84.9)	28.8 (83.8)	28.8 (83.8)	36.7 (98.1)
Mean daily maximum °C (°F)	19.8 (67.6)	21.2 (70.2)	23.9 (75.0)	25.4 (77.7)	25.5 (77.9)	24.0 (75.2)	21.7 (71.1)	21.7 (71.1)	21.2 (70.2)	21.1 (70.0)	20.9 (69.6)	20.4 (68.7)	22.2 (72.0)
Daily mean °C (°F)	12.3 (54.1)	13.3 (55.9)	15.7 (60.3)	17.5 (63.5)	18.2 (64.8)	17.7 (63.9)	16.4 (61.5)	16.3 (61.3)	16.0 (60.8)	15.1 (59.2)	13.8 (56.8)	13.0 (55.4)	15.4 (59.7)
Mean daily minimum °C (°F)	4.8 (40.6)	5.4 (41.7)	7.5 (45.5)	9.7 (49.5)	11.0 (51.8)	11.4 (52.5)	11.1 (52.0)	10.9 (51.6)	10.8 (51.4)	9.1 (48.4)	6.8 (44.2)	5.6 (42.1)	8.7 (47.7)
Record low °C (°F)	−3.3 (26.1)	−2.8 (27.0)	0.0 (32.0)	2.8 (37.0)	5.0 (41.0)	6.1 (43.0)	6.1 (43.0)	6.0 (42.8)	3.0 (37.4)	0.0 (32.0)	0.0 (32.0)	−2.2 (28.0)	−3.3 (26.1)
Average precipitation mm (inches)	17.1 (0.67)	8.3 (0.33)	7.6 (0.30)	19.2 (0.76)	48.6 (1.91)	137.9 (5.43)	183.7 (7.23)	158.8 (6.25)	125.5 (4.94)	50.8 (2.00)	25.0 (0.98)	8.0 (0.31)	790.5 (31.12)
Average precipitation days (≥ 0.1 mm)	2.8	1.7	1.9	4.3	8.5	13.9	17.1	14.4	11.3	6.6	4.4	1.7	88.6
Source: Servicio Meteorológico Nacional

== History ==
The place name Contepec derives from Nahuatl comitl, "pot", and tepetl, "hill". In pre-Hispanic times the area was inhabited by Guamare and Pame indigenous peoples: epidemics caused their extinction in the area by the end of the 16th century. The area was repopulated in the 17th century by Otomi and Mazahua settlers.

In the first half of the 19th century Contepec was part of the municipality of Coroneo in Guanajuato. In 1857 it was separated from Guanajuato and incorporated as a municipality in Michoacán. Between 1935 and 1938 the municipal seat was located at Tepuxtepec. In 1962 the municipality of Epitacio Huerta was separated from Contepec.

== Administration ==
The municipal government comprises a president, a councillor (Spanish: síndico), and seven trustees (regidores), four elected by relative majority and three by proportional representation. The current president of the municipality is Ruben Rodríguez Jiménez.

== Demographics ==
In the 2010 Census, the municipality of Contepec recorded a population of 32,954 inhabitants living in 7723 households. The 2015 Intercensal Survey estimated a population of 34,193 inhabitants in Contepec.

There are 74 localities in the municipality, of which only the municipal seat, also known as Contepec, is classified as urban. It recorded a population of 4184 inhabitants in the 2010 Census.

== Economy ==
The main economic activities in Contepec are agriculture and livestock farming.
