= Epitacio Huerta Municipality =

Epitacio Huerta
- Municipality
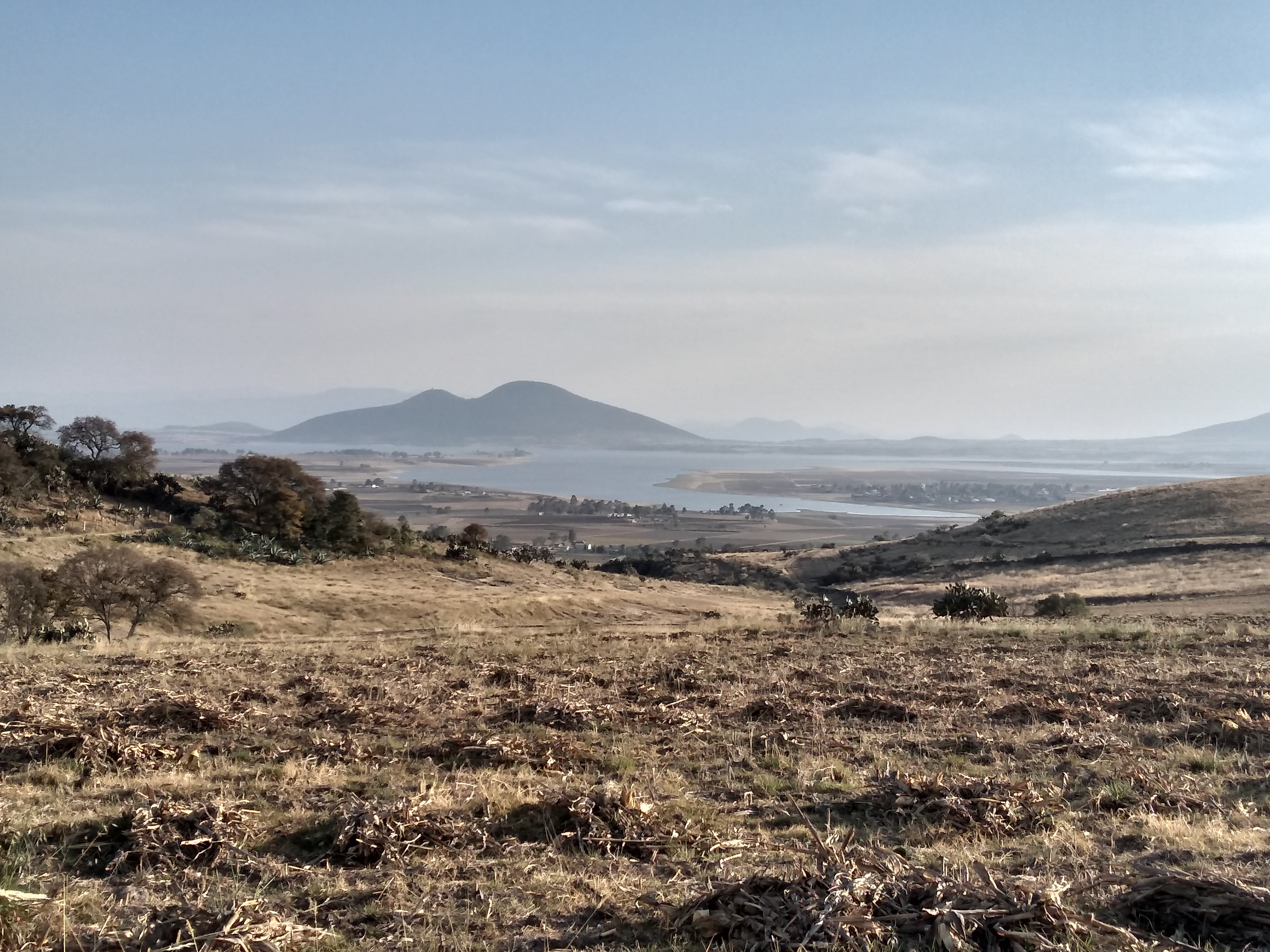
- Tepuxtepec Reservoir on the Lerma River, viewed from Epitacio Huerta

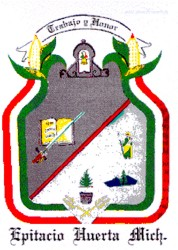
- Coat of arms

- Location in Mexico Epitacio Huerta (Mexico)
- Coordinates: 20°08′05″N 100°17′34″W
- Country: Mexico
- State: Michoacán
- Established: 31 March 1962
- Seat: Epitacio Huerta

Government
  - President: Margarito Fierros

Area
  - Total: 424.839 km^{2} (164.031 sq mi)
- Elevation (of seat): 2,480 m (8,140 ft)

Population (2010 Census)
  - Total: 16,218
  - Estimate (2015 Intercensal Survey): 16,622
  - Density: 38.174/km^{2} (98.871/sq mi)
  - Seat: 1,222
- Time zone: UTC-6 (Central)
- Postal codes: 61000–61018
- Area code: 421
- Website: Official website

Epitacio Huerta is a municipality in the Mexican state of Michoacán. It is located approximately 105 kilometres (65 mi) northeast of the state capital of Morelia. It is named after General Epitacio Huerta, who fought in the Mexican–American War and under Juan Álvarez in the Revolution of Ayutla, and served as governor of Michoacán from 1858 to 1862.

== Geography ==
The municipality of Epitacio Huerta is located in the Trans-Mexican Volcanic Belt in northeast Michoacán at an altitude between 2,300 and 3,100 metres (7,500–10,200 ft). It borders the Queretan municipalities of Huimilpan to the north and Amealco de Bonfil to the northeast, the Michoacanese municipalities of Contepec to the southeast and Maravatío to the southwest, and the Guanajuatean municipalities of Jerécuaro to the southwest and Coroneo to the northwest. The municipality covers an area of 424.839 square kilometres (164.031 sq mi) and comprises 0.72% of the state's area.

As of 2009, farmland covered 59% of Epitacio Huerta's land area, while grasslands covered 22% and forests cover 14%.

=== Hydrography ===
The reservoir of the Tepuxtepec Dam on the Lerma River forms part of Epitacio Huerta's southern border with Contepec. Built from 1926 to 1950, the dam and its reservoir are used for hydroelectricity generation, flood control and irrigation.

=== Climate ===
Epitacio Huerta's climate is temperate with rain in the summer. Average temperatures in the municipality range between 12 and 16 °C (54–61 °F), and average annual precipitation ranges between 700 and 1,000 millimetres (28–39 in).

Climate data for Epitacio Huerta weather station at 20°08′57″N 100°17′50″W, 2503 m above sea level (1981–2010 averages, 1951–2010 extremes)
Month	Jan	Feb	Mar	Apr	May	Jun	Jul	Aug	Sep	Oct	Nov	Dec	Year
Record high °C (°F)	33.0 (91.4)	36.0 (96.8)	38.0 (100.4)	39.0 (102.2)	40.5 (104.9)	39.0 (102.2)	35.0 (95.0)	33.0 (91.4)	32.5 (90.5)	34.5 (94.1)	33.5 (92.3)	33.0 (91.4)	40.5 (104.9)
Mean daily maximum °C (°F)	21.4 (70.5)	23.2 (73.8)	25.9 (78.6)	27.5 (81.5)	27.7 (81.9)	25.4 (77.7)	23.3 (73.9)	23.4 (74.1)	22.7 (72.9)	22.2 (72.0)	21.9 (71.4)	21.5 (70.7)	23.8 (74.8)
Daily mean °C (°F)	12.5 (54.5)	13.9 (57.0)	16.3 (61.3)	18.3 (64.9)	19.0 (66.2)	18.0 (64.4)	16.8 (62.2)	16.7 (62.1)	16.4 (61.5)	15.0 (59.0)	13.7 (56.7)	12.8 (55.0)	15.8 (60.4)
Mean daily minimum °C (°F)	3.7 (38.7)	4.7 (40.5)	6.8 (44.2)	9.0 (48.2)	10.2 (50.4)	10.7 (51.3)	10.3 (50.5)	10.1 (50.2)	10.1 (50.2)	7.8 (46.0)	5.5 (41.9)	4.2 (39.6)	7.8 (46.0)
Record low °C (°F)	−4.5 (23.9)	−4.5 (23.9)	−4.5 (23.9)	3.5 (38.3)	2.0 (35.6)	4.0 (39.2)	5.0 (41.0)	6.0 (42.8)	2.5 (36.5)	−2.0 (28.4)	−1.5 (29.3)	−2.5 (27.5)	−4.5 (23.9)
Average precipitation mm (inches)	10.7 (0.42)	14.9 (0.59)	7.0 (0.28)	21.8 (0.86)	58.1 (2.29)	134.2 (5.28)	197.1 (7.76)	139.5 (5.49)	140.1 (5.52)	58.4 (2.30)	13.5 (0.53)	6.6 (0.26)	801.9 (31.57)
Average rainy days (≥ 1 mm)	2.4	2.3	2.9	4.6	8.2	13.7	17.6	14.4	13.5	7.2	2.8	1.8	91.4
Source: Servicio Meteorológico Nacional

== History ==
At the time of Spanish contact, the area of what is now Epitacio Huerta was a buffer zone between the Purépecha Empire to the west and the Aztec Empire to the east, and was inhabited by the Guamare and Pame peoples. By 1632 the ranch of San José Buena Vista was established in what was then the hacienda of Coroneo. In 1822, San José Buena Vista was itself recorded as a hacienda attached to Tlalpujahua.

In 1962, San José Buena Vista was renamed in honour of General Epitacio Huerta. Effective 31 March 1962, it and the surrounding localities were separated from Contepec to form the municipality of Epitacio Huerta, in accordance with Decree No. 83 of 1 March 1962.

== Administration ==
The municipal government comprises a president, a councillor (Spanish: síndico), and seven trustees (regidores), four elected by relative majority and three by proportional representation. The current president of the municipality is Margarito Fierros.

== Demographics ==
In the 2010 Mexican Census, the municipality of Epitacio Huerta recorded a population of 16,218 inhabitants living in 3992 households. The 2015 Intercensal Survey estimated a population of 16,622 inhabitants in Epitacio Huerta.

There are 82 localities in the municipality, of which only the municipal seat, also known as Epitacio Huerta, is classified as urban. It recorded a population of 1222 inhabitants in the 2010 Census.

== Economy ==
Agriculture is the main economic activity in Epitacio Huerta. Sand and gravel are mined at Palos Altos, located 6 kilometres (3.7 mi) north of the municipal seat.
