= Amealco =

Amealco may refer to:

== Places ==
- Amealco de Bonfil, a town in Querétaro, Mexico
- Amealco de Bonfil Municipality, a municipality in Querétaro, Mexico

== Ships ==
- ARM Amealco, a Mexican Navy research ship previously known as ARM Río Tuxpan and NOAAS Whiting
