= Otomi =

Indigenous ethnic group of Mexico

Otomi Hñähñu, Hñähño, Ñuhu, Ñhato, Ñuhmu
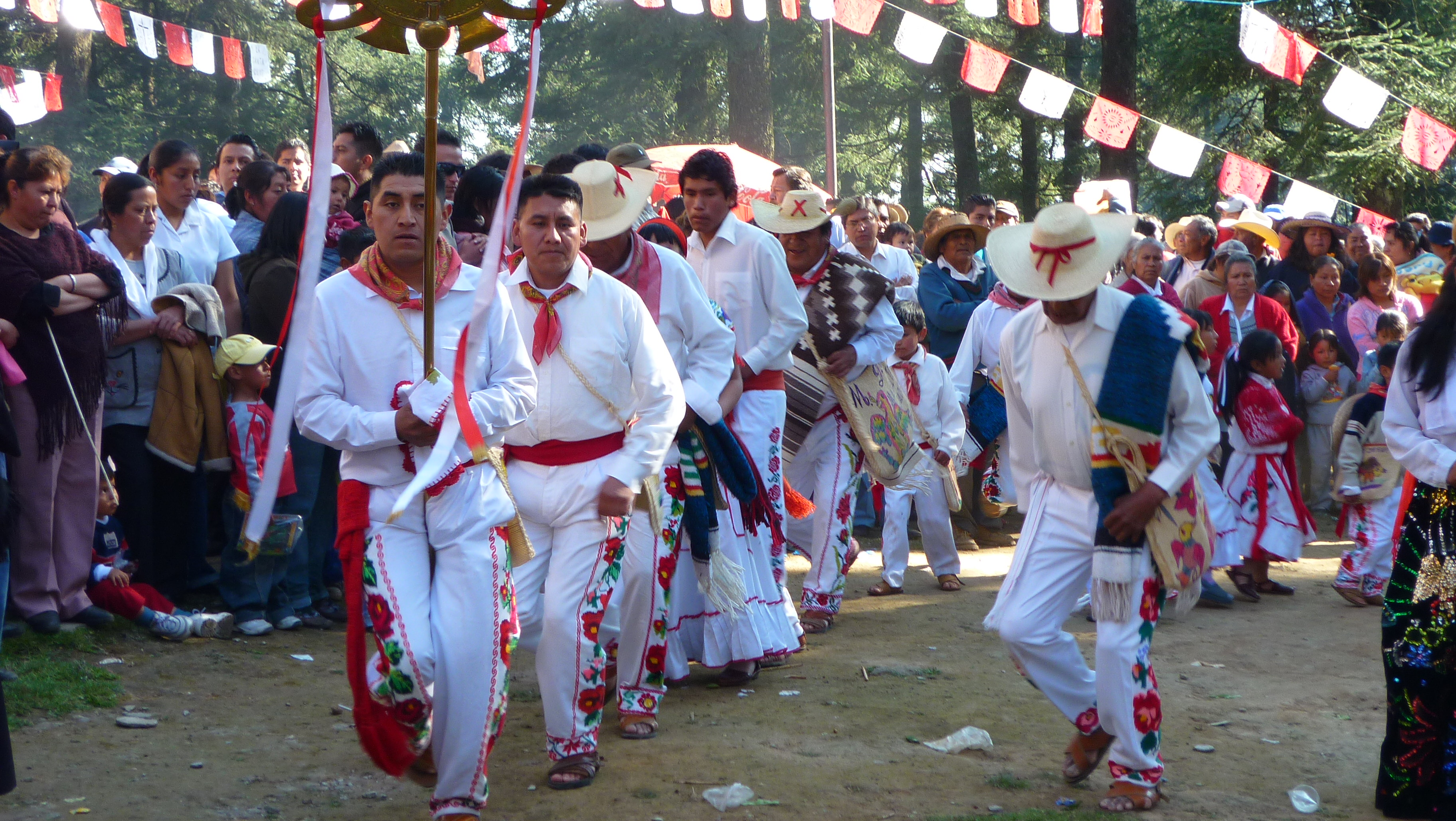
- Otomi dancers from San Jerónimo Acazulco, Mexico state performing the traditional danza de los arrieros

Total population
- 667,000 (2015)

Regions with significant populations
- Mexico: Hidalgo, Edomex, Querétaro, Puebla, Veracruz, San Luis Potosí, Guanajuato, Tlaxcala, Michoacán

Languages
- Primary: Otomi; second: Spanish

Religion
- Roman Catholic

Related ethnic groups
- Mazahua, Pame, Chichimeca Jonaz, Matlatzinca

The Otomi (/ˌoʊtəˈmiː/; Spanish: Otomí [otoˈmi]) are an Indigenous people of Mexico inhabiting the central Mexican Plateau (Altiplano) region.

The Otomi are an Indigenous people of the Americas who inhabit a discontinuous territory in central Mexico. They are linguistically related to the rest of the Otomanguean-speaking peoples, whose ancestors have occupied the Trans-Mexican Volcanic Belt for several thousand years. Currently, the Otomi inhabit a fragmented territory ranging from northern Guanajuato, to eastern Michoacán and southeastern Tlaxcala. However, most of them are concentrated in the states of Hidalgo, Mexico and Querétaro. According to the National Institute of Indigenous Peoples of Mexico, the Otomi ethnic group totaled 667,038 people in the Mexican Republic in 2015, making them the fifth largest Indigenous people in the country. Of these, only a little more than half spoke Otomi. In this regard, the Otomi language presents a high degree of internal diversification, so that speakers of one variety often have difficulty understanding those who speak another language. Hence, the names by which the Otomi call themselves are numerous: ñätho (Toluca Valley), hñähñu (Mezquital Valley), ñäñho (Santiago Mexquititlán in southern Querétaro) and ñ'yühü (Northern highlands of Puebla, Pahuatlán) are some of the names the Otomi use to refer to themselves in their own languages, although it is common that, when speaking in Spanish, they use the native Otomi, originating from Nahuatl.

== Etymology ==
The word Otomi is used to describe the larger Otomi ethnic group and the dialect continuum. From Spanish, the word Otomi has become entrenched in linguistic and anthropological literature. Among linguists, the suggestion has been made to change the academic designation from Otomi to Hñähñú, the endonym used by the Otomi of the Mezquital Valley, but no common endonym exists for all dialects of the language. Like most of the native names used to refer to the Indigenous peoples of Mexico, the term Otomi is not native to the people to which it refers. Otomi is a term of Nahuatl origin that derives from otómitl, which means "one who walks with arrows", although authors such as Wigberto Jimenez Moreno have translated it as "bird arrowman".

== Culture ==
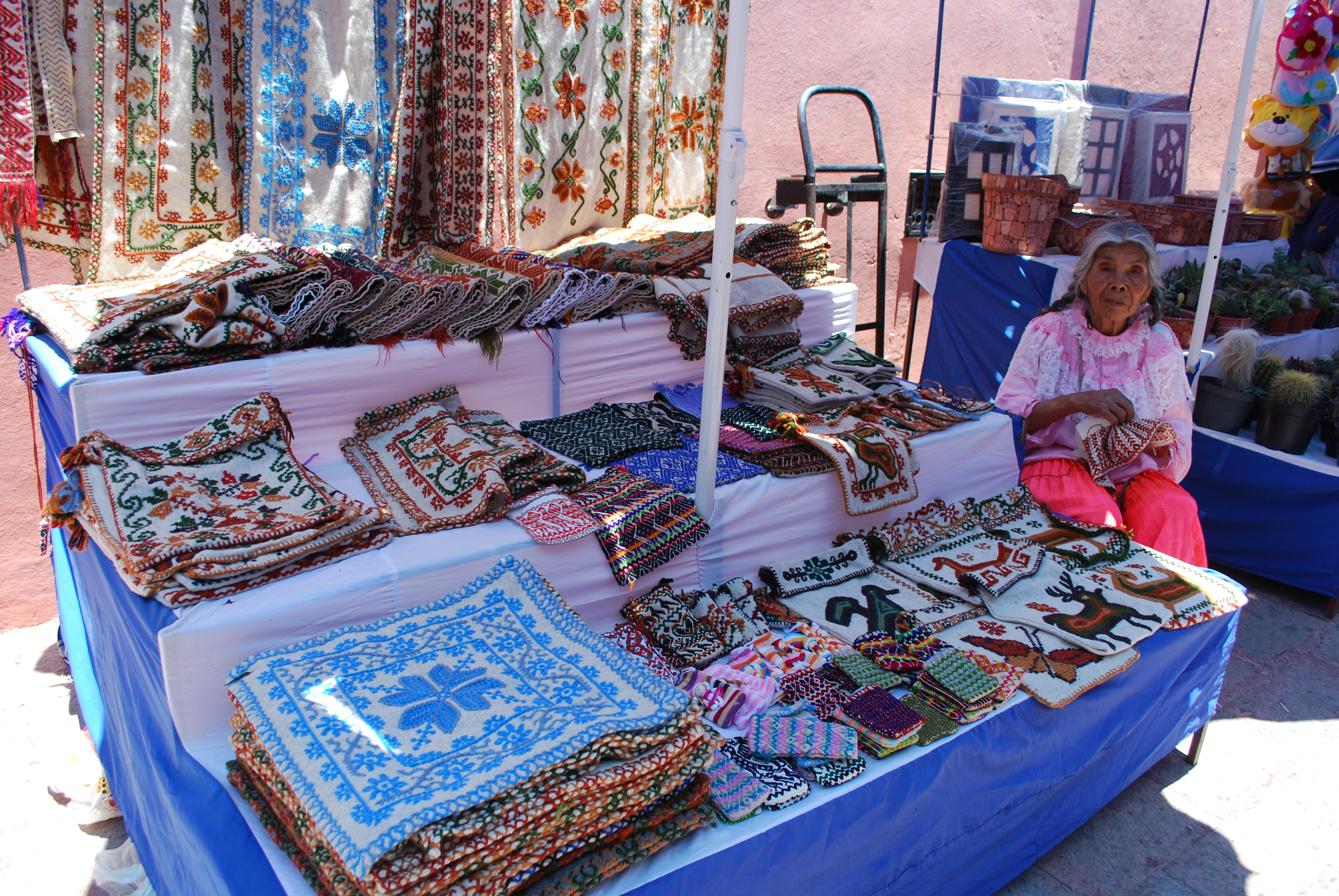
Otomi woman selling traditional Otomi embroidered cloths in Tequisquiapan

Like most sedentary Mesoamerican peoples, the Otomi traditionally subsisted on maize, beans and squash, but the maguey (century plant) was also an important cultigen used for production of alcohol (pulque) and fiber (henequen). Although the Otomi people rarely eat what Westerners would consider a balanced diet, they maintain reasonably good health by eating tortillas, drinking pulque, and eating most fruits available around them. In 1943 to 1944, a report about a nutritional study about the Otomi villages located in the Mezquital Valley of Mexico, recorded that despite the arid climate and land unfit for agriculture without irrigation, the Otomi people chiefly depended on the production of maguey. Maguey (century plant) is used to produce weaving fibers and “pulque”, a fermented unfiltered juice that played an important part in the Otomi's economy and nutrition. However, this practice has begun to decline due to its new large-scale production. The maguey plant was heavily depended upon, even to the point that huts were constructed out of the plant's leaves. During this time, most of the region was vastly underdeveloped and most agriculture was low-yielding. Often densely settled areas would be confused as locations devoid of habitation, as dispersed dwellings are built low and concealed.

The Otomi were blacksmiths and traded valuable metal items with other Indigenous confederations, including the Aztec Triple Alliance. Their metal crafts included ornaments and weaponry, although metal weaponry was not as useful as obsidian weaponry (obsidian being sharper than a modern-day razor, abundant, and light in weight).

=== Spirituality ===
The pre-Hispanic Otomi religion was polytheist, and was closely related to that of the Nahua peoples. Most of the major Nahua deities likely had Otomi equivalents, such as Huitzilopochtli, Ehecatl-Quetzalcoatl (Edähï/Ek’ënmaxi in Otomi respectively), Tlaloc (Hmü’ye), Tlazolteotl (Nopot’ejä), Ometochtli (Noyo jwä), Tlaltecuhtli (Hmühai), Mixcoatl (Et’axäkak’ëngüi), Cihuacoatl, Xipe Totec, Xochiquetzal, Tonacatecuhtli and Tonacacihuatl, Huehuecoyotl, and Mictecacihuatl (Nohmüdü or Mudu). The most important deities overall were the fire-death god Otontecuhtli (also known as Cuecuex and assimilated to Huehueteotl; patronized by the Tepanec), the moon gooddess Zäna (patronized by Xaltocan, as well as Metztitlán and San Bartolo Tutotepec), and Yocippa (probably related to Mixcoatl). There were also the deities Bizamofo "Harvest" and Ojädäpo "Lord of the Mountain". The Otomi calendar bore very close resemblance to that of the Aztecs, most of the names being semantically equivalent.

In modern times, many Otomi populations continue to practice shamanism and hold pre-Hispanic beliefs such as Nagualism.

== Native territory ==
The ethnic territory of the Otomi has historically been central Mexico. Since pre-Hispanic times, the Otomi people have inhabited that region and are considered native peoples of the Mexican highlands. The Otomi may have been found in Mesoamerica at least since the onset of sedentism, or the settling of the nomadic population, which took place in the eighth millennium B.C.E. Occupation of the Otomi in central Mexico then refers to the fact that the linguistic chains between the Otomanguean languages are more or less intact, so that the linguistically closest members of the family are also close in the spatial sense. The first separation of the Otomi group occurred when the eastern languages separated from the western languages. The western branch is composed of two major branches: the Tlapaneco-Manguean-speaking peoples and the Oto-Pame-speaking peoples. Among the latter are the Otomi, settled in the Mexican Neovolcanic Axis along with the rest of the peoples that form part of the same Otomanguean branch: Mazahuas, Matlatzincas, Tlahuicas, Chichimecas.

The Otomi currently occupy a fragmented territory that extends through the states of Mexico, Hidalgo, Querétaro, Guanajuato, Michoacán, Tlaxcala, Puebla and Veracruz. All these states are located in the heart of the Mexican Republic and concentrate most of the country's population. The areas with the highest concentrations of Otomi population are the Mezquital Valley, the Eastern Highlands, the Semi-desert at Peña de Bernal, Querétaro and the north of the state of Mexico. Isolated from these large groups that concentrate around 80% of the total number of members of this Indigenous people are the Otomi of Zitácuaro (Michoacán), those of Tierra Blanca (Guanajuato) and those that still remain in Ixtenco (Tlaxcala). Due to the territory in which they are located, the Otomi live in an intense relationship with large metropolitan areas such as the Metropolitan Zone of Mexico City, the city of Puebla, Toluca and Santiago de Querétaro, places where many of them have had to emigrate in search of better job opportunities.

== History ==
Historiographical texts on the Mesoamerican peoples of the pre-Hispanic era have paid very little attention to the history of the Otomi. Many centuries ago, great cities such as Cuicuilco, Teotihuacan and Tula flourished in the territory occupied by the Otomi at the arrival of the Spaniards. Even in the Aztec Triple Alliance that dominated, the so-called "Mexica Empire", Tlacopan inherited the domains of Azcapotzalco, with a majority Otomi population. However, the Otomi are almost never mentioned as protagonists of pre-Hispanic Mesoamerican history, perhaps because the ethnic complexity of central Mexico at that time does not allow us to distinguish the contributions of the ancient Otomi from those produced by their neighbors. Only in recent years has interest begun to appear in the role played by these people in the development of the cultures living in the Neovolcanic Axis, from the pre-colonial to the conquest.

=== Otomi peoples in pre-Hispanic times ===
By the fifth millennium B.C.E., the Otomi people formed a large group. The diversification of the languages and their geographic expansion from the valley of Tehuacán (currently in the state of Puebla) must have occurred after the domestication of the Mesoamerican agricultural, composed of maize, beans and chili. This is established on the basis that there is a large number of cognates that exist in the Otomi languages in the repertoire of words alluding to agriculture. After the development of emerging agriculture, the proto-Otomanguean legion gave rise to two distinct languages that constitute the antecedents of the present-day eastern and western groups of the Otomi family. Following the linguistic evidence, it seems likely that the Oto-Pames—members of the western branch—arrived in the Valley of Mexico around the fourth millennium B.C.E. and that, contrary to what some authors maintain, they did not migrate from the north but from the south.

Some historians believe that the Otomi were the first inhabitants of the Valley of Mexico, nevertheless, they were later expelled from the valley by the Tepanec in 1418. The Otomi were one of various ethnic groups present within the city of Teotihuacán; one of the largest and most important cities of ancient Mexico. The fall of Teotihuacan is a milestone that signals the end of the Classic Period in Mesoamerica. Changes in political networks at the Mesoamerican level, disputes between small rival states and population movements resulting from prolonged droughts in northern Mesoamerica facilitated the arrival of new settlers in central Mexico. Around this time, large Nahuatl-speaking groups arrived and began to displace the Otomi to the east. They then arrived in the Eastern Highlands and some areas of the Puebla-Tlaxcala valley. In the following centuries, large states developed in the Otomi territory, led by the Nahua peoples. Around the 9th century, the Toltecs turned Tula (Mähñem'ì in Otomi) into one of the main cities of Mesoamerica. This city constructed a large part of the population of the Mezquital Valley, although many of them continued to live to the south and east, in the state of Mexico and the Eastern Highlands.

Around the year 1100 AD, Otomi-speaking peoples formed their capital city-state, Xaltocan. Xaltocan soon acquired power—enough power to demand tribute from nearby communities up until its subjugation. Thereafter, the Otomi kingdom was conquered during the 14th century by the Mexica and its alliances. The Otomi people then were subject to pay a tribute to the Aztec Triple Alliance as their empire grew; subsequently, Otomi people resettled in lands to the east and south of their former territory. While some Otomi resettled elsewhere, other Otomi still resided near current-day Mexico City, but most settled in areas near the Mezquital Valley in Hidalgo, the highlands of Puebla, areas between Tetzcoco and Tulancingo, and as far as Colima and Jalisco.

=== Conquest ===
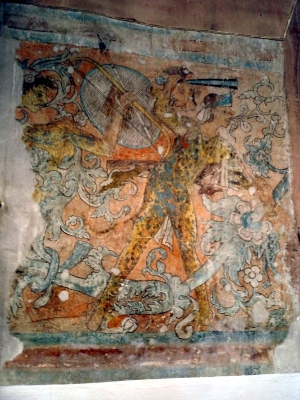
Mural Iglesia Church of San Miguel Arcángel, Ixmiquilpan, Hidalgo

A sizable portion of the Otomi resided in the state of Tlaxcala. Although there are reports that Spanish Conquistador Hernán Cortés originally attacked and "annihilated the Otomis at Tecoac, who were destroyed completely", they eventually joined forces with him when he fought the Aztec Triple-Alliance, eventually defeating it. This allowed the Ixtenco Otomi or (Yųhmų) to once again expand. They founded the City of Querétaro and settled in many towns in the state now known as Guanajuato. The Otomi of Mezquital or (Hñähñu) maintained a state of war upon the Spanish and their Ixtenco otomi allies with records indicating that the hñähñu (Otomi of Mezquital) resisted assimilation and maintained nomadic raiding parties that attacked any Spanish settlement within Hidalgo maintaining a state of war that lasted until the first silver mines were opened. The Ixtenco Otomi allegiance with the Spanish led to many converting to Roman Catholicism, but they also held onto their ancient customs. While being colonized, the Ixtenco Otomi language was dispersed to various other states such as Guanajuato, Querétaro, that included the states of Puebla, Veracruz, with Michoacán and Tlaxcala, where most remained farmers. In the Mezquital Valley a traditional homeland to the Otomi, the terrain was not well suited for farming as the land was dry and many Otomi people hired each other as laborers and relied heavily on the maguey-based drink, pulque. Originally, the Spanish banned the drink but soon attempted to manage a business through its production which led to the Otomi people solely using the drink for their own consumption.

=== Colonial period ===
The arrival of the Spanish in Mesoamerica meant the subjugation of the Indigenous peoples to the dominion of the newcomers. By the 1530s, all the Otomi communities of the Mezquital Valley and the Barranca de Meztitlán had been divided into encomiendas. Subsequently, when Spanish legislation was modified, the so-called Indian republics appeared, systems of political organization that allowed a certain autonomy of the Otomi communities with respect to the Hispanic-mestizo populations. The creation of these republics, the strengthening of the Indigenous cabildos (council) and the recognition of the possession of communal lands by the Spanish state were elements that allowed the Otomi to preserve their language and, to a certain extent, their Indigenous culture. However, especially with regard to land possession, the Indigenous communities suffered dispossession throughout the three centuries of Spanish colonization.

At the same time that the Spaniards were occupying the ancient Otomi settlements, as is the case of the present-day city of Salamanca (Guanajuato), founded in the Otomi settlement of Xidóo ("Place of tepetates)") in 1603 by decree of Gaspar de Zúñiga y Acevedo, viceroy of New Spain. Some Otomi families were forced to accompany the Spaniards in the conquest of the northern territories of Mesoamerica, occupied by the warlike Arido-American peoples. The Otomi were colonizers who settled in cities such as San Miguel el Grande, Oaxaca and other cities of El Bajio. In fact, the colonization process of this territory was essentially the work of the Otomi, with the lordship of Xilotepec as the spearhead. In El Bajío, the Otomí served as a bridge for the sedentism, or the settling of the nomadic population and Christianization of the nomadic peoples, who ended up being assimilated or exterminated by force. The importance of El Bajío in the economy of New Spain turned it into a scenario where different ethnic groups later converged, including the Tlaxcalan migrants, the Purepecha and the Spanish, who would finally end up overcoming all the Indigenous groups that supported them in the conquest of this territory that had been the habitat of numerous peoples classified as Chichimeca. However, until the nineteenth century, the Otomi population in El Bajío was still a major component, and some of their descendants remain in municipalities such as Tierra Blanca, San José Iturbide and San Miguel de Allende. Otomí population movements continued throughout the colonial era. For example, in San Luis Potosí, a total of 35 Otomi families were forcibly taken to occupy the periphery of the city and defend it from attacks by the nomadic people of the region in 1711. In several places, the Otomi population was decimated not only by forced or consensual migrations, but also by the constant epidemics suffered by the Mesoamerican tribes after the Conquest. Numerous communities were wiped out between the sixteenth and eighteenth centuries due to disease.

=== Nineteenth and twentieth centuries ===
Otomi flag

During Mexico's War of Independence, the Otomi sided with the rebellion as they wanted their land back that was taken from them under the encomienda system.

Around 1940–1950, government agencies had promised to assist the Indigenous people by helping them gain access to better education and economic advancements but failed to do so. In turn, the people continued to farm and work as laborers within their minor subsistence economy within a larger capitalistic economy where the Indigenous people was able to be exploited by those who are in control of the economy. Since gaining independence, the Mexican government has adopted an adoring attitude towards the pre-Hispanic history and works of the Aztecs and Mayans; meanwhile, it has disregarded the living Indigenous people, such as the Otomi who are depicted without the same prestige. Until recently, the Otomi culture and people were not given much attention or focus until recent anthropologist began investigating their ancient way of life. As a result, the Mexican government has gone as far declaring themselves a pluricultural nation that serves to help many of its Indigenous populations, like the Otomi. However, this has not been the case with scarce evidence proving that anything is done to truly help them. Although many of the current descendants of the Otomi have begun to immigrate to other region, there is still a hint of their ancient culture present today. In certain parts of Mexico, such as Guanajuato and Hidalgo, prayer songs in Otomi are heard and elders share tales the youth who understand their native language. Despite this, very little attention has been placed on the Otomi culture, especially through education means where very little is discussed about any Indigenous groups. Because of this, many Otomi descendants know very little about their own culture's history.

== Language ==
An Otomi speaker, recorded in Peru

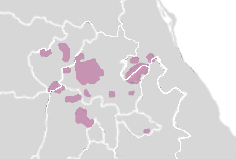
Otomi-speaking areas in Mexico

The Otomi languages belong to the Oto-Pamean family (which also includes Chichimeca Jonaz, Mazahua, Pame, Ocuilteco, and Matlatzinca). Oto-Pamean in turn is a branch of the wider Oto-Manguean family (which also includes the Amuzgo language and the Chinantecan, Mixtecan, Popolocan, Tlapanecan, and Zapotecan families). Oto-Manguean is one of the oldest and most diverse in the Mesoamerican area. One of the more than one hundred Otomanguean languages that survive today, the Otomi languages relate closely to the Mazahua language, also spoken in the northwest and west of the state of Mexico. Some glottochronological analyses applied to Otomi languages indicate that they split from Mazahua around the 8th century CE. Since then, Otomi has fragmented into the languages known today.

Although Otomi is often referred to as a single language, it is in reality a complex of multiple languages, the number of which varies according to the sources consulted. According to the Ethnologue of the Summer Institute of Linguistics and the Catalog of Indigenous Languages of the National Institute of Indigenous Languages (Inali) of Mexico, there are nine varieties of Otomi. David Charles Wright Carr proposes that there are four Otomi languages. Some of these varieties are not mutually intelligible.

According to the National Commission for the Development of Indigenous Peoples of Mexico (CDI), only 50.6% of the Otomi population speaks their native language. In 1995, this proportion corresponded to a total of 327,319 speakers of Otomi languages in the entire Mexican Republic. The above calculation corresponds to a CDI estimate that is intended to include Otomi-speaking children under the age of five, who are not included in Mexican population counts. According to the 1995 First Population Count, Otomi speakers over the age of five totaled 283,263 individuals, which represents a loss of 22,927 speakers compared to the 1980 Population and Housing Census, when 306,190 speakers of Otomi languages were recorded.

The population of speakers of Otomi languages has declined in recent years. To some extent, this reduction of Otomi speakers is due to migration from their communities of origin and the urbanization of their ethnic territory, which imposes on them the need to coexist with an exclusively Spanish-speaking population for the most part. The contraction of the Otomi linguistic community is also the result of the Castilianization processes to which all the Indigenous peoples of Mexico have been subjected. The Castilianization of Indigenous people in Mexico has long been understood as a subtractive process, that is, one that implies the renunciation of the use of the mother tongue in order to obtain linguistic competence in the Spanish language. The Castilianization of Indigenous people was presented as an alternative to integrate Indigenous people into the Mexican national culture and to improve their living conditions. However, Indigenous education programs in the Spanish language have been discredited by critics because they imply, on the one hand, the loss of the native language and, on the other hand, have not served to improve the quality of life of Indigenous communities.

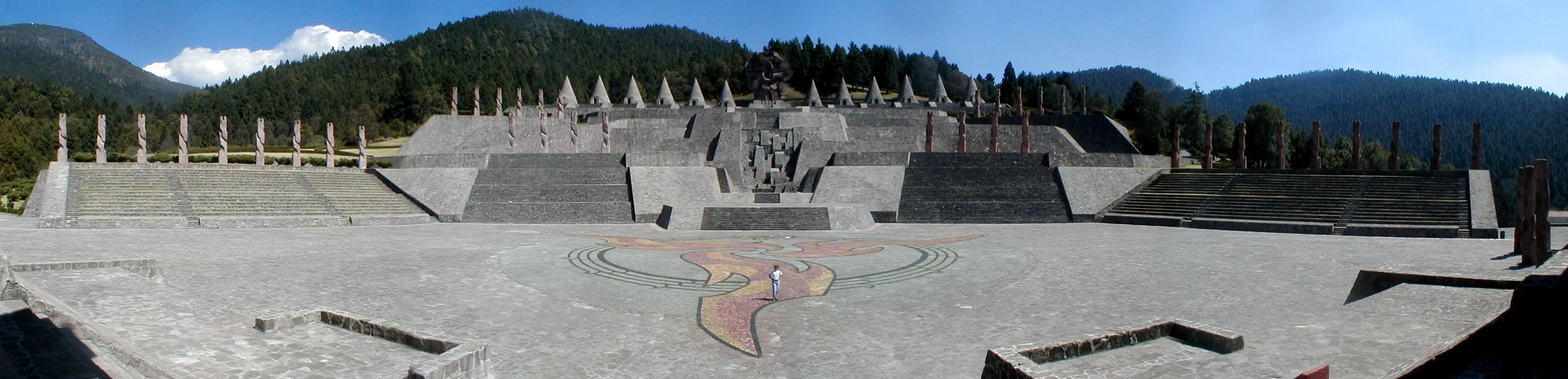
Main stage of the Otomi Ceremonial Center (Otomi Cultural Center) in Temoaya, Mexico state

== Notable people ==
- Xiye Bastida, environmentalist
- Martina García Cruz, artisan
- Macedonia Blas Flores, human rights activist
- Macuilxochitzin, Aztec poet
- José Luis Romo Martín, painter
- Tomás Mejía, general
- Fortunato Moreno Reinoso, artisan
- Adela Calva Reyes, writer
- Kevin Álvarez (footballer, born 1999)
- Juventino Rosas, composer Sobre las Olas, violinist

== See also ==
- Otomi (military), an Aztec military order named after, if not composed of, Otomis
- Licence to Kill, 1989 James Bond movie shows the Centro Cultural Otomi.
- Macedonia Blas Flores, a candidate for the Nobel Peace Prize in 2005.
- Museo de la Cultura Hñähñu y Centro Cultural del Valle del Mezquital
- Montezuma's Daughter, a novel depicting the Spanish conquest of Mexico in which the capital city of the Otomi is called Pine City. The main female character of the novel, the daughter of emperor Montezuma, is of Otomi descent.
