= Matlatzinca =

Matlatzinca or Ocuiltec may refer to:

- Matlatzinca people, an ethnic group of Mexico
- Matlatzinca languages, a group of Oto-Manguean languages
