= Ricardo Pozas Arciniega =

Mexican anthropologist

Ricardo Pozas Arciniega (May 4, 1912, Amealco de Bonfil, Querétaro – January 19, 1994, Mexico City) was a distinguished Mexican anthropologist, scientific investigator and indigenista. He wrote the classic anthropological works Juan Pérez Jolote, biografía de un tzotzil and Los mazatecos y Chamula, un pueblo indio de los altos de Chiapas.

== Works ==
- Juan Pérez Jolote, biografía de un tzotzil. Mexico: Fondo de Cultura Económica, 1952.
- El desarrollo de la comunidad : técnicas de investigación social. Mexico: Universidad Nacional Autónoma de México, 1961.
- Los mazatecos y Chamula, un pueblo indio de los altos de Chiapas. Mexico: Fondo de Cultura Económica.
- "Etnografía de los mazatecos", in Revista Mexicana de Estudios Antropológicos, v. XVI. Sociedad Mexicana de Antropología, 1960.
- Chamula. Mexico: Instituto Nacional Indigenista, 1977. ISBN 968-822-076-0
- La Política Indigenista en México, with Gonzalo Aguirre Beltrán. Mexico: Instituto Nacional Indigenista, 1981. ISBN 968-822-023-X
- Los Indios en las Clases Sociales de México, with Isabel Horcasitas de Pozas. Mexico: Siglo XXI, 1985. ISBN 968-23-0067-3
- Yis ma̱ i shö (yo voy a decir), with Enrique Margery Peña (editor) and Francisco Amighetti (illustrator). Costa Rica: Ministerio de Educación Pública, 1996 (posthumous). ISBN 9977-60-122-4
