= Matlatzinca language =

Endangered Oto-Manguean language of Mexico

Matlatzinca
- San Francisco Matlatzinca
- fot’una
- Native to: Mexico
- Region: State of Mexico (San Francisco Oxtotilpan)
- Ethnicity: Matlatzinca
- Native speakers: 1,245 (2020 INEGI)^{[1]} 2,020 (SE 2020)
- Language family: Oto-Manguean^{[2]}: Western Oto-Manguean; Oto-Pame-Chinantecan; Oto-Pamean; Matlatzincan-Ocuilteco; Matlatzinca

Official status
- Official language in: Mexico
- Regulated by: Secretariat of Public Education (SEP)

Language codes
- ISO 639-3: mat
- Glottolog: sanf1262
- ELP: Matlatzinca
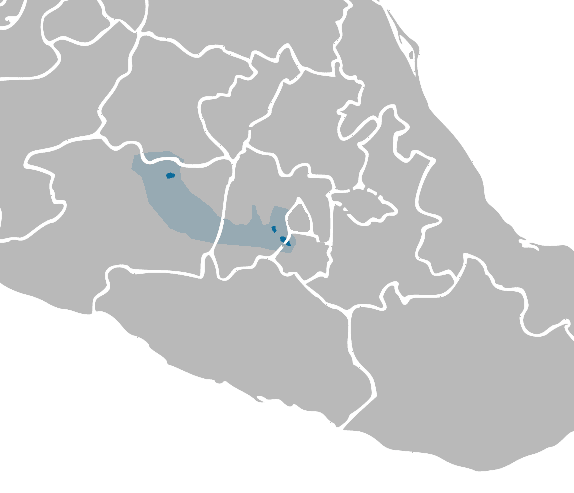
- Reach of the Matlatzinca languages at the start of the 20th century, and their probable expansion during the 16th century

Matlatzinca is an endangered Oto-Manguean language spoken in San Francisco Oxtotilpan, State of Mexico. Natively the language is called bot'una [βotʔuna] or fot'una /mbot’una/. Matlatzinca is related to the Ocuiltec language and the two form the Matlatzincan branch. A third related language, Pirinda, went extinct in 1936 and may have been a variety of Matlatzinca. The name "Pirinda" has been described as an ethnonym and synonymous with Matlatzinca, though the people described as Pirinda were centered in Charo, Michoacán. "Matlatzinco" was the Nahuatl name for the Toluca valley, and may have originated from the word matlatl "net" in reference to the native's fishing nets or net-making. "Pirinda" is more obscure and has been attributed to either the Matlatzinca or Purépecha languages, meaning "in the middle," in reference to their location in the Purépecha Empire.

In addition the language is also known as these names: Botuna, botuná, k’a futuna, futuna, maklasinca, maklatzinca, matéame, matlaltzinga, matlatzinca, matlatzinca de San Francisco de los Ranchos, and matlazinca. There's also the marginal names: Fot una, matazintla, matlame.

== History ==
The first group or groups of Matlatzincas likely settled in the Toluca Valley around the 12th century. After other groups began to settle around and within it, the Matlatzinca territory became an important hub of economic activity. The economic activity prompted the Nahuatl language to become the dominant language in the area. At this point, Matlatzinca communities began losing their language.^{[5]}

Since the Spanish conquest of the Aztec Empire, the group has lost much of their territory. As Franciscan orders began arriving in the territory and evangelizing to the natives, missionaries were forced to learn the languages and create grammars. In 1565 before epidemics ravaged the native populations of New Spain, it was estimated that there were perhaps 180,000 people who spoke Matlatzinca.^{[5]}

== Status ==
INEGI recorded 1,245 Matlatzinca speakers country-wide in 2020, while the Secretariat of the Economy recorded 2,020 speakers in the same year within the municipality of Temascaltepec, which includes San Francisco Oxtotilpan.

There are fewer and fewer speakers of Matlatzinca. Even in a majority bilingual population, the use of Spanish is becoming increasingly dominant. The language is only spoken among the older generation and very few young people, and because Spanish is so necessary to know outside of the community, it has begun to replace the Matlatzinca language. Even though Matlatzinca is a moribund language, it is recognized as an official language of Mexico along with Spanish and dozens of other native languages. At any one time, about half the population is in the village of San Francisco Oxtotilpan and half away in Mexico City.

There is little hope that the language will persist even though younger speakers exist, but there are revitalization efforts that focus on documenting recorded audio-visual interviews, Spanish-translated materials, transcriptions, glosses, and annotated materials. This database was put together in 2019 by Enrique L. Palancar and Leonardo Carranza. Though it is not supposed to be a revitalization project exactly, the database provides materials to aid in future revitalization efforts.^{[6]}

== Phonology ==
=== Consonants ===
There are 16 phonemes in the consonant inventory of San Francisco Matlatzinca.^{[3]} In some transcriptions, the IPA symbol is replaced with the segments seen in the brackets.

	Labial	Alveolar	Post- alveolar	Palatal	Velar		Glottal
	Labial	Alveolar	Post- alveolar	Palatal	nor.	lab.	Glottal
Plosive	p	t			k ⟨k⟩	kʷ ⟨kw⟩	ʔ ⟨'⟩
Affricate			t͡ʃ ⟨ch⟩				
Fricative	β ⟨b⟩	s	ʃ ⟨x⟩				h
Nasal	m	n					
Tap		ɾ					
Lateral		l					
Approximant				j ⟨y⟩		w	

=== Vowels ===
There are 7 vowel phonemes in San Francisco Matlatzinca.^{[7]}

	Front	Central	Back
Close	i	ɨ	u
Mid	e	ə ⟨ä⟩	o
Open		ɑ	

There are no glides inherent to these vowels, so it's as if they resemble Spanish vowels. There is the tendency to drop word-final vowels if it occurs after a voiceless stop or affricate.^{[7]} For example, /i/ may get left off the end of a word if it is unstressed and appears after a voiceless consonant.^{[7]}

=== Syllable structure ===
Every syllable is structured around one of the vowels listed. Neither an onset or a coda is required of a syllable generally, though there are restrictions on whether an onset or coda is necessary depending on placement of the syllable within the word.

For example, the first syllable of a word may begin with a vowel or a consonant. In this case, the syllabic vowel can be preceded with a consonant or not or may be followed by a consonant or not. The possibilities for word-initials can be summed up in these possible syllables: V-, CV-, VC-, CVC-.

Word-final syllables must always have an onset consisting of one consonant or a two-consonant cluster: -CV or -CCV. This also means that all words will end in a syllabic vowel, never a consonant

Syllables found in the middle of words will always have an onset of either one consonant or a two-consonant cluster. The syllable can be open, meaning there is no coda of consonants after the syllabic vowel, or closed with consonants on both sides. However, if the onset contains a cluster, then the vowel cannot be closed. Additionally, consonant clusters have a maximum of two consonants and only occur in onsets, never codas, of the syllable. The possibilities for these syllables found in the middle of words can be summed up in these possible syllables: -CV-, -CVC-, -CCV.

Examples of these structures are t'etəʃna "my clothing" and inʃtəti "a sheep".^{[7]}

=== Stress ===
There are no phonemes that have specific prosodic qualities ascribed to them, but there are patterns to be found nonetheless. Andrews and Shell (1945) notice that there seems to be a pattern of a stress on alternating syllables, as seen in the word 'meka'ka. Frequently, the vowels in these stressed syllables will become lengthened. They also notice that this pattern of alternating stresses does not continue across phrases, but only within individual words, noting its usefulness for determining word boundaries.^{[7]}

However, pitch and tone do hold lexical, morphological, and syntactic importance. Tone sandhi occurs in Matlatzinca, which is a pitch-accent language, just as it does in many Oto-Manguean languages.

Matlatzinca has a high and a low tone, but as four phonetically distinct tones. The high and low tones are often interpreted as a pattern of stress and lack of stress, though stresses can occur both on high and low tones. Tonal changes often occur when Matlatzinca combines two or more words, such as tahnə:bi "I danced" with a low tone on the middle syllable becoming tahnə:bi bək'i "I danced here" with the same syllable converting to a high tone add the bi becoming a low tone. Some other tendencies are that the tone of the syllable will be drawn towards the one that follows it, such as in tuko:ti mbaʔni "She shut the house". When the word ends with a low tone before a high tone, the high tone tends to be dropped to a mid tone. If the end of the word ends in a low tone, the last syllable may drop to a phonetic sub-low tone. Finally, a falling glide may occur at the final syllable of a word, such as in ^{[8]}

=== Phonological processes ===
Here are examples of only some of the phonological processes that occur in Matlatzinca:

- Consonants in Matlatzinca undergo debuccalization such as with [kʰ, pʰ, mʰ] or will be accompanied by a glottal stop [ʔ] on either side of the consonant. This can be seen in ɾutʰan "bird".
- The bilabial phonemes /p, β, m/ will become labialized and take on the approximant /w/ when they come before the central vowels /ɨ, ə/ becoming the allophones [pʷ, βʷ, mʷ], such as in pä'chi, transcribed phonetically as ['pʷəʔtʃi].
- The voiced alveolar nasal /n/ is apico-alveolar normally, but becomes velarized [ŋ] before a velar consonant (ink′aró [ʔiŋkʔaro]), palatalized [ɲ] before a palatal consonant (inyá [ʔiɲa]), and voiceless [n̥] when alongside /h/ (nínhupí [′nin̥u′pi]).
- The phoneme /s/ becomes an affricate resembling [t͡s] when it is accompanied by a glottal stop as in s′íná, transcribed as [′tsʔina].
- The phoneme /ɾ/ will become a trill [r] when it accompanies /h/, as in rhántá. It becomes a dental retroflex stop [ɖ] after a nasal consonant, as in s′énru.
- The phoneme /β/ becomes labiodental [f] when in combination with /h/, becomes a stop [b] when accompanied by a nasal consonant, and is a fricative [β] everywhere else.
- The phonemes /j, l, w, m, n/ all become voiceless [j̊, l̥, w̥, m̥, n̥] when in groups with /h/.
- The consonants /k, t͡ʃ, s/ become voiced [ɡ, d͡ʒ, z] when in groups of other consonants.

== Morphology ==
=== Prefixes and Suffixes ===
==== Nouns ====
The stem frequently takes a few different forms such as CV, CVC, CVV, CVVC, and CVʰCVC.^{[9]} The only obligatory prefixes that are always attached to the stem are for the number and gender of the possessor. For example, the marked gender plural is used in ʔin-ne-tʰami, meaning "coin", where ʔin- is the determiner and -ne is the plural marked gender. When there is an indefinite possessor, the suffix -ta is used, such as in ʔine-moo-ta meaning "someone′s feet".

Prefixes for number and gender
	Marked gender	Unmarked gender
Singular	ø-	ni-
Dual	te-	
Plural	ne-	

An example of possessive prefixes is in the word ʔim-bot′o-no, meaning "our head". The possessive prefix, which in this case is ø for the singular marked gender, will come after the number and gender prefixes. Given that the prefixes for plural 2nd and 3rd person are the same, tone is often used to distinguish between the two.

Prefixes for possessives
	Singular	Dual	Plural
1st Person	tʰe- or t′o- (inherently relational)	bet′o-	bot′o-
2nd Person			ro-
3rd Person	ni- (niri-)		ro- (rori)

Matlatzinca also has appreciative prefixes that preceded the stem but come after the prefixes for the number/gender and possessive. Here are some examples:

- ba meaning "long"
- maa- and tee- both meaning "big"
- t′o and tʰe both meaning "small"

==== Verbs ====
The verb system is generally aligned with a nominative-accusative system. Verb stems often take the forms of either CVC, CVV, CVVC, or CVʰVC.^{[9]} Verbs include affixes for time-aspect-mode, voice, and the number of subject and object arguments. The affix for time-aspect-mode will precede the stem of the word. This can be seen in the word ki-ro-nnəʰə ne-ʃuwi, meaning "the women dance", where ron- indicates the third person accusative.

Prefixes for verb morphemes
	Singular	Dual	Plural
1st Person	to-	kʷen-	kʷʰen-
2nd Person		t͡ʃen-	
3rd Person	ø-		ron-

When speaking about an object, the suffix ki- is used to mark the first person singular, such as in ki ron-to-seti-ki, and ø is used to mark third person singular, such as in ki tu-ʔuri-ø.

As seen in both the previous examples, the morpheme ki is used in most verb constructions, but its meaning and function is not very clear. It appears with morphemes concerning time-aspect-mode, generally preceding the verb, but it does not come before determinant phrases, adjectives, adverbs, or prepositions.

=== Allomorphy ===
Motijo proposes that the morpheme ʔin is a determiner that indicates a noun, as seen in the word ʔimbaani, meaning "house". It does not form part of the noun, and adjectives can come between that and the noun. wee is another determiner that is mutually exclusive of ʔin, though it is very similar. wee is mostly used in noun phrases where human nouns are used, implicating a social function, such as in weɾiwi (wee ø-ɾiw), meaning "son". ʔin is used in all the other cases. ʔin also appears regardless of the number of the noun, but wee does not appear in nouns that are dual or plural. Furthermore, ʔin can take on different allomorphs such as [ʔiN], [ʔi], or [N]. The final consonant /n/ may be realized as [n], [ɲ], [ŋ], or [m] as seen in ʔimbot′o xiita or ʔiɲchä. The final consonant may also fall off, and the determiner becomes ʔi.^{[9]}

== Syntax ==
Based on data provided by Escalante and Hernández,^{[3]} Matlatzinca utilizes an SVO word order just as English does. For example,

- wetowá'a ku'íwi meaning, "the boy is sleeping" has a subject wetowá'a for "the boy" preceding a verb ku'íwi for "sleeping" in the present tense.
- kach'í iht'ahki imhéwi meaning, "you always ask me for tortillas" demonstrates a more complex sentence structure containing a subject, verb, and object.
  - kach'í is the subject, translating to the 2nd person singular subject "you".
  - iht'ahki is the verb (though containing many affixes). Within the verb is communicated the subject of the verb (ih), that the verb is a transitive verb (-tu), the verb stem itself (-aati), and finally the 1st person singular indirect object (-ki).
  - imhéwi is the object of the phrase, translating to "tortillas". The prefix im- denotes a definite article attached to the noun object.

However, if there is not a direct object present, the sentence can take the order VS or SV.^{[9]} For example,

- A SV ordering may look like daʰa-kikʷentaʰati meaning, "we laugh", where daʰa is the first person plural subject and kʷentaʰati is the verb.
- A VS ordering may look like kiʔaach-nit′osibi meaning, "my teeth left/grew in", where ki marks the first person singular for the verb, ʔaach is the verb, and nit′osibi is the subject for "teeth".

Another common sentence structure is VO.

- A VO ordering may look like kitohaachi-yeesaa meaning, "I cut the branch of the tree", where tohaachi is the verb and yeesaa is the noun/object.

Within the noun phrase, there are certain ordering rules:^{[3]}

- The article will always come before the noun, such as in imbáani meaning "house", where the prefix im- is the definite singular article.
- An adjective will always come before the noun in a noun phrase, such as in inch'əmi meaning "the red chili", where -ch'ə designates the chili as red.
- When the noun is present in a certain number, then the number denotation will always come after the noun, such as in the phrase síní tenówewi meaning, "two dogs". The second word tenówewi indicates that there is two of the dogs.
- Indication of a possessive will come before the noun, such as in wetheriwí meaning "my son", where the affix -the- means "my".

=== Case Marking ===
Matlatzinca mostly follows the nominative-accusative system. There is also a small class of verbs that follow an active-stative alignment, but there is not enough in the existing corpus to infer the general difference for when each case is used.^{[9]} Examples of different case markings can be seen in the Morphology section above.

== Sample Text ==
Article 1 of the Universal Declaration of Human Rights:

Matlatzinca: Be’ mëni 1: Te’sokhowi khwen khana nïta ‘ixta tá’ bukhakhowi mu te’sokhowi, mu khwen khana pëya ‘ixta khwen pëti pu khwen chhori, pu rúkhwen té thiya mu te’sokhowi pi ‘ bot’u nunihani.

English: Article 1: All human beings are born free and equal in dignity and rights. They are endowed with reason and conscience and should act towards one another in a spirit of brotherhood.

== Notes ==
1. Lenguas indígenas y hablantes de 3 años y más, 2020 INEGI. Censo de Población y Vivienda 2020.
2.Ethnologue.
3. Escalante, R. Hernández, & Hernández, M. (1999). Matlatzinca de San Francisco Oxtotilpan, Estado de México (Vol. 23). El Colegio de México.
4. Sabino Nava, Rocío. "¿Somos Ocuiltecos, Atzincas, Tlahuicas o Pjiekakjo?" Estudios de Cultura Otopame 7, no. 1.
5. Instituto Nacional de los Pueblos Indígenas. Gobierno de México. Retrieved 30 January 2023.
6. Palancar, Enrique L. & Leonardo Carranza. 2019. Endangered Languages Archive.
7. Andrews, Henrietta; Shell, Olive A. (1945). A Tentative Statement of Matlatzinca Phonemes and their Distribution. SIL International.
8. Andrews, Henrietta (1946). "Observations on Tonal Phenomena in Matlatzinca".
9. Montijo, Etna Teresita Pascacio (December 2017). El vocabulario Matlatzinca de Fray Andrés de Castro: estudio filológico, características fonológicas y análisis morfológico de la flexión nominal y verbal. Universidad Nacional Autónoma de Mexico.
