= Church of San Miguel Arcángel =

Church in Mexico

Coordinates: 20°28′57″N 99°13′07″W

The Church of San Miguel Arcángel
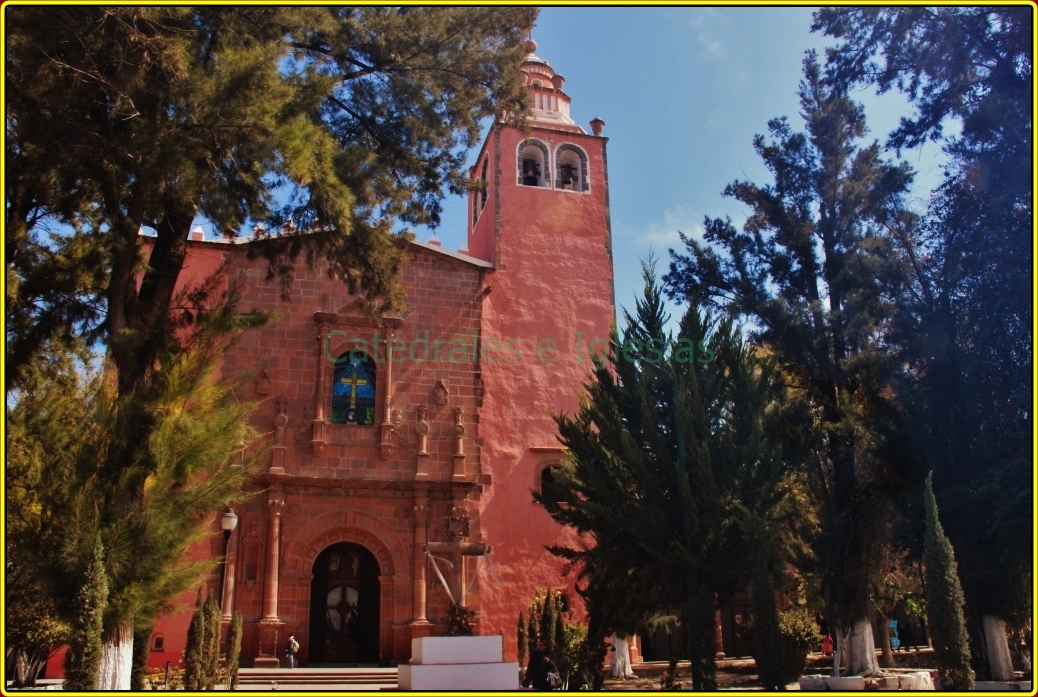
- Main façade of the Church of San Miguel Arcángel
- Location: Ixmiquilpan, Hidalgo (Mexico)
- Denomination: Catholic Church
- Consecrated: c. 1550
- Titular saint: Saint Michael the Archangel

The Church of San Miguel Arcángel is a Roman Catholic church located in the town of Ixmiquilpan, Hidalgo, Mexico. Built in the 16th century, the church is renowned for its intricate murals depicting religious and secular themes, as well as its fusion of European and Indigenous architectural styles. This church and its artwork are a foundational example of the cultural and religious syncretism present in Indigenous society post-conquest with it providing insight in the post-colonial identity of Indigenous peoples.

== History ==
The construction of the Church of San Miguel Arcángel in Ixmiquilpan can be understood as a direct symptom of the Spanish conquest and their subsequent Christianising efforts. Upon the arrival of the Franciscans, and eventually the Augustinians, in the 1540s, Indigenous societies witnessed the Christianization of the zone. The construction of this church most likely quickly took place in the years after with historians dating its construction between 1550 and 1560 and the painting of the murals between 1569 and 1572 utilizing local, forced Indigenous labour overseen by Fray Andrés de la Mata de Barrios. Such programs of Christianization and forced Indigenous labour practices were standard in this period; however, this church remains as an extraordinary anomaly due to its unique iconographic content which crosses the boundaries of what the church and Spanish Crown found acceptable during the first troubled century of Christian imposition.

The prominence of pre-Hispanic Aztec iconography in this church’s murals in a period of extreme religious prosecution is better understood with the context of the ongoing Chichimeca war (1550–90) that coincided with its construction. In the latter half of the 16th century, Chichimeca was a major preoccupation for the predominately Hñahñu/Otomí inhabitants of the Mezquital Valley. These sedentary tribes were engaged in constant warfare with the nomadic Chichimeca tribes as the expansion of the Augustinian mission occurred. This war was eventually mobilized by the Spanish Crown as their Augustinian missions were subjected to raids by the Chichimeca tribes; moreover, the existence of the Chichimeca was understood as antithetical to the Augustinian evangelizing efforts with their way of life being considered satanic, pagan, and barbaric by the Spaniards. The very location of Ixmiquilpan—and, by extension, the Church of San Miguel Arcángel—was strategically located on the Chichimeca frontier and borders the sedentary and nomadic peoples. In this sense, convents such as this was a potential place of refuge in the event of a Chichimeca attack.

The psychomachia present in the murals—that is, the struggle between good and evil, vices and virtues, angels and demons—serves to inculcate the idea of triumphal Christianity over the pagan Chichimecas influenced by Satan. It is in this sense that the church and its artworks can be understood as a form of propaganda to further antagonize the Chichimeca tribes with the fundamental evangelizing basis. The syncretism of European art and themes with pre-conquest Aztec iconography would further legitimize the propaganda campaign. In the context of the Northern frontier war, this program would function as propaganda of the “fair war” against the Chichimecas, by presenting a typological display where Indigenous deities echo Christian figures.

== Content of the Murals ==
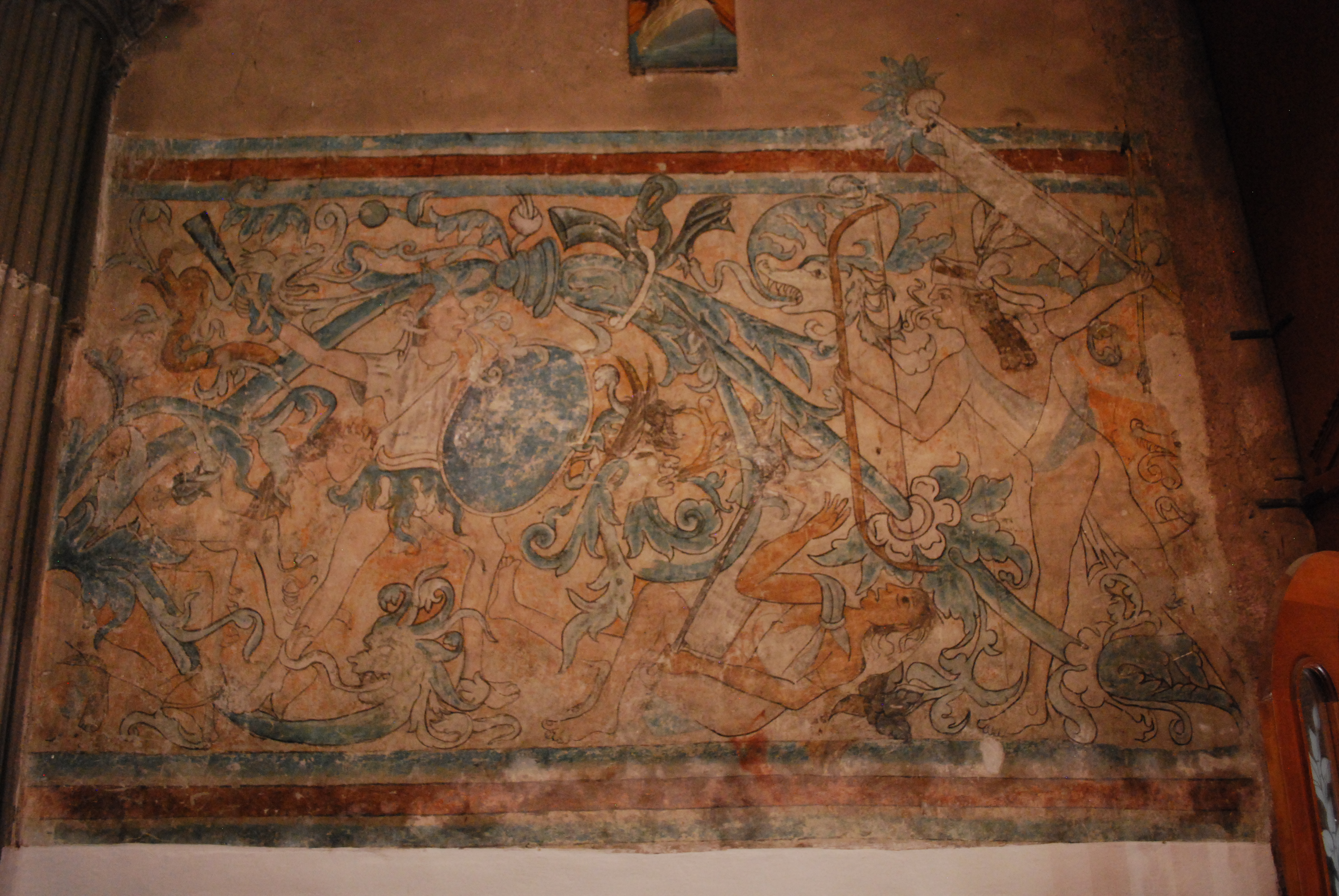
The mural painting of the church

The murals on the walls of the church depict humans and animals in a European naturalist style. However, unlike the static images typical of European artwork in the 16th century, the murals are distinctly alive, almost everything pictured is interacting with something else; this largely has to do with the murals being battle scenes. On the northern band of the frieze, two groups are fighting. On one side of the battle, knights wearing pre-hispanic military outfits are armed with obsidian-bladed spears, some have trophy heads, either in their hands or on their waists. On the other side of the battle, men wearing loincloths and robes are sparsely armed, some have bows and arrows and others are painted reaching for stones to throw. The contrast between the two is severe and is hypothesized as depicting the Chichimeca War. The Chichimeca War was taking place during the construction of the church and was a war between the Spanish Empire (including the Otomíes) and the Chichimecas. The Otomíes are depicted as superior, with traditional military garb and the heads of their enemies in their possession, and are juxtaposed by the desperate and pathetic Chichimecas, wearing minimal clothing, with some picking up stones off the ground to use as their only weapons. The mural evokes Otomí and Christian superiority, but most importantly, it teaches Chichimeca inferiority and creates a common enemy; something crucial for unity between the Otomí and Spanish. The Chichimeca and Otomí have a history of violence, presumably, this part of the mural would have granted the Otomí a good understanding of the Christian themes of good vs evil which are at the forefront of this particular scene.

Eleanor Wake theorizes that the painters took inspiration from yaocuicatl, a traditional Nahua warrior song recorded in the Cantares Mexicanos manuscript. Lines from the song read: “Clever with song, I beat my drum to wake our friends, rousing them to arrow deeds… where flood and blaze are spreading, where the spirit eagle shines, the jaguar growls,” The spreading of flood and blaze is a reference to conquest and war, both of which are common themes depicted in the church murals. The eagle is also an important animal to the Otomíes and Christians. It is associated with bravery, war and victory as it is often depicted eating its prey, or in the case of San Miguel Arcángel, sitting atop an altepetl glyph (the symbol of civilization); presumably as a protector or a symbol of greatness. The eagle is pictured with complex Nahua speech scrolls projecting from its mouth, in a style that mixes the European tradition of speech coming from the mouth of the speaker and the use of Nahua speech scrolls to record what is being said, in an example of artistic syncretism. The eagle is associated with the sun, light, day and life, and is contrasted by the leopard in this verse, which represents the moon, darkness, night and death. Both animals are depicted multiple times throughout the murals and their presence of them breads Christian interpretations of good vs evil once again, and the personification of heaven and hell.

The Church of San Miguel of Arcángel is home to murals that were a very important piece of propaganda for the Augustinian friars working to convert indigenous populations to Christianity. The murals were painted by indigenous artisans and depicted pre-Hispanic warfare with underlying elements of Christian allegory. Since the murals were painted by the indigenous population, it built a connection between their history and the church, likely strengthening their ties to the Spanish conquistadors and Christianity as a whole.
