= Ixtenco =

San Juan Ixtenco Ixtenco
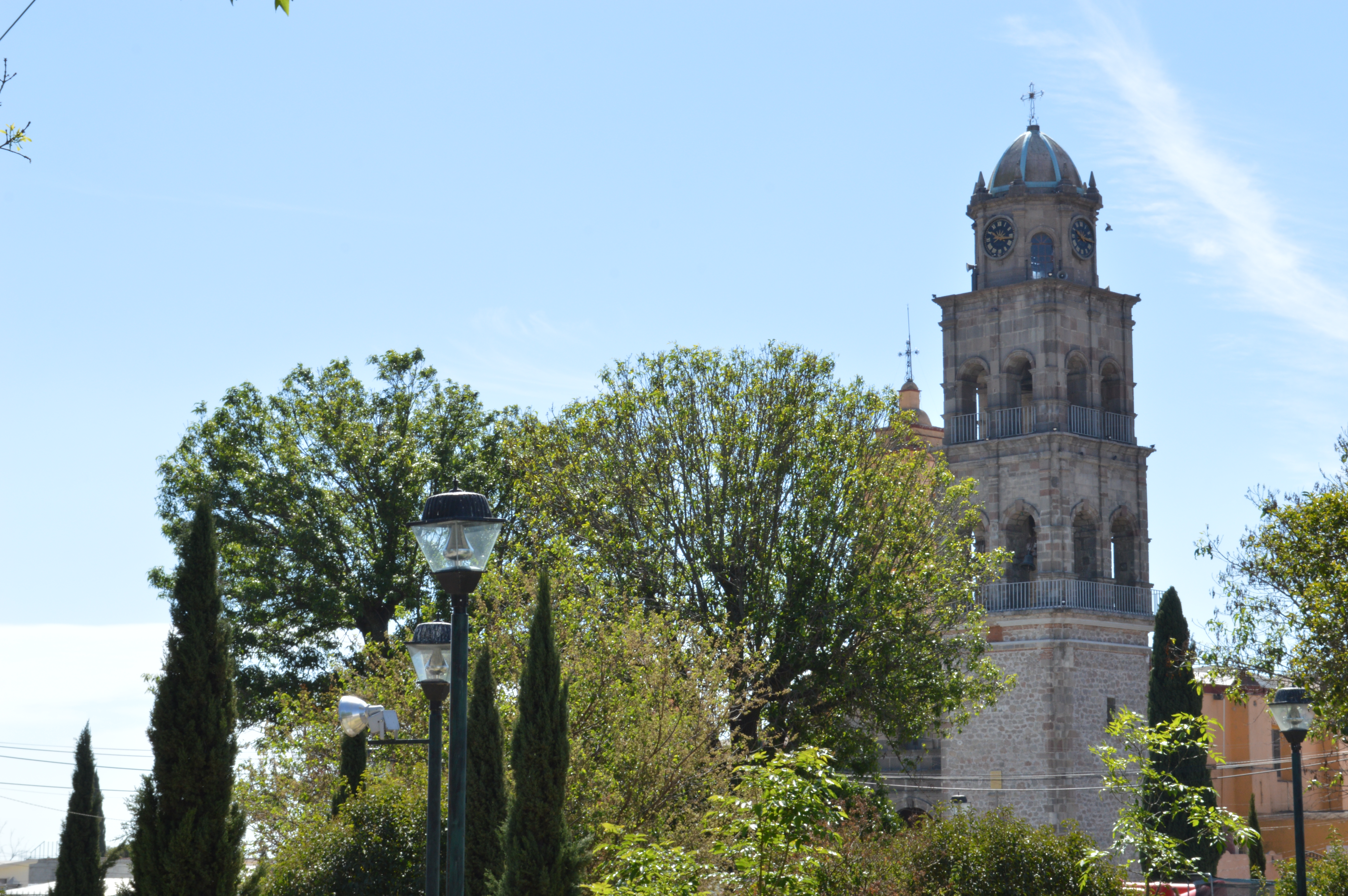
- Looking across plaza towards the San Juan parish
- Interactive map of San Juan Ixtenco
- Coordinates: 19°15′5″N 97°53′39″W
- Country: Mexico
- State: Tlaxcala
- Municipality: Ixtenco Municipality
- Founded: 1532

Government
  - President: Renato Sánchez Rojas

Area
  - Municipality: 43.532 km^{2} (16.808 sq mi)
- Elevation: 2,500 m (8,200 ft)

Population (2010)
  - Total: 6,791
- Time zone: UTC-6 (Central (US Central))

Ixtenco is a town in Ixtenco Municipality, situated in the southeast of the Mexican state of Tlaxcala. It is a traditional Otomi community, which has conserved its agricultural economic base and various traditions. However, it is one of the poorest and least populated of the state's municipalities. The town's main landmark is the San Juan Bautista Parish and the municipality contains the remains of colonial era haciendas. The municipality lies on an old lava flow from the nearby La Malinche volcano, which provides its volcanic soil, but erosion has become a significant problem because of the destruction of forests and overgrazing.

In 2023, Ixtenco was designated a Pueblo Mágico by the Mexican government, recognizing its cultural and historical importance.

== The town ==
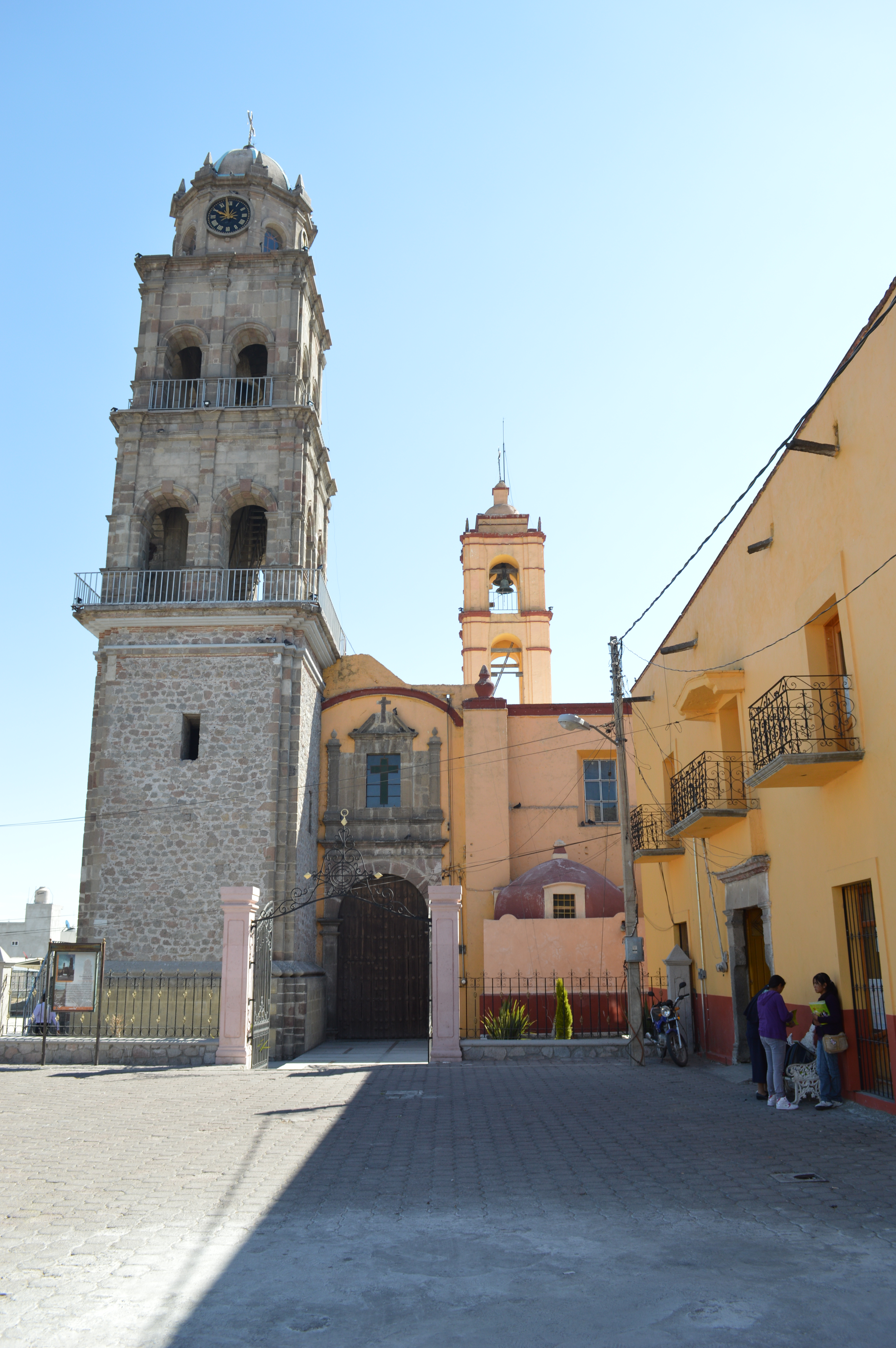
Parish of San Juan Baustista

The town of San Juan Ixtenco has a population of over 5,600 inhabitants. It is centered on a main plaza, which contains the old well, today covered over with a kiosk-like structure.

Its main landmark is the San Juan Bautista Parish, originally built in the 17th century, named after the patron saint of John the Baptist. The only surviving components of the original structure are the side chapel dedicated to Christ, the octagonal cupola, and a posterior building. The rest was rebuilt in the century that followed. It has two bell towers, the larger one of gray sandstone, the tallest in Tlaxcala, which contains the state's largest bell, cast in 1906 and donated by María Juana del Carmen de Jesús. The main entrance is carved with motifs of seeds and a flower called “chimali.” In front of this entrance is an atrium cross of stone from the 17th century. The interior is neo classical altars and the main altar is made of carved cypress. To the side of the main altar, there is another small chapel which contains a Baroque altarpiece which probably belonged to the old church.

Opposite the plaza from the church is the city hall (Spanish: Palacio Municipal) which maintains some of its original construction with most modifications made to the interior, with new walls and modern classroom. The outer walls are made of 60 cm (24 in) thick stone. It has a tile roof, and the façade is simple, with its main façade being flat and white stone up to 90 cm (35 in) thick. Two other chapels face the plaza; the Santa Cruz Chapel and the Virgin of Guadalupe Chapel. The latter was founded by the Franciscans in the 16th century, with construction into the 17th.

== Socioeconomics ==
Ixtenco is in a region of the state of Tlaxcala known for its Otomi population. It has kept much of its ethnic identity, traditional and customs, such as the use of the temazcal, because of its relative isolation. Its main festivals are that of its patron saint, John the Baptist on June 24, and Carnival. The male dancers wear embroidered white shirts and pants and palm frond hats and the women wear embroidered blouses, black skirts and a wrap belt along with rebozo. Traditional dishes include turkey in mole sauce, pipian rojo, barbacoa and dishes made with maguey larvae. The traditional drink is pulque.

The municipality is one of the poorest and least populated in Tlaxcala, with just over 60% living in poverty and 6.2% living in extreme poverty. The most important economic activity remains agriculture and livestock production, also the largest employer, followed by commerce and then industry. Crops include corn, wheat, beans, rye, fava beans, potatoes, peaches, capulins, walnuts, plums and apricots, mostly occurring only in the rainy season due to lack of irrigation. Livestock production is minimal but includes cattle, pigs and goats. However, employment in agriculture has diminished, similar to the situation in the rest of the state.

As of 2009, there were 87 businesses dedicated to industry and handcrafts, employing just under 200 workers. Handcrafts are principally made by the Otomis, who sculpt sandstone, images from seeds and embroidered blouses. Commerce is the fastest growing sector because of urbanization with 196 units employing 377 workers as of 2009.

The municipality has ten schools, eight public and two private. Seven of these serve preschool and primary school students. The average schooling of the population is 8.6 years, just under the state average of 8.8 for the state.

== History ==
The name Ixtenco is from Nahuatl and means on the edge of water (or bank of river) . It is in this language and not Otomi because of the dominance of the Tlaxcallans in the late pre Hispanic period.

The Otomis were the first to settle this area, although the date of their arrival is in dispute. This migration came in waves over time, mixed with Nahua migrations which began after the fall of Teotihuacan in the last Classic period. The population became mixed in the state but eventually the Nahuas became dominant. By the 14th century, the last waves of Otomi migration came to the area, fleeing the rising Aztec Empire in the Valleys of Mexico and Toluca. The Otomis managed to remain relatively dominant in the Ixtenco /Huamantla area, but as vassals of the Tlaxcallan dominion, receiving land in exchange for military service. These same Otomi people were some of the first to fight Hernán Cortés’ initial incursion into central Mexico, and after defeat, allied with the Spanish to conquer the Aztecs.

Ixtenco and the surrounding area was one of the first to receive evangelist Franciscans in 1529, with churches and monasteries quickly constructed. The town itself is said to have been founded on January 8, 1532 although a copy of the royal decree states 1534. The decree by Charles V names the founders as Diego Gabriel, Juan Ponce de León, Francisco de Barba Torres y Paredes, Francisco Contreras and Antonio Gómez Fabián, all conquistadors.

Because of Tlaxcala's role in the conquest of the Aztec Empire, the Otomi of Ixtenco were able to avoid the establishment of encomiendas and some of the worst of Spanish abuse, although studies of human remains from that time indicated that the people still suffered from overwork and malnutrition. Unable to simply take possession of land, the Spanish began gaining access through private transactions, such as the purchase of land by Diego Muñoz Camargo and his indigenous wife Brigida de Contreras to form haciendas.

Although converted, some pagan practices remained and were persecuted. One instance of this in Ixtenco was the case of Juan Coátl and his followers in 1665, who worshipped in a mountain cave which contained a spring. For the indigenous of the area, Coátl was a priest and the mountain sacred, intercessing for the inhabitants of Ixtenco and Huamantla for good crops and other favors. However, he and his followers were denounced by a Spaniard. They were forced to show the Spanish the location of the cave, then eventually hanged.

During the colonial period the area was governed as part of Huamantla, mostly as an Otomi area. These indigenous formed their own community in Ixtenco in 1681 called San Pedro Cuautla, just outside the main town, accounting for most of the population. While isolated both by geography and social caste, Ixtenco was officially expanded in 1695 and again in 1699, mostly to the north.

By the mid 18th century, the Ixtenco area had 2 ranches and four haciendas: Rancho de San Bernardino y Rancho San Miguel, haciendas de San Cristóbal, San José Bautista, San Antonio and San Santiago.

In the late colonial period, the town and area around it had disputes with neighbors over the use of regional natural resources, which had to be resolved by province authorities.

At the start of the Mexican War of Independence, Ixtenco was still a dependency of Huamantla district. After the war, the state was reorganized can elections were held in 1823. The relative peace allows the haciendas to recover and grow. In 1836 the state was reorganized again but Ixtenco remained under Huamantla. In 1849, the town was divided into five neighborhoods, San Antonio, San Juan, San Gabriel, La Resurrección and Santiago.

Ixtenco became an independent municipality sometime during the Reform War, consisting of the town and the haciendas of San Antonio Cuamanala and San Cristóbal Jalapasco along with the San Miguel and Ixtenco ranches. However, in 1874, the municipalities of Zitlaltepec and Huamantla claimed adjoining lands, but unsuccessfully.

Shortly before and during the Revolution, Francisco Bartolo Mendez was a major figure in the municipality, serving as municipal president and on the Agrarian Commission. He worked to return lands and natural resources to Ixtenco from the control of Huamantla.

Just before the Mexican Revolution, there were several anti reelection groups active in this area against Porfirio Díaz. The most important of these was the Partido Antirrelectionista Tlaxcalteca headed by Juan Cuamatzi. In 1910, this leader urged an armed uprising in San Bernardino Contla but was countered by an order from Aquiles Serdan in Puebla. Protests against the Diaz government continued here and elsewhere in Tlaxcala. After Diaz's resignation the Partido Antirrelectionista Tlaxalteca reorganized into the Constitucional Progresista.

In 1916, the state was reorganized and the municipality became part of District II.

In the 20th century, some industry came to Ixtenco but the major change was the area becoming a bedroom community for those working in Huamantla. However, much of its traditional way of life, farming, textiles and religion, have remained intact. Because of its relative isolation, it remains mostly Otomi in identity.

In 1951, the clock was installed at the municipal palace. In 1976 the first deep well was drilled for potable water, with the second drilled in 1986.

== Culture references ==
- Ixtenco was seen in the opening scene of the MCU film Spider-Man: Far From Home, where agents Nick Fury and Maria Hill encounter Mysterio in a destroyed village.
