= Matlatzincan languages =

Oto-Manguean language subgroup of Mexico

Matlatzincan
- Geographic distribution: State of Mexico, Michoacán
- Linguistic classification: Oto-Manguean: Western; Oto-Pame-Chinantecan; Oto-Pame; Matlatzincan
- Subdivisions: Matlatzinca; Tlahuica/Ocuiltec

Language codes
- Glottolog: matl1258

1640 text on the language by Fray Diego Basalenque

The Matlatzincan, Atzinca, Matlatzinca-Ocuilteco-Pirinda, Matlatzinca-Tlahuica, or Matlatitzinca-Atzinca-Pirinda languages are a pair of related languages of the Oto-Manguean language family under the Oto-Pamean branch. They are spoken in the Toluca Valley in two municipalities. The first is Tlahuica or Ocuiltec, spoken in several villages in Ocuilan and the second is Matlatzinca spoken in the village San Francisco Oxtotilpan. A third language, Pirinda, was spoken around Charo and may have been a variety of Matlatzinca.

Both languages are moribund, though in 2003 they were recognised as official languages of Mexico, along with the other indigenous languages of Mexico. Matlatzinca has been documented as having either 1,245 or 2,020 speakers in 2020. There is a conflicting number of Ocuiltec speakers documented in 2020, on the high end having 2,238 speakers while the lower end is 159 speakers, with only 50 fluent elderly speakers identified in 2025. Pirinda went extinct in 1936.

== Proto-language ==
Pascacio Montijo (2011) reconstructed the personal independent pronouns of the Matlatzincan languages as the Proto-Atzinca language. The proposed proto-language is reconstructed from data from both Matlatzincan languages and colonial descriptions of the languages of the Matlatzinco region. In the reconstruction, she identifies 6 location based varieties: the Toluca Valley, Undameo (Morelia), Charo, Mexicaltzingo, San Francisco Oxtotilpan, and San Juan Atzingo (Ocuilan). There is also a seventh group labeled as just Matlatzinca which is used in the situation when there is ambiguity between the San Francisco Oxtotilpan or Mexicaltzingo languages, though both are assumed to be very closely related. San Juan Atzingo corresponds to Ocuiltec. Charo and Undameo, are located on the frontiers of the former Purépecha Empire and fit descriptions of the Pirinda who were allied with the Purépecha.

=== Tone ===
The Matlatzincan languages are tonal. Matlatzinca has a low and high tone, while Ocuiltec has high, low, ascending, and descending tones. There is insufficient evidence for tone reconstruction in Proto-Atzinca.

=== Comparisons ===
The table below shows the comparative elements of the languages (A "?" indicates that there is insufficient data):

	Language – Location					
Comparison	Toluca Valley	Undameo	Charo	Mexicaltzingo	Oxtotilpan	Atzingo
Third-person marker	t’ǝwi					let’ǝ
Nominal prefixes we- and in-	?	Allowed		Not Allowed		
/wi/ in third person, dual and plural	Yes					No
Dual	-wewi					-k^{w}e
First and second person plural	-howi					-k^{h}o
Diffuse, acute, continuant phoneme	/r/					/l/
Root vowel length in the second person	Short			?	Long	
/n/ at the morpheme boundary of third person and plural	Yes					No
Elision of /i/ from person affixes before number affixes	First and second person					First only
Processes for breaking up consonant clusters	the consonant of the number morpheme becomes a feature of the consonant of the person morpheme					identical consonants deleted
Aspirated allophones of acute consonants	No					[l^{y}], [t^{’y}], [n^{hy}]
Voicing of the initial consonant /k/	[g]					No
Final vowel of the first-person singular pronouns	[i]					[ǝ]

== See also ==
- Matlatzinca people
- Languages of Mexico
- Oto-Manguean languages
