= Ixtenco Municipality =

Ixtenco
- Municipality
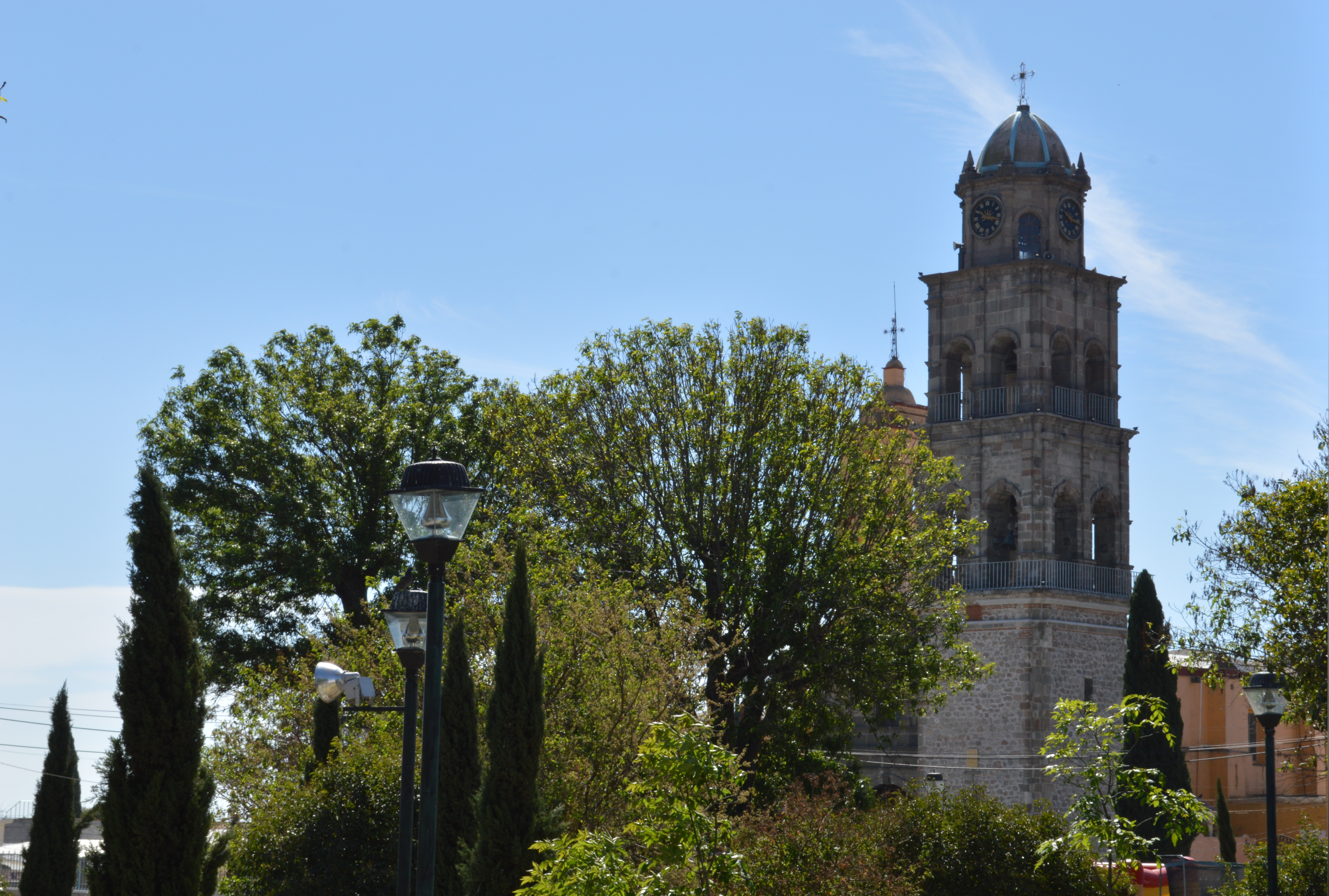

- Location within Tlaxcala Location within Mexico
- Coordinates: 19.25°N 97.8833°W
- Country: Mexico
- State: Tlaxcala
- Municipal seat: Ixtenco
- Time zone: UTC-6 (Central)

Ixtenco is a municipality in the Mexican state of Tlaxcala.

Ixtenco covers a territory of roughly 43.5 km^{2} (16.8 sq mi). Apart from the town of Ixtenco, which is the seat of the local government, the municipality contains only one other community, called Miguel Muñoz León. The municipality borders the municipalities of Huamantla and Trinidad Sánchez Santos, as well as the State of Puebla. The municipal government consists of a municipal president, one syndic and seven representatives called regidors. The terrain sits on an old lava flow which determines the areas soil composition and underground water flows.

From its past, the municipality contains the ruins of two major haciendas from the 18th century. The San Antonio Cuauhtla Hacienda is still largely intact, while the San Cristóbal Haciendia is in ruins.

== Geography and environment ==
The municipality is on the Trans-Mexican Volcanic Belt, almost entirely on the lower slopes of volcano La Malinche with an average altitude of 2500 m AMSL. It is on an old solidified lava flow, which accounts for the area's volcanic soil. About thirty percent of the territory is rugged, mostly in the west and center. The rest of the territory is semi-flat, especially in the northwest and southeast. One notable geographic landmark is Xalapasco hill (2750 m AMSL), a small extinct volcano which contain nine maar-like craters.

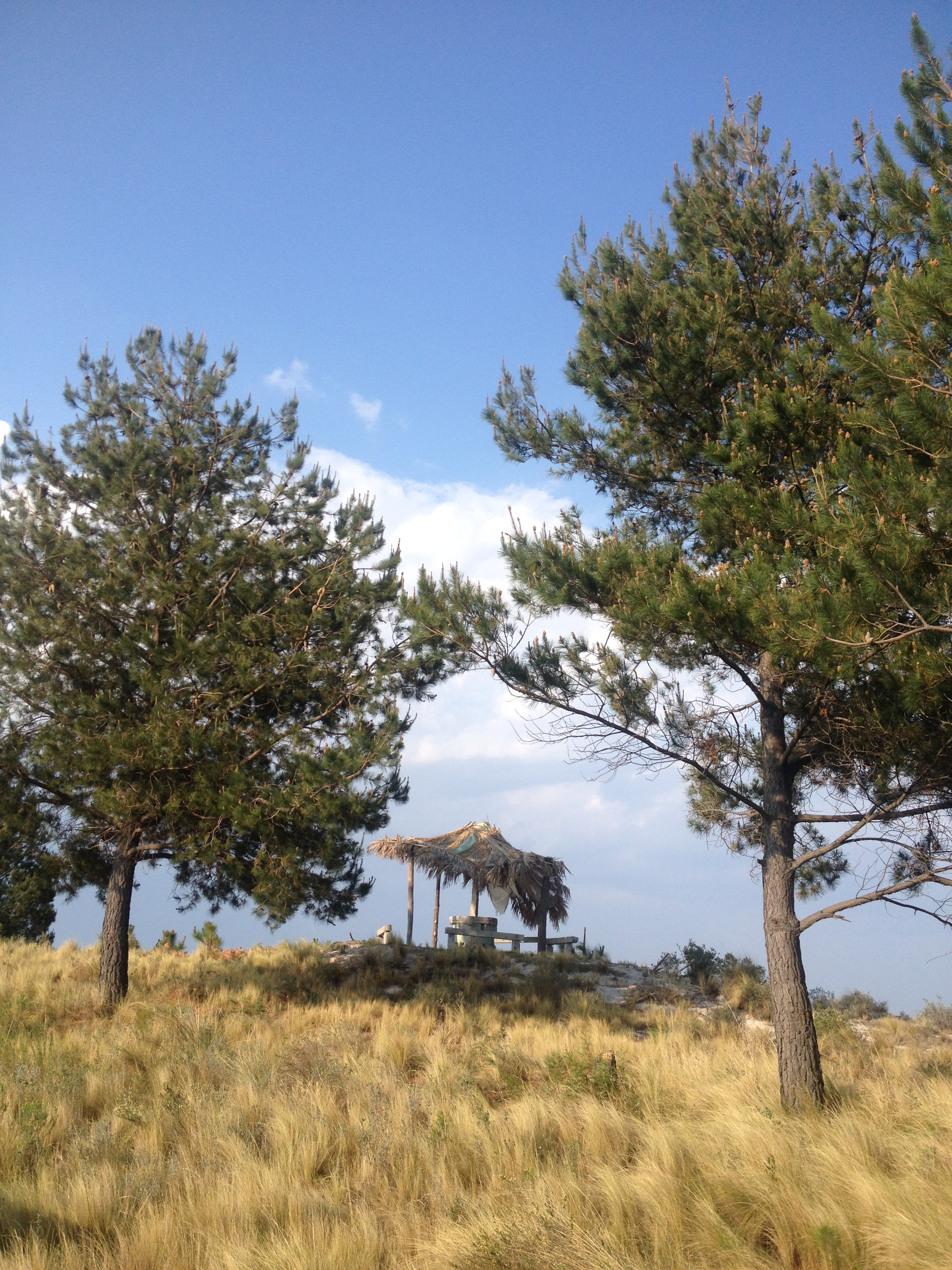
Summit of Xalapasco hill

Most of the municipality has a temperate climate with a rainy season in the summer. Average annual temperatures vary between 8-16 °C. The average annual rainfall varies between 600–1100 mm. There is no surface water except for streams that run during the rainy season and a freshwater spring on the side of La Malinche Volcano. Potable water for the municipality comes from this spring and wells.

Only vestiges of the area's original Madrean pine-oak woodlands and grassland survive, mostly on Xalapasco hill and in the extreme west of the municipality. Most of the area is inhabited or otherwise modified by human activity. Little wildlife remains as well but includes coyotes, rabbits, squirrels, opossums, skunks, as well as multiple birds, reptiles and insects.

Urbanization of the area has led to problems with garbage and water pollution, but the most serious issue is soil erosion due to deforestation and overgrazing. There have been reforestation efforts, mostly pine species, but these have not been sufficient to stop further environmental damage from unchecked running water and wind coming down from La Malinche.
