= Macedonia Blas Flores =

Mexican women's rights activist (1958-)

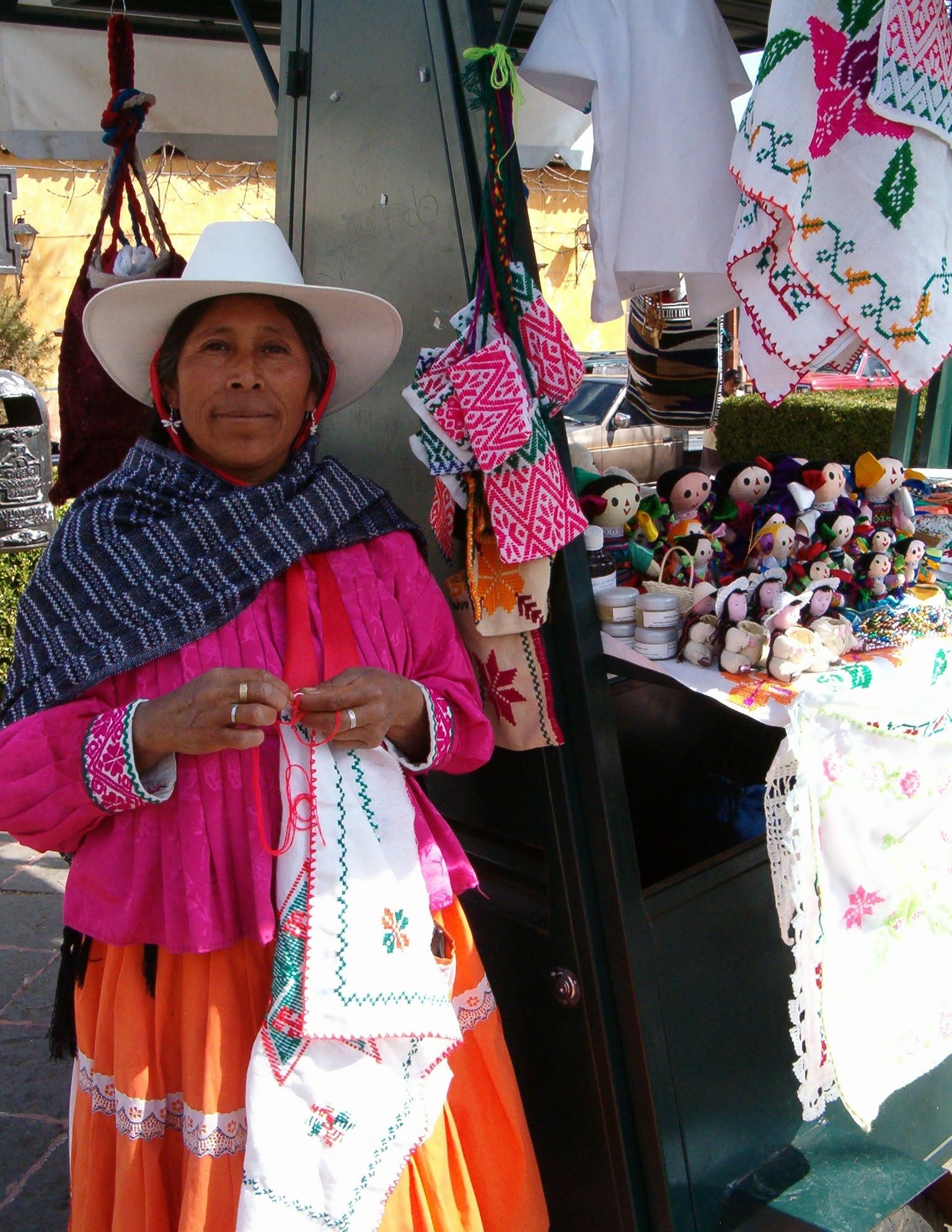
Macedonia Blas Flores in 2005

Macedonia Blas Flores (born 1958) is a Mexican human rights activist of hñañú origin. She was a candidate for the Nobel Peace Prize in 2005, because of the activism she wages against the violence suffered by the women of her tribe, the Otomi. Since 1997, she has headed the civil association Fotzi Ñahño, which aids Otomi.

== Biography ==
Blas Flores is from El Bothe, San Ildefonso Tultepec, municipality of Amealco, Queretaro. The mother of 12 children spent decades selling handicrafts. Since 1997, she has worked for Fotzi Ñahño, where she speaks on human rights and gender violence against hñañú. Her work at the association features workshops for women regarding gender violence, prevention of violations among indigenous girls, prevention of women's alcoholism. She is also involved in projects for planting vegetables and she supports women's economic development. She says, "What I do is fine because I do it for all women who suffer violence."

In 2003, she was falsely accused by two women (mother and daughter) of adultery. The punishment in her rural indigenous village included being held down and having chili paste applied to her genitals, causing injury. The activist, advised by the human rights commission of the state of Hidalgo, filed a criminal complaint against the aggressor, becoming the first indigenous woman to do so. She traveled to Mexico City and informed members of Congress about her ordeal, a fact that caught the attention of activists and media. From this, Blas Flores decided to engage more actively in the defense of the rights of women hñañú, which earned her recognition as a candidate for the Nobel Peace Prize in 2005. This also spurred her to learn to read and write, and perform basic mathematical operations through Instituto Nacional para la Educación de los Adultos.

In 2005, Blas Flores was part of the proposed candidacy of Association of 1000 Women for the Nobel Peace Prize because of her activism supporting women in her community.

In 2017, Blas Flores was awarded the Medal of Honor "Nelson Mandela" of the Legislative Power of Querétaro.
