= Margarito Fierros =

Mexican politician

- Born: 29 January 1967 (age 59); Ajuchitlán del Progreso, Guerrero, Mexico
- Occupation: Politician
- Political party: PRD

Margarito Fierros Tano (born 29 January 1967) is a Mexican politician affiliated with the Party of the Democratic Revolution (PRD). In the 2003 mid-terms he was elected to the Chamber of Deputies to represent Michoacán's sixth district during the 59th session of Congress.
