= Maguey =

Maguey may refer to various American plants:

- Genus Agave, especially
  - Species Agave americana, the century plant
  - Species Agave salmiana
- Genus Furcraea, a source of natural fiber
- Maguey flowers, an edible flower

== Other uses ==
In music, Maguey also refers to:

- Banda Maguey, a Mexican music band
