= Ocuiltec language =

Moribund Oto-Manguean language of Mexico

Ocuiltec
- Tlahuica
- Pjyɇkakjó
- Native to: Mexico
- Region: State of Mexico
- Ethnicity: Tlahuica
- Native speakers: 159 (2020); 50 (fluent, 2025)
- Language family: Oto-Manguean: Oto-Pame; Matlatzincan; Ocuiltec

Language codes
- ISO 639-3: ocu
- Glottolog: atzi1235
- ELP: Ocuiltec; Ocuiltec

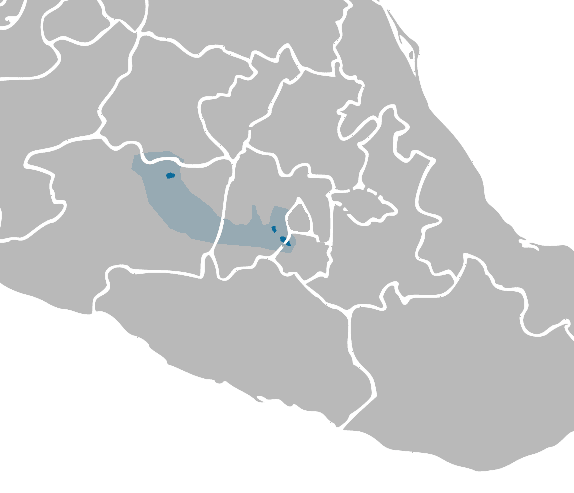
Matlatzinca-Atzinca-Pirinda languages. Extension at the beginning of 20th century and earlier extension in 16th century

Ocuiltec is a moribund language of Central Mexico closely related to Matlatzinca and Pirinda. Ocuiltec is also known as Tlahuica, Atzinca, and Atzingo Matlatzinca. "Ocuiltec" is commonly used in English, while Tlahuica is the preferred name in Spanish. The autonym Pjyɇkakjó or Pjiekakjoo is also preferred. Ocuiltec and Matlatzinca are both endangered with less than 2,000 speakers, while Prinida went extinct in 1936. There are revitalization efforts.

== Name ==
The names Ocuiltec and Ocuilteco are synonymous with Tlahuica, though more common in English, appearing in several English language dissertations, books, and other academic material. The name may derive from Nahuatl ocuiltecah which means "places of worms." Ocuilteco was used in colonial documents to refer to the Ocuilan region which later extended to the inhabitants, despite their differences.

In Spanish, Tlahuica is more common and preferred. Tlahuica also derives from Nahuatl and means "people who work the land" and were called so because their highly productive agricultural society. Linguist Aileen Martínez writes that the term Ocuilteco is offensive to the natives, who prefer that they be called Tlahuica or by their autonym, Pjyɇkakjó. Pjyɇkakjó [p^{j}əkak^{h}ó] and Pjiekakjoo [p^{h}iekakhoː] are both variants of the same word and mean "what we are" or "what we speak."

Aztinca, Atzinteco, and Atzingo Matlatzinca are older regional terms that referred to the same language as spoken in San Juan Atzingo and San José el Totoc.

== Distribution ==
Ocuiltec was centered around San Juan Atzingo within the municipality of Ocuilan, and is spoken in the nearby communities of Cinco Caminos, Colonia Doctor Gustavo Baz, El Capulín, El Totoc (San José Totoc), Lomas de Teocaltzingo (Loma de Tecalzingo), Ocuilán de Artéaga, Santa Lucía, Santa Martha, and Santa María Nativitas. Historically, it may have been spoken in the adjacent area of Morelos, though Matlatzinca could have also been spoken.

The language is morbid with a conflicting numbers of speakers that has been declining since 1970. In 1970 only 400 speakers were recorded in the census; in 1987 there was 1,432 speakers, 804 recorded in 1990, 412 in 2000, and 719 in 2010. It was reported in 2000 that were between 400 and 515 speakers whose ages ranged from 60 to 85. The 2020 census recorded 2,238 speakers throughout Mexico, but this may just be indicator of those who identify as Tlahuica or have some knowledge of the language. The Secretariat of Economy recorded only 159 speakers in the Ocuilan municipality in 2020. These conflicting numbers may be due the a majority of speakers having passive knowledge or able to understand the language, but not speak it, while fluent speakers were very low. There are no longer any monolingual speakers.

In 2025, only 50 fluent speakers, whom are all elderly, were identified, a majority of them in the community of Lomas de Teocaltzingo.

== Variety ==
There is a variety of Tlahuica called Tlatol which is considered a ritual language that is used during religious events. It has two forms: Small or Short, and Big or Long. Long Tlatol is no longer known. It consists of a series of dialogues between two groups, the host and the visitor, one groups leads and the other answers. It regards the knowledge left by ancestors as well as everyday life. It was very emotional and the language could provoke tears. In old times the Tlatoledas could last several hours and were complex, but they have become shorter as knowledge of the language has declined. All religious ceremonies used to be conducted in Tlatol, but now most are done in Spanish with the Day of the Dead celebration still done in Tlatol. Children no longer learn Tlatol and about 13 elders claimed to be able speak it in 2012.

== Alphabet ==
An alphabet for Ocuiltec was first designed in 1982 and revised in 1998. It notably consists of vowel letters with strokes. Some of these vowel letters can't be displayed and instead their closest equivalents are used for this article. The alphabet is as follows:

a e i o u ø ɨ b k ch d f g j l m n ñ p r s t w x y ts ds ? by dy ly py ty ky xy

The U with stroke was used in the Ocuiltec alphabet, but cannot reliably be displayed.

The letters a e i o u are all pronounced the same as in Spanish with vowels particular to Ocuiltec being ɇ ɨ ø ʉ. These letters respectively represent the sounds /ə ɨ ʌ ʉ/. Outside of academic material, the vowels with strokes aren't used, except for ɇ and ø.

Another practical alphabet was proposed and developed in 2014. This one condenses Ocuiltec's possible 50 graphemes into a simple 29 letter alphabet with combinations used to represent each of Ocuiltec's sounds and tones:

a b ch d e ɇ f g j k i ɨ l m n ñ o ø p r s t u ʉ w x y z ’

b represents /β/ and /b/.

dz represents /d͡ʒ/.

f represents /ɸ/.

j represents /h/.

x represents /ʃ/.

ch’, k’, p’, t’ and ts’ are glottalized.

py, by, ty, dy, ly, my, ny and jy are palatalized consonants.

pw and kw are labialized.

There are four tones: high, low, ascending, and descending. The high and ascending tones are marked with diacritic while the low and descending tones are unmarked (xituú "corn husk", xitu "hair").

Long vowels are doubled (ñuuja '"earth", nloó "gopher", wenduu "dead").

Another alphabet was drafted by community members and linguists in 2019, which consists of 42 consonants and 9 vowels.

== Phonology ==
=== Consonants ===
| | Labial | | | | | Alveolar | | | | | Palatal | | | Velar | | | | Glottal | |
| | plain | pal. | eje. | asp. | lab. | plain | pal. | eje. | asp. | lab. | plain | eje. | asp. | plain | eje. | asp. | lab. | plain | pal. |
|---|---|---|---|---|---|---|---|---|---|---|---|---|---|---|---|---|---|---|---|
| Nasal | m | | | | | n | | | | | ɲ | | | (ŋ) | | | | | |
| Plosive | p | pʲ | pʼ | pʰ | pʷ | t | tʲ | tʼ | tʰ | | | | | k | kʼ | kʰ | kʷ | ʔ | |
| Plosive | b | | | | | d | dʲ | | | | | | | ɡ | | | | | |
| Affricate | | | | | | t͡s | | tsʼ | | | t͡ʃ | tʃʼ | tʃʰ | | | | | | |
| Affricate | | | | | | | | | | | d͡ʒ | | | | | | | | |
| Fricative | β | | | | | s | | | | | ʃ | | | | | | | h | hʲ |
| Fricative | ɸ | | | | | z | | | | | | | | | | | | | |
| Rhotic | | | | | | ɾ | | | | | | | | | | | | | |
| Approximant | | | | | | l | lʲ | | | | j | | | w | | | | | |

- /n/ is heard as velar [ŋ] when before velar stops.
- Sounds /m, n, (ɲ), l, j, w/ all become voiceless [m̥, n̥, (ɲ̊), l̥, j̊, w̥] when in groups with /h/.
- Stop sounds /p, t, t͡s, t͡ʃ, k, kʷ/ are voiced as [b, d, d͡z, d͡ʒ, ɡ, ɡʷ] when following nasals.
- /l/ may be heard as voiceless [l̥] in word-final or syllable-final positions.
- /w/ may be heard as a labialized fricative [ɣʷ] in intervocalic positions.
- Sounds /p, (b), m/ may also be heard as labialized [pʷ, (bʷ), mʷ] when preceding /ɨ/.
- Sounds /t, (d), l, n/ may tend to palatalize as [tʲ, (dʲ), lʲ, nʲ~ɲ] when before high vowels /i, ɨ, u/.
- Other sounds such as /f, r/, are heard from Spanish loanwords.

=== Vowels ===
| | Front | Central | Back |
|---|---|---|---|
| Close | i iː | ɨ ɨː | u uː |
| Mid | ɛ ɛː | ə əː | ɔ ɔː |
| Open | | a aː | |

- /i/ is heard as [ɪ] in closed syllables.
- Vowels may also be heard as nasalized [Ṽ] when preceding nasal consonants.

=== Tones ===
Ocuiletc is a tonal language with two level tones, high and low, and two contour tones, ascending and descending. Long vowels rarely have a low tone.

== Sample Text ==
Article 1 of the Universal Declaration of Human Rights:

Ocuiltec (Tlahuica) translation: Ndumø 1: Ndyetso ñebet’a milndañe nlibre jo miplañe benye pa mulo pima jo ñelderechu jo, ligt’eñe ndityefbiñe nrazon mbi pima jo nkonciencia, legt’eñe ndujɇñe ñeluju pima benye ndyetso ñebet’a.

English translation: Article 1: All human beings are born free and equal in dignity and rights. They are endowed with reason and conscience and should act towards one another in a spirit of brotherhood.
