= Amealco de Bonfil Municipality =

Amealco de Bonfil
- Municipality
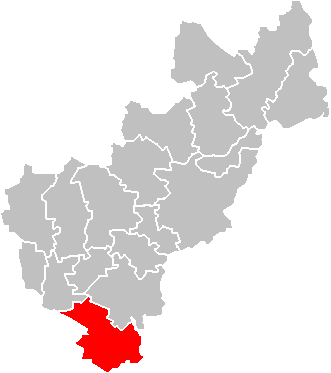
- Location of the municipality in Querétaro
- Coordinates: 20.1603°N 100.1096°W
- Country: Mexico
- State: Querétaro
- Municipal seat: Amealco de Bonfil
- Time zone: UTC-6 (Central)

Amealco de Bonfil is a municipality in the central Mexican state of Querétaro.

The municipal seat is at Amealco de Bonfil.
