= Amealco de Bonfil =

- Town
- Coat of arms

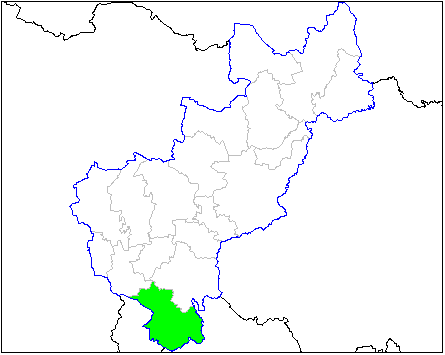
- Location of Amealco de Bonfil in Querétaro.
- Coordinates: 20°11′17″N 100°08′38″W
- Country: Mexico
- State: Querétaro
- Municipal seat: Amealco de Bonfil
- Largest city: Amealco de Bonfil

Government
  - Municipal president: René Mejía Montoya PRI (ApM)

Area
  - Total: 682.1 km^{2} (263.4 sq mi)

Population (2020)
  - Total: 66,841
  - Density: 97.99/km^{2} (253.8/sq mi)
- Data source: INEGI
- Time zone: UTC-6 (CST)
- INEGI code: 001
- HDI (2000): 0.6803
- GDP (per capita) (2000): US$2,200
- Website: (in Spanish) Municipio de Amealco de Bonfil, Querétaro

Amealco is a town in the Mexican state of Querétaro. Its name is thought to mean place of springs in Nahuatl. It is the seat of Amealco de Bonfil Municipality, and is located 63 kilometres (39 mi) southeast of Santiago de Querétaro. Its elevation is 2,605 metres (8,547 ft) above sea level, and the annual temperature ranges from 15 to 20 °C (59 to 68 °F). It is one of the oldest settlements of Querétaro, having been founded in 1538 by Fernando de Tapia (also known as Conín) and Nicolás de San Luis Montañez, who would also found the Querétaro state capital.

In the early 19th century, a group of French and Spanish entrepreneurs settled in the city and began the logging industry, which at its peak was one of the main suppliers of wood to Mexico City, and also exported wood to France and the United States. The governments of these two countries issued diplomas kept in the Palacio Municipal that certify the quality of Amealco's products.

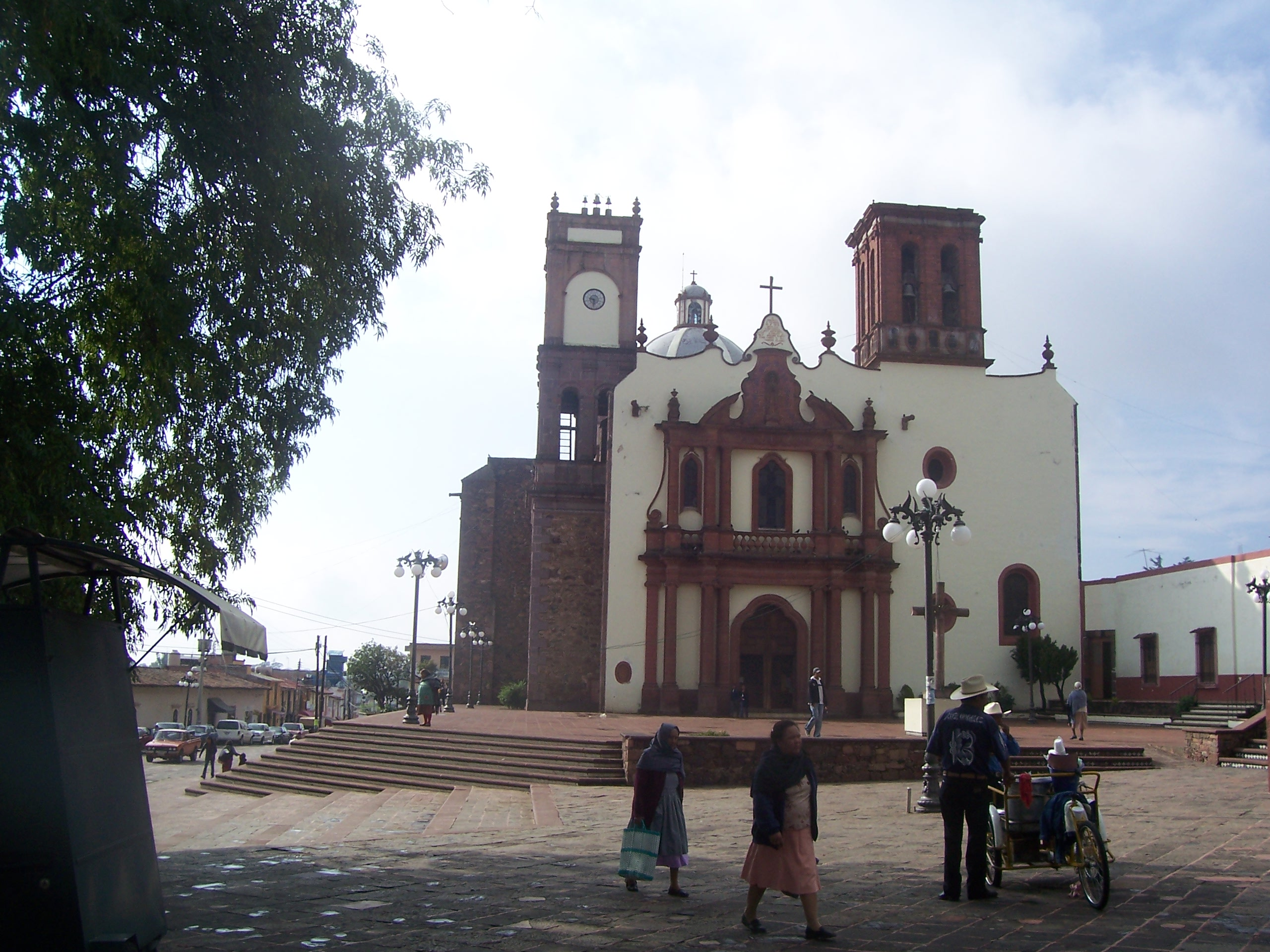
A church in central Amealco.

The Hñähñu or Otomí people are concentrated in the southern and eastern parts of the municipality, in 34 settlements. The main ones are Santiago Mexquititlán and San Ildefonso Tultepec. They number around 20,000 people, or 36% of the total population. Amealco is the municipality with the highest concentration of indigenous people, with almost 80% of the State's total.

== Notable people ==
- Macedonia Blas Flores, women's rights activist
- Ricardo Pozas Arciniega, anthropologist, scientific investigator and indigenista

== See also ==
- Mexican rag dolls (Marias)
