= San Francisco Oxtotilpan =

Village in Mexico

Coordinates: 19°10′07″N 99°54′09″W

San Francisco Oxtotilpan is a village in located in the municipality of Temascaltepec in the state of Mexico, Mexico.

== Climate ==
Climate data for San Francisco Oxtotilpan (1991–2020 normals, 1961–present)
Month	Jan	Feb	Mar	Apr	May	Jun	Jul	Aug	Sep	Oct	Nov	Dec	Year
Record high °C (°F)	28.5 (83.3)	29 (84)	33 (91)	31 (88)	29 (84)	29.5 (85.1)	31 (88)	32 (90)	27 (81)	45 (113)	40 (104)	30 (86)	45 (113)
Mean daily maximum °C (°F)	19.4 (66.9)	20.8 (69.4)	22.4 (72.3)	23.1 (73.6)	22.8 (73.0)	21.2 (70.2)	20.4 (68.7)	20.5 (68.9)	20.5 (68.9)	21.0 (69.8)	20.6 (69.1)	19.9 (67.8)	21.0 (69.8)
Daily mean °C (°F)	10.2 (50.4)	11.2 (52.2)	12.6 (54.7)	13.7 (56.7)	14.4 (57.9)	14.4 (57.9)	13.7 (56.7)	13.7 (56.7)	13.5 (56.3)	13.0 (55.4)	11.6 (52.9)	10.6 (51.1)	12.7 (54.9)
Mean daily minimum °C (°F)	1.0 (33.8)	1.6 (34.9)	2.9 (37.2)	4.4 (39.9)	6.0 (42.8)	7.6 (45.7)	7.1 (44.8)	6.9 (44.4)	6.6 (43.9)	5.0 (41.0)	2.6 (36.7)	1.2 (34.2)	4.4 (39.9)
Record low °C (°F)	−11 (12)	−5 (23)	−5 (23)	−5 (23)	0 (32)	0 (32)	0 (32)	0 (32)	0 (32)	−1 (30)	−5 (23)	−10 (14)	−11 (12)
Average precipitation mm (inches)	24.6 (0.97)	15.0 (0.59)	24.1 (0.95)	35.0 (1.38)	170.4 (6.71)	249.7 (9.83)	281.6 (11.09)	277.9 (10.94)	231.3 (9.11)	135.4 (5.33)	48.4 (1.91)	23.3 (0.92)	1,516.7 (59.71)
Average precipitation days (≥ 0.01 mm)	3.0	1.9	3.3	4.4	13.9	20.4	25.6	25.1	21.8	14.1	6.2	2.8	142.5
Source: Servicio Meteorológico Nacional
