= Acazulco Otomi =

Otomi language of Mexico

- San Jeronimo Acazulco Otomi
- Ndöö́ngüǘ yühǘ
- Native to: Mexico
- Region: Ocoyoacac, Mexico State
- Native speakers: 100–200 (2017)
- Language family: Oto-Manguean: Oto-Pamean; Otomian; Eastern; Acazulco Otomi
- Writing system: Latin

Language codes
- ISO 639-3: –
- Glottolog: None

San Jeronimo Acazulco Otomi, or Ocoyoacac Otomí, is a moribund and seriously endangered dialect of the Otomi language spoken by a hundred or so people in the town of San Jerónimo Acazulco in Ocoyoacac, Mexico State.

Only people born before c. 1950 are fluent, and all of them speak Spanish on a daily basis. Acazulco Otomi has been classified as Eastern Otomi by Lastra (2006). It is more conservative, and closer to Eastern Highland Otomi, than its neighboring Tilapa Otomi. There are revitalization efforts underway.

== Phonology ==
Acazulco Otomi has ejective consonants as well as aspirated stops which correspond to fricatives in other varieties of Otomi, and is similar to reconstructions of the Proto-Otomi language.

== See also ==
- Otomi language dialects
- Oto-Pamean languages
- Indigenous languages of the Americas

== Sources ==
- "Search results". The Archive of the Indigenous Languages of Latin America. Archived from the original on 2021-08-31.
- Lastra, Yolanda (2006). Los Otomies – Su lengua y su historia (in Spanish). Universidad Nacional Autonoma de México, Instituto de investigaciones Antropológicas. ISBN 978-970-323388-5.
- Hernández Green, N. (2015). Morfosintaxis verbal del otomí de Acazulco (in Spanish). Unpublished PhD thesis in Indoamerican Linguistics at the Centre for Research and High Studies in Social Anthropology (CIESAS), Mexico.
- Turnbull, R. (2016). The phonetics and phonology of lexical prosody in San Jerónimo Acazulco Otomi. Journal of the International Phonetic Association, 1-32.
- Hernández-Green, N. (2016). Registration Versus Applicative Constructions in Acazulco Otomi 1. International Journal of American Linguistics, 82(3), 353-383.
- Turnbull, Rory; Pharao Hansen, Magnus & Ditte Boeg Thomsen. 2011, How a moribund dialect can contribute to the bigger picture: Insights from Acazulco Otomí (audio of presentation)
- Ndöö́ngüǘ yühǘ: Guía de aprendizaje principiante del idioma otomí de San Jerónimo Acazulco, Estado de México
- Pharao Hansen, M., Hernández-Green, N., Turnbull, R., & Thomsen, D. B. (2016). Life histories, language attitudes and linguistic variation: Navigating the micropolitics of language revitalization in an Otomí community in Mexico. In Language Documentation and Revitalization in Latin American Contexts. De Gruyter Mouton.
- Pharao Hansen, Magnus. 2012. Kinship in the Past Tense: Language, Care and Cultural Memory in a Mexican Community
- Pharao Hansen, Magnus; Turnbull, Rory & Ditte Boeg Thomsen. 2011, From academic salvage linguistics to community-based documentation in only three weeks: Report from a collective and interdisciplinary fieldwork on Acazulco Otomi
