= Sierra Otomi =

Language

- Highland Otomi
- Yųhų (Eastern Highland Otomi); Ñųhų (Texcatepec, Tenango)
- Native to: Mexico
- Region: Puebla, Veracruz, Hidalgo
- Native speakers: (72,000 cited 1990–2007)
- Language family: Oto-Manguean: Oto-Pamean; Otomian; Eastern; Sierra Otomi

Official status
- Regulated by: Secretaría de Educación Pública

Language codes
- ISO 639-3: Variously: otm – Eastern Highland otx – Texcatepec otn – Tenango
- Glottolog: east2556 Eastern Highland texc1235 Texcatepec tena1241 Tenango

Sierra Otomi a.k.a. Highland Otomi (Otomi de la Sierra) is a dialect cluster of the Otomi language spoken in Mexico by ca. 70,000 people in the highlands of Eastern Hidalgo, Western Veracruz and Northern Puebla. The speakers themselves call the language Yųhų (Eastern Highland) or Ñųhų (Texcatepec and Tenango). Lastra 2001 classifies it as an Eastern Otomi language together with Ixtenco Otomi, Tilapa Otomi, and Acazulco Otomi. The three varieties of Sierra Otomi—Eastern Highland, Texcatepec, and Tenango—are above 70% lexically similar; the Eastern Highland dialects are above 80%, and will be considered here.

== Distribution ==
Municipalities with significant Sierra Otomi populations include the following (Dow 2005:236). Many of these municipalities also have Tepehua, Totonac, and Nahuatl speakers.

Hidalgo

- Acaxochitlan
- Huehuetla
- San Bartolo Tutotepec
- Tenango de Doria
- Tulancingo

Puebla

- Francisco Z. Mena
- Pahuatlán
- Pantepec
- Tlacuilotepec
- Tlaxco

Veracruz

- Benito Juárez
- Chicóntepec
- Coatzintla
- Coyutla
- Huayacocotla
- Ixhuatlán de Madero
- Temapache
- Texcatepec
- Tihuatlán
- Tlachichilco
- Zacualpan

== Phonology ==
The phonemic inventory given below is based on the particular phonology of the Otomi de la Sierra dialect as documented by Voigtlander and Echegoyen (1985), phonemic inventories of other dialects vary slightly from that of Otomi de la Sierra.

=== Consonants ===
	Bilabial		Dental	Alveolar		Palatal	Velar		Glottal
Nasal	m			n					
Plosive	p	b		t	d		k	ɡ	ʔ
Affricate				ts	dz				
Fricative	ɸ		θ			ʃ	x		h
Flap				ɾ					
Semivowel						j	w		

=== Vowels ===
	Front		Central		Back	
	oral	nasal	oral	nasal	oral	nasal
Close	i	ĩ	ʉ		u	ũ
Open-mid	e		ø			õ
Mid	ɛ	ɛ̃			ɔ	
Open			ɑ	ɑ̃		

== Orthography ==
=== Alphabet ===
- a - [ɑ]
- a̱, ä - [ɔ]
- b - [b]
- ch - [t͡ʃ]
- d - [d]
- e - [e]
- e̱, ë - [ɛ]
- f - [ɸ]
- g - [g]
- h - [h]
- i - [i]
- j - [x]
- k - [k]
- l - [l]
- m - [m]
- n - [n]
- ñ - [ɲ]
- o - [ɔ/o]
- o̱ - [ø]
- p - [p]
- r - [ɾ]
- s - [s]
- t - [t]
- th - [θ]
- ts - [t͡s]
- u - [u/w]
- u̱, ʉ - [ʉ/ɨ]
- x - [ʃ]
- y - [j]
- z - [z/d͡z]

=== Other letters ===
- ą - [ɑ̃]
- ę - [ɛ̃]
- į - [ĩ]
- ǫ - [ɔ̃]
- ų - [ũ]

=== Tones ===
Tones are usually not marked.

- a - low tone
- á - high tone
- ǎ - rising tone
- à - falling tone
