= Classical Otomi =

Early form of the Otomi language

Classical Otomi is the name used for the Otomi language as spoken in the early centuries of Spanish colonial rule in Mexico and documented by Spanish friars who learned the language in order to catechize the Otomi peoples. During the colonial period, many Otomis learned to write their language in Roman letters. As a consequence, a significant number of documents in Otomi, both secular and religious, exist from the period, and the most well-known documents are the Codices of Huichapan and Jilotepec. Text in classical Otomi is not easily accessible since the Spanish speaking friars failed to differentiate the varied vowel and consonant sounds of the Otomi language.

Friars wrote several grammars, the earliest documented of which was the Arte de la lengua othomí [sic] of Pedro de Cárceres in 1580 (but not published until 1907). In 1605, Alonso de Urbano wrote a trilingual Spanish-Nahuatl-Otomi dictionary, which also included a small set of grammatical notes about Otomi. The grammarian of Nahuatl, Horacio Carochi, is known to have written a grammar of Otomi, but no copies have survived. In the latter half of the eighteenth century, an anonymous Jesuit cleric wrote the grammar Luces del Otomi, and Neve y Molina wrote a dictionary and a grammar.

== Works cited ==
- Cárceres, Pedro de (1907) [ca. 1550-1600]. Nicolás León (ed.). "Arte de la lengua othomí". Boletín del Instituto Bibliográfico Mexicano (6). Mexico D.F.: Instituto Bibliográfico Mexicano.: 39–155.
- Yolanda Lastra; Doris Bartholomew, eds. (2001). Códice de Huichapan: paleografía y traducción. Translated by Ecker, Lawrence. México, D.F.: Instituto de Investigaciones Antropológicas-UNAM. ISBN 968-36-9005-X. OCLC 250044448. (in Otomian languages and Spanish)
- Hekking, Ewald; Dik Bakker (2007). "The Case of Otomí: A contribution to grammatical borrowing in crosslinguistic perspective". In Yaron Matras; Jeanette Sakel (eds.). Grammatical Borrowing in Cross-Linguistic Perspective (online reproduction by publisher). Empirical Approaches to Language Typology [EALT], no 38. Berlin and New York: Mouton de Gruyter. pp. 435–464. doi:10.1515/9783110199192.435. ISBN 978-3-11-019628-3. OCLC 176648892.
- Lastra, Yolanda (2006). Los otomíes: su lengua y su historia (in Spanish). México, D.F.: Instituto de Investigaciones Antropológicas-UNAM. ISBN 978-970-32-3388-5.
- Lope Blanch; Juan M. (2004). Cuestiones de filología mexicana. Publicaciones del Centro de Lingüística Hispánica, no. 52 (in Spanish). México, D.F.: Instituto de Investigaciones Filológicas-UNAM. ISBN 970-32-0976-9. OCLC 56893165.
- Neve y Molina, L.D. Luis de (2005) [1767]. Erik Boot (ed.). Reglas de Orthographia, Diccionario, y Arte del Idioma Othomi (PDF) (in Spanish). Foundation for the Advancement of Mesoamerican Studies, Inc..
- Wright Carr; David Charles (2005). "Lengua, cultura e historia de los otomíes". Arqueología Mexicana (in Spanish). 13 (73). México, D.F.: Instituto Nacional de Antropología e Historia, Editorial Raíces: 26–29. ISSN 0188-8218. OCLC 29789840. Archived from the original (online version [repaginated from original]) on 2011-02-26.
