= Central Otomi =

Native American language of Mexico

- State of Mexico Otomi/San Felipe Otomi
- Native to: Mexico
- Region: State of Mexico, Michoacán
- Native speakers: 20,000 (2010)
- Language family: Oto-Manguean: Oto-Pamean; Otomian; Southwestern; Central Otomi
- Writing system: Latin

Language codes
- ISO 639-3: ots
- Glottolog: esta1236

Central Otomi (San Felipe Otomi and Otomi del estado de México) is a Native American language spoken by 10,000 in San Felipe Santiago and in several neighboring towns in the Mexican state of Mexico, such as Chapa de Mota and Jilotepec de Abasolo. Also called 'State of Mexico Otomi', there are other varieties spoken in the state, such as Temoaya Otomi. The autonym is Hñatho or Hñotho.

== Cited works ==
- Lastra, Yolanda (2006). Los Otomies – Su lengua y su historia (in Spanish). Universidad Nacional Autonoma de México, Instituto de investigaciones Antropológicas. ISBN 9789703233885.
- Wright Carr, David Charles (2005). "Precisiones sobre el término "otomí"" (PDF). Arqueología Mexicana (in Spanish). 13 (73): 19. Archived from the original (PDF) on November 8, 2005.
