= San Ildefonso, Hidalgo =

San Ildefonso, Hidalgo Chantepec (Nahuatl languages) Mangu (Otomian languages)
- Town
- Location in Mexico San Ildefonso, Hidalgo (Mexico)
- Coordinates: 19°57′N 98°55′W
- Country: Mexico
- State: Hidalgo

Population (2010)
  - Total: 4,423

San Ildefonso (Nahuatl languages: Chantepec and Otomi Mangu) is a town of Tepeji del Río municipality, in central-eastern Mexico. It is a town near to Tula de Allende city.

As of 2010, the town had a total population of 4,423. 90% of the people speak otomi language.
