= Hueytlalpan Otomi =

Oto-Manguean language of Mexico

- Santa Ana Hueytlalpan Otomi
- Native to: Mexico
- Region: Santa Ana Hueytlalpan, Hidalgo
- Language family: Oto-Manguean: Oto-Pamean; Otomian; Eastern; Hueytlalpan Otomi

Language codes
- ISO 639-3: None (mis)
- Glottolog: None

Santa Ana Hueytlalpan Otomi is a native American language spoken in Santa Ana Hueytlalpan town of Tulancingo de Bravo municipality of Hidalgo, Mexico. It has been classified as Eastern Otomi by Lastra (2006), but is not included in Ethnologue.

== Notes ==
- Lastra, Yolanda (2006). Los Otomies – Su lengua y su historia (in Spanish). Universidad Nacional Autonoma de México, Instituto de investigaciones Antropológicas. ISBN 9789703233885.
