= Jñatjo =

Jñatjo (from the Mazahua endonym Tetjo ñaa jñatjo, roughly meaning "those who speak their own language") may refer to:

- Mazahua people
- Mazahua language
