= Adela Calva Reyes =

Mexican writer, author and playwright (1957–2018)

Adela Calva
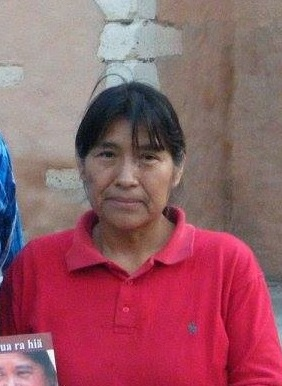
- Born: 1967 San Ildefonso, Mexico
- Died: 2 March 2018 (aged 50–51) Pachuca, Mexico
- Occupation: Author and playwright
- Genre: Otomi language poetry and prose

Adela Calva Reyes (1967 – 2 March 2018) was an indigenous Mexican writer, author and playwright of the Otomi people.

== Biography ==
Adela was born in 1967 in San Ildefonso, Tepejí del Río, State of Hidalgo. She remembered poverty in her childhood.

She died on 2 March 2018 in Pachuca, State of Hidalgo.

== Works ==
- Ra hua ra hiä Alas a la palabra (2008, Conaculta)

== See also ==
- Otomi language
