= Mazahua =

Mazahua may refer to:

- Mazahua people, an Indigenous people of Mexico
- Mazahua language, the Oto-Pamean language spoken by the Mazahua people
