= San Jerónimo Acazulco =

- Village
- Location in Mexico
- Coordinates: 19°16′00″N 99°25′00″W
- Country: Mexico
- State: Mexico
- Municipality: Ocoyoacac

Population (2010)
  - Total: 4,827
- Time zone: UTC-6 (Central Standard Time)
  - Summer (DST): UTC-5 (Central Daylight Time)

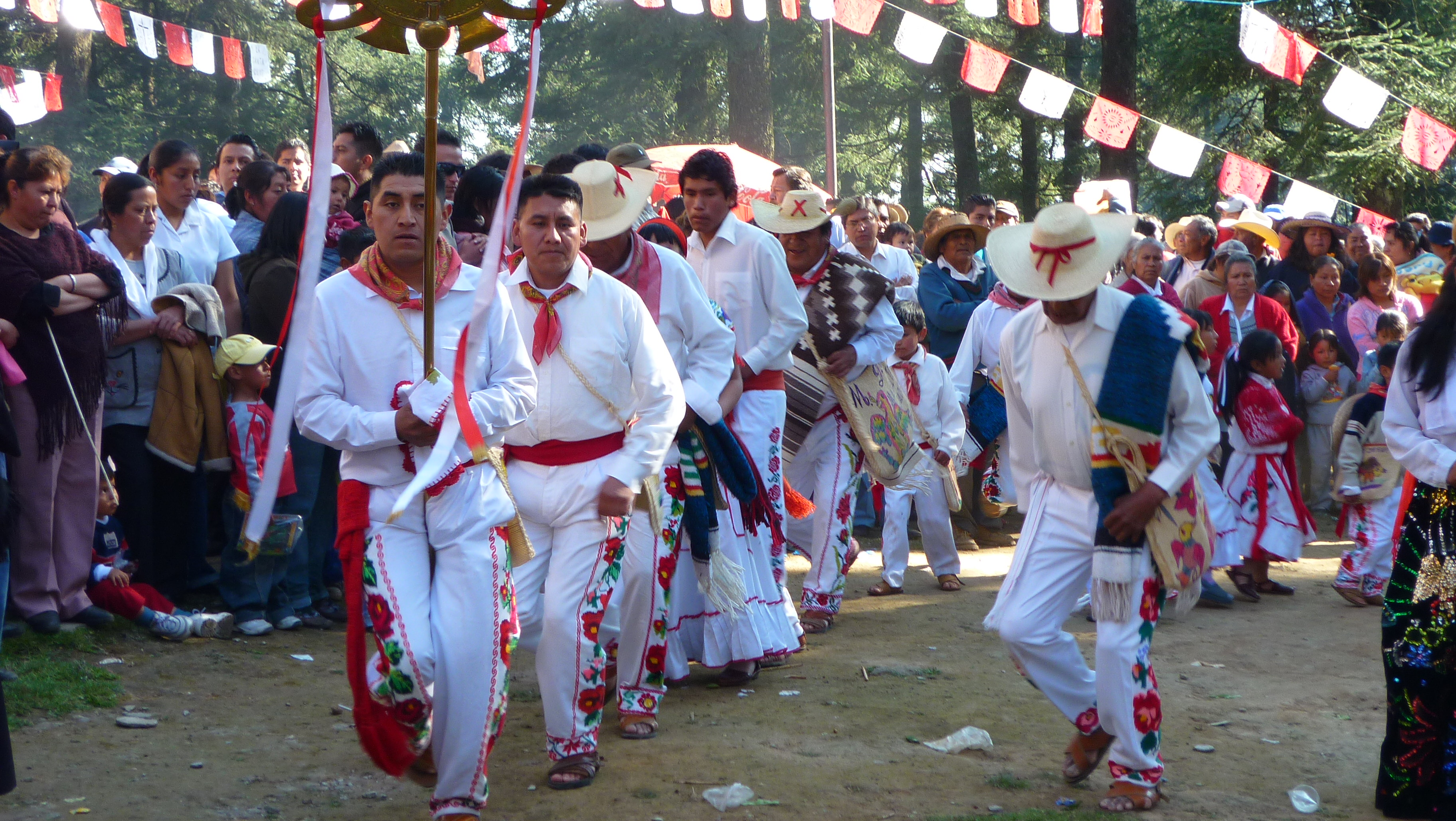
The Dance of the Arrieros a folk dance of the communities in the Toluca Valley performed during a celebration on the Cerro Hueyameluca outside of San Jerónimo Acazulco

San Jerónimo Acazulco is a town and community in the municipality of Ocoyoacac, Mexico State, Mexico. Once an agricultural community, the economy of the ejido is now primarily based on tourist commerce. It is within La Marquesa National Park.

The town is an indigenous community of the Otomi people, and most of the elderly still speak the Acazulco Otomi dialect of the Otomi language. In 2010 census there are 4,827 inhabitants.

The community has an active cargo system of religious fiestas, with leaders of its religious fraternities taking turns putting on public celebrations throughout the year.
