= La Marquesa National Park =

National park in Mexico

Coordinates: 19°17′N 99°21′W

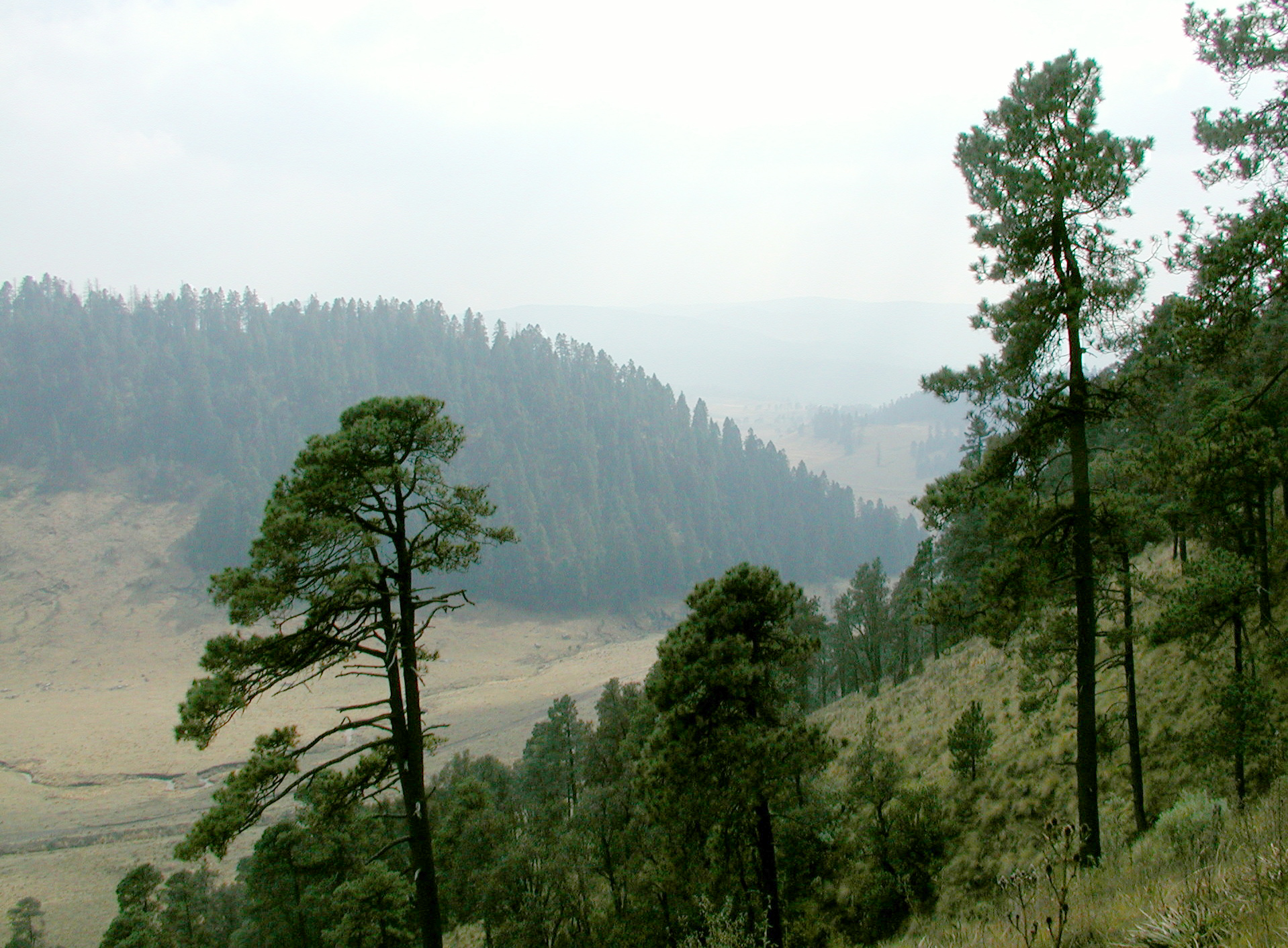
Landscape in La Marquesa National Park, with Hartweg's Pines (Pinus hartwegii), seen from a trail.

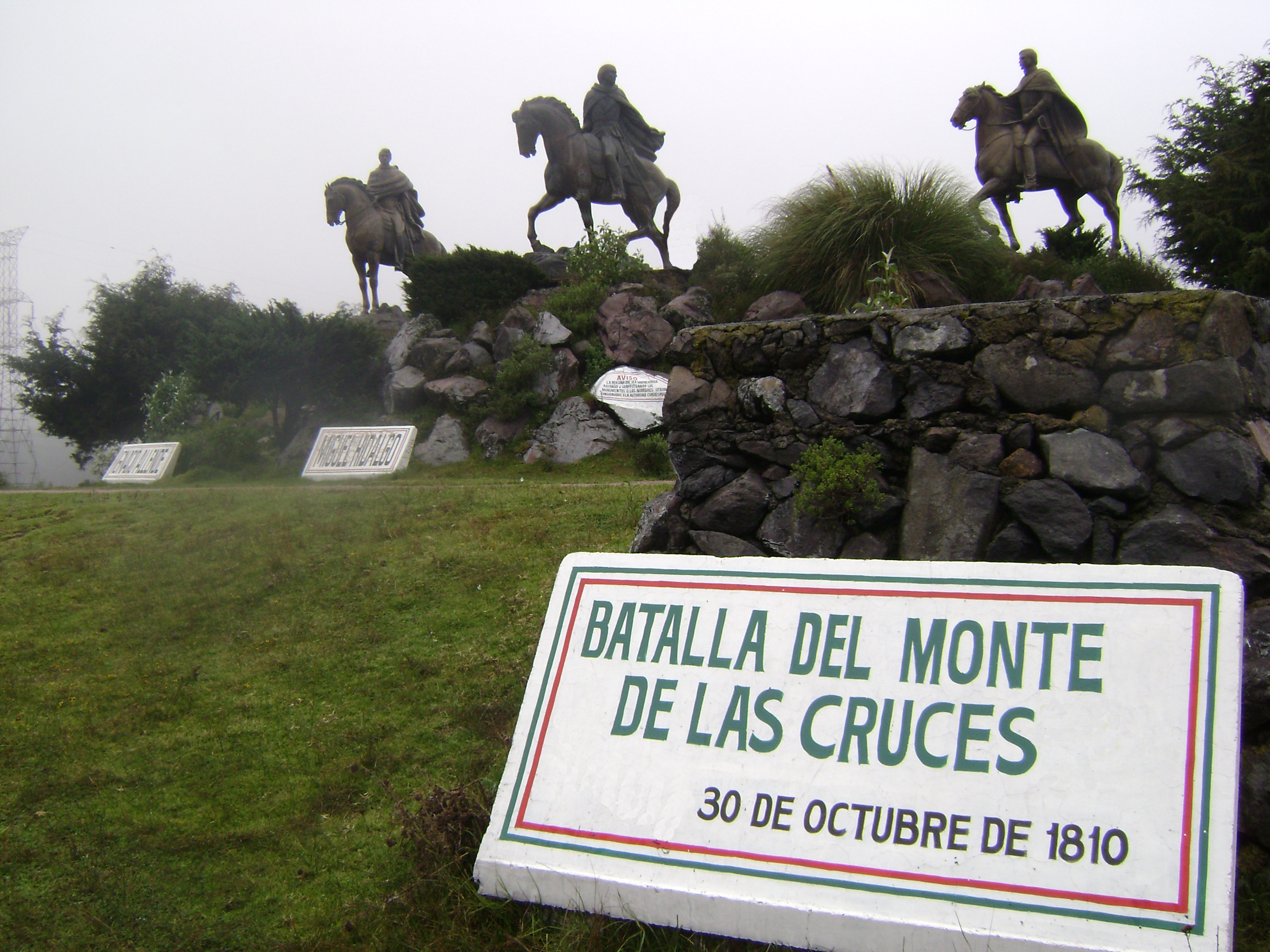
Statues of the heroes of the Battle of Monte de las Cruces, in the park.

La Marquesa National Park, with the official name Parque Nacional Insurgente Miguel Hidalgo y Costilla, is a National park in the State of Mexico, in central Mexico.

It commemorates the battlefield site of the 1810 Battle of Monte de las Cruces, one of the pivotal battles of the early Mexican War of Independence in New Spain.

== Geography ==
The park is situated west of Mexico City and east of Toluca, the capital of the State of Mexico. It is also west of the Desierto de los Leones National Park. Most of the park's forests are on the north side of the highway.

It is within the municipalities of Ocoyoacac, Huixquilucan, and Lerma de Villada in the State of Mexico, and also in the adjacent Cuajimalpa borough of the Mexico, D.F. (Mexico City).

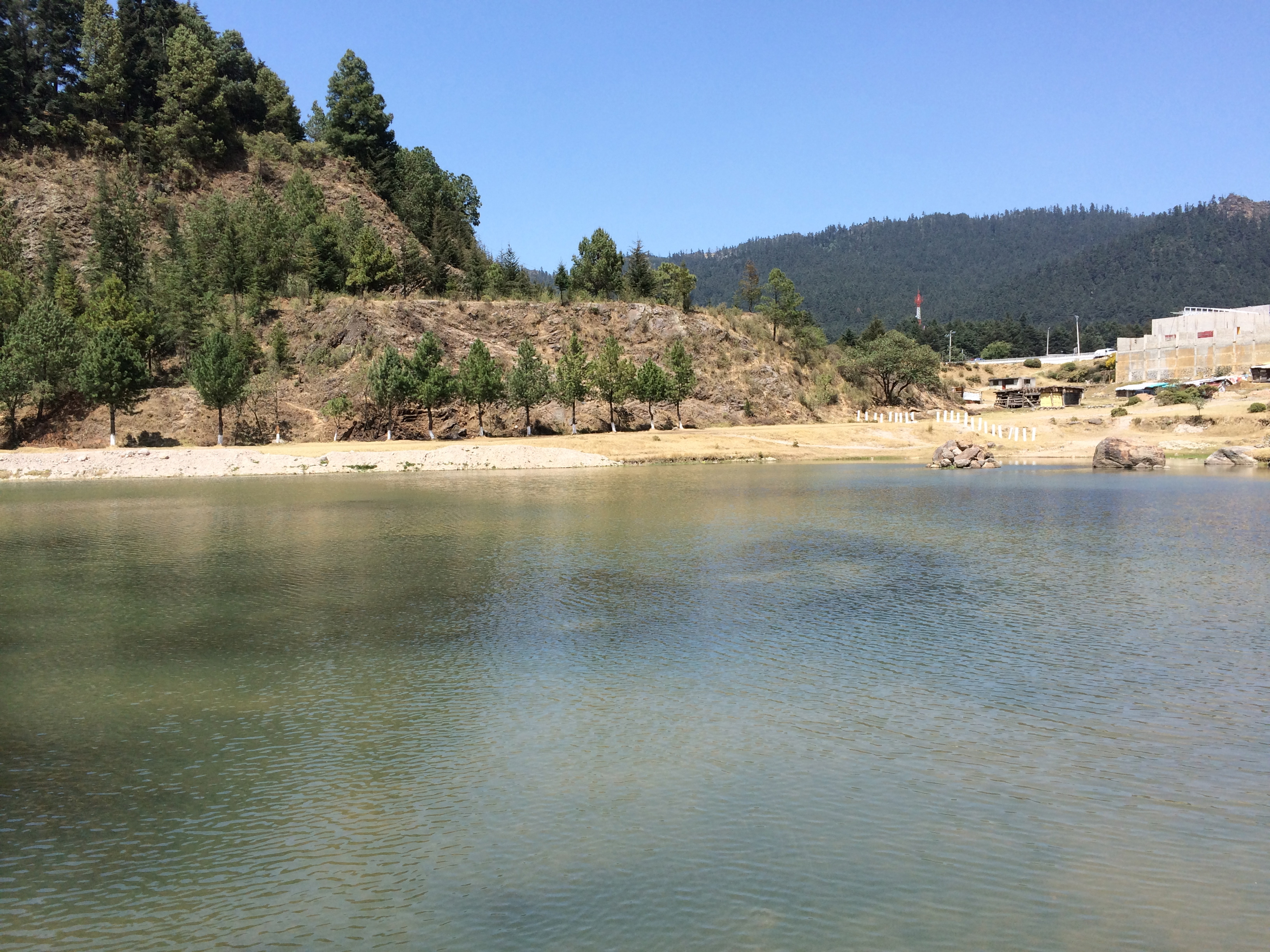
Marquesa Lake

== Features ==
The park has a Centro de Información Turistica visitor center, which is a trailhead for walking paths and forest trails. Horses are available for rent here. The Valley of Silence (Valle del Silencio) is another area in the park.

Near the village of La Marquesa are three large bronze statues of men on horseback looking east toward Mexico City. They are the national heroes Miguel Hidalgo, Ignacio Allende, and José Mariano Jiménez. The memorial commemorates the Battle of Monte de las Cruces, which took place here in October 1810. La Marquesa is in the ejido of San Jerónimo Acazulco, of the indigenous Otomí community.

== See also ==
- Protected areas of the State of Mexico
