= Tepeji =

Tepeji del Río de Ocampo Tepeji, Hidalgo
- Town and municipality
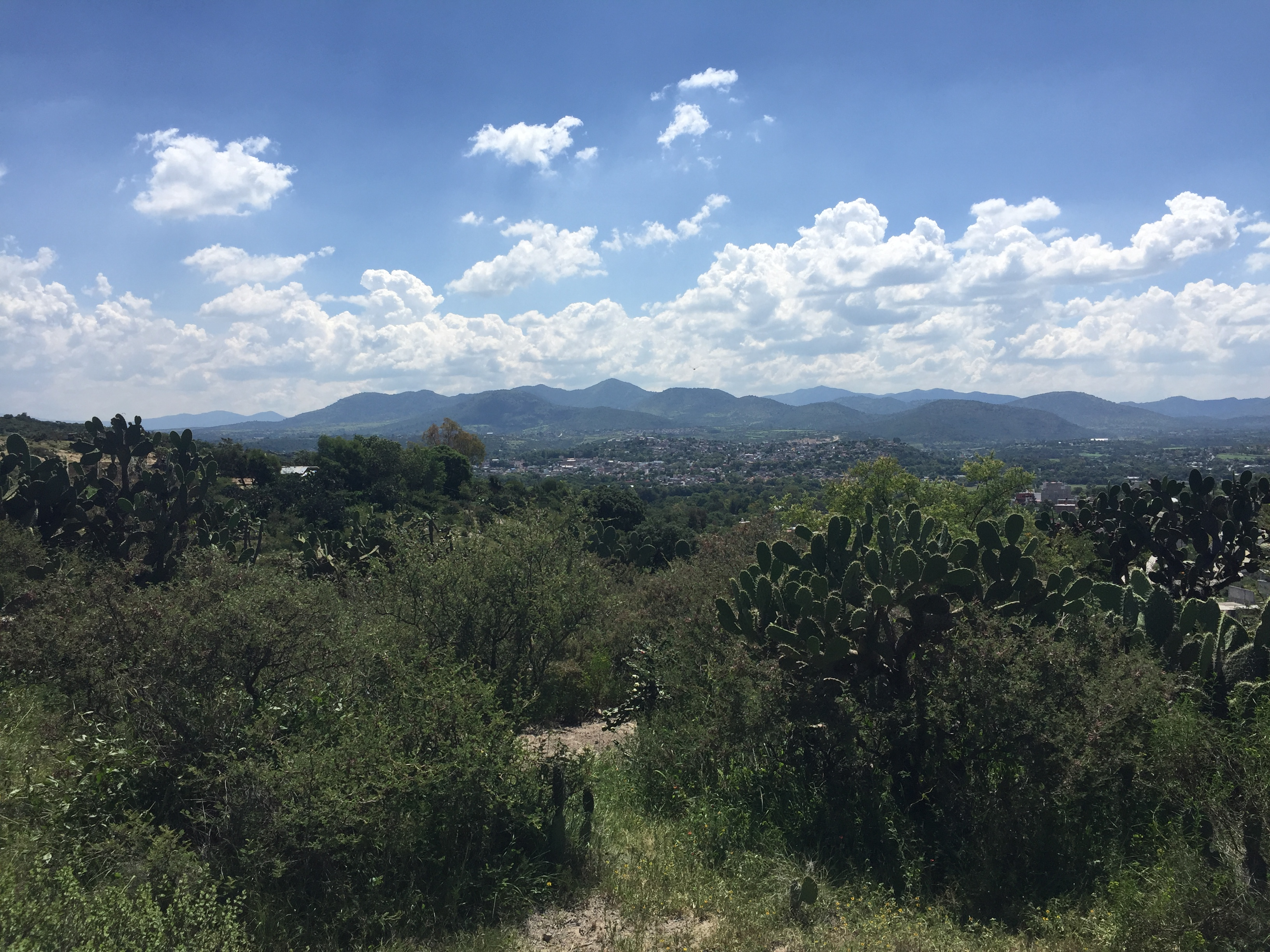

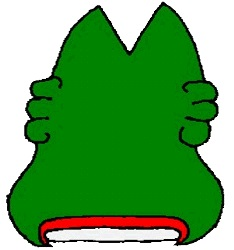
- Coat of arms

- Location within Hidalgo Location within Mexico
- Coordinates: 19°54′14″N 99°20′29″W
- Country: Mexico
- State: Hidalgo
- Municipality: Tepeji del Río de Ocampo

Government
  - Municipal President: Tania Valdez Cuéllar
  - Federal electoral district: Hidalgo's 5th

Area
  - Total: 393.4 km^{2} (151.9 sq mi)
- Elevation: 2,172 m (7,126 ft)

Population (2010)
  - Total: 80,612
  - Density: 204.9/km^{2} (530.7/sq mi)
- Time zone: UTC-6 (Zona Centro)
- Area code: 42850
- Website: tepejidelriohgo.gob.mx

Tepeji (officially: Tepeji del Río de Ocampo, for Melchor Ocampo) is one of the 84 municipalities of Hidalgo, in central-eastern Mexico. The municipality covers an area of 393.4 km^{2} (151.9 sq mi). The town is known for its valley landscape, with natural attractions such as Lake Requena, a vast lake surrounded by tall hills.

Tepeji del Rio has many industrial complexes with companies such as Beaver Manufacturing, Procter and Gamble, Kaltex, Arteche, Zaga, PPG and Pilgrims Pride. Amanali Country Club & Nautica has a golf course situated in the northern part of the town overlooking Lake Requena, along with associated residential areas. Plaza del Rio, Tepeji's main plaza, has most of the town's commercial outlets.

The 2010 census reported that the municipality had a total population of 80,612, though the welcome road sign at the south entrance of Tepeji states a population of 100,000. In contrast to the rapid urbanization of central Mexico, Tepeji sits just outside the Mexico City Metropolitan area. The town is also known for being the birthplace of Mexican footballer Raúl Jiménez.

As of 2024, Tepeji is governed by Tania Valdez Cuéllar, member of Morena.

== Demography ==
=== Populated places in Tepeji ===
Town	Population
Total	80,612
Tepeji del Río de Ocampo	45,430
San Ildefonso	1,248
San Buenaventura	3,949
Santiago Tlapanaloya	6,466
San Ignacio Nopala	1,689
