= Doris Bartholomew =

American linguist

- Born: December 14, 1930 (age 95)

Academic background
- Education: University of Chicago
- Thesis: The Reconstruction of Otopamean (Mexico) (1965)

Doris Aileen Bartholomew (born December 14, 1930) is an American linguist whose published research specialises in the lexicography, historical and descriptive linguistics for indigenous languages in Mexico, in particular for Oto-Manguean languages. Bartholomew's extensive publications on Mesoamerican languages span five decades of active research. She has also published extensively on Zapotecan languages and the Otomi language. She has been editor-in-chief and publications director for the Instituto Lingüístico de Verano (ILV), the affiliate body incorporated in Mexico for SIL International.

== Studies and academic career ==
As an undergraduate Bartholomew attended Columbia Bible College in Columbia, South Carolina, from where she graduated in 1952. Her doctorate studies were undertaken at the University of Chicago, obtaining her PhD in 1965. Her doctoral dissertation concerned the reconstruction and historical linguistics of the Oto-Pamean languages.

Bartholomew conducted linguistic fieldwork among several different indigenous Mexican language communities, while working as publications coordinator for ILV's bilingual dictionary unit. She also lectured part-time in linguistics at El Colegio de México.

== Partial bibliography ==
Bartholomew's published works include:

- Bartholomew, Doris (1960). "Some revisions of Proto-Otomi consonants". International Journal of American Linguistics. 26 (3): 317–329. doi:10.1086/464591. JSTOR 1263552. S2CID 144874022.
- Bartholomew, Doris (1968). "Concerning the Elimination of Nasalized Vowels in Mezquital Otomi". International Journal of American Linguistics. 34 (3): 215–217. doi:10.1086/465017. JSTOR 1263568. S2CID 143848950.
- Bartholomew, Doris (1963). "El limosnero y otros cuentos en otomí". Tlalocan (in Spanish). 4 (2): 120–24. doi:10.19130/iifl.tlalocan.1963.315.
- Bartholomew, Doris (1979). "Review of Otomi Parables, Folktales, and Jokes by H. Russell Bernard; Jesús Salinas Pedraza". International Journal of American Linguistics. 45 (1): 94–97. doi:10.1086/465579.
- Bartholomew, Doris (1963). The Reconstruction of Otopamean (Mexico) (PhD dissertation). University of Chicago.
