= Northwestern Otomi =

Mexican language

- Ñäñho; Hñahñu (Mezquital Otomi); Hñohño, Ñañhų, Hñąñhop, Ñǫthǫ (Querétaro Otomi)
- Native to: Mexico
- Region: Hidalgo, Querétaro, México
- Native speakers: (130,000 cited 1990 census)
- Language family: Oto-Manguean: Oto-Pamean; Otomian; Northwestern Otomi
- Writing system: Latin

Language codes
- ISO 639-3: Either: ote – Mezquital Otomi otq – Querétaro Otomi
- Glottolog: nort3201
- ELP: Mezquital Otomí

Northwestern Otomi is a Native American language of central Mexico.

== Varieties ==
There are two varieties with limited (c. 78%) intelligibility, sometimes considered separate languages:

- Mezquital Otomi (Otomí del Valle del Mezquital). The autonym is Hñahñu It is spoken in the state of Hidalgo, especially in the Mezquital Valley, by 100,000 people. There are also some migrant worker expatriates in the United States in the states of Texas (270), Oklahoma (230), and North Carolina (100). A dictionary and grammar of the language have been published.
- Querétaro Otomi. The autonym varies as Hñohño, Ñañhų, Hñąñho, Ñǫthǫ. It is spoken by 33,000 in the Querétaro municipalities of Amealco de Bonfil (towns of San Ildefonso and Santiago Mexquititlán); in Mexico State, the town of Acambay, and in Querétaro, the town of Tolimán, and in Michoacan, the town of San Felipe los Alzatí. There are also small numbers in the state of Guanajuato.

== Cited works ==
- Lastra, Yolanda (2006). Los Otomies – Su lengua y su historia (in Spanish). Universidad Nacional Autonoma de México, Instituto de investigaciones Antropológicas. ISBN 9789703233885.
- Wright Carr, David Charles (2005). "Precisiones sobre el término "otomí"" (PDF). Arqueología Mexicana (in Spanish). 13 (73): 19. Archived from the original (PDF) on November 8, 2005.
