= Temoaya Otomi =

Language from Mexico

- Toluca Otomí, Otomi de San Andrés Cuexcontitlan
- Ñatho
- Region: Mexico:Mexico state
- Native speakers: (37,000 cited 1990 census)
- Language family: Oto-Manguean: Oto-Pamean; Otomian; Southwestern; Temoaya Otomi
- Dialects: Temoaya; Toluca

Official status
- Regulated by: Secretaría de Educación Pública

Language codes
- ISO 639-3: ott
- Glottolog: temo1245

Temoaya Otomi, also known as Toluca Otomi or Otomi of San Andrés Cuexcontitlan, is a variety of the Otomi language spoken in Mexico by ca. 37,000 people in and around the municipality of Temoaya, and in three communities within the municipality of Toluca: San Andrés Cuexcontitlán, San Pablo Autopan and San Cristobal Huichochitlan. The two varieties are quite different. The speakers themselves call the language Ñatho. Lastra (2001) classifies it as a southwestern dialect along with the dialects of Mexico state. Lastra also notes that the endangered Otomí dialect of San Felipe in eastern Michoacán is most similar to the Otomí spoken in San Andrés Cuexcontitlan.

== Grammar ==
=== Pronominal system ===
The pronominal system of Toluca Otomi distinguish four persons: 1st inclusive and exclusive, second and third and three numbers singular, dual and plural.

	Singular	Dual	Plural
1st person Incl.	*	nugó-bé "you and I"	nugó-hé "I and you guys"
1st Person Excl.	nugó "I"	nugó-wí "we two (not you)"	nugó-hɨ´ "We all (not you)"
2nd Person	nukʔígé "you"	nukʔígé-wí "you two"	nukʔígé-gɨ´ "you guys"
3rd Person	gégé "she/he/it"	nugégé-wí "the two of them"	nugégé-hɨ´ "they"

=== Nouns ===
Otomi nouns are inflected for possession. The particular pattern of possessive inflection is widespread throughout the Mesoamerican Linguistic Area. A possessed noun is prefixed with a morpheme agreeing in person with the possessor. If the possessor is plural or dual the nouns is also marked with a suffix agreeing with the possessor's number. Below is given the inflectional paradigm for the word /ngų´/ "house".

	Singular	Dual	Plural
1st person Excl.	*	mą-ngų´-bé "Our house (me and him/her)"	mą-ngų´-hé "Our house (me and them)"
1st Person Incl.	mą-ngų´ "my house"	mą-ngų´-wí "Our house (me and you)"	mą-ngų´-hɨ´ "Our house (me and you and them)"
2nd Person	ri-ngų´ "your house"	ri-ngų´-wí "you two's house"	ri-ngų´-hɨ´ "you guys' house"
3rd Person	rʌ-ngų´ "her/his/its house"	yʌ-ngų´-wí "the house of the two of them"	yʌ-ngų´-hɨ´ "their house"

==== Articles ====
Plurality of nouns is expressed with articles preceding the noun, rʌ "the (singular)" or yʌ "the (dual/plural)":

Singular	Dual	Plural
rʌ ngų´ "the house"	yʌ yóho ngų´ "the two houses"	yʌ ngų´ "the houses"

=== Verbs ===
On verbs all of the categories of person of subject, tense, aspect and mood are marked by the means of a single prefix on each verb. The categories distinguished are Present, Preterit, Perfect, Imperfect, Future, Pluperfect, two different Subjunctives, present and past Continuative and Imperative. On transitive verbs Person of object is inflected by a suffix. If either subject or object is dual or plural it is shown with a plural suffix following the object suffix.

The structure of the Otomi verb is as follows:

Person of Subject/T/A/M	Misc. prefix (e.g. adverbial)	Root	Object suffix	Plural/Dual suffix

==== Person, Number, Tense, Aspect and Mood ====
The present tense prefixes are di- (1st person), gi- (2nd person), i- (3rd person).

	Singular	Dual	Plural
1st person Excl.	*	di-nú-bé "we see (me and him/her)"	di-nú-hé "we see (me and them)"
1st Person Incl.	di-nú "I see"	di-nú-wí "We see(me and you)"	mdi-nú-hɨ´ "We see (me and you and them)"
2nd Person	gi-nú "you see"	gi-nú-wí "You two see"	gi-nú-hɨ´ "You guys see"
3rd Person	gi-nú "she/he/it sees"	gi-nú-wí "the two of them see"	gi-nú-hɨ´ "they see"

The preterite uses the prefixes do-, go- and bi-, perfect uses to-, ko-, ʃi-, imperfect uses dimá, gimá, mi, future uses go-, gi- and da- and pluperfect tamą-, kimą-, kamą-. All tenses use the same suffixes for dual and plural numbers and clusivity as the present tense, from here on only the singular forms will be given. The difference between preterit and imperfect is similar to the distinction between the preterit in Spanish habló "he spoke (punctual)" and the imperfect hablaba "he spoke/He used to speak/he was speaking (non-punctual)".

	Preterite	Perfect	Imperfect	Future Tense	Pluperfect
1st Person singular	do-nú "I saw (punctual)"	to-nú "I have seen"	dimá-nú "I saw (non-punctual)"	go-nú "I will see"	tamą-nú "I had seen"
2nd Person singular	go-nú "you saw (punctual)"	ko-nú "you have seen"	gimá-nú "you saw (non-punctual)"	gi-nú "you will see"	kimą-nú "you had seen"
3rd Person Singular	bi-nú "she/he/it saw (punctual)"	ʃi-nú "she/he/it has seen"	mi-nú "you saw (non-punctual)"	da-nú "She/he/it will see"	kamą-nú "she/he/it had seen"

In Toluca Otomi the semantic difference between the two subjunctive forms (A and B) are not easily defined according to Lastra sometimes Subjunctive B has a meaning that is more recent in time than Subjunctive A. Both have the meaning of something counterfactual. The past and present progressive are similar in meaning to English was and is X-ing respectively. The imperative is for issuing direct orders.

	Subjunctive A	Subjunctive B	Present progressive	Past Progressive	Imperative
1st Person singular	(n)gwa-nú "I would have seen"	kwa-nú "I would have seen"	drʌ-nú "I am seeing"	ndrʌ-nú "I was seeing"	*
2nd Person singular	(n)gwi-nú "you would have seen"	kwi-nú "you would have seen"	grʌ-nú "you are seeing"	dgrʌ-nú "you were seeing"	nú "See!"
3rd Person Singular	(n)di-nú "she/he/it would have seen"	trʌ-nú "she/he/it would have seen"	rʌ-nú "she/he/it is seeing"	mbrʌ-nú "She(he/it was seeing"	*

Verbs expressing movement towards the speaker such as ʔįhį "come" use a different set of prefixes for marking person/T/A/M. These prefixes can also be used with other verbs to express "to do something while coming this way". In Toluca Otomi mba- is the third person singular imperfect prefix for movement verbs.

mba-tųhų
3/MVMT/IMPERF-sing
"he came singing"

To form predicates from nouns the subject prefixes are simply added to the noun root:

drʌ-môkhá
I/PRES/CONT-priest
"I am a priest"

==== Transitivity and stative verbs ====
Transitive verbs are inflected for agreement with their objects by means of suffixes, while using the same agent prefixes as the intransitive verbs to agree with their arguments. However in all dialects a few intransitive verbs take the object suffix instead of the agent prefix, usually these intransitive verbs are stative, i.e. describing a state. This has led to the interpretation that in Otomi morphosyntactic alignment is split between active–stative and accusative systems.

In Toluca Otomi the object suffixes are -gí (1st person), -kʔí (2nd person) and -bi (3rd person), but the vowel /i/ may harmonize to /e/ when suffix to a root containing /e/. The first person suffix has is realized as -kí after sibilants and after certain verb roots, and -hkí when used with certain other verbs. The 2nd person object suffix may sometimes metathesise to -ʔkí.The third person suffix also has the allomorphs -hpí/-hpé, -pí, -bí, and sometimes 3rd person objects is marked with a zero morpheme.

1st person object	2nd person object	3rd person object
bi-ñús-kí he/PAST-write-me "he wrote me"	bi-ñús-kʔí he/PAST-write-you "he wrote you"	bi-kré-bi he/PAST-believe-it "he believed it"
bi-nú-gí he/PAST-see-me "he saw me"	bi-nú-kʔí he/PAST-see-you "he saw you"	bi-hkwáhti-bí he/she/PAST-hit-him/her "she/he hit him/her"

Plural and dual number of object is marked by the same suffixes as the subject, in some cases leading to ambiguity about the respective numbers of subject and object. With object suffixes of the first or second person some times the verbal root changes, often dropping final vowels.

dual object/subject	plural object/subject
bi-ñaʃ-kʔí-wí he/PAST-cut.hair-you-DU "the two of them cut your hair" or "he cut the hair of the two of you"	bi-ñaʃ-kí-hɨ´ he/PAST-cut.hair-you-PL "they cut my hair" or "he cut our hair"

A class of words that describe properties or states have been described either as adjectives or as stative verbs. This wordclass consists of words with a meaning of attributing a property to an entity, e.g. "the man is tall", "the house is old". Within this class some roots use the normal subject/T/A/M prefixes, while others always use the object suffixes to encode the person of the patient/subject. The fact that they use the same suffixes that are used to encode the patient/objects of transitive verbs to encode the patient/subject of the predicate has been interpreted as a trait of Split intransitivity. This phenomenon occurs in all dialects, but which Stative verbs the object prefixes, and how many take, vary between dialects. In Toluca Otomi most stative verbs are conjugated using a set of suffixes similar to the object/patient suffixes and a third person subject prefix, while only a few use the present continuative subject prefixes. The following examples of the two kinds of stative verb conjugation in Toluca Otomi.

with patient/object suffix	with subject/agent prefix
rʌ-nô-hkʔí it/PRES-fat-me "I am fat"	drʌ-dôtʔî I/PRES/CONT-short "I am short"

==== Other affixes ====
Temoaya Otomi also allow different kinds of adverbial meanings to be inflected on the verb.

From Toluca Otomi examples of adverbial affixes are:

- bí- An evidential prefix used about progressive events being witnessed by the speaker (It only exists in third person singular):

kʔʌ rʌ ʃùa ya bì-pɛphí
IND the Juán now bí-work
"Juan is working now (I see)"

- ga- A prefix expressing two simultaneous events or one event immediately preceding another. Also has the second person ngo-:

bɨ ga-thô rʌ-tá mbrʌ-mí-thó
when ga-pass.by {} 3/PAST/CONT-sit-COMPL
"When his father came by he was already sitting"

- ndɨ- A prefix expressing that something was done well or a lot:

do-ndɨ-chú
1/PERF-ndɨ-scared
"I got really scared"

Other affixes express inchoative aspect, instrumental function or purpose. There is also a suffix meaning "meanwhile"
