= Ocoyoacac =

- Municipality
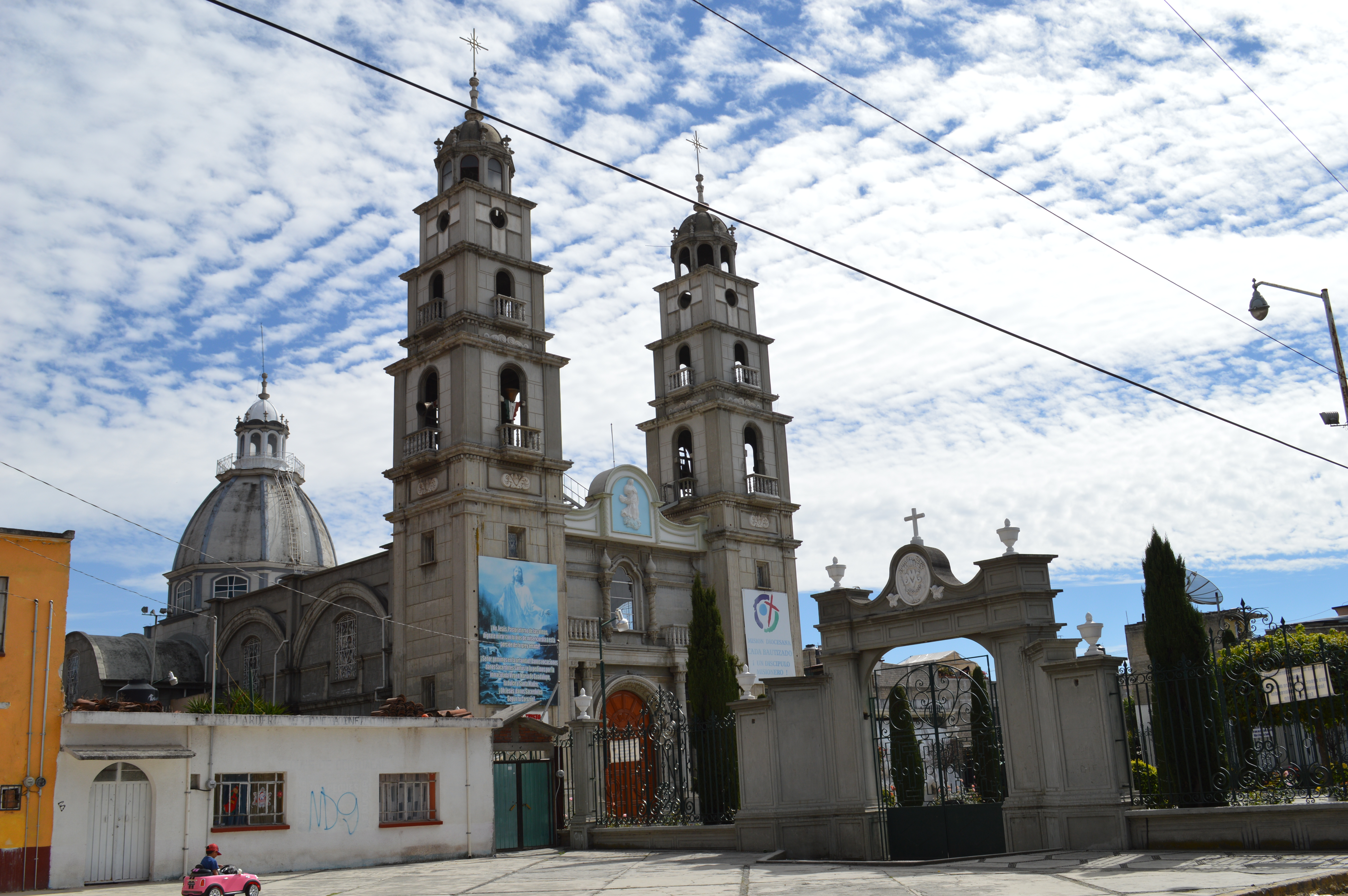
- Santa Maria Church in Ocoyoacac

- Coat of arms

- Location in Mexico
- Coordinates: 19°16′26″N 99°27′38″W
- Country: Mexico
- State: Mexico
- Municipal Seat: Ocoyoacac

Area
  - Municipality: 134.71 km^{2} (52.01 sq mi)
- Elevation at seat: 2,620 m (8,600 ft)

Population (2010)
  - Municipality: 61,805
  - Urban: 48,605
- Time zone: UTC-6 (Central Standard Time)

Ocoyoacac is a municipality in the State of Mexico in Mexico. The municipal seat is the town of Ocoyoacac. The municipality covers an area of 134.71 km^{2} (52.01 sq mi). It is one of the 17 municipalities that border Mexico City. It borders the Distrito Federal's western borough of Cuajimalpa.

As of the 2010 census, the municipality had a total population of 61,805 inhabitants.

== Towns and Villages ==
The largest localities (cities, towns, and villages) are:

Name	2010 Census Population
Ocoyoacac	26,015
San Pedro Cholula	8,941
San Jerónimo Acazulco	4,827
El Pedregal de Guadalupe Hidalgo	4,534
San Pedro Atlapulco	4,288
Colonia Juárez (Los Chirinos)	1,300
El Llano del Compromiso	1,174
Loma Bonita	1,146
Colonia el Pirame	1,144
San Antonio el Llanito	1,102
La Marquesa	981
Loma de los Esquiveles	923
Total Municipality	61,805

== See also ==
- La Marquesa National Park
