= Ixtenco Otomi =

Oto-Manguean language of Tlaxcala, Mexico

- Tlaxcala Otomi
- Yųhmų
- Native to: Mexico
- Region: Tlaxcala
- Ethnicity: 5,360 (1990 census)
- Native speakers: (460 cited 2000)
- Language family: Oto-Manguean: Oto-Pamean; Otomian; Eastern; Ixtenco Otomi
- Writing system: Latin

Language codes
- ISO 639-3: otz
- Glottolog: ixte1237
- ELP: Ixtenco Otomí

Ixtenco Otomi, also known as Tlaxcala Otomi, is a native American language spoken in the town of San Juan Bautista Ixtenco in the state of Tlaxcala, Mexico. It has been classified as Eastern Otomi by Lastra (2006). Lastra considers Ixtenco Otomí to be a very conservative dialect.

In Tlaxcala, Otomí was also formerly spoken in nearby Huamantla, located to the north (Carrasco 1950). To the east, it was spoken in Nopalucan, San Salvador el Seco, and Cuapiaxtla. Some families from Ixtenco have migrated to Máximo Serdán in Rafael Lara Grajales, Puebla (Lastra 1998).

== Sources ==
- Lastra, Yolanda. 1998. Ixtenco Otomi. Munich: LINCOM EUROPA.
- Lastra, Yolanda (2006). Los Otomies – Su lengua y su historia (in Spanish). Universidad Nacional Autonoma de México, Instituto de investigaciones Antropológicas. ISBN 9789703233885.
