= Tilapa Otomi =

Oto-Manguean language of Mexico

- Ñųhų
- Native to: Mexico
- Region: Santiago Tilapa
- Native speakers: 100 (2006)
- Language family: Oto-Manguean: Oto-Pamean; Otomian; Eastern; Tilapa Otomi
- Writing system: Latin

Language codes
- ISO 639-3: otl
- Glottolog: tila1239
- ELP: Tilapa Otomí

Tilapa Otomi is a seriously endangered native American language spoken by less than a dozen people in the village of Santiago Tilapa, between Toluca and the DF in Mexico State. It has been classified as Eastern Otomi by Lastra (2006). but in reality "Eastern Otomi" in Lastra's classification is a broader term for a "conservative variety". It is a language closely related to Acazulco and Atlapulco Otomi. It also shows a number of idiosyncratic innovations which make it stand as a different language, probably the closest one to Colonial Otomi. Its system of verbal conjugations is highly complex compared to the Mezquital varieties.
