= Otomi language =

Oto-Pamean language family of south-central Mexico

Otomi
- Hñähñu, Hpyurta, Ñätho, Ñäñho, Ñ'yühü, Hñotho, Hñähü, Hñätho, Yųhų, Yųhmų, Ñųhų, Ñǫthǫ, Ñañhų
- Pronunciation: [hɲɑ̃hɲṹ]
- Native to: Mexico
- Region: México (state), Puebla, Veracruz, Hidalgo, Guanajuato, Querétaro, Tlaxcala, Michoacán
- Ethnicity: Otomi
- Native speakers: 300,000 (2020 census)
- Language family: Oto-Manguean: Oto-Pamean; Otomian; Otomi

Official status
- Official language in: In Mexico through the General Law of Linguistic Rights of Indigenous Peoples (in Spanish).
- Regulated by: Instituto Nacional de Lenguas Indígenas

Language codes
- ISO 639-2: oto
- ISO 639-3: Variously: ote – Mezquital Otomi otl – Tilapa Otomi otm – Highland Otomi otn – Tenango Otomi otq – Querétaro Otomi ots – Estado de México Otomi ott – Temoaya Otomi otx – Texcatepec Otomi otz – Ixtenco Otomi
- Glottolog: otom1300 Otomi sout3168 Southwestern Otomi
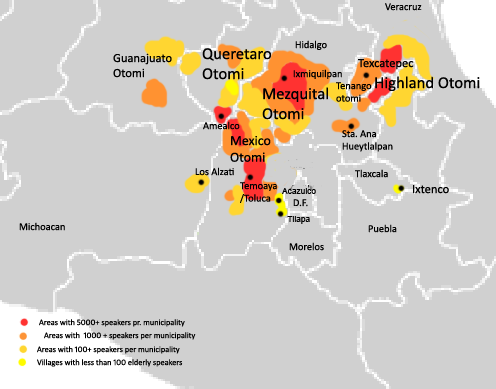
- Otomi-speaking areas in Mexico

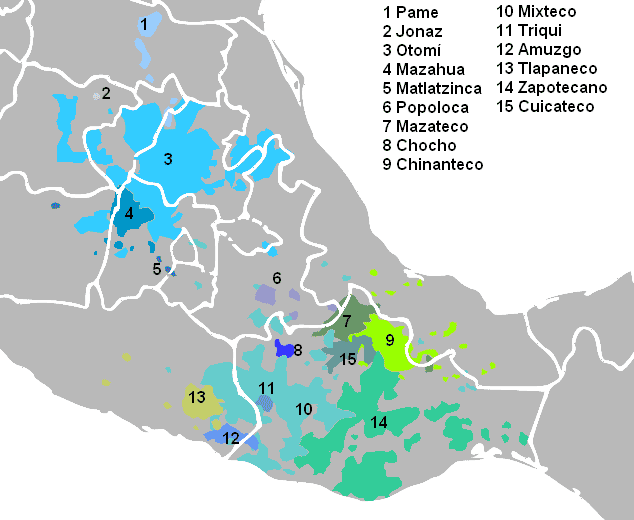
- The Otomi languages within Oto-Manguean, number 3 (bright blue), north

Lower Northwestern Otomí, Northwestern Otomí and Sierra Otomí are classified as Vulnerable by the UNESCO Atlas of the World's Languages in Danger.

Central Otomí and Mezquital Otomí are classified as Definitely Endangered by the UNESCO Atlas of the World's Languages in Danger.

Ixtenco Otomí, Ocoyoacac Otomí, Tilapa Otomí and Western Otomí are classified as Severely Endangered by the UNESCO Atlas of the World's Languages in Danger.

A Mezquital Otomi speaker.

Otomi (/ˌoʊtəˈmiː/ OH-tə-MEE; Spanish: Otomí [otoˈmi]) is an Oto-Pamean language spoken by approximately 240,000 indigenous Otomi people in the central altiplano region of Mexico. Otomi consists of several closely related languages, many of which are not mutually intelligible. The word Hñähñu [hɲɑ̃hɲṹ] has been proposed as an endonym, but since it represents the usage of a single dialect, it has not gained wide currency. Linguists have classified the modern dialects into three dialect areas: the Northwestern dialects are spoken in Querétaro, Hidalgo and Guanajuato; the Southwestern dialects are spoken in the State of Mexico; and the Eastern dialects are spoken in the highlands of Veracruz, Puebla, and eastern Hidalgo and villages in Tlaxcala and Mexico states.

Like all other Oto-Manguean languages, Otomi is a tonal language, and most varieties distinguish three tones. Nouns are marked only for possessor; the plural number is marked with a definite article and a verbal suffix, and some dialects keep dual number marking. There is no case marking. Verb morphology is either fusional or agglutinating depending on the analysis. (Note: Palancar (2009:14): "Desde un punto de vista de la tipología morfológica clásica greenbergiana el otomí es una lengua fusional que se convertiría, por otro lado en aglutinante si todos los clíticos se reanalizaran como afijos (From the point of view of the classic Greenbergian morphological typologogy, Otomí is a fusional language which would however turn into an agglutinating one if all the clitics were reanalyzed as affixes)") In verb inflection, infixation, consonant mutation, and apocope are prominent processes. The number of irregular verbs is large. A class of morphemes cross-references the grammatical subject in a sentence. These morphemes can be analysed as either proclitics or prefixes and mark tense, aspect and mood. Verbs are inflected for either direct object or dative object (but not for both simultaneously) by suffixes. Grammar also distinguishes between inclusive 'we' and exclusive 'we'.

After the Spanish conquest, Otomi became a written language when friars taught the Otomi to write the language using the Latin script; colonial period's written language is often called Classical Otomi. Several codices and grammars were composed in Classical Otomi. A negative stereotype of the Otomi promoted by the Nahuas and perpetuated by the Spanish resulted in a loss of status for the Otomi, who began to abandon their language in favor of Spanish. The attitude of the larger world toward the Otomi language started to change in 2003 when Otomi was granted recognition as a national language under Mexican law together with 61 other indigenous languages.

== Name ==
Otomi comes from the Nahuatl word otomitl, which in turn possibly derived from an older word, totomitl "shooter of birds." It is an exonym; the Otomi refer to their language as Hñähñú, Hñähño, Hñotho, Hñähü, Hñätho, Hyųhų, Yųhmų, Ñųhų, Ñǫthǫ, or Ñañhų, depending on the dialect. (Note: See the individual articles for the forms used in each dialect.) Most of those forms are composed of two morphemes, meaning "speak" and "well" respectively.

The word Otomi entered the Spanish language through Nahuatl and describes the larger Otomi macroethnic group and the dialect continuum. From Spanish, the word Otomi has become entrenched in the linguistic and anthropological literature. Among linguists, the suggestion has been made to change the academic designation from Otomi to Hñähñú, the endonym used by the Otomi of the Mezquital Valley; however, no common endonym exists for all dialects of the language.

== History ==
=== Proto-Otomi period and later precolonial period ===
The Oto-Pamean languages are thought to have split from the other Oto-Manguean languages around 3500 BC. Within the Otomian branch, Proto-Otomi seems to have split from Proto-Mazahua c. 500 AD. Around 1000 AD, Proto-Otomi began diversifying into the modern Otomi varieties. Much of central Mexico was inhabited by speakers of the Oto-Pamean languages before the arrival of Nahuatl speakers; beyond this, the geographical distribution of the ancestral stages of most modern indigenous languages of Mexico, and their associations with various civilizations remain undetermined. It has been proposed that Proto-Otomi-Mazahua most likely was one of the languages spoken in Teotihuacan, the greatest Mesoamerican ceremonial center of the Classic period, the demise of which occurred c. 600 AD.

The Precolumbian Otomi people did not have a fully developed writing system. However, Aztec writing, largely ideographic, could be read in Otomi as well as Nahuatl. The Otomi often translated names of places or rulers into Otomi rather than using the Nahuatl names. For example, the Nahuatl place name Tenochtitlān, "place of Opuntia cactus", was rendered as *ʔmpôndo in proto-Otomi, with the same meaning. (Note: In most modern varieties of Otomi the name for "Mexico" has changed to ʔmôndo (in Ixtenco Otomi) or ʔmóndá (in Mezquital Otomi). In some varieties of Highland Otomi it is mbôndo. Only Tilapa Otomi and Acazulco Otomi preserve the original pronunciation (Lastra, 2006:47).)

=== Colonial period and Classical Otomi ===
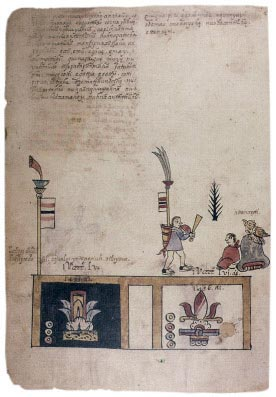
Page written in 16th century Otomi from the Codex Huichapan

At the time of the Spanish conquest of central Mexico, Otomi had a much wider distribution than now, with sizeable Otomi speaking areas existing in the modern states of Jalisco (see Otomi language (Jalisco)) and Michoacán. After the conquest, the Otomi people experienced a period of geographical expansion as the Spaniards employed Otomi warriors in their expeditions of conquest into northern Mexico. During and after the Mixtón rebellion, in which Otomi warriors fought for the Spanish, Otomis settled areas in Querétaro (where they founded the city of Querétaro) and Guanajuato which previously had been inhabited by nomadic Chichimecs. Because Spanish colonial historians such as Bernardino de Sahagún used primarily Nahua speakers primarily as sources for their histories of the colony, the Nahuas' negative image of the Otomi people was perpetuated throughout the colonial period. This tendency towards devaluing and stigmatizing the Otomi cultural identity relative to other Indigenous groups gave impetus to the process of language loss and mestizaje, as many Otomies opted to adopt the Spanish language and customs in search of social mobility.

"Classical Otomi" is the term used to define the Otomi spoken in the early centuries of colonial rule. This historical stage of the language was given Latin orthography and documented by Spanish friars who learned it in order to proselytize among the Otomi. Text in Classical Otomi is not readily comprehensible since the Spanish-speaking friars failed to differentiate the varied vowel and consonant phonemes used in Otomi. Friars and monks from the Spanish mendicant orders such as the Franciscans wrote Otomi grammars, the earliest of which is Friar Pedro de Cárceres's Arte de la lengua othomí [sic], written perhaps as early as 1580, but not published until 1907. In 1605, Alonso de Urbano wrote a trilingual Spanish-Nahuatl-Otomi dictionary, which included a small set of grammatical notes about Otomi. The grammarian of Nahuatl, Horacio Carochi, has written a grammar of Otomi, but no copies have survived. He is the author of an anonymous dictionary of Otomi (manuscript 1640). In the latter half of the eighteenth century, an anonymous Jesuit priest wrote the grammar Luces del Otomi (which is, strictly speaking, not a grammar but a report on research about Otomi). Neve y Molina wrote a dictionary and a grammar.

During the colonial period, many Otomis learned to read and write their language. Consequently, a significant number of Otomi documents exist from the period, both secular and religious, the most well-known of which are the Codices of Huichapan and Jilotepec. (Note: The Huichapan Codex is reproduced and translated in Lastra & Bartholomew (2001).) In the late colonial period and after independence, indigenous groups no longer had separate status. At that time, Otomi lost its status as a language of education, ending Classical Otomi period as a literary language. This led to a declining numbers of speakers of indigenous languages, as Indigenous groups throughout Mexico adopted the Spanish language and Mestizo cultural identities. Coupled with a policy of castellanización this led to a rapid decline of speakers of all indigenous languages including Otomi, during the early 20th century.

=== Contemporary status ===
Speakers of Otomi over 5 years of age in the ten Mexican states with most speakers (2005 census)
Region	Count	Percentage (Note: Percentages given are in comparison to the total Otomi speaking population.)
Mexico City	12,460	5.2%
Querétaro	18,933	8.0%
Hidalgo	95,057	39.7%
Mexico (state)	83,362	34.9%
Jalisco	1,089	0.5%
Guanajuato	721	0.32%
Puebla	7,253	3.0%
Michoacán	480	0.2%
Nuevo León	1,126	0.5%
Veracruz	16,822	7.0%
Rest of Mexico	2,537	1.20%
Total:	239,850	100%

During the 1990s, however, the Mexican government made a reversal in policies towards indigenous and linguistic rights, prompted by the 1996 adoption of the Universal Declaration of Linguistic Rights (Note: Adopted at a world linguistics conference in Barcelona, it "became a general reference point for the evolution and discussion of linguistic rights in Mexico" Pellicer, Cifuentes & Herrera (2006:132)) and domestic social and political agitation by various groups such as social and political agitation by the EZLN and indigenous social movements. Decentralized government agencies were created and charged with promoting and protecting indigenous communities and languages; these include the National Commission for the Development of Indigenous Peoples (CDI) and the National Institute of Indigenous Languages (INALI). In particular, the federal Ley General de Derechos Lingüísticos de los Pueblos Indígenas ("General Law on the Language Rights of the Indigenous Peoples"), promulgated on 13 March 2003, recognizes all of Mexico's indigenous languages, including Otomi, as "national languages", and gave indigenous people the right to speak them in every sphere of public and private life.

=== Current speaker demography and vitality ===
Currently, Otomi dialects are spoken by circa 239,000 speakers—some 5 to 6 percent of whom are monolingual—in widely scattered districts (see map). The highest concentration of speakers is found in the Valle de Mezquital region of Hidalgo and the southern portion of Querétaro. Some municipalities have concentrations of Otomi speakers as high as 60–70%. Because of recent migratory patterns, small populations of Otomi speakers can be found in new locations throughout Mexico and the United States. In the second half of the 20th century, speaker populations began to increase again, although at a slower pace than the general population. While absolute numbers of Otomi speakers continue to rise, their numbers relative to the Mexican population are falling.

Although Otomi is vigorous in some areas, with children acquiring the language through natural transmission (e.g. in the Mezquital valley and in the Highlands), it is an endangered language. Three dialects in particular have reached moribund status: those of Ixtenco (Tlaxcala state), Santiago Tilapa (Mexico state), and Cruz del Palmar (Guanajuato state). On the other hand, the level of monolingualism in Otomi is as high as 22.3% in Huehuetla, Hidalgo, and 13.1% in Texcatepec, Veracruz). Monolingualism is usually significantly higher among women than among men. Due to the politics from the 1920s to the 1980s that encouraged the "Hispanification" of indigenous communities and made Spanish the only language used in schools, no group of Otomi speakers today has general literacy in Otomi, while their literacy rate in Spanish remains far below the national average. (Note: 33.5% of Otomi speakers are illiterate compared with national average of 8.5% INEGI (2009:74))

== Classification ==
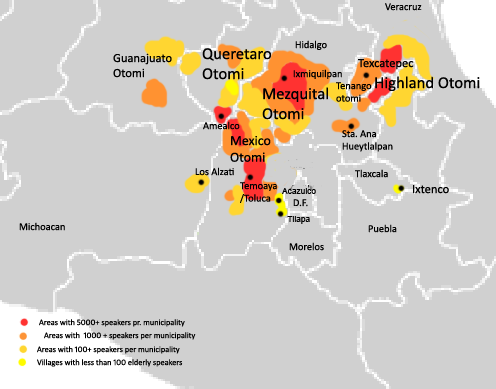
Otomi-speaking areas in Mexico

The Otomi languages belongs to the Oto-Pamean branch of the Oto-Manguean languages. Within Oto-Pamean, it is part of the Otomian subgroup, which also includes Mazahua.

Otomi has traditionally been described as a single language, although its many dialects are not all mutually intelligible. SIL International's Ethnologue considers nine separate Otomi languages based on literature needs and the degree of mutual intelligibility between varieties. It assigns an ISO code to each of these nine. INALI, the Mexican National Institute of Indigenous Languages, avoids the problem of assigning dialect or language status to Otomian varieties by defining "Otomi" as a "linguistic group" with nine different "linguistic varieties". (Note: "A linguistic variety is defined as ‘a variety of speech (i) which has structural and lexical differences in comparison with other varieties within the same linguistic group, and (ii) which has a distinct sociolinguistic mark of identity for their users, different from the sociolinguistic identity born by speakers of other varieties'"(translation by E. Palancar in Palancar (2011:247). Originaltext in Catalogo de las lenguas indígenas nacionales (2008:37)) Still, for official purposes, each variety is considered a separate language. Other linguists, however, consider Otomi to be a dialect continuum that is clearly demarcated from its closest relative, Mazahua. For this article, the latter approach will be followed.

=== Dialectology ===
Dialectologists tend to group the languages into three main groups that reflect historical relationships among the dialects: Northwestern Otomi spoken in the Mezquital Valley and surrounding areas of Hidalgo, Queretaro and Northern Mexico State, Southwestern Otomi spoken in the valley of Toluca, and Eastern Otomi spoken in the Highlands of Northern Puebla, Veracruz and Hidalgo, in Tlaxcala and two towns in the Toluca Valley, San Jerónimo Acazulco and Santiago Tilapa. The Northwestern varieties are characterized by an innovative phonology and grammar, whereas the Eastern varieties are more conservative.

The assignment of dialects to the three groups is as follows: (Note: The classification follows Lastra except in regard to the Amealco dialect which follows Palancar (2009))

- The Eastern group, including all dialects spoken east of the Valle del Mezquital in the center of the State of Hidalgo plus two village dialects from the State of Mexico; specifically: the Highland dialects (the Ethnologue's Highland Otomi, Texcatepec Otomi, and Tenango Otomi), Otomi of Santa Ana Hueytlalpan, as well as three dialects geographically distant from the preceding: the dialects of Tilapa and Acazulco in the state of Mexico, and finally the dialect of Ixtenco (Tlaxcala).
- The Northwestern area, comprising the dialects of Mezquital, Querétaro, and Guanajuato.
- The Southwestern group, including the so called State of Mexico dialect, Otomi of Chapa de Mota, Otomi of Jilotepec, Toluca Otomi, and Otomi of San Felipe los Alzatí, Michoacán. (In point of fact, all the foregoing, except of course for Alzatí, are spoken in the northern half of western lobe of the State of Mexico.)

Approximate number of speakers of all varieties of Otomí: ~212,000
Otomi language	Where spoken	Own name	ISO 639-3	Number of speakers
Highland Otomi	Hidalgo, Puebla, Veracruz	Yųhų	otm	20,000
Mezquital Otomi	Hidalgo Mezquital Valley, and 100 in North Carolina, 230 in Oklahoma and 270 in Texas United States	Hñahñu	ote	100,000
Otomi del Estado de Mexico	N México (state): San Felipe Santiago	Hñatho, Hñotho	ots	10,000
Otomi de Tlaxcala	Tlaxcala: San Juan Bautista Ixtenco	Yųhmų	otz	736
Otomi de Texcatepec	Northwestern Veracruz: Texcatepec, Ayotuxtla, Zontecomatlán Municipio: Hueytepec, Amajac, Tzicatlán.	Ñųhų	otx	12,000
Otomí de Queretaro	Querétaro: Amealco Municipio: towns of San Ildefonso, Santiago Mexquititlán; Acambay Municipio; Tolimán Municipio. Also small numbers in Guanajuato.	Hñohño, Ñañhų, Hñąñho, Ñǫthǫ	otq	33,000
Otomi de Tenango	Hidalgo, Puebla: San Nicolás Tenango	Ñųhų	otn	10,000
Otomí de Tilapa	Santiago Tilapa town between D.F. and Toluca, State of México	Ñųhų	otl	100
Temoaya Otomi	Temoaya Municipio, State of México	Ñatho	ott	37,000

=== Mutual intelligibility ===
70%	Egland & Bartholomew	Ethnologue 16
*	Tolimán (less Tecozautla)	Querétaro (incl. Mexquititlán)
*	Anaya (+ Zozea, Tecozautla)	Mezquital
*	San Felipe	(N: San Felipe) State of Mexico; (S: Jiquipilco) Temoaya
*	—	Tilapa
*	Texcatepec	Texcatepec
*	San Antonio – San Gregorio	Eastern Highland
*	San Nicolás	Tenango
*	Ixtenco	Ixtenco

Egland, Bartholomew & Cruz Ramos (1983) conducted mutual intelligibility tests in which they concluded that eight varieties of Otomi could be considered separate languages in regards to mutual intelligibility, with 80% intelligibility being needed for varieties to be considered part of the same language. They concluded that Texcatepec, Eastern Highland Otomi, and Tenango may be considered the same language at a lower threshold of 70% intelligibility. Ethnologue finds a similar lower level of 70% intelligibility between Querétaro, Mezquital, and Mexico State Otomi. The Ethnologue Temaoya Otomi is split off from Mexico State Otomi, and introduce Tilapa Otomi as a separate language; while Egland's poorly tested Zozea Otomi is subsumed under Anaya/Mezquital.

== Phonology ==
=== Phoneme inventory ===
The following phonological description is that of the dialect of San Ildefonso Tultepec, Querétaro, similar to the system found in the Valle del Mezquital variety, which is the most widely spoken Otomian variety. (Note: The phonology as described by Palancar (2009:2). The Tultepec dialect is chosen here because it is the dialect for which the most complete phonological description is available. Other descriptions exist for Temoaya Otomi Andrews (1949), and several different analyses of Mezquital phonology Wallis (1968), Bernard (1973), Bernard (1967), Bartholomew (1968).)

		Bilabial	Dental	Alveolar	Palatal	Velar	Glottal
Stop	ejective		tʼ	tsʼ	tʃʼ	kʼ	
Stop	unaspirated	p	t	t͡s	t͡ʃ	k	ʔ
Stop	voiced	b	d			ɡ	
Fricative	voiceless	ɸ	θ	s	ʃ	x	h
Fricative	voiced			z			
Nasal		m	n		ɲ		
Liquid	rhotic			r~ɾ			
Liquid	lateral			l			
Semivowel		w			j		

	Front		Central		Back	
	oral	nasal	oral	nasal	oral	nasal
Close	i	ĩ	ɨ		u	ũ
Close-mid	e		ə		o	õ
Near-open	ɛ	ɛ̃			ɔ	
Open			a	ã		

The phoneme inventory of the Proto-Otomi language from which all modern varieties have descended has been reconstructed as /p t k (kʷ) ʔ b d ɡ t͡s ʃ h z m n w j/, the oral vowels /i ɨ u e ø o ɛ a ɔ/, and the nasal vowels /ĩ ũ ẽ ɑ̃/.

=== Phonological diversity of the modern dialects ===
Modern dialects have undergone various changes from the common historic phonemic inventory. Most have voiced the reconstructed Proto-Otomian voiceless nonaspirate stops /p t k/ and now have only the voiced series /b d ɡ/. The only dialects to retain all the original voiceless nonaspirate stops are Otomi of Tilapa and Acazulco and the eastern dialect of San Pablito Pahuatlan in the Sierra Norte de Puebla, and Otomi of Santa Ana Hueytlalpan. A voiceless aspirate stop series /pʰ tʰ kʰ/, derived from earlier clusters of stop + [h], occurs in most dialects, but it has turned into the fricatives /ɸ θ x/ in most Western dialects. Some dialects have innovated a palatal nasal /ɲ/ from earlier sequences of *j and a nasal vowel. In several dialects, the Proto-Otomi clusters *ʔm and *ʔn before oral vowels have become /ʔb/ and /ʔd/, respectively. In most dialects *n has become /ɾ/, as in the singular determiner and the second person possessive marker. The only dialects to preserve /n/ in these words are the Eastern dialects, and in Tilapa these instances of *n have become /d/.

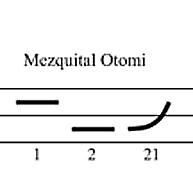
The tone system of Mezquital Otomi; most other dialects have similar systems.

Many dialects have merged the vowels *ɔ and *a into /a/ as in Mezquital Otomi, whereas others such as Ixtenco Otomi have merged *ɔ with *o. The different dialects have between three and five nasal vowels. In addition to the four nasal vowels of proto-Otomi, some dialects have /õ/. Ixtenco Otomi has only /ẽ ũ ɑ̃/, whereas Toluca Otomi has /ĩ ũ ɑ̃/. In the Otomi of Cruz del Palmar, Guanajuato, the nasal vowels are /ĩ ũ õ/, the former *ɑ̃ having changed to /õ/. (Note: In the late 20th century, Mezquital Otomi was reported to be on the verge of losing the distinction between nasal and oral vowels. Bernard noted that *ɑ̃ had become /ɔ/, that /ĩ ~ i/ and /ũ ~ u/ were in free variation, and that the only nasal vowel that continued to be distinct from its oral counterpart was /ẽ/.Bernard (1967)Bernard (1970)) Modern Otomi has borrowed many words from Spanish, in addition to new phonemes that occur only in loan words, such as /l/ that appears in some Otomi dialects instead of the Spanish trilled [r], and /s/, which is not present in native Otomi vocabulary either.

=== Tone and stress ===
All Otomi languages are tonal, and most varieties have three tones, high, low and rising. (Note: During the mid-twentieth century, linguists differed regarding the analysis of tones in Otomi. Kenneth Pike Sinclair & Pike (1948), Doris Bartholomew Bartholomew (1968);Bartholomew (1979) and Blight & Pike (1976) preferred an analysis including three tones, but Leon & Swadesh (1949)and Bernard (1966), Bernard (1974) preferred an analysis with only two tones, in which the rising tone was analyzed as two consecutive tones on one long vowel. In fact, Bernard didn't believe that Otomi should be analyzed as being tonal, as he believed instead that tone in Otomi was not lexical, but rather predictable from other phonetic elements. This analysis was rejected as untenable by the thorough analysis of Wallis (1968) and the three tone analysis became the standard.) One variety of the Sierra dialect, that of San Gregorio, has been analyzed as having a fourth, falling tone. In Mezquital Otomi, suffixes are never specified for tone, while in Tenango Otomi, the only syllables not specified for tone are prepause syllables and the last syllable of polysyllabic words.

Stress in Otomi is not phonemic but rather falls predictably on every other syllable, with the first syllable of a root always being stressed.

== Orthography ==
In this article, the orthography of Lastra (various, including 1996, 2006) is employed which marks syllabic tone. The low tone is unmarked (a), the high level tone is marked with the acute accent (á), and the rising tone with the caron (ǎ). Nasal vowels are marked with a rightward curving hook (ogonek) at the bottom of the vowel letter: į, ę, ą, ų. The letter c denotes [t͡s], y denotes [j], the palatal sibilant [ʃ] is written with the letter š, and the palatal nasal [ɲ] is written ñ. The remaining symbols are from the IPA with their standard values.

=== Classical Otomi ===
Colonial documents in Classical Otomi do not generally capture all the phonological contrasts of the Otomi language. Since the friars who alphabetized the Otomi populations were Spanish speakers, it was difficult for them to perceive contrasts that were present in Otomi but absent in Spanish, such as nasalisation, tone, the large vowel inventory as well as aspirated and glottal consonants. Even when they recognized that there were additional phonemic contrasts in Otomi they often had difficulties choosing how to transcribe them and with doing so consistently. No colonial documents include information on tone. The existence of nasalization is noted by Cárceres, but he does not transcribe it. Cárceres used the letter æ for the low central unrounded vowel [ʌ] and æ with cedille for the high central unrounded vowel ɨ. He also transcribed glottalized consonants as geminates e.g. ttz for [t͡sʔ]. Cárceres used grave-accented vowels è and ò for [ɛ] and [ɔ]. In the 18th century Neve y Molina used vowels with macron ē and ō for these two vowels and invented extra letters (an e with a tail and a hook and an u with a tail) to represent the central vowels.

=== Practical orthography for modern dialects ===
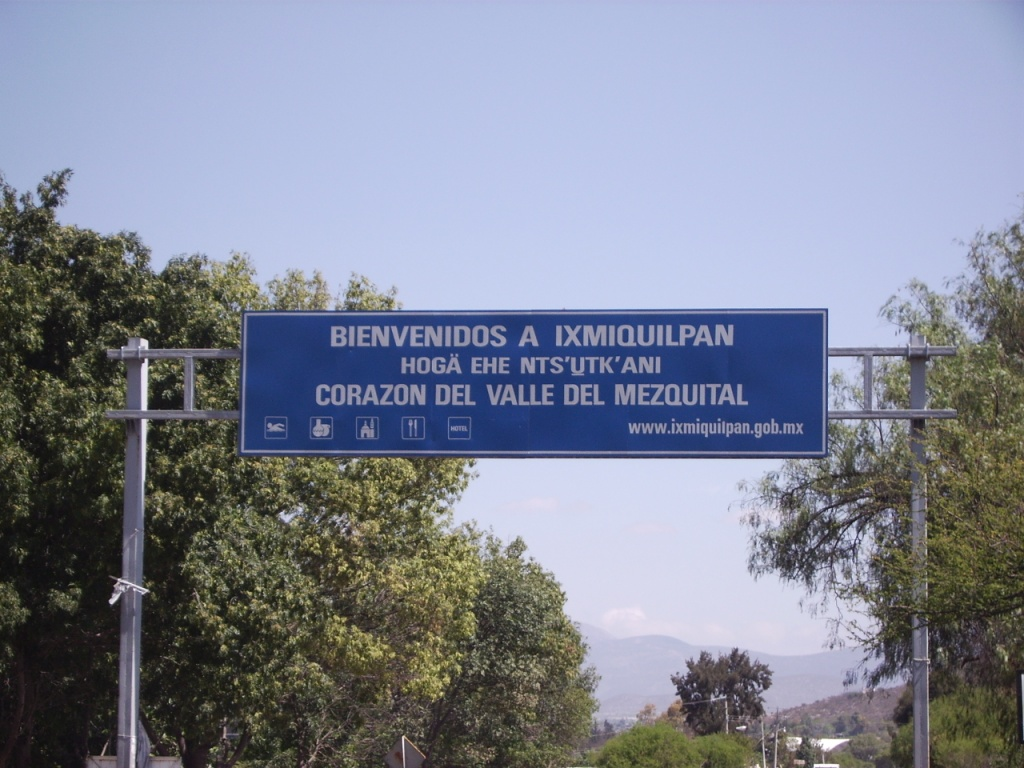
Sign written in Otomi and Spanish in the Mezquital Valley:
BIENVENIDOS A IXMIQUILPAN
HOGÄ EHE NTS'U̲TK'ANI
CORAZON DEL VALLE DEL MEZQUITAL

Orthographies used to write modern Otomi have been a focus of controversy among field linguists for many years. Particularly contentious is the issue of whether or not to mark tone, and how, in orthographies to be used by native speakers. Many practical orthographies used by Otomi speakers do not include tone marking. Bartholomew has been a leading advocate for the marking of tone, arguing that because tone is an integrated element of the language's grammatical and lexical systems, the failure to indicate it would lead to ambiguity. Bernard (1980) on the other hand, has argued that native speakers prefer a toneless orthography because they can almost always disambiguate using context, and because they are often unaware of the significance of tone in their language, and consequently have difficulty learning to apply the tone diacritics correctly. For Mezquital Otomi, H. Russell Bernard accordingly created an orthography in which tone was indicated only when necessary to disambiguate between two words and in which the only symbols used were those available on a standard Spanish language typewriter (employing for example the letter c for [ɔ], v for [ʌ], and the symbol + for [ɨ]). Bernard's orthography has not been influential and in used only in the works published by himself and the Otomi author Jesus Salinas Pedraza.

Practical orthographies used to promote Otomi literacy have been designed and published by the Instituto Lingüístico de Verano (Note: The ILV is the affiliate body of SIL International in Mexico.) and later by the national institute for indigenous languages (INALI). Generally they use diareses ë and ö to distinguish the low mid vowels [ɛ] and [ɔ] from the high mid vowels e and o. High central vowel [ɨ] is generally written ʉ or u̱, and front mid rounded vowel [ø] is written ø or o̱. Letter a with trema, ä, is sometimes used for both the nasal vowel [ã] and the low back unrounded vowel [ʌ]. Glottalized consonants are written with apostrophe (e.g. tz' for [t͡sʔ]) and palatal sibilant [ʃ] is written with x. This orthography has been adopted as official by the Otomi Language Academy centered in Ixmiquilpan, Hidalgo and is used on road signs in the Mezquital region and in publications in the Mezquital variety, such as the large 2004 SIL dictionary published by Hernández Cruz, Victoria Torquemada & Sinclair Crawford (2004). A slightly modified version is used by Enrique Palancar in his grammar of the San Ildefonso Tultepec variety.

== Grammar ==
The morphosyntactic typology of Otomi displays a mixture of synthetic and analytic structures. The phrase level morphology is synthetic, and the sentence level is analytic. Simultaneously, the language is head-marking in terms of its verbal morphology, and its nominal morphology is more analytic.

According to the most common analysis, Otomi has two kinds of bound morphemes, proclitics and affixes. Proclitics differ from affixes mainly in their phonological characteristics; they are marked for tone and block nasal harmony. Some authors consider proclitics to be better analyzed as prefixes. The standard orthography writes proclitics as separate words, whereas affixes are written joined to their host root. Most affixes are suffixes and with few exceptions occur only on verbs, whereas the proclitics occur both in nominal and verbal paradigms. Proclitics mark the categories of definiteness and number, person, negation, tense and aspect – often fused in a single proclitic. Suffixes mark direct and indirect objects as well as clusivity (the distinction between inclusive and exclusive "we"), number, location and affective emphasis. Historically, as in other Oto-Manguean languages, the basic word order is Verb Subject Object, but some dialects tend towards Subject Verb Object word order, probably under the influence of Spanish. Possessive constructions use the order possessed-possessor, but modificational constructions use modifier-head order.

From the variety of Santiago Mexquititlan, Queretaro, here is an example of a complex verb phrase with four suffixes and a proclitic:

Bi=hon-ga-wi-tho-wa
"He/she looks for us only (around) here"

The initial proclitic bi marks the present tense and the third person singular, the verb root hon means "to look for", the -ga- suffix marks a first person object, the -wi- suffix marks dual number, and tho marks the sense of "only" or "just" whereas the -wa- suffix marks the locative sense of "here".

=== Pronominal system: Person and Number ===
Originally, all dialects distinguished singular, dual and plural numbers, but some of the more innovative dialects, such as those of Querétaro and of the Mezquital area, distinguish only singular and plural numbers, sometimes using the previous dual forms as a paucal number. The Ixtenco dialect distinguishes singular, plural, and mass plural numbers. The personal prefixes distinguish four persons, making for a total of eleven categories of grammatical person in most dialects. The grammatical number of nouns is indicated by the use of articles; the nouns themselves are unmarked for number.

In most dialects, the pronominal system distinguishes four persons (first person inclusive and exclusive, second person and third person) and three numbers (singular, dual and plural). The system below is from the Toluca dialect.

	Singular	Dual	Plural
1st person Incl.	*	nugóbé 'you and I'	nugóhé 'I and you guys'
1st Person Excl.	nugó 'I'	nugówí 'we two (not you)'	nugóhɨ́ 'We all (not you)'
2nd Person	nukʔígé 'you'	nukʔígéwí 'you two'	nukʔígégɨ́ 'you guys'
3rd Person	gégé 'she/he/it'	nugégéwí 'the two of them'	nugégéhɨ́ 'they'

The following atypical pronominal system from Tilapa Otomi lacks the inclusive/exclusive distinction in the first person plural and the dual/plural distinction in the second person.

	Singular	Dual	Plural
1st person Excl.	*	nyugambe 'we two (not you)'	nyugahɨ́ 'we all (both incl and excl.)'
1st Person Incl.	nyugá 'I'	nugawi 'you and I'	*
2nd Person	nyukʔe 'you'	nyukʔewi 'you two'	nyukʔehɨ́ 'you guys'
3rd Person	nyuaní 'she/he/it'	*	nyuyí 'they' (both dual and plural)

=== Nouns ===
Otomi nouns are marked only for their possessor; plurality is expressed via pronouns and articles. There is no case marking. The particular pattern of possessive inflection is a widespread trait in the Mesoamerican linguistic area: there is a prefix agreeing in person with the possessor, and if the possessor is plural or dual, then the noun is also marked with a suffix that agrees in number with the possessor. Demonstrated below is the inflectional paradigm for the word ngų́ "house" in the dialect of Toluca.

	Singular	Dual	Plural
1st person Excl.	*	mą-ngų́-bé 'our house (me and him/her)'	mą-ngų́-hé 'our house (me and them)'
1st Person Incl.	mą-ngų́ 'my house'	mą-ngų́-wí 'our house (me and you)'	mą-ngų́-hɨ́ 'our house (me and you and them)'
2nd Person	ri-ngų́ 'your house'	ri-ngų́-wí 'the house of the two of you'	ri-ngų́-hɨ́ 'the house of you guys'
3rd Person	rʌ-ngų́ 'her/his/its house'	yʌ-ngų́-wí 'the house of the two of them'	yʌ-ngų́-hɨ́ 'their house'

==== Articles ====
Definite articles preceding the noun are used to express plurality in nominal elements, since the nouns themselves are invariant for grammatical number. Most dialects have rʌ 'the (singular)' and yʌ 'the (dual/plural)'. Example noun phrases:

Singular	Dual	Plural
rʌ ngų́ 'the house'	yʌ yóho ngų́ 'the two houses'	yʌ ngų́ 'the houses'

Classical Otomi, as described by Cárceres, distinguished neutral, honorific, and pejorative definite articles: ąn, neutral singular; o, honorific singular; nø̌, pejorative singular; e, neutral and honorific plural; and yo, pejorative plural.

ąn ngų́ 'the house'

o ngų́ 'the honored house'

nø̌ ngų́ 'the damn house'

=== Verbs ===
Verb morphology is synthetic and has elements of both fusion and agglutination.

Verb stems are inflected through a number of different processes: the initial consonant of the verb root changes according to a morphophonemic pattern of consonant mutations to mark present vs. non-present, and active vs. passive. Verbal roots may take a formative syllable or not depending on syntactic and prosodic factors. A nasal prefix may be added to the root to express reciprocality or middle voice. Some dialects, notably the eastern ones, have a system of verb classes that take different series of prefixes. These conjugational categories have been lost in the Western dialects, although they existed in the Western areas in the colonial period as can be seen from Cárceres's grammar.

Verbs are inflected for either direct object or indirect object (but not for both simultaneously) by suffixes. The categories of person of subject, tense, aspect, and mood are marked simultaneously with a formative which is either a verbal prefix or a proclitic depending on analysis. These proclitics can also precede nonverbal predicates. The dialects of Toluca and Ixtenco distinguish the present, preterit, perfect, imperfect, future, pluperfect, continuative, imperative, and two subjunctives. Mezquital Otomi has additional moods. On transitive verbs, the person of the object is marked by a suffix. If either subject or object is dual or plural, it is shown with a plural suffix following the object suffix. So the structure of the Otomi verb is as follows:

Person of Subject/TAM (proclitic)	Prefixes (e.g. voice, adverbial modification)	Root	formative	Object suffix	1st person emphatic suffix	Plural/Dual suffix

==== Person, number, tense, aspect and mood ====
The present tense prefixes are di- (1st person), gi- (2nd person), i- (3rd person).

	Singular	Dual	Plural
1st person Excl.	*	di-nú-bé 'we see (me and him/her)'	di-nú-hé 'we see (me and them)'
1st Person Incl.	di-nú 'I see'	di-nú-wí 'we see (me and you)'	mdi-nú-hɨ́ 'we see (me and you and them)'
2nd Person	gi-nú 'you see'	gi-nú-wí 'you two see'	gi-nú-hɨ́ 'you guys see'
3rd Person	i-nú 'she/he/it sees'	i-nú-wí 'the two of them see'	i-nú-hɨ́ 'they see'

The Preterite is marked by the prefixes do-, ɡo-, and bi-, the Perfect by to-, ko-, ʃi-, the Imperfect bydimá, ɡimá, mi, the Future by ɡo-, ɡi-, and da-, and the Pluperfect by tamą-, kimą-, kamą-. All tenses use the same suffixes as the Present tense for dual and plural numbers and clusivity. The difference between Preterite and Imperfect is similar to the distinction between the Spanish Preterite habló 'he spoke (punctual)' and the Spanish Imperfect hablaba 'he spoke/he used to speak/he was speaking (non-punctual)'.

In Toluca Otomi, the semantic difference between the two subjunctive forms (A and B) has not yet been clearly understood in the linguistic literature. Sometimes subjunctive B implicates that is more recent in time than subjunctive A. Both indicate something counterfactual. In other Otomi dialects, such as Otomi of Ixtenco Tlaxcala, the distinction between the two forms is one of subjunctive as opposed to irrealis. The Past and Present Progressive are similar in meaning to English 'was' and 'is X-ing', respectively. The Imperative is used for issuing direct orders.

Verbs expressing movement towards the speaker such as ʔįhį 'come' use a different set of prefixes for marking person/TAM. These prefixes can also be used with other verbs to express 'to do something while coming this way'. In Toluca Otomi mba- is the third person singular Imperfect prefix for movement verbs.

mba-tųhų
3/MVMT/IMPERF-sing
'he came singing'

When using nouns predicatively, the subject prefixes are simply added to the noun root:

drʌ-mǒkhá
1SG/PRES/CONT-priest
'I am a priest'

==== Transitivity and stative verbs ====
Transitive verbs are inflected for agreement with their objects by means of suffixes, while using the same subject prefixes as the intransitive verbs to agree with their agents. However, in all dialects a few intransitive verbs take the object suffix instead of the subject prefix. Often such intransitive verbs are stative, i.e. describing a state, which has prompted the interpretation that morphosyntactic alignment in Otomi is split between active–stative and accusative systems.

In Toluca Otomi the object suffixes are -gí (first person), -kʔí (second person) and -bi (third person), but the vowel /i/ may harmonize to /e/ when suffixed to a root containing /e/. The first person suffix is realized as -kí after sibilants and after certain verb roots, and as -hkí when used with certain other verbs. The second person object suffix may sometimes metathesise to -ʔkí. The third person suffix also has the allomorphs -hpí/-hpé, -pí, -bí as well as a zero morpheme in certain contexts.

1st person object	2nd person object	3rd person object
bi-ñús-kí he/PAST-write-me 'he wrote me'	bi-ñús-kʔí he/PAST-write-you 'he wrote you'	bi-kré-bi he/PAST-believe-it 'he believed it'
bi-nú-gí he/PAST-see-me 'he saw me'	bi-nú-kʔí he/PAST-see-you 'he saw you'	bi-hkwáhti-bí he/she/PAST-hit-him/her 'she/he hit him/her'

Object number (dual or plural) is marked by the same suffixes that are used for the subject, which can lead to ambiguity about the respective numbers of subject and object. With object suffixes of the first or second person, the verbal root sometimes changes, often by the deletion of the final vowel. For example:

dual object/subject

bi-ñaš-kʔí-wí
he/PAST-cut.hair-you-DU
'the two of them cut your hair' or
'he cut the hair of the two of you'

plural object/subject

bi-ñaš-kí-hɨ́
he/PAST-cut.hair-you-PL
'they cut my hair' or 'he cut our hair'

A word class that refers to properties or states has been described either as adjectives or as stative verbs. The members of this class ascribe a property to an entity, e.g. "the man is tall", "the house is old". Within this class some roots use the normal subject/T/A/M prefixes, while others always use the object suffixes to encode the person of the patient/subject. The fact that roots in the latter group encode the patient/subject of the predicate using the same suffixes as transitive verbs use to encode the patient/object has been interpreted as a trait of Split intransitivity, and is apparent in all Otomi dialects; but which specific stative verbs take the object prefixes and the number of prefixes they take varies between dialects. In Toluca Otomi, most stative verbs are conjugated using a set of suffixes similar to the object/patient suffixes and a third person subject prefix, while only a few use the Present Continuative subject prefixes. The following are examples of the two kinds of stative verb conjugation in Toluca Otomi:

with patient/object suffix

rʌ-nǒ-hkʔí
it/PRES-fat-me
'I am fat'

with subject/agent prefix

drʌ-dǒtʔî
I/PRES/CONT-short
'I am short'

=== Syntax ===
Otomi has the nominative–accusative alignment, but by one analysis there are traces of an emergent active–stative alignment.

==== Word order ====
Some dialects have SVO as the most frequent word order, for example Otomi of Toluca and of San Ildefonso, Querétaro, while VSO word order is basic to other dialects such as Mezquital Otomi. Proto-Otomi is also thought to have had VSO order as verb-initial order is the most frequent basic word order in other Oto-Manguean languages. It has been suggested that some Otomi dialects are shifting from a verb-initial to a subject-initial basic word order under the influence of Spanish.

==== Clause types ====
Lastra (1997:49–69) describes the clause types in Ixtenco Otomi. The four basic clause types are indicative, negative, interrogative and imperative. These four types can either be simple, conjunct or complex (with a subordinate clause). Predicative clauses can be verbal or non-verbal. Non-verbal predicative clauses are usually equational or ascriptive (with the meaning 'X is Y'). In a non-vebal predicative clause the subject precedes the predicate, except in focus constructions where the order is reversed. The negation particle precedes the predicate.

ni-ngú ndɨ^té
your-house big
'your house is big'

thɛ̌ngɨ ʔnį́
red pepper
'its red, the pepper' (focus)

Equational clauses can also be complex:

títa habɨ ditá yɨ khą́ ʔí
sweathouse where bathe the people
'the sweat house is where people bathe'

Clauses with a verb can be intransitive or transitive. In Ixtenco Otomi, if a transitive verb has two arguments represented as free noun phrases, the subject usually precedes the verb and the object follows it.

ngé rʌ ñôhɨ šʌ-hió rʌ ʔyo
so the man killed the dog
"the man killed the dog"

This order is also the norm in clauses where only one constituent is expressed as a free noun phrase. In Ixtenco Otomi verb-final word order is used to express focus on the object, and verb-initial word order is used to put focus on the predicate.

ngɨ^bo di-pho-mi ma-ʔya-wi
brains we-have-them our-heads-PL
"our brains, we have them in our heads" (focus on object)

Subordinate clauses usually begin with one of the subordinators such as khandi 'in order to', habɨ 'where', khati 'even though', mba 'when', ngege 'because'. Frequently the future tense is used in these subordinate clause. Relative clauses are normally expressed by simple juxtaposition without any relative pronoun. Different negation particles are used for the verbs "to have", "to be (in a place)" and for imperative clauses.

hingi pá che ngege po na chú "(s)he doesn't go alone because (s)he's afraid"

Interrogative clauses are usually expressed by intonation, but there is also a question particle ši. Content questions use an interrogative pronoun before the predicate.

té bi-khá-nɨ́
what it-is
what's that?'

=== Numerals ===
Like all other languages of the Mesoamerican linguistic area, Otomi has a vigesimal number system. The following numerals are from Classical Otomi as described by Cárceres. The e prefixed to all numerals except one is the plural nominal determiner (the a associated with -nʔda being the singular determiner).

- 1 anʔda
- 2 eyoho
- 3 ehių
- 4 ekoho
- 5 ekɨtʔa
- 6 eʔdata
- 7 eyoto
- 8 ehyąto
- 9 ekɨto
- 10 eʔdɛta
- 11 eʔdɛta ma ʔda
- 20 eʔdote
- 40 eyote
- 60 ehyąte

== Vocabulary ==
There are also considerable lexical differences between the Otomi dialects. Often terms will be shared between the eastern and southwestern dialects, while the northwestern dialects tend toward more innovative forms. (Note: The table below is based on data from Lastra (2006: 43–62).)

	Gundhó (Mezquital)	San Ildefonso, Amealco	Toluca	Tilapa	Ixtenco	Huehuetla (Highland)
paper	hɛ̌ʔmí	hɛ̌ʔmi	cųhkwá	cɨ̌hkó	cuhkwá	cø̌hkwą́
mother	ną́ną́	nóno	mé	mbé	ną́ną́	mbé
metal	bɛkhá (Note: Here tʔɛɡí means 'bell'.)	bøkhǫ́	tʔéɡí	tʔɛ̌ɡi	tʔɛɡi	tʔɛ̌ki
money	bokhą́	bokhǫ́	domi (Note: Borrowed from colonial Spanish tomín 'silver coin used in parts of colonial Spanish America'.)	mbɛhti	tʔophó	tʔophó (Note: Other highland dialects use mbɛhti (Tutotepec, Hidalgo) and menyu (Hueytlalpan).)
much/a lot	ndųnthį́	nzɛya	dúnthí	pongí	chú	ʃøngų́

=== Loan words ===
Otomi languages have borrowed words from both Spanish and Nahuatl. The phonological structure of loanwords is assimilated to Otomi phonology. Since Otomi lacks the trill /r/, this sound is normally altered to [l], as in lódá from Spanish ruda 'rue (medicinal herb)', while Spanish /l/ can be borrowed as the tap /ɾ/ as in baromaʃi 'dove' from Spanish paloma. The Spanish voiceless stops /p, t, k/ are usually borrowed as their voiced counterparts as in bádú 'duck' from Spanish pato 'duck'. Loanwords from Spanish with stress on the first syllable are usually borrowed with high tone on all syllables as in: sábáná 'blanket' from Spanish sábana 'bedsheet'. Nahuatl loanwords include ndɛ̌nt͡su 'goat' from Nahuatl teːnt͡soneʔ 'goat' (literally "beard possessor"), and different forms for the Nahuatl word for 'pig', pitso:tɬ. Both of these loans have obviously entered Otomi in the colonial period after the Spanish introduced those domestic animals. In the period before Spanish contact it appears that borrowing between Nahuatl and Otomi was sparse whereas there are numerous instances of loan translations from that period, probably due to widespread bilingualism.

== Poetry ==
Among the Aztecs the Otomi were well known for their songs, and a specific genre of Nahuatl songs called otoncuicatl "Otomi Song" are believed to be translations or reinterpretations of songs originally composed in Otomi. None of the songs written in Otomi during the colonial period have survived; however, beginning in the early 20th century, anthropologists have collected songs performed by modern Otomi singers. Anthropologists Roberto Weitlaner and Jacques Soustelle collected Otomi songs during the 1930s, and a study of Otomi musical styles was conducted by Vicente T. Mendoza. Mendoza found two distinct musical traditions: a religious, and a profane. The religious tradition of songs, with Spanish lyrics, dates to the 16th century, when missionaries such as Pedro de Gante taught Indians how to construct European style instruments to be used for singing hymns. The profane tradition, with Otomi lyrics, possibly dates to pre-Columbian times, and consists of lullabies, joking songs, songs of romance or ballads, and songs involving animals. As in the traditions of other Mesoamerican languages, a common poetic instrument is the use of parallelism, couplets, difrasismos (Mesoamerican couplet metaphors, similar to kennings) and repetition. In the 21st century a number of Otomi literary works have been published, including the work ra hua ra hiä by Adela Calva Reyes. The following example of an Otomi song about the brevity of life was recollected by Ángel María Garibay K. in the mid-twentieth century: (Note: Originally published in Garibay (1971:238), republished in phonemic transcription in Lastra (2006:69–70))

Dąthé thogi thogi
hínkhąbɨ thege
Ndąhi thogi thogi
hínkhąbɨ thege
Mʔbɨ́ y thogi...
hínkhąbɨ pɛ̌ngi

The river passes, passes
it never stops
The wind passes, passes
it never stops
Life passes...
it never comes back

Collection of sermons in the Otomi language from the 16th century
