= Arqueología Mexicana =

Mexican archaeology journal

Arqueología Mexicana

Arqueología Mexicana (Mexican Archaeology) is a bimonthly journal published by Editorial Raíces and the Mexican Instituto Nacional de Antropología e Historia (National Institute of Anthropology and History). The first issue, devoted to Teotihuacán, was published in April–May in 1993.

== Content ==
Arqueología Mexicana contains articles by scholars, a wide selection of photographs on the diverse Mesoamerican cultures, as well as maps and timelines that provide a modern understanding of the Mesoamerican legacy.
