= Oto-Pamean languages =

Branch of the Oto-Manguean languages of Mexico

Oto-Pamean
- Geographic distribution: Mexico
- Native speakers: 450,000 (2020)
- Linguistic classification: Oto-Manguean: Western ?; Oto-Pame–Chinantecan ?; Oto-Pamean
- Subdivisions: Otomian; Matlatzinca; Chichimeca Jonaz; Pame

Language codes
- Glottolog: otop1242
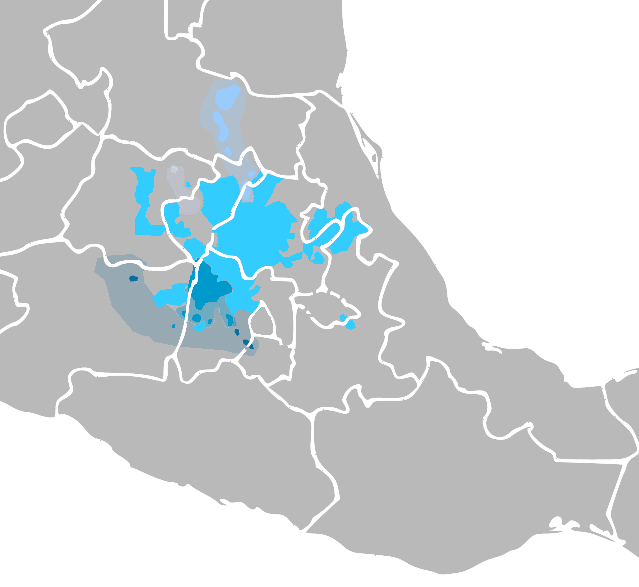
- Area of Oto-Pamean languages in 1900

The Oto-Pamean languages are a branch of the Oto-Manguean languages that includes languages of the Otomi-Mazahua, Matlatzinca, and Pamean language groups all of which are spoken in central Mexico. Like all Oto-Manguean languages, the Oto-Pamean languages are tonal languages, though most have relatively simple tone systems. Unlike many Oto-Manguean languages that tend towards an isolating typology, they are morphologically complex headmarking languages with complex systems of conjugational classes both for verbs and nouns, and in the Pamean languages there are highly complex patterns of suppletion.

== Classification ==
- Otomian
  - Otomi
    - Northwestern Otomi
    - Tilapa Otomi
    - Sierra Otomi
    - Central Mexican Otomi
    - Toluca Otomi
    - Tlaxcala Otomi
  - Mazahua
    - 12 different varieties
- Matlatzincan
  - Ocuilteco/Tlawika
  - Matlatzinca de Oxtotilpan
- Pame
  - Northern Pame
  - Central Pame
  - Southern Pame †
- Chichimeco Jonaz

== Proto-language ==
Proto-Oto-Pamean
- Reconstruction of: Oto-Pamean languages

Four vowels with nasalization contrast are reconstructed for Proto-Oto-Pamean by Bartholomew (1989):

- *a, *e, *i, *o
- *ã, *ẽ, *ĩ, *õ

Lexical reconstructions of Proto-Oto-Pamean by Bartholomew (1989) are given below, along with synchronic Oto-Pamean languages:

English gloss	Proto-Oto-Pamean	Otomi	Matlatzinca	North Pame	Mazahua	Ocuilteco	Chichimeco
chile	*ʔi	ʔi	mi	ʔei	ʔiʔi	mi	ʔe
blood	*kʰi	kʰi	či-hyabi	kkʰi	kʰiʔi	nči-hya	kʰe
squirrel	*mi-nã	minã	mini	meigŋ		mi	
tell	*si-p	šipʰi	ši	sep	šipʰi		se
pull	*kiʔHC-mʔ	kʰɨʔmi	kɨɨza	kkeʔedn	kʰɨbʔɨ	nkɨbi	keʔenʔ
chin	*kʰiHC-nʔ	kʰɨni	nčɨri	kʰwelʔ	kʔɨdʔɨ	nčɨli	
beans	*kʰiHC-ʔ	kʰɨ	čʰɨ	nkʰweʔ	kʰɨʔɨ	čʰɨ	kʰeʔ
louse	*tʔo	tʔoni	tʔo	lʔo	tʔoʔo	tʔo	rʔo
house	*tʔo-s	tʔoši 'bed'	tʔoši 'supper'	lʔos	tʔošɨ 'bed'		rʔos
stone	*=to	do	nto	to	ndo	nto	ro
flower	*=toHC-n	dəni	təni	togŋ	ndəhnə	ndə	ro
hen	*ʔoHC-n	ʔəni	ʔəni	ʔogŋ	ʔənə	ʔə	
hear	*ʔoHC-t	ʔəde	ʔəti	ʔoʔ	ʔərə	ʔəti	ʔo
water	*=teh	dege	tawi	tæ	ndehe	nta	ri
to weave	*pe	pe	pa	ppæ	peʔe	mpa	pi
mouth	*ne	ne	na	næ	neʔe	ši-na 'lips'	ni
people	*te	te	ta	læ	teʔe	tạ	
spider	*me-s	meše	maši	mæs	meše	maši	
to cough	*hyeh	hehe	hyewi 'a cold'	hhæ	hehe	he	
a cold	*t-heh	tʰehe	hyewi	ri-tʰyæʔæ	tʰe		
one	*nʔa	ʔna	dawi	nda	daha	la	ntʔa
plain	*mʔa-tʰa	ʔmatʰa	bati	nibia	bʔatʰɨ	bati	
horse	*pah-nʔ	pʰani	pari	wahalʔ	pʰadʔɨ	bali	
straw mat	*pĩh-ʔ	ši-mpʰĩ	mpʰiwi	ppẽhiʔ	pʰi-ngwa	pʰi	
drunken	*tĩ, *nĩ	ntĩ	nimi		tĩʔi	ni	
to look	*nõ	nũ	nu	nnõʔo	nũʔu	nu 'wake up'	nũʔu
to tie up	*tõ-tʔ/cʔ	tũtʔi	tuncʔi 'know'	ttocʔ 'knot'	tũntʔɨ	tuncʔi	tucʔ 'knot'
to die	*tũ	tũ	tuwi	ttõ	tũʔu	tu	rũ
owner	*mʰõ	ʰmũ	mʰu	mʰõʔ	ʰmũʔu	mʰu	mʰũ
to steal	*pẽ	pæ̃	pewi	ppæ̃	pẽ	pe	ppĩ
tortilla	*mʰẽ	ʰmæ̃	mʰewi	mʰæ̃		mʰe	
tamale	*tʰẽ-t	tʰæ̃di	tʰeti	lʰæ̃ʔæ	tʰẽʒẽ	tʰenti	rʔĩhi
atole	*tʔẽ-m	tʔæ̃i	tʔemi	lʔæ̃ŋ	tʔẽʰme	tʔe	rʔĩ
to roast	*hã-s	hãši	həši	hãs	hãša	həši	hüs
to say	*mã-m	mã	məmi	mmãŋ	mãmã	mə	mã
to know	*pã-t	pãdi	pəya	ppã 'visit'	pãra	mpəya	pã 'see'
to buy	*tao-m	tɔi	tami	ttaogŋ	tɔmɨ	ta	ta
mucus	*mʔao-s	ʔmɔši	maši 'nose'	mbaos	bʔɔšɨ	maši 'nose'	
to ask	*ʔao-nʔ	ʔɔni	ʔari	ʔahodnʔ	ʔɔnɨ	ʔali	ʔan
to try	*cao	cɔ	copi	cʔaoʔ	sɔʔɔ	co	
avocado	*cʔao-n	cʔɔni	cʔoni	cʔaogŋ	sʔɔhnɨ	cʔo	
to stand up	*mʔao-mʔ	ʔmɔi			bʔɔbʔɨ	nbohobi	
white	*tʔoa-s	tʔaši	tʔoši	ddoa	tʔɔšɨ		nuʔu
plow	*tʔoa-p	tʔabi	tʔopi		tʔɔbi	tʔopi	rʔu
bat	*coa-cʔ	cacʔi	cocʔi	čoacʔ		cocʔi	
foot	*koa	gwa	kwahtu	koa	ngwaʔa		gu
wing	*hoa	hwa	nʰowi	hoa	hwaʔa	nʰo	
maguey	*nʔoa	ʔwada		ddoa	ʔwadɨ	nlooti	nʔu
bitter	*kʰão	kʰũ	čʰə	kʰão	kʰõʔo	čʰə	kʰã
to sing	*tãoh	tũhu	təwi	ndão	tõho	tə	
moon	*mʔão-ʔ		mbə	mʔãoʔ		bə	mʔãʔ
night	*são-m	šũi	šəmi	são	šõmɨ	lšũ	sã
shadow	*são-t/mʔ	šũdi	šubi	sãot	šõrɨ	čʰubi	
corn	*tʰõa	tʰã	tʰuwi	lʰõa	tʰõʔo	tʰu	
cornfield	*nhõa-ʰm	hwãhi	nomi	nʰõa	hwãʰma	nu	nʰũ
to confess	*kõah-	kʰwãni	kunya	kkõaho	kʰwãmʔa		
to beat	*paih-ʔmʔ	pʰæʔmi	papi	ppahiʔ	pʰæʔbʔi		pe
to abandon	*hai-k/mʔ	hægi	habi	haigŋ	hæzi	habi	he
abandoned	*hi-ai-k	hyægi	heči	nʰiagŋ	hyæzi	heči	hi
hand	*nʔi-ai	ʔyæ	ye	nʔia	dyʔæʔæ	ye	nʔi
liver	*nia	ya	ya 'heart'	nia		ya 'heart'	
to dance	*nãih-mʔ	nẽi	nəbi	nnãhiʔ	nẽmʔe	nəhəbi	nẽheʔ
to nurse	*coi	cɨ	čuʔu	ciʔ	siʔi	ci	čüʔ
to ride horseback	*teog	təge		llæogŋ	čəgə	nde	
to burn	*ceo	nze	ceti		zərə		
meat	*nkoeHC	ngə		ŋgwæʔ	nge		gu
star	*coeHC	cə	nceʔe		sehe	ce	
cold	*coe	cæ	ce	cæ	sæʔæ	ce	či
to split wood	*coe-nʔ	cæni	seri	ccæʔædn		celi	čin
fly	*ʔõi	ʔwæ̃	ʔu	ʔẽi	ʔwæ	ngwi	ʔẽ
hunger	*tʰõi	tʰũhu		lʰõi	tʰĩʰmi	tʰu	
squash	*mõih-ʔ	mũ	muhu	mõhiʔ	mũʔu	muʰli	mũhuʔ
sand	*mĩo-m	-mũ	mumi	mmẽoŋ		mu	
full	*nĩo-t	yũdi	nuti	næ̃	ñiʒi	nuti	
three	*nʰĩo	hyũ	hyu	nʰõʔ	ʰñĩʔi	hyu	nʰũ
