= Automotive industry in Mexico =

Motorcars first arrived in Mexico City in 1903. Since then, several vehicle brands have been especially successful. A number of manufacturers make vehicles in Mexico, and many brands have been and continue to be available.

== History ==
=== Early years (1903–1960) ===
In 1903, motorcars first arrived in Mexico City, totaling 136 cars in that year and rising to 800 by 1906. This encouraged then president Porfirio Díaz, to create both the first Mexican highway code (which would allow cars to move at a maximum speed of 10 km/h or 6 mph on crowded or small streets and 40 km/h or 25 mph elsewhere) and, along with this, a tax for car owners which would be abolished in 1911 with Francisco I. Madero's successful campaign against Díaz's presidency at the outbreak of the Mexican Revolution. In 1910, Daimler and Renault both established small facilities for the local assembly of vehicles primarily for the Mexican government at the behest of Porfirio Díaz, but these functioned for little more than a few months before being destroyed in the Mexican Revolution. A short time after the end of the armed struggle, Buick became the first automobile producer to be officially established in Mexico, beginning in 1921. In 1925, Ford Motor Company was established and began manufacturing vehicles in the country, and, as of 2020, remains the longest-running brand in the country. In 1961, Mexico produced its first fully domestic vehicle, a small truck called the Rural Ramírez, produced by the Ramírez truck company.

=== Decline (1961–1993) ===
Many car makers were already operational by 1961 when the first decline of the Mexican economy showed up. In the early 1960s, government regulations forced car companies to assemble cars in Mexico, using local as well as imported components. The idea was to develop a national car industry in the country, to promote employment and technological advances. Those companies that would not comply with these regulations left the country; these included Mercedes-Benz, FIAT, Citroën, Peugeot and Volvo. The American Big Three (General Motors, Ford and Chrysler) remained along with American Motors, Renault, Volkswagen, Datsun and Borgward.

In this same year, due to the announcement of the upcoming 1968 Summer Olympics to be held in Mexico, the Government reissued Díaz's car ownership tax, purportedly to afford the construction of new facilities for such an event; this was named the Tenencia Vehicular (from the verb tener; "to have" in Spanish). However, the tax remained to finance the 1970 FIFA World Cup, also held in Mexico. Ironically, the tax remains today in most states, and it must be paid year after year. This tax is variable depending on the car's value, number of cylinders, type of transmission, air conditioning and further features, adding up to a payment of up to 10% of the car's total value.

A second tax exists as well when purchasing a new vehicle called Impuesto sobre Automóviles Nuevos or ISAN ("Tax on new cars"), also depending on a vehicle's specifications and cost. Unlike the Tenencia, this tax is paid only once. Federal law requires all listed car prices in media or dealerships to have the standard 16% VAT tax and ISAN included in the listed price.

Since many Mexican drivers default on paying this tax, the Government started taking countermeasures. However, due to this being perceived as uncontrollable, politicians started making proposals to abolish this tax, remarkably Felipe Calderón. Tenencia has, as of 2011, only been abolished in Querétaro. On March 4, 2011, President Calderón announced Tenencia would be completely abolished by 2012 in all states, but not in the Federal District which comprises most of Mexico City.

=== Rebirth (1994–2006) ===
The growth of Mexico's economy during the late '90s stimulated car sales in Mexico and, eventually, most of the retired carmakers re-established themselves in the country. Makers such as Honda and Porsche arrived for the first time during the last years of the 20th Century, and others such as Peugeot and Mercedes-Benz gave Mexico a "second chance", both re-establishing in 1997.

Annual passenger vehicle sales in Mexico reached the one million milestone in 2005. The increasing sales figures encouraged carmakers to offer cars with alternative fuels like the Honda Civic Hybrid and the Volkswagen Jetta TDI. Such cars hadn't been available in Mexico since the first diesel-powered Volkswagen Caribe in the late 70's and early 80's (see paragraphs for each maker: Honda and Volkswagen). Still, few carmakers have released their diesel-powered versions in the Mexican market due to stricter government emissions laws than those of the European Union Euro IV standard. This results in a petrol only car market in which drivers cannot reap the potential benefits of diesel automobiles. Diesel cars are not suited/permitted for everyday driving in Mexico City; brand new diesel vehicles face the "Hoy no Circula" restrictions.

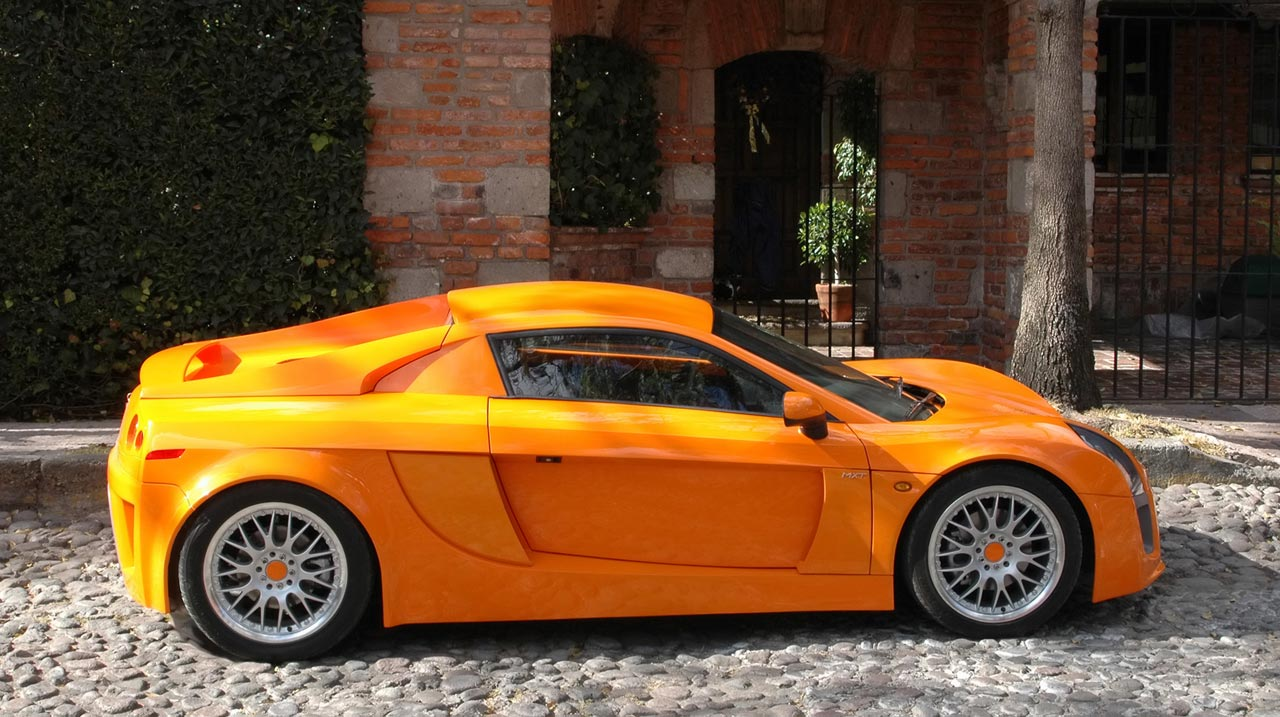
Mastretta-MXT-lg

=== Current market (2007–present) ===
Mexican studio Mastretta Cars first announced the creation of their MXT through Automóvil Panamericano magazine in May 2007. This vehicle is the very first Mexican sports car ever built, and features specifications similar to those of Lotus Elise and Porsche Cayman. The production of the MXT started in January 2011.

In 2010, Mexican bus maker Cimex announced that it was expanding into the passenger vehicle field and was developing a pickup truck called the Conin which would be Mexico's first domestic pickup truck when expected to enter production in 2013.

To date, 42 makers have official representation in the country with nearly 400 different models, making Mexico one of the most varied automotive markets in the world.

The automotive sector accounts for 17.6% of Mexico's manufacturing sector. Mexico is the second largest automobile manufacturing nation in the Western Hemisphere, after the United States, having produced 4 million vehicles in 2017. The industry produces technologically complex components and engages in research and development. The "Big Three" (General Motors, Ford and Chrysler) have been operating in Mexico since the 1930s, while Volkswagen and Nissan built their plants in the 1960s. In Puebla alone, 70 industrial part-makers cluster around Volkswagen. In the 2010s, expansion of the sector was surging. In 2014, more than $10 billion in investment was committed in the first few months of the year. Kia Motors in August 2014 announced plans for a $1 billion factory in Nuevo León. At the time, Mercedes-Benz and Nissan were already building a $1.4 billion plant near the city of Aguascalientes, while BMW was planning a $1-billion assembly plant in San Luis Potosí. Additionally, Audi began building a $1.3 billion factory near Puebla in 2013. Of the Mexican car exports to the US, most are carried by rail, and some by sea.

== Vehicle use restrictions ==
In Mexico City, the "Hoy no circula" ("Cannot be driven today") program is implemented. Every vehicle has a color sticker depending on the ending number of its plate, as well as a number to determine its pollution rate. Brand new cars "00" and recent models "0" are exempt; "Hoy no circula" only applies to vehicles older than 8 years, which have "1" and "2" designations. The program works by removing these vehicles from circulation one day during the week, and recently one Saturday per month, depending on their last license plate digit number. Said limitations occur as follows:

- Plates ending with 5 or 6 (yellow) cannot be driven on Mondays and the 1st Saturday of the current month.
- Plates ending with 7 or 8 (pink) cannot be driven on Tuesdays and the 2nd Saturday of the current month.
- Plates ending with 3 or 4 (red) cannot be driven on Wednesdays and the 3rd Saturday of the current month.
- Plates ending with 1 or 2 (green) cannot be driven on Thursdays and the 4th Saturday of the current month.
- Plates ending with 9 or 0 (blue) cannot be driven on Fridays and the 5th Saturday (if any) of the current month.

For example, a fictional 1985 Volkswagen Golf with 903-NRX plates wouldn't be allowed to be driven on Wednesdays, September 18, 2010, nor October 16, 2010, etc. The newer weekends restrictions have received criticism. Only a few months a year have five Saturdays, and so the blue-stickered cars will be removed only four or five weekends a year from circulation, while the rest of the cars will be weekend-banned once every month.

== Automotive culture and Mexico's auto show ==
Since the first "Autoexpo del Automóvil", the automotive culture in Mexico has been growing. The first Mexican auto magazines were published in November 1982 by Motor y Volante magazine, which became famous instantly for its irreverent criticism and professional performance testing of local versions of many cars. After more than 10 years of being the sole specialty magazine, other publishers decided to jump on the bandwagon; in early 1995, 4 Ruedas Magazine, and shortly after, Automóvil Panamericano saw light. Technological advances have resulted in Motor y Volante remaining the sole digital auto magazine (by subscription only) but with an extremely large affiliation due to its 30 years of existence. The Autoexpo changed denomination in 2004 to the "Salón Internacional del Automovil" to reflect its growth into an international size event. It is in fact an event comparable to the North American International Auto Show in Detroit. In the first two editions of Mexico's Auto Show, brands new to Mexico, like Mazda, were introduced. Jaguar and Volvo did not attend the 2004 or the 2005 editions. Renault would typically attend every two years. However, the 2006 edition of the auto show was considered a failure and a fraud since over 15 carmakers missed the event, including Volkswagen Group, Renault and Peugeot. After the 2006 edition and for the first time since 1994, SIAM was not hosted the following year. A two-year event is currently hosted.

== Successful cars in Mexico ==
Some cars have been especially successful in Mexico, depending on their cost and viability.

=== Chevrolet Corsa ===
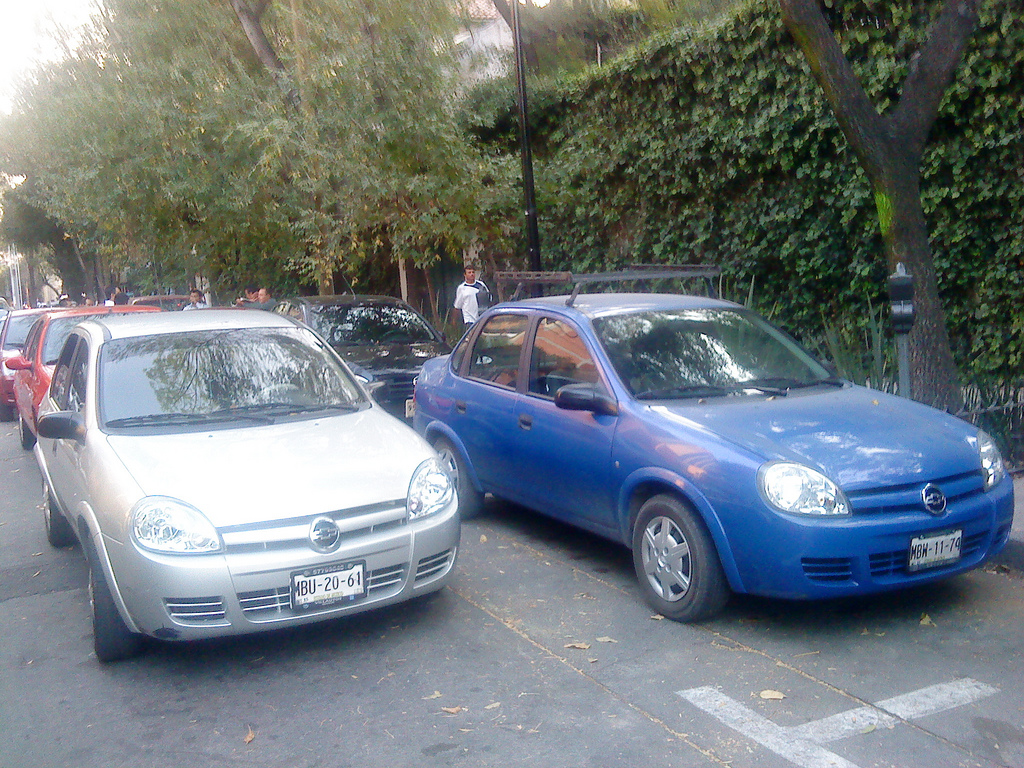
A couple of Chevy sedans in Mexico City

The second-generation Opel Corsa (imported from Spain) was first introduced in Mexico in 1994 under the name "Chevrolet Chevy" as a response to the successful Volkswagen Sedan. General Motors used a practical, supermini with an affordable price tag for the Mexican consumer that gave excellent results. From 1996, when the Chevy Popular or Chevy Pop budget trim was introduced, and the Chevy began to be produced in the Ramos Arizpe GM assembly plant, it replaced the Volkswagen Sedan (Beetle) as the top selling car in Mexico. Chevrolet soon launched the also Mexican made Chevy Monza, similar to the 4-door saloon version of the Chevrolet Classic which is still currently produced in Argentina, for those who wanted a bigger trunk and more room for the same low price. Soon after, Chevrolet launched the also Mexican made Chevy Swing, similar to the 5-door saloon version of the second-generation Opel Corsa Hatchback, and Chevy Joy, similar to the 3-door Chevy Pop, but with more equipment.

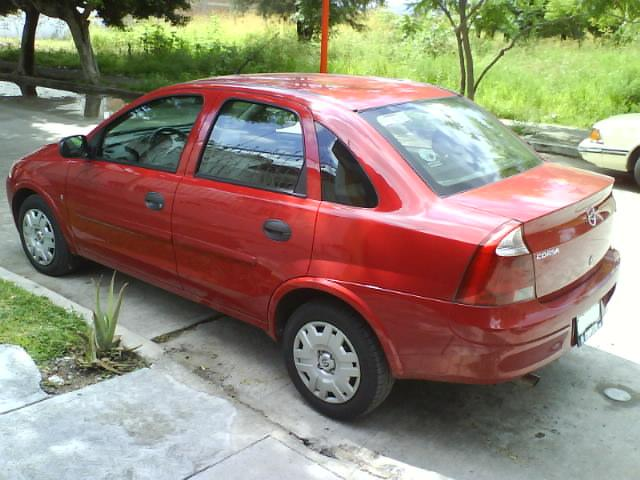
A 2006 Corsa sedan made in Brazil

The design was not changed until 2000 when it was facelifted in Europe with transparent headlights, newer rear lights and a new interior. A Station Wagon imported from Argentina was also launched as the Chevy Wagon, as well as a Brazilian-made pickup variant, launched as the Chevy Pickup. With the introduction of the Corsa III, however, the older Corsa was no longer manufactured in European GM plants. This generation Corsa remained in production in Mexico, Brazil and Argentina. In 2004, Mexican designers redesigned the Chevy inside and out and upgraded the 1.6-liter engine to reach 98 bhp. This newer Chevrolet was called C2 as a reference to the Corvette generations. In July 2008, a facelift designed in Detroit, Michigan was introduced for the new 2009 Chevy, available in 3- and 5-door hatchback, and 4-door sedan bodies.

=== Nissan Tsuru ===
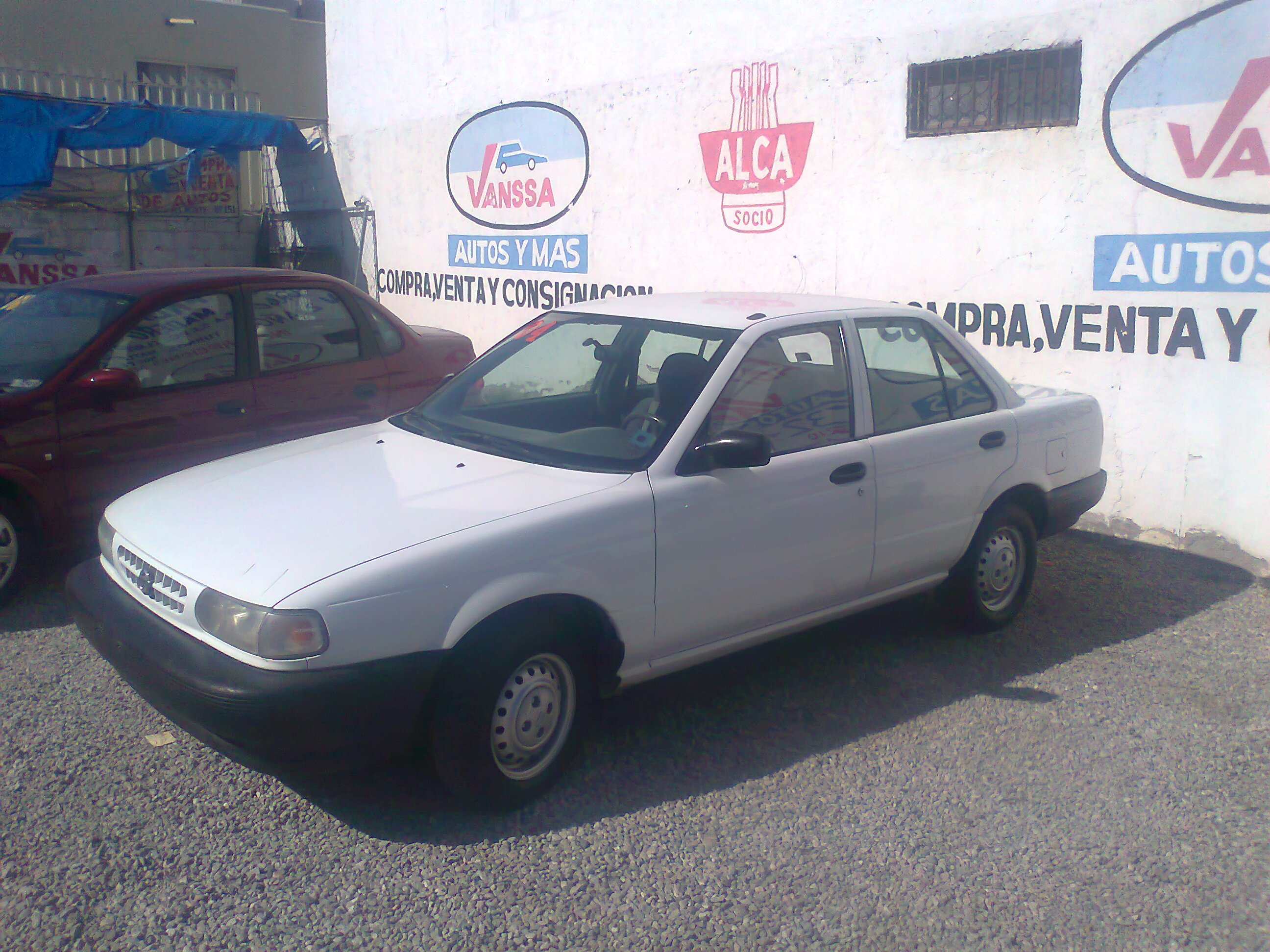
Nissan Tsuru

The Datsun 160J was a mid-size sedan that sold well but did not meet the sales number benchmark set by its successor. In 1983, the first Nissan Sentra was launched as a replacement for the 160J under the name "Tsuru", Japanese for crane. While the Tsuru was quickly accepted by Mexicans as a comfortable and affordable car, it did not replace the VW Sedan as the top-selling car in Mexico.

A second-generation Tsuru was launched in late 1987 as a 1988 model with a more square-shaped and larger design. Neither generation, however, managed to become the best-selling car in Mexico.

The third generation Tsuru (the Sentra III) was introduced in November 1991. This Tsuru featured a more rounded 1990s type design scheme. Soon the third generation Tsuru was known for being powerful and comfortable, yet affordable. With the new Chevrolet Chevy in 1994, however, the Tsuru had a new rival. It didn't take long for it to overtake the Chevy, and, soon after, the Sedan. It reached number 1 in 1998, and it stayed there until 2005, with the Volkswagen Pointer. The Renault-based Nissan Platina was thought to be its successor, but the incredible sales ranking of the Tsuru kept the Platina as another option. The Platina remained in the top 10 until it was discontinued in 2010, alongside its hatchback counterpart, the Clio.

The Tsuru remains the most popular choice for city (but not for highway due to a lack of stability) taxicab drivers in Mexico (airport and hotel taxis usually drive higher end vehicles, such as Audi), along with the MkIII. It is currently the longest-running car in terms of consecutive years sold in Mexico in the century (18 years), ended only by concerns over crash safety and emissions.

=== Volkswagen Jetta (Volkswagen Clásico from 2010 to 2015) ===
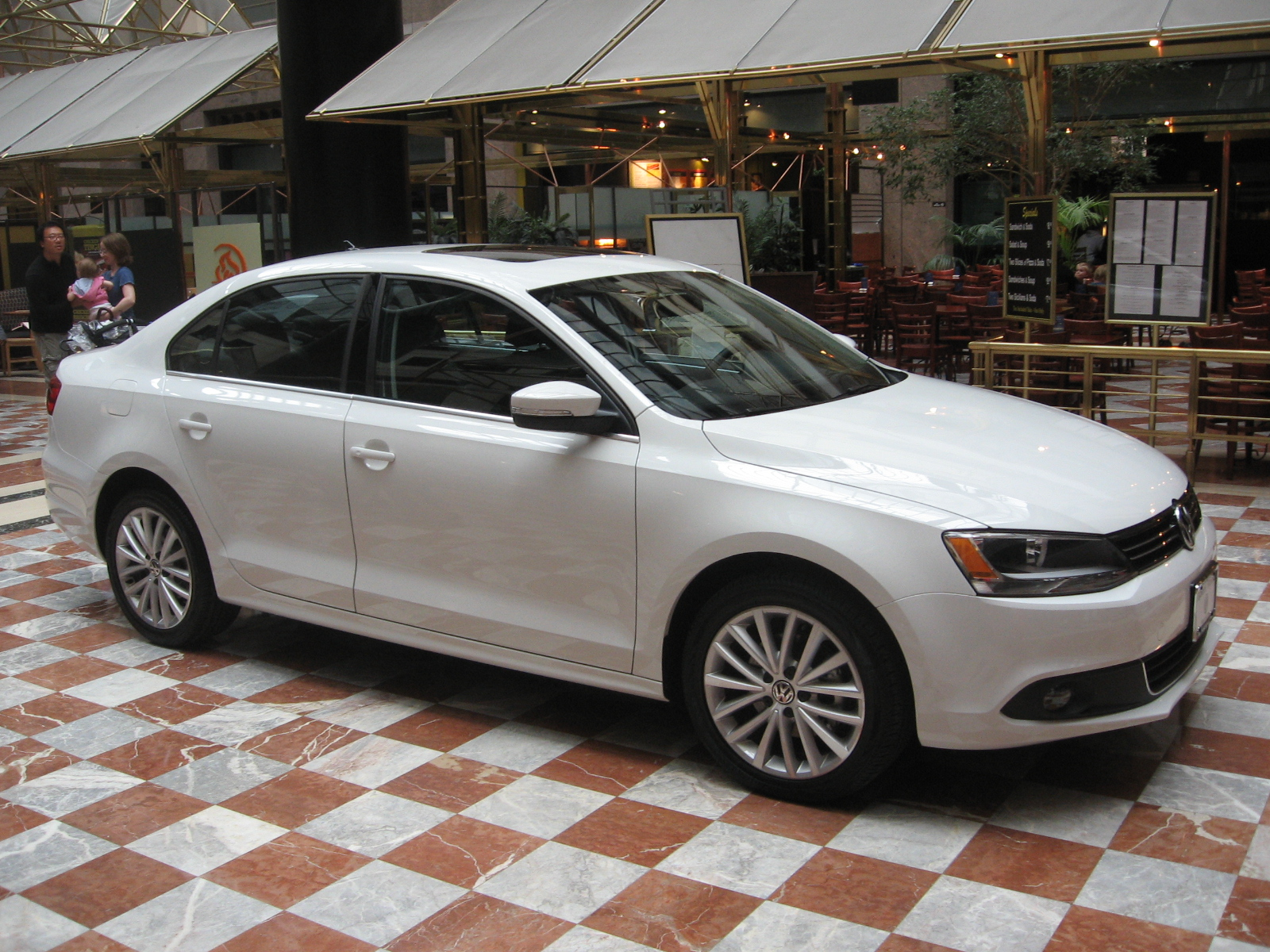
2010 Volkswagen Jetta Europa

The first Jetta was renamed Atlantic for the Mexican market. It sold well, so Volkswagen decided to start manufacturing it in their factory in Puebla. In late 1998, the fourth generation Jetta (called Bora in Europe) reached Mexico. The car showed off a new design, which did not appeal initially to Mexicans. However, good marketing tactics and phrases like "No cambies, evoluciona" (Don't change, evolve) resulted in a quick change of opinion, and for the first time, a mid-sized vehicle made it into Mexico's top 10 sellers list; the Jetta became a big hit and ranked as the fourth best-seller. The catch phrase "Todo mundo tiene un Jetta, al menos en la cabeza" (Everyone has a Jetta, at least in their mind) became a reality or so it seems as it is quite common to see many Jetta's driving nearby on the streets. The car's success was such that it was not replaced in 2005 by the Jetta V, which adopted the Bora moniker, so the Jetta IV continued to be offered for sale. Both cars achieved even greater success in their later years: Jetta IV placed number one for a month in June 2009, and Bora has stayed among the top five since 2008. A redesigned Jetta was released in 2009 and advertised with a new slogan: "Porque el corazón no da explicaciones" (Because the heart gives no reasons).

On July 22, 2010, the sixth generation Jetta was released. As of August 2010, Mexico was the only country in the world where fourth, fifth and sixth generation Jetta's were being sold at the same time. Bora left the dealerships in late 2010, but Jetta IV was still being offered afterwards due to its high sales. Incidentally, Volkswagen changed this version's moniker to simply Clásico (Spanish for "classic"). The Volkswagen Clásico sold very well until the 2015 model, which was the year it was discontinued, with the new Indian-built Vento taking its place.

=== Volkswagen Sedan ===
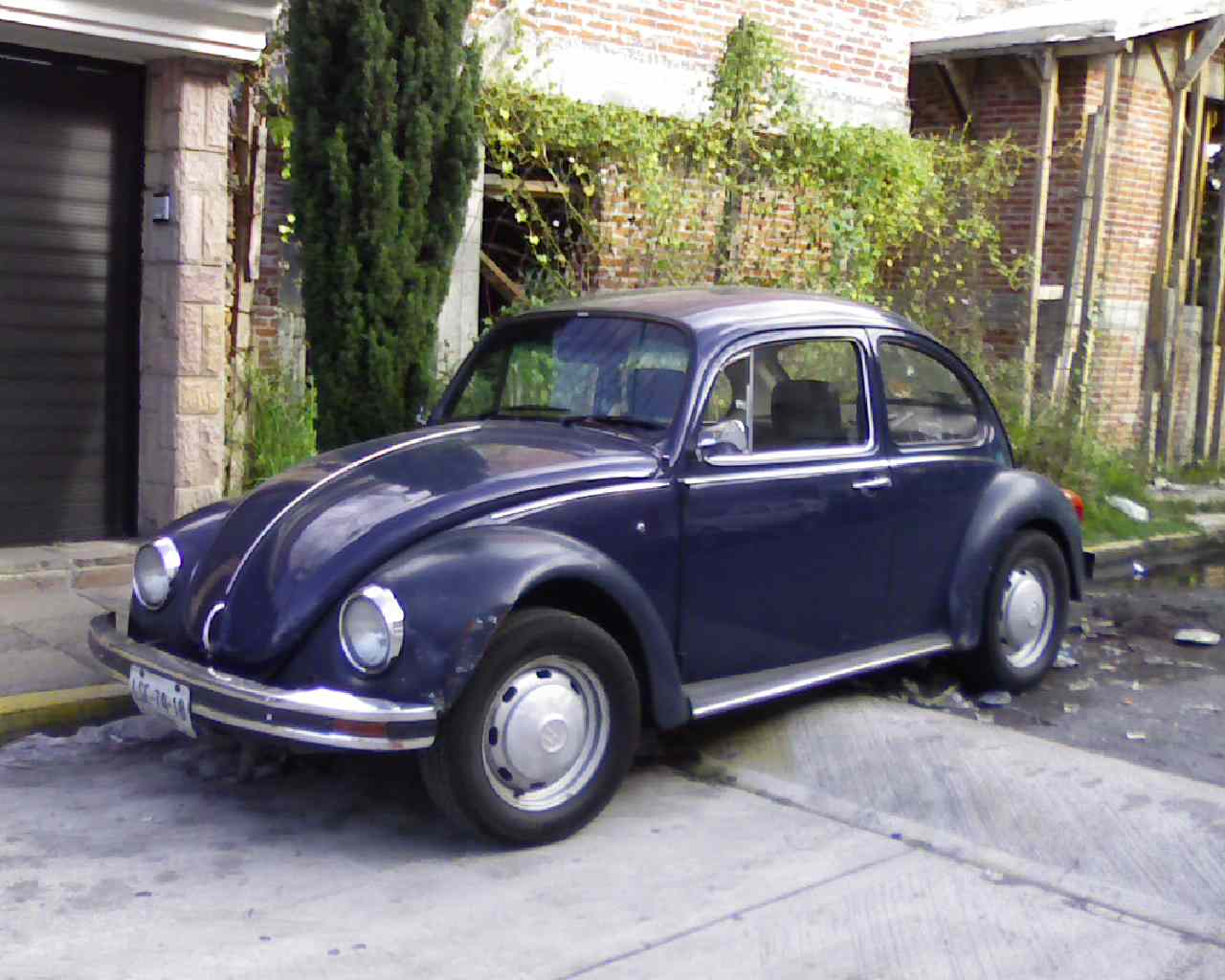
A Volkswagen Sedan.

The first Volkswagen car sold in Mexico was the 1954 Beetle, called Sedan in this country. The popularity of the Beetle led VW to build their own factory in the state of Puebla. In the early 80s, Mexico and Brazil were the only countries producing the Beetle (Sedan in Mexico, Fusca in Brazil), so many foreign enthusiasts used to import the car and keep it as a collectible vehicle. Brazil stopped producing the Fusca in 1997, and Mexico became the sole producer until 2003.

Volkswagen broadcast a minute-long farewell TV advertisement with people waving goodbye to the Sedan as it made its way through the avenue. On July 30, 2003, the last Beetle came out from the Puebla factory, closing a chapter in automobile history. The 3000th last edition Sedan was given to Pope John Paul II and now resides in the Volkswagen museum in Germany.

== Companies with official brands in Mexico ==
This is a brief history of the car makers in this country.

=== Audi ===
Audi operates a car factory at San José Chiapa, Puebla with a capacity of 150,000 units per year, including the Q5. Some parts are exported to China and India.

=== Aston Martin ===
Aston Martin entered the Mexican auto market in 2014 with the opening of their first dealership in Mexico City located in the Polanco neighborhood.

=== Bayerische Motoren Werke AG ===
Brands BMW and Mini.

See: BMW Mexico

=== Chrysler Group, LLC ===
Brands Chrysler, Dodge and Jeep; and vehicles by Hyundai (until 2014).

Chrysler entered Mexico around 1937. In the 1960s, the company was renamed Automex. Then in the 1970s, their name changed again to Chrysler de México. The latest models are launched just after those in the United States are launched. Chrysler markets several brands including Dodge, Chrysler, Jeep, Smart, Maybach, and Mitsubishi (in partnership). They sold Hyundai passenger cars, cargo vans, and passenger vans under a "by Dodge" badge. This was because Hyundai had no official representation in the Mexican auto market until 2014. Strangely enough, the Dodge Ramcharger 2-door SUV was very popular in the Mexican market. Chrysler even developed a version of the Ramcharger based on the 1994 Ram (not offered in the US) due to the popularity of 2-door SUVs in Mexico and the lack of market in the US.

For many years, Dodge vehicles were sometimes rebadged as Chryslers, for example, the Neon, Stratus, Intrepid, Shadow and Spirit.

=== First Automotive Works ===
Brands FAW.

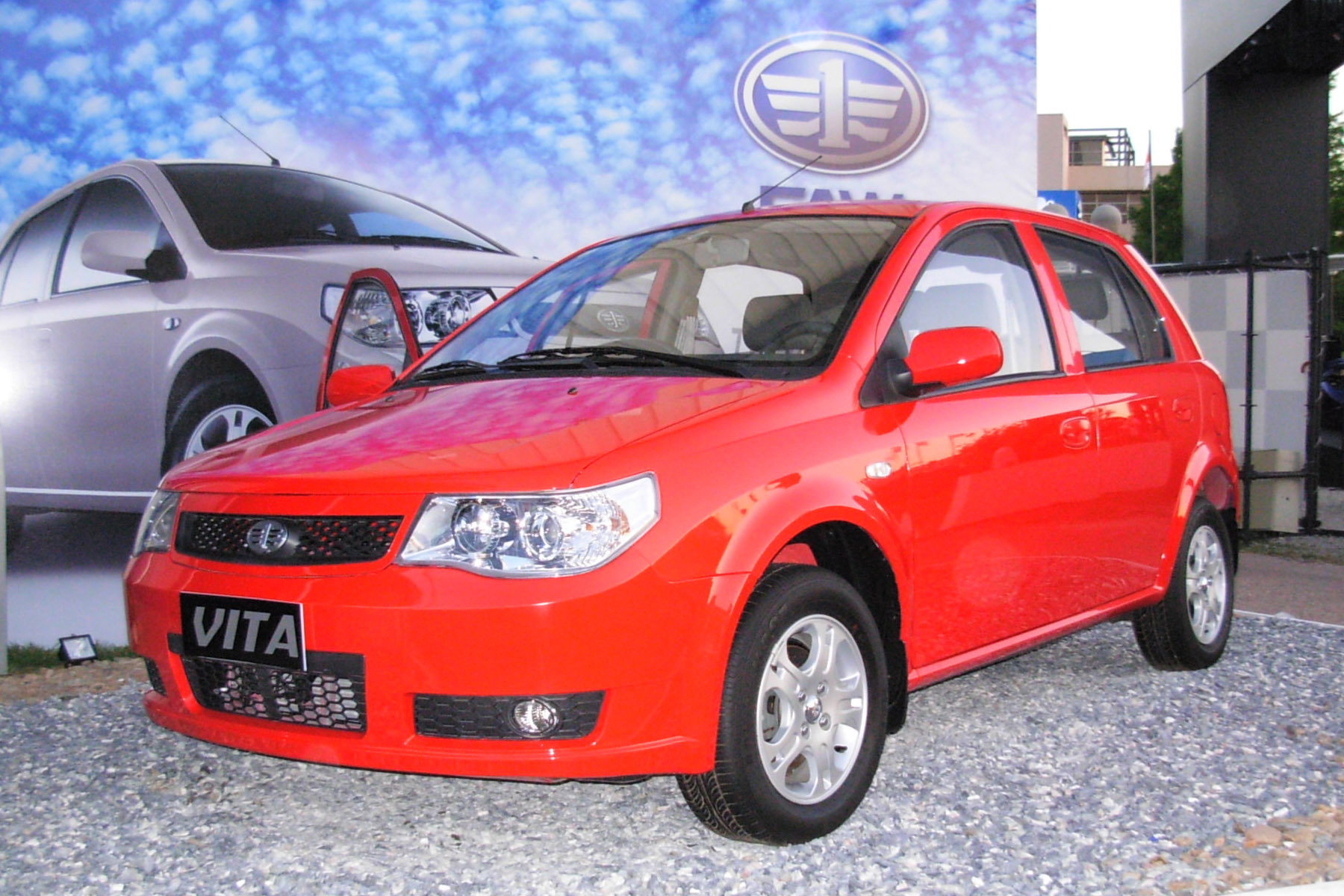
In spite of offering the least expensive vehicles in Mexico, FAW saw extremely low sales after its first arrival, amounting to less than 2,300 nationwide as of 2010.

The first Chinese car maker in Mexico was introduced in January 2008 through the Elektra convenience stores, owned by Grupo Salinas. Although the F1 is the least expensive automobile in the country, FAW received very poor sales in comparison with popular brands such as GM, Volkswagen and Nissan. While some critics dismissed FAW due to its origin and the main purpose of offering an economy product, others supported it by showing videos recorded during the Euro NCAP tests for the F5. Its latest slogan was "impulsa tus sueños" (impulse your dreams), and it was marketed towards people unable to afford an expensive car. FAW initially planned to construct a factory in Mexico capable of producing over 100,000 vehicles annually; however, after the company saw the poor initial sales, they cancelled the plan. FAW has since left Mexico, but thanks to Great Wall Motors, it still is operating today under its commercial vehicle division.

=== Fiat S.p.A. ===
Brands Ferrari, Fiat and Maserati.

Fiat re-entered Mexico in 2004 in collaboration with General Motors, before its commercial rupture. Fiat hadn't achieved much sales success due to having only one model for sale until the beginning of 2006. Upon its introduction, the Punto was a big hit for the carmaker.

Ferrari entered the country in 1998 with the F355 Spider. The Enzo Ferrari arrived in early 2004 at the former dealership at Avenida de los Insurgentes (now Alfa Romeo taking its place) in Mexico City with a price of $1,285,000 US dollars. Five units were sold. Furthermore, Ferrari chose Tuxtla Gutiérrez, Chiapas to test its F430 in 2004 before it came out. Curiously, they are the only carmaker to offer their entire catalogue in Mexico.

=== Ford Motor Company ===
Brands Ford, Lincoln, Mercury and Volvo.

Ford Motor Company de México had excellent sales during the 1950s, '60s and '70s, before being overtaken by General Motors. It used to hold the second place in sales. For several decades, Ford sold various successful Mercury models under a Ford badge, most notoriously the Mercury Zephyr as the Ford Elite II (with a Ford Granada front end), Grand Marquis, Cougar, Topaz (an upmarket Ford Tempo), Villager and Ghia (an upmarket Mercury Topaz).

From 1996, Lincoln dealerships became Lincoln-Mercury dealerships selling both brands.

For a time, the hot hatch Focus ST was the only hatchback Focus available in Mexico. It offers a 2.5i 5-cylinder engine like the European versions—Mexico being the only country in America in which Ford offers this European version (imported from Germany). Family versions were released with two trim levels and a 2.0i petrol engine. This is not the same as the Ford Focus sold in the United States, which is based on the original 1998–2005 version.

The European Ford Mondeo appeared in 2003, although it was different from the mainland Europe version; being more luxurious, it sold for approximately £20,000 for a 2.0i model.

Their successful Ikon (sedan version of the Fiesta II) remained a favourite for low income families, sharing similar success with the next generation model in 2005, the Fiesta III Sedan. However, it is the Brazilian EcoSport compact SUV which now holds the Ford's best seller title.

The Mustang remains quite popular with men in their 20s and 30s.

In 2010, the Taurus badge returned to Mexico after a 12-year absence, and was discontinued thereafter.

Ford has two factories in Mexico, producing around 400,000 cars per year at Hermosillo, Sonora and Cuautitlán, State of Mexico, mostly for export to US and Canada.

=== General Motors Company ===
Brands Buick, Cadillac, Chevrolet and GMC and vehicles by Opel and Holden.

General Motors was the sales leader in Mexico until 2009, when Nissan overtook GM. From the early '60s to the early '90s, Chevrolet was the only brand available, even in the '90s when GM sold Buicks and Oldsmobiles under the Chevrolet brand (e.g. the Buick Century as the Chevrolet Century Limited and the Oldsmobile Cutlass Ciera as the Chevrolet Cutlass and Chevrolet Eurosport). GMC models were also previously sold as Chevrolets in Mexico, until its official introduction in the Mexican auto market in 2005. Chevrolet was one of the first carmakers to establish itself in Mexico. The second formal GM brand to re-enter the market was Cadillac in 1991. Then more brands came throughout the decade. GM now markets several brands like Buick, Chevrolet, Cadillac and GMC.

The first Opel car in Mexico was the Rekord produced in the '60s. The carmaker retired from the country from 1972 until 1994, the year GM introduced the Opel Corsa under the name Chevrolet Chevy. Opel vehicles are currently sold under the Buick brand name in Mexico. The success of the Chevrolet Chevy (C2 redesigned in Mexico) kept GM ranked as the number one seller from 1995 until 2009.

GM introduced the Caprice and Lumina to the Mexican market again in the late 1990s, and turned massive profits off of those vehicles, where the Caprice is a popular taxi and police car. Chevrolet stopped importing the Lumina in 2013, which its slots were filled by the Malibu, Silverado (known in Cheyenne in this market), Camaro, and SS. The Caprice's slot was then filled by the Impala and Malibu in 2017.

GM introduced the previous Daewoo Matiz to Mexico under the name Pontiac Matiz, but shortly after Pontiac's discontinuation, the Matiz was sold under the Chevrolet logo in Europe. With the G3 and Aveo, GM offered the same model in Mexico as the Saturn models in the United States.

The Hummer H1 was available for the Mexican Army through the '90s. With the late 2007 scandal involving former president Vicente Fox (portraying him as the owner of diverse vehicles from unknown funds, notably a Hummer), jokes referring to the Hummer brand became popular throughout the country. After the Pontiac brand stopped production of all cars in late 2010 as GM announced, Buick was reintroduced to replace Pontiac in the Mexican market and become GMC's partner brand as most dealerships in Mexico are GMC-Pontiac.

Saab had a reputation similar to Volvo's. Both brands are respected for their safety concept and Swedish design. They left the country in 2010 due to Spyker buying out the firm, except for Volvo, which returned to the market a few years later after its absence.

The Cadillac Catera became a successful model in Mexico during the '90's. Nowadays, the Escalade is the top selling Cadillac.

=== Honda Motor Company, Ltd. ===
Brands Acura and Honda.

HCL - Honda Celaya Plant

=== Hyundai Motor Company ===
Brands Hyundai and Kia.

Hyundai Motors de México entered the Mexican market in 2014 with the Grand i10, Elantra, and the ix35. Soon afterwards, the Sonata joined the lineup. Prior to the introduction of the Hyundai brand for non-commercial vehicles, Hyundai passenger vehicles, light-duty cargo vans, and passenger vans were distributed by Chrysler de México, branded as Dodge until 2014.

=== Isuzu ===
Isuzu Motors de México started operations in November 2005, thanks to the Economic Partnership Agreement that had been signed by Mexico and Japan. Isuzu is the first Japanese commercial vehicle manufacturer to enter Mexico, and it is a joint venture between Isuzu (51%) and Mitsubishi Corporation (49%). The company started sales with the ELF in 3 different versions: ELF 300 with payload capacity of 3.4 tons, ELF 400 with a 4-ton payload and ELF 450 with a 4.5 ton capacity. Since then the brand has expanded throughout the country, as of 2008 has 27 dealers and started assembly operations for the model ELF 600 in 2009.

GM de México sold an Isuzu pick-up truck as the Chevrolet Luv, imported from Chile (GM Chile). There was a Single Cab and a Crew Cab 4x2 model with a 2.3 cc Petrol engine. It was the first South American compact truck (before the Ford Ranger and Toyota Hilux from Argentina).

=== Jaguar Land Rover ===
Brands Jaguar and Land Rover.

The X-Type is the most successful Jaguar in the country with a price of US$40,000. Less than 1000 Jaguars are sold per year however as the company has faced stiff competition from Mercedes-Benz and BMW, which have domestic manufacturing facilities in Mexico. The SUV maker Land Rover is very popular among the middle and high classes in Mexico. The LR3 and the Freelander are the most successful models.

=== Mazda ===
Mazda was introduced in Mexico in November 2005 with the release of the then current Mazda3 and Mazda6 models.

While it was pretty common to spot imported B2000 pick-ups and 626 sedans on the streets, Mazda vehicles were virtually unknown in Mexico. When the Mazda3 was introduced, both hatchback and notchback versions became a success among youngsters.

Throughout 2007 and 2008, Mazda fulfilled most of its clients' requests by presenting the MPV Mazda5, the SUVs CX-7 and CX-9, and the popular roadster, the Miata, rebadged MX-5. Though the Coupe, the RX-8, had been considered, the modifications needed to achieve good performance in the Valley of Mexico led to the idea being dropped. The only RX-8 delivered by Mazda Motor de México to an individual was raffled by Mazda itself in 2008.

The new generation Mazda3 and the CX-7 have kept Mazda among the most successful brands in Mexico; Mazda6 and MX-5 maintain regular sales, while Mazda5 and CX-9 have the weakest.

=== McLaren Automotive ===
McLaren Automotive entered the Mexican market in 2015 by opening its first dealership in the capital city Mexico City (Santa Fe). One year later, they opened a second dealership in León, Guanajuato to serve León and the rest of the bajio region.

=== Mercedes-Benz ===
See: Mercedes-Benz Mexico

=== PSA Peugeot Citroën ===
Brands Peugeot, Opel and a vehicle by Citroën.

Peugeot returned to Mexico in 1997 with the 306 Saloon. The 206 has had very good sales despite having the Renault Clio as a tough competitor. Peugeots rank high in sales mostly because of their design.

=== Renault–Nissan–Mitsubishi Alliance (Renault S.A., Mitsubishi Motors and Nissan Motor Company, Ltd.) ===
Brands Nissan, Mitsubishi and Renault, and vehicles by Dacia, Infiniti and Samsung.

Nissan is the most sold car manufacturer in Mexico, particularly due to its model Tsuru II, whose driveline currently uses Renault-sourced parts, which are locally manufactured. This car is especially prized by taxicab companies for being affordable (around $131,000 MXN or $9500 USD). This has kept it in the most common sales position since the 90s, hence maintaining its success in the country. Through the Renault-Nissan Alliance, Nissan Mexicana have designed the Nissan Platina, based on the Renault Clio Symbol, and have sold the Dacia Logan (made by Renault Brazil) as the Nissan Aprio. Nissan also sells one Infiniti model.

First established in 1959, Renault was quite successful in Mexico during the late 70s and early 80s with their R5 (nicknamed "zapatito" or "little shoe") and R12. The French pronunciation of the marque was mis-conceived as "Reh-nol", "Roh-nol" and even "Roh-ñol". Renault's Mexican assembly was carried out by DINA S.A. Renault remained successful until 1986, when it left the country due to financial reasons.

Following in the footsteps of Peugeot, Renault returned to Mexico in late 1999 via the Mexican Auto Show (then Autoexpo) of 1999, where they offered the first generation Mégane Scénic's (or simply Scénic) for test-drives — a model seen for the first time at the Auto Show. This vehicle, known for being the first mid-size MPV, was introduced in 2000 and was received warmly by the Mexican buyers. The small family sedan Mégane followed the next year, along with their best seller Clio's sporty version, the Clio II Renault Sport. Regarding the success of the hot hatch, Renault decided to present for sale in Mexico their own Mexican-made Clio II, featuring the 2001 restyling (though the 1998 type original dashboard remained), dark gray rims and a unique 1.6i—mounted on other Renaults in order to resist Mexico's central states' heights. The Nissan factory in the city of Aguascalientes was used for the assembly of the Clio, the Platina (Nissan's Clio sedan version) and, formerly, the previous Scénic. The facelifted Clio was introduced in late 2006 featuring a new front and rear end and new interior design (from the European 2001 version). It was planned for it to remain on sale, as in most countries, until 2010. Ironically, the Clio outlasted this new Clio II's presence on the Mexican market. It is now one of the two remaining French Renault models, since the Mégane II hatch production ended in Spain. Korean Koleos, Safrane, and Fluence, and the Colombian Sandero were expected to replace all French models by 2012.

Mitsubishi entered Mexico in 2003 with the previous Galant and Montero. Mitsubishi has had great success with the SUVs Endeavor and Outlander, and, recently with the Lancer.

=== Subaru ===
Arrived in Mexico in 2006, only through an importer, and by 2016, Subaru arrived officially as a brand to Mexico opening corporative offices in Mexico City.

=== Suzuki ===
Suzuki came to Mexico in 2005 thanks to the free trade agreement between Japan and Mexico in October of that year. The first dealer began by selling two models: Model year 2006 Grand Vitara V6 and the four-door Aerio. The current dealer network consists of 40 agencies spanning the length and breadth of the country. The Grand Vitara is still doing great and inspired Suzuki to import the Swift, which has also been a successful model. As of 2012, Suzuki de México offered a total of five products with many different options: Swift GL MT, GLS MT & GLS AT, SX4 Crossover MT & CVT, SX4 Sedan MT & CVT, Kizashi CVT and Grand Vitara GL AT, Grand Vitara HIMALAYA AT, GLS AT & 4X4 AT.

=== Toyota ===
Toyota officially entered Mexico in July 1959 with the Crown and Land Cruiser and established local assembly of Land Cruisers and large trucks in December 1960. Toyota later withdrew from the Mexican auto market in 1964, and returned in April 2002 with the Camry and Corolla.

Before its re-entry, the carmaker was already known in the country for the pick-ups and cars imported from the United States. The Tacoma is built in manufacturing plants in Tecate, Tijuana, Baja California and San Antonio, Texas. The Corolla and the RAV4 are very successful in Mexico as in the rest of the world.

=== Volkswagen Group ===
Brands Audi, Bentley, Cupra, Lamborghini, SEAT, Porsche and Volkswagen.

Volkswagen is a sales leader in Mexico, just behind Nissan and GM. The commercial success of the Pointer, Jetta and Lupo models have helped Volkswagen's sales. Volkswagen hasn't introduced the ultra-luxury brand Bugatti in Mexico (which may only be bought through specialist car dealers in major cities such as Mexico City with reports of at least 2 Bugatti being imported from the US), however, even though Audi and Bentley are selling very well in Mexico, they are not as common as VW due to the fact they are more expensive. Lamborghini de Mexico officially entered the Mexican car market in 2010 with the opening of a dealership in Mexico City.

Audis are very popular amongst Mexican youths and businesspeople. The most successful models are the A4 sedan and the A3 Sportback.

The Spanish carmaker SEAT arrived in Mexico in 2001 with the Ibiza. The brand has been very successful with the strong sellers being the Ibiza and the León (new 1.4 and 1.8 TSi variants have been recently introduced). The Seat Córdoba was also produced the very next year in the Volkswagen assembly plant in Puebla, as the 2.0 Tiptronic variant.

Volkswagen was introduced in Mexico in 1954 with the offering of the popular Beetle. A major investor in the Volkswagen de Mexico dealership was Prince Alfonso of Hohenlohe-Langenburg. The Type 1 was officially called Sedan and commonly called "Vocho" as an abbreviation of Volkswagen.

Volkswagen recently introduced the Jetta TDi with a 1.9 Diesel engine. It is the second diesel-engineered car in Mexico since the Volkswagen Caribe Diesel (1979–1983), which was slow-selling in this country. Unfortunately, the sales of the Jetta TDi (unlike the huge number of sales of the 2.0i edition) have been small, encouraging its end in this country. VW is trying to convince government and environmental authorities of the advantages of using diesel and to encourage the reduction of taxes and other stimuli to increase the sales of the TDi.

VW has factories in Cuautlancingo (in Puebla) and Silao, Guanajuato, and uses rail, trucks and the ports of Veracruz and Lázaro Cárdenas, Michoacán for imports and exports.

Porsche is also sold in Mexico, although it is supplied directly by Porsche and not through VW due to the fact Porsche was once an independent company before it was bought by VW and VW has not yet merged the two supply chains.

== Mainstream carmakers ==
Notes:

- If a car's retiring year reads 2021 and its availability cell is colored green, it means no more units will be produced nor imported, but the last units are still on sale.
- If a car has no retiring year marked but its availability cell is colored red, it means either that car is in the middle of a restyling, or the maker is waiting for new units to arrive.
- No future dates shall be given.
- Family, executive and leisure cars are found below in the following Mexican body configurations: microauto (microcar), auto de ciudad (city car), subcompacto (supermini), compacto (small family car), mediano (large family car), lujo (executive car), minivan (MPV by size), SUV (by size), pick-up (by size), van (small LAV), van mediana (light van), and van larga (van). Sport cars are found on the lower part of each table following the same format and including (if any): roadster and Coupe. Convertibles may not be considered sport cars.
- Blue link/text indicates a car whose brand and name are/were the same as the original model.
- Green link/text indicates a car whose name is/was different from its original market.
- Gamboge link/text indicates a car whose brand is/was different from its original market.
- Dark red link/text indicates a car whose brand and name are/were different from its original market.

=== (Japan) Acura ===
Name	Body	Introduced	Retired	Engine	Transmission options	Origin	Available?
TSX	Sedan	2009	2014	I4 2.4i 240 hp	M	(Japan) Sayama, Saitama	No
TL III	Sedan	2005	2008	V6 3.2i 258 hp	M	(United States) Marysville, Ohio	No
TL IV	Sedan	2008	2014	V6 3.5i 280 hp	M	(United States) Marysville, Ohio	No
TL IV	Sedan	2008	2014	V6 3.7i 305 hp	M	(United States) Marysville, Ohio	No
RL II	Sedan	2005	2012	V6 3.7i 305 hp	M		No
RDX	SUV	2006		Turbo 2.0 L	A	(United States) East Liberty, Ohio	Yes
MDX	SUV	2007		3.0 L J-Series V6 (turbo, Type-S); 3.5 L J-Series V6		(Canada) East Liberty, Ohio	Yes
ILX	Sedan	2013		1.5 L LDA/LEA15 I4 2.0 L R20A I4 2.4 L K24Z7 I4 2.4 L K24V7 I4 (2016-)	5-speed automatic (2013–15) 6-speed manual (2013–15) 8-speed dual-clutch (2016–present)	Greensburg, Indiana, United States (Honda Manufacturing of Indiana) (April 2012 - November 2014) Marysville, Ohio (Marysville Auto Plant) (2015–present)	Yes
NSX	Sports Coupe	2017		3492 cc JNC1 twin turbo V6	9-speed dual-clutch	Marysville, Ohio, United States (Performance Manufacturing Center)	Yes
TLX	Sedan	2015		2.0 L K20C6 turbo I4 (UB5/6); 3.0 L J30AC turbo V6 (Type-S)	10-speed automatic	Marysville, Ohio, U.S. (Marysville Auto Plant)	Yes

=== (Italy) Alfa Romeo ===
==== Current ====
- Giulia
- Stelvio

==== Discontinued ====
- 8C Competizione (by special order only)
- 147
- 159
- GT
- Brera
- Giulietta (2011-2020)

=== (Germany) Audi (1997–present) ===
Name	Body	Introduced	Retired	Engine/Battery	Transmission options	Origin	Available?
A1	Hatchback	2010		1.0 L EA211/EA211 DHSB TFSI I3; 1.5 L EA211 EVO series TFSI I4; 2.0 L EA888 TFSI I4	M/S tronic	(Spain) Martorell	Yes
A3 Typ 8L	Hatchback	1997	2004		M	(Germany) Ingolstadt, Bavaria	No
A3 Typ 8P	Hatchback	2005	2012		M	(Germany) Ingolstadt, Bavaria (Belgium) Brussels	No
A3 Typ 8P Sportback	Station Wagon	2006	2012		M	(Germany) Ingolstadt, Bavaria (Belgium) Brussels	No
A3 Typ 8P Cabriolet	Convertible	2008	2013		M	(Belgium) Brussels	No
A3 Typ 8V Saloon	Saloon	2013	May 2020		6-speed manual; 6-speed (S-Tronic) automatic; 7-speed (S-Tronic) automatic		No
A3 Typ 8Y Saloon	Saloon	October 2020			6-speed manual 7-speed S-tronic	Germany: Ingolstadt (Audi AG Werk Ingolstadt)	Yes
A4 B5	Notchback	1997	2001		M		No
A4 B5 Avant	Station Wagon	1997	2001		M		No
A4 B6	Notchback	2001	2005		M		No
A4 B6 Cabriolet	Convertible	2003	2006		M		No
A4 B7	Notchback	2006	2008		M		No
A4 B8	Notchback	2008	2015		M		No
A4 B9	Saloon	2016			6-speed manual 7-speed S-tronic 8-speed Tiptronic		Yes
A5 B8	Coupe	2009	2016		M		No
A5 B8 Sportback	Fastback	2009	2016		M		Yes
A5	Coupe	2016			6-speed manual 7-speed S-Tronic dual-clutch automatic 8-speed tiptronic automatic (A5 3.0 TDI & S5 & RS5)	Germany (Audi AG)	Yes
A5 Sportback	Fastback	2016			6-speed manual 7-speed S-Tronic dual-clutch automatic 8-speed tiptronic automatic (A5 3.0 TDI & S5 & RS5)	Germany (Audi AG)	Yes
Q5 Typ 8R	SUV	2008	2017		M	(Germany) Ingolstadt, Bavaria	Yes
Q5 Typ 80A	SUV	2017			8-speed automatic	Mexico: San José Chiapa, Puebla (Audi México, S.A. de C.V.)	Yes
A6 C5	Saloon	1997	2004		M		No
A6 C6	Saloon	2005	2011		M		Yes
A6 C7	Saloon	2011	2018		6-speed manual 8-speed Tiptronic ZF 8HP automatic Multitronic CVT 7-speed S Tronic DCT	Germany: Neckarsulm	No
A6 C8	Saloon	2018			7-speed dual clutch S tronic 8-speed automatic tiptronic	Germany: Neckarsulm	Yes
A7	Fastback	2010			M	Neckarsulm, Germany	Yes
Q7 Typ 4L	SUV	2005	2015		M	(Slovakia) Bratislava	Yes
Q7 Typ 4M	SUV	2015			6-speed automatic 8-speed ZF 8HP Automatic	Slovakia: Bratislava (Volkswagen Bratislava Plant)	Yes
A8 D2	Saloon	1997	2002		M		No
A8 D3	Saloon	2003	2009		M		No
A8 D4	Saloon	2010	2019		M	Germany: Neckarsulm	Yes
A8 D5	Saloon	2019			8-speed Tiptronic automatic 8 Speed Plug-In Hybrid ZF 8HP90 Tiptronic automatic	Germany	Yes
TT Typ 8N	Coupe	2000	2006		M		No
TT Typ 8N	Roadster	2000	2006		M		No
TT Typ 8J	Coupe	2006	2014		M		Yes
TT Typ FV	Coupe	2014			6-speed manual; 6-speed S tronic; 7-speed S tronic (RS only)		Yes
e-tron	SUV	2020		55 quattro, post-update: 95 kWh lithium ion (86.5 kWh usable); 55 quattro: 95 kWh lithium ion (83.6 kWh usable); 50 quattro: 71 kWh lithium ion (64.7 kWh usable)	Single speed with fixed ratio	Belgium: Forest (Audi Brussels)	Yes
S3	Hot hatch	2008		I4 1.8T 222 hp	M	(Germany) Ingolstadt, Bavaria	No
S3 Typ 8L	Hot hatch	2006		I4 2.0T 261 hp	M	(Germany) Ingolstadt, Bavaria	Yes
S4 B6	Saloon	2003	2004	V8 4.2S 339 hp	M	(Germany) Ingolstadt, Bavaria	No
S4 B7	Saloon	2005	2007	V8 4.2S 339 hp	M	(Germany) Ingolstadt, Bavaria	No
S4 B8	Saloon	2008		V6 3.0S 329 hp	M	(Germany) Ingolstadt, Bavaria	Yes
S5 B8	Coupe	2010			M	(Germany) Ingolstadt, Bavaria	Yes
RS5 B8	Coupe	2010			M	(Germany) Ingolstadt, Bavaria	Yes
S6 C6	Saloon	2007		V10 5.2S 429 hp	M	(Germany) Ingolstadt, Bavaria	Yes
RS6 C5	Saloon	2003	2004	V8 4.2T 444 hp			No
S8 D2	Saloon				No		
R8	Coupe	2009		V8 4.2i 414 hp	M	(Germany) Neckarsulm, Baden-Württemberg	Yes
R8	Coupe	2010		V10 5.2i 518 hp	M	(Germany) Neckarsulm, Baden-Württemberg	Yes

=== (United Kingdom) Bentley (2008–present) ===
Name	Body	Introduced	Retired	Engine(s)	Transmission(s)	Origin	Available?
Mulsanne	Saloon	2011	2020	V8 6.8i 530 hp	M	(England) Crewe, Cheshire	Yes
Continental GT	Coupe	2008	2010	W12 6.0i 602 hp	M	(England) Crewe, Cheshire	No
Continental GT II	Coupe	2011	2018	W12 6.0i 602 hp	M	(England) Crewe, Cheshire	Yes
Continental GT III	Coupe	2018				England: Crewe (Bentley Crewe)	Yes
Continental Flying Spur	Saloon	2008	2013	W12 6.0i 602 hp	M	(England) Crewe, Cheshire	Yes
Flying Spur II	Saloon	2013	2019				No
Flying Spur III	Saloon	2019					Yes
Bentayga	SUV	2016				United Kingdom: Crewe	Yes

=== (Germany) BMW (1997–present) ===
- 1 Series The 120i and 130i are available in 3- and 5-door Hatchback, 125i and 135i are available as Coupe. The 1 series Convertible is scheduled to be introduced next December
- 3 Series The 325i and 335i are available as Sedan, Coupe and Convertible
- 5 Series The 525i, 530i, and 550i are available only as Sedan
- 6 Series The 650i is available as Coupe and Convertible
- 7 Series The 750i is available in short- and long-wheelbase bodies, while the 760i is available only as a long-wheelbase sedan
- M3 Available as Sedan and Coupe
- M5 Available as Sedan only
- M6 Available as Coupe and Convertible
- X3 2.5 and 3.0 variants are available
- X5 3.0 and 4.8 variants are available as 5 or 7-seater SUV
- X6 3.0i, 4.8i
- Z4; 2.0i, 3.0i
- Z4 M Coupe

=== (United States) Cadillac (1991–present) ===
==== Current ====
- Escalade (2001–present)
- XT6 (2019–present)
- XT5 (2016–present)
- XT4 (2019–present)

==== Discontinued ====
- BLS
- CTS
- STS
- SRX
- XLR

=== (United States) Chevrolet (1923–present) ===
Name	Body	Introduced	Retired	Engine	Transmission options	Origin	Available?
Spark	Hatchback	2010		I4 1.2 80 hp	S		Yes
Chevy	Hatchback	1994		I4 1.6 100 hp	S/A	(Mexico) Ramos Arizpe, Coahuila	Yes
Monza	Notchback	1996		I4 1.6 100 hp	S/A	(Mexico) Ramos Arizpe, Coahuila	Yes
Chevy	Station Wagon	1996	2002	I4 1.6 100 hp	S/A	(Mexico) Ramos Arizpe, Coahuila	No
Aveo	Notchback	2008		I4 1.6 110 hp	S/A	(Mexico) San Luis Potosí, San Luis Potosí	Yes
Corsa C	Hatchback	2002	2005	I4 1.4 89 hp	S/A	(Brazil) São Caetano do Sul, São Paulo	No
Corsa C	Notchback	2002	2008	I4 1.8 123 hp	S/A	(Brazil) São Caetano do Sul, São Paulo	No
Optra	Notchback	2008	2010	I4 1.8 120 hp	S		No
Cruze	Notchback	2010			S/A		Yes
Astra G	Hatchback	2001	2005		S/A		No
Astra G	Sedan	2001	2005		S/A		No
Astra G	Station Wagon	2001	2003		S/A		No
Astra H	Hatchback	2006	2008		S/A		No
Astra H	Sedan	2006	2008		S/A	(Poland) Gliwice	No
Epica	Saloon	2007	2008		A		No
Malibu IV	Saloon	1978	1983			(Mexico) Ramos Arizpe, Coahuila	No
Malibu IV	Coupe	1978	1983			(Mexico) Ramos Arizpe, Coahuila	No
Malibu V	Saloon	1997	2003				No
Malibu VI	Saloon	2005	2007			(United States) Kansas City, Kansas	No
Malibu VII	Saloon	2008					Yes
HHR	SUV	2006	2009			(Mexico) Ramos Arizpe, Coahuila	No
Camaro IV	Coupe	1993	2002	V6 3.4 160 hp	S/A	(Canada) Sainte-Thérèse, Quebec	No
Camaro V	Coupe	2010		V8 6.2 426 hp	S/A	(Canada) Oshawa, Ontario	Yes
Corvette C5	Coupe	1997	2005	V8 5.7 350 hp	S	(United States) Bowling Green, Kentucky	No
Corvette C6	Coupe	2006		V8 6.2 426 hp	A	(United States) Bowling Green, Kentucky	Yes

- Captiva
- Uplander
- Traverse
- Tahoe (marketed as Chevrolet Sonora prior to 2006)
- Suburban
- Tornado (Corsa MkIII Pick-up version)
- Colorado
- Cheyenne
- Silverado
- Avalanche

=== (United States) Chrysler (1929–present) ===
- PT Cruiser
- Cirrus III
- 300C
- Town & Country
- Aspen

=== (United States) Dodge (1928–present) ===
- Atos
- Attitude
- Caliber
- Avenger
- Journey
- Durango
- Nitro
- Dakota
- Ram
- H100
- Charger; Daytona, SRT-8
- Challenger; V6, SRT-8
- Viper; SRT-10
- Vision

=== (China) FAW (2008–2010) ===
Name	Body	Introduced	Retired	Engine(s)	Transmission(s)	Origin	Available?
F1	Hatchback	2008	2010	I3 1.0i 65 hp	S	(China) Changchun, Jilin	No
F4	Notchback	2008	2010	I3 1.0i 65 hp	S	(China) Changchun, Jilin	No
F5	Hatchback	2008	2010	I4 1.5i 101 hp	S	(China) Changchun, Jilin	No
F5	Notchback	2008	2010	I4 1.5i 101 hp	S	(China) Changchun, Jilin	No

=== (Italy) Ferrari (1998–present) ===
Name	Body	Introduced	Retired	Engine	Transmission options	Origin	Available?
California	Coupe-cabrio	2009		V8 4.3i 453 hp	S	(Italy) Maranello, Emilia-Romagna	Yes
360 Módena	Coupe	1999	2005	V8 3.6i 400 hp	S	(Italy) Maranello, Emilia-Romagna	No
360 Spider	Cabrio	1999	2005	V8 3.6i 400 hp	S	(Italy) Maranello, Emilia-Romagna	No
360 Challenge Stradale	Coupe	2004	2005	V8 3.6i 420 hp	S	(Italy) Maranello, Emilia-Romagna	No
F430 Coupe	Coupe	2005		V8 4.3i 490 hp	S	(Italy) Maranello, Emilia-Romagna	Yes
F430 Spider	Spider	2005		V8 4.3i 490 hp	S	(Italy) Maranello, Emilia-Romagna	Yes
F430 Scuderia	Coupe	2005	2009	V8 4.3i 508 hp	S	(Italy) Maranello, Emilia-Romagna	No
F430 Scuderia 16M	Spider	2008	2009	V8 4.3i 503 hp	S	(Italy) Maranello, Emilia-Romagna	No
458 Italia	Coupe	2010		V8 4.5i 560 hp	S	(Italy) Maranello, Emilia-Romagna	Yes
550 Maranello	Coupe	1999	2002	V12 5.5i 485 hp	S	(Italy) Maranello, Emilia-Romagna	No
550 Barchetta	Coupe	1999	2002	V12 5.5i 485 hp	S	(Italy) Maranello, Emilia-Romagna	No
575M Maranello	Coupe	2003	2006	V12 5.7i 508 hp	S	(Italy) Maranello, Emilia-Romagna	No
575M Superamerica	Coupe	2007	2007	V12 5.7i 530 hp	S	(Italy) Maranello, Emilia-Romagna	No
599 GTB Fiorano	Coupe	2008		V12 6.0i 620 hp	S	(Italy) Maranello, Emilia-Romagna	Yes
456M	Coupe	1999	2004	V12 5.5i 442 hp	S	(Italy) Maranello, Emilia-Romagna	No
612 Scaglietti	Coupe	2005		V12 5.7i 540 hp	S	(Italy) Maranello, Emilia-Romagna	Yes
Enzo	Coupe	2003	2004	V12 6.0i 660 hp	S	(Italy) Maranello, Emilia-Romagna	No

=== (Italy) Fiat (2005–present) ===
- Panda (2008–present)
- 500 (2009–present)
- Idea; Adventure
- Palio; HB, Adventure
- Albea (2008–present)
- Grande Punto III (2007–present)
- Strada
- Ducato
- Stilo (2007); Schumacher (++)

=== (United States) Ford (1925–present) ===
Name	Body	Introduced	Retired	Engine	Transmission options	Origin	Available?	
Ka	Hatchback	2001	2008	I4 1.6i 94 hp	S	(Brazil) São Bernardo do Campo, São Paulo	No	
Fiesta IV	Hatchback	1998	2002		S	(Brazil) São Bernardo do Campo, São Paulo	No	
Fiesta IV Ikon	Notchback	2001	2007		S	Cuautitlán, State of Mexico	No	
Fiesta V	Hatchback	2002	2007		S	(Brazil) Camaçari, Bahia	No	
Fiesta V Ikon	Notchback	2005			S	(Brazil) Camaçari, Bahia	Yes	
Fiesta VI	Hatchback	2010			S/A	Cuautitlán, State of Mexico	Yes	
Fiesta VI Sedan	Notchback	2010	2012		S/A	Cuautitlán, State of Mexico	No	
Focus	Hatchback	2000	2004		S/A	(Mexico) Hermosillo, Sonora	No	
Focus	Notchback	2000	2007		S/A	(Mexico) Hermosillo, Sonora	No	
Focus	Station Wagon	2000	2004		S/A	(Mexico) Hermosillo, Sonora	No	
Focus II	Hatchback	2009	2011		S/A	General Pacheco, Argentina	Yes	
Focus II	Hatchback	2007	2011		S/A	General Pacheco, Argentina	Yes	
Mondeo III	Notchback	2002	2006		S/A	(Belgium) Genk, Limburg	No	No

- Fusion
- Econoline
- Ecosport
- Escape II
- Edge
- Explorer
- Excursion (2000–2005)
- Expedition
- Courier
- Ranger (Argentina) General Pacheco, Buenos Aires
- F-Series; F-150, F-250 (Both models are F-150 Mod 1997–2002) Just Single cab, F-150 4X2 V6 PETROL AND F-250 V8 PETROL 4X2 OR 4X4
- Explorer Sport Trac
- Lobo
- Transit
- Fiesta III ST
- Focus II ST
- Mustang VI; V6, GT, Shelby GT500
- Figo

=== (United States) GMC ===
- Canyon
- Yukon
- Yukon Denali
- Sierra
- Acadia

=== (Japan) Hino ===
- 500
- Profia
- S'elega

=== (Japan) Honda (1995–present) ===
Name	Body	Introduced	Retired	Engine	Transmission options	Origin	Available?
Fit I	Hatchback	2005	2008				No
Fit II	Hatchback	2009					Yes
City V	Notchback	2009					Yes
Civic VI	Notchback	1997	1999				No
Civic VII	Notchback	2000	2005				No
Civic VIII	Notchback	2006	2011				No
Civic IX	Notchback	2012	2017				No
Civic X	Notchback	2017					Yes
Accord V	Notchback						No
Accord VI	Notchback						No
Accord VII	Notchback						No
Accord VIII	Notchback						Yes
CR-V II	SUV						No
CR-V III	SUV	2007					Yes
Pilot I	SUV	2004	2008				No
Pilot II	SUV	2008					Yes
Odyssey II	SUV	2000	2004			(United States) Lincoln, Alabama	No
Odyssey III	MPV	2004				(United States) Lincoln, Alabama	Yes

- Ridgeline

=== (United States) Hummer (2006–2010) ===
- H2; SUV, SUT
- H3

=== (South Korea) Hyundai (2014–present) ===
- Grand i10
- Grand Starex
- Elantra
- Ioniq
- Sonata
- Santa Fe
- Palisade
- Tucson
- Accent
- Creta

=== (Japan) Isuzu ===
- Cubic
- D-Max
- Elf
- Forward
- Giga
- Trooper
- Turquoise

=== (United Kingdom) Jaguar ===
- X-Type
- XF
- XJ
- XK

=== (United States) Jeep (1994–present) ===
==== Current ====
- Patriot
- Compass
- Renegade
- Wrangler
- Grand Cherokee
- Gladiator

==== Discontinued ====
- Liberty
- Commander

=== (South Korea) Kia (2015–present) ===
- Besta
- Forte
- Optima
- Rio
- Sorento
- Soul
- Sportage
- Stinger GT
- Sedona
- Telluride

=== (Italy) Lamborghini (2010–present) ===
Name	Body	Introduced	Retired	Engine	Transmission options	Origin	Available?
Gallardo LP 560-4	Coupe	2010		V10 5.2i 552 hp		(Italy) Sant'Agata Bolognese, Emilia-Romagna	Yes
Gallardo LP 560-4 Spyder	Cabrio	2010		V10 5.2i 552 hp		(Italy) Sant'Agata Bolognese, Emilia-Romagna	Yes
Gallardo LP 570-4 Superleggera	Coupe	2010		V10 5.2i 562 hp		(Italy) Sant'Agata Bolognese, Emilia-Romagna	Yes
Murciélago LP 640	Coupe	2010	2011	V12 6.5i 631 hp		(Italy) Sant'Agata Bolognese, Emilia-Romagna	No
Murciélago LP 640 Roadster	Cabrio	2010	2011	V12 6.5i 631 hp		(Italy) Sant'Agata Bolognese, Emilia-Romagna	No
Murciélago LP 670-4 SuperVeloce	Coupe	2010	2011	V12 6.5i 661 hp		(Italy) Sant'Agata Bolognese, Emilia-Romagna	No

=== (United Kingdom) Land Rover ===
- LR3
- LR2
- Range Rover
- Range Rover Sport

=== (United States) Lincoln (1991–present) ===
The Navigator is Lincoln's most popular and successful car in Mexico.

- MKZ
- MKX
- MKS
- Navigator
- Mark LT

=== (Italy) Maserati (1998–present) ===
- Quattroporte
- GranTurismo

=== (Mexico) Mastretta (1989–present) ===
Name	Body	Introduced	Retired	Engine	Transmission options	Origin	Available?
MXA	Coupe	1998	1998	B4 1.6i 44 hp	S	Mexico City	No
MXB	Coupe	1998	1998	B4 1.6i 44 hp	S	Mexico City	No
MXT	Coupe	2011		L4 2.0ti 250 hp	S	Ocoyoacac, State of Mexico	Yes

=== (Japan) Mazda (2005–present) ===
Name	Body	Introduced	Retired	Engine	Transmission	Origin	Available?
2 DE	Hatchback	2011					No
3	Hatchback	2006	2008	L4 2.0i 148 hp	S		No
3	Notchback	2006	2008	L4 2.0i 148 hp	S		No
3 II	Hatchback	2009		L4 2.0i 148 hp	S		Yes
3	Notchback	2009		L4 2.0i 148 hp	S		Yes
5 II	MPV						No
5 III	MPV	2011					Yes
6	Saloon						No
6	Saloon						Yes
CX-7	SUV						Yes
CX-9	SUV						Yes
MX-5	Roadster						Yes
Mazdaspeed3	Hot hatch						Yes

=== (Germany) Mercedes-Benz (1984–present) ===
- A-Class Hatchback - Juiz de Fora, Brazil
- B-Class Sports Tourer/Hatchback - Juiz de Fora, Brazil
- C-Class Sedan, Sports Coupe & Wagon - Santiago Tianguistenco, State of Mexico
- CL-Class Coupe - Santiago Tianguistenco, State of Mexico
- CLK-Class Coupe & Cabriolet - Monterrey, Nuevo León (Mexico)
- CLS-Class "4 Door Coupe" - Santiago Tianguistenco, State of Mexico
- CLC-Class luxury compact car - Juiz de Fora, Brazil
- E-Class Sedan & Wagon - Santiago Tianguistenco, State of Mexico
- G-Class Cross-country vehicle - Santiago Tianguistenco, State of Mexico
- GL-Class SUV - Santiago Tianguistenco, Mexico
- M-Class SUV - Tuscaloosa, Alabama, United States
- R-Class Sports Tourer - Mexico City
- S-Class luxury sedan - Santiago Tianguistenco, State of Mexico
- SL-Class Roadster - Santiago Tianguistenco, State of Mexico
- SLK-Class Roadster - Mexico City, Mexico
- Sprinter Van Mexico City, Santiago Tianguistenco, State of Mexico, and Monterrey, Mexico

=== (United States) Mercury (1994–2011) ===
Name	Body	Introduced	Retired	Engine	Transmission options	Origin	Available?
Mariner II 4X2	SUV	2007	2011	V6 3.0i 240 hp	M	(United States) Claycomo, Missouri	No
Mariner II 4WD	SUV	2007	2011	V6 3.0i 240 hp	M	(United States) Claycomo, Missouri	No

=== (United Kingdom) - (China) MG (2020–present) ===
- 5
- ZS
- HS

=== (United Kingdom) MINI (2002–present) ===
Name	Body	Introduced	Retired	Engine	Transmission options	Origin	Available?
Cooper II	Coupe	2008		L4 1.6i 118 hp	S/M	(England) Oxford, Oxfordshire	Yes
Cabrio II	Coupe	2008		L4 1.6i 118 hp	S/M	(England) Oxford, Oxfordshire	Yes
Cooper II S	Coupe	2008		L4 1.6i 172 hp	S/M	(England) Oxford, Oxfordshire	Yes
Clubman II S	Station Wagon	2008		L4 1.6i 172 hp	S/M	(England) Oxford, Oxfordshire	Yes
Cabrio II S	Coupe	2008		L4 1.6i 118 hp	S/M	(England) Oxford, Oxfordshire	Yes
John Cooper Works	Coupe	2008		L4 1.6i 208 hp	S	(England) Oxford, Oxfordshire	Yes
John Cooper Works	Cabrio	2008		L4 1.6i 208 hp	S	(England) Oxford, Oxfordshire	Yes

=== (Japan) Mitsubishi (2003–present) ===
- Lancer X Just Petrol, 5-speed Manual or CVT, 3 trim levels: DE, ES, GTS.

GTS is only offered with CVT transmission, unlike US versions. Similar to European version

- Galant IX
- Grandis Just Petrol, 4-speed Automatic
- Montero Just Petrol, Automatic, 4wd, Limited Level. (5 doors) Imported from Japan
- Montero Sport Just Petrol, Automatic, 4wd. (5 doors) Imported from Thailand
- Endeavor
- Outlander II
- L200 L200 Petrol or Diesel, Just Crew Cab, 4x2 or 4x4
- Lancer Evolution IX (++)
- Eclipse IV; Coupé, Cabrio, 3.8L V6 only, Automatic only.
- L300; Coachvan Only
  - Mitsubishi Fuso
- Aero Bus
- Canter
- Fighter
- Super Great

=== (Japan) Nissan (1984–present) ===
Name	Body	Introduced	Retired	Engine options	Transmission options	Origin	Available?
Micra K12	Hatchback			I4 1.4i 88 hp	S		No
Aprio	Notchback	2008		I4 1.6i 101 hp	S/A	(Brazil) São José dos Pinhais, Paraná	Yes
Platina	Notchback	2002	2010	I4 1.6i 110 hp	S/A	(Mexico) Aguascalientes, Aguascalientes	No
Tsuru B11	Notchback	1984	1986		S	(Mexico) Cuernavaca, Morelos	No
Tsuru B11	Coupe	1984	1986		S	(Mexico) Cuernavaca, Morelos	No
Tsuru B12	Notchback	1986	1990		S	(Mexico) Cuernavaca, Morelos	No
Tsuru B12	Station Wagon	1986	1990		S	(Mexico) Cuernavaca, Morelos	No
Tsuru B13	Notchback	1993		I4 1.6i 105 hp	S	(Mexico) Cuernavaca, Morelos	Yes
Tsubame B13	Station Wagon	1993	2004	I4 1.6i 105 hp	S	(Mexico) Cuernavaca, Morelos	Yes
Sentra B14	Notchback	1995	1999		S	(Mexico) Aguascalientes, Aguascalientes	No
Sentra B15	Notchback	2000	2006		S	(Mexico) Aguascalientes, Aguascalientes	No
Sentra B16	Notchback	2007			S/CVT	(Mexico) Aguascalientes, Aguascalientes	Yes
Almera N16	Hatchback	2001	2006		S	(England) Sunderland, Tyne and Wear	No
Tiida	Hatchback	2006		I4 1.8i 125 hp	S/A	(Mexico) Aguascalientes, Aguascalientes (Mexico) Cuernavaca, Morelos	Yes
Tiida	Notchback	2006		I4 1.8i 125 hp	S/A	(Mexico) Aguascalientes, Aguascalientes (Mexico) Cuernavaca, Morelos	Yes
Rogue	SUV	2006		I4 2.5i 160 hp	S/A	(Japan)	Yes

- Altima IV CVT only, no Manual offered.
- Maxima VII
- Quest III
- Rogue
- X-Trail II CVT only, Petrol Only.
- Murano II
- Pathfinder III
- Titan
- Urvan
- 370Z Manual or Auto, Rear fog light unlike US versions.
- GT-R R35

=== (France) Peugeot (1958–1962; 1997–present) ===
- Partner; Grand Raid
- Expert; Tepee
- Manager

Name	Body	Introduced	Retired	Engine options	Transmission options	Origin	Available?
206	Hatchback	2002	2009	I4 1.4i 75 hp	S/A		No
206	Hatchback	2002	2009	I4 1.6i 110 hp	S/A		No
206 CC	Coupe-cabrio	2002	2006	I4 1.6i 110 hp	S/A		No
207 Compact	Hatchback	2009		I4 1.6i 110 hp	S/A		Yes
207 Compact	Notchback	2009		I4 1.6i 110 hp	S/A		Yes
207	Hatchback	2009	2009		S/A		No
207 CC	Hatchback	2009	2009		S/A		No
306	Notchback	1997	2002		S/A		No
307	Hatchback	2002	2009		S/A		No
307	Notchback	2005	2010		S/A		No
307 SW	Station Wagon	2002	2005		S/A		No
307 CC	Coupe-cabrio	2003	2009		S/A		No
308	Hatchback	2009			S/A		Yes
308 CC	Coupe-cabrio	2010					Yes
405	Saloon	1997	1998		S/A		No
406	Saloon	1998	2004		S/A		No
406 Coupe	Coupe	1999	2005		S/A		No
407	Saloon	2005	2012		S/A		No
508	Saloon	2012			S/A		Yes
607	Saloon	2003	2008		S/A	Sochaux, France	No
3008	MPV	2010			S/A		Yes
207 RC	Hot hatch	2009	2009		S		No
RCZ	Coupe	2010		I4 1.6ti 197 hp	S	Graz, Austria (Magna Steyr)	Yes

=== (United States) Pontiac (1994–2010) ===
- Matiz G2 (++)
- G3
- G5
- G6
- Torrent
- G6; GXP (++)
- Solstice; Roadster, GXP
- Aztek
- GTO
- Grand Prix
- Firebird

=== (Germany) Porsche (1995–present) ===
Name	Body	Introduced	Retired	Engine options	Transmission options	Country of origin	Available?
986 Boxster	Roadster	1997	2004		S	(Germany) Stuttgart, Baden-Württemberg	No
986 Boxster S	Roadster	1997	2004		S	(Germany) Stuttgart, Baden-Württemberg	No
987 Boxster	Roadster	2005			S/A/PDK	(Germany) Stuttgart, Baden-Württemberg	Yes
987 Boxster S	Roadster	2005			S	(Germany) Stuttgart, Baden-Württemberg	Yes
987 Cayman	Coupe	2005			S	(Germany) Stuttgart, Baden-Württemberg	Yes
987 Cayman S	Coupe	2005			S	(Germany) Stuttgart, Baden-Württemberg	Yes
987 Cayman S	Coupe	2005			S	(Germany) Stuttgart, Baden-Württemberg	Yes
993 Carrera	Coupe	1997	1998		S	(Germany) Stuttgart, Baden-Württemberg	No
993 Turbo	Coupe	1997	1998		S	(Germany) Stuttgart, Baden-Württemberg	No
996 Carrera	Coupe	1998	2004		S	(Germany) Stuttgart, Baden-Württemberg	No
996 Carrera S	Coupe	1998	2004		S	(Germany) Stuttgart, Baden-Württemberg	No
996 Carrera 4S	Coupe	1998	2004		S	(Germany) Stuttgart, Baden-Württemberg	No
996 Cabrio	Cabrio	1998	2004		S	(Germany) Stuttgart, Baden-Württemberg	No
996 Turbo	Coupe	1998	2004		S	(Germany) Stuttgart, Baden-Württemberg	No
996 GT3	Coupe	2000	2004		S	(Germany) Stuttgart, Baden-Württemberg	No
996 GT2	Coupe	2000	2004		S	(Germany) Stuttgart, Baden-Württemberg	No
997 Carrera	Coupe	2005			S	(Germany) Stuttgart, Baden-Württemberg	Yes
997 Turbo	Coupe	2005			S	(Germany) Stuttgart, Baden-Württemberg	Yes
997 GT3	Coupe	2005			S	(Germany) Stuttgart, Baden-Württemberg	Yes
997 GT2	Coupe	2005			S	(Germany) Stuttgart, Baden-Württemberg	Yes

- Cayenne Tiptronic Only, Petrol only.
- Cayenne GTS Tiptronic Only.

=== (United Kingdom) Radical ===
Name	Body	Introduced	Retired	Engine options	Transmission options	Origin	Available?
SR3 RS	Racecar	2009		L4 1.5i 265 hp	S	(England) Westwood, Cambridgeshire	Yes

=== (France) Renault (1963–1986; 2000–present) ===
Name	Body	Introduced	Retired	Engine options	Transmission options	Origin	Available?
R4	Hatchback	1961	1970		S	(Mexico) Ciudad Sahagún, Hidalgo	No
R5	Hatchback	1972	1984	I4 1.3i 59 hp	S	(Mexico) Ciudad Sahagún, Hidalgo	No
Sandero	Hatchback	2010		I4 1.6i 101 hp	S/A	(Brazil) São José dos Pinhais, Paraná	Yes
Clio II	Hatchback	2002	2010	I4 1.6i 110 hp	S/A	(Mexico) Aguascalientes, Aguascalientes	No
Clio III	Hatchback	2006	2008	I4 1.6i 110 hp	S/A	(France) Strasbourg, Alsace	No
Encore	Hatchback	1984	1986	I4 1.7i 89 hp	S	Mexico City	No
Alliance	Notchback	1984	1986	I4 1.4i 59 hp	S	Mexico City	No
Scala	Notchback	2010		I4 1.6i 101 hp	S/A	(South Korea) Busan, Yeongnam	Yes
Mégane	Notchback	2000	2004	I4 2.0i 140 hp	S/A	(Turkey) Bursa, Bursa	No
Mégane II	Hatchback	2003	2009	I4 2.0i 140 hp	S/A	(Spain) Palencia, Castile and León	No
Mégane II	Notchback	2007	2010	I4 1.6i 110 hp I4 2.0i 138 hp	S S/A	(Turkey) Bursa, Bursa	No
Mégane II CC	Coupe-cabrio	2004	2009	I4 2.0i 138 hp I4 2.0t 162 hp	M		No
Fluence	Notchback	2010	2017	I4 2.0i 138 hp	S/A	(Turkey) Bursa, Bursa	No
R12	Notchback	1972	1978		S		No
R18	Notchback	1978	1984	I4 2.0i	S		No
Laguna II	Hatchback	2002	2008	V6 3.0i	M	France	No
Laguna II Grand Tour	Station Wagon	2002	2007	V6 3.0i	M	France	No
Safrane II	Sedan	2009	2016	V6 2.3i 168 hp	M	(South Korea) Busan, Yeongnam	No
Safrane III	Sedan	2011	2016	V6 3.5i 240 hp	M	(South Korea) Busan, Yeongnam	No
Scénic I	MPV	2000	2005	I4 2.0i 138 hp	S/A	(Mexico) Aguascalientes, Aguascalientes	No
Scénic II	MPV	2005	2009	I4 2.0i 138 hp	S/A		No
Koleos	SUV	2008		I4 2.5i 170 hp	A	(South Korea) Busan, Yeongnam	Yes
Kangoo I	LAV	2004	2019	I4 1.6i 110 hp	S	(Argentina) Santa Isabel, Córdoba	No
Nueva Kangoo	LAV	2019		N/A	N/A	Córdoba, Argentina	Yes
Trafic	Panel	2007	2009	I4 1.9d 99 hp	S		No
Trafic	Van	2007	2009	I4 1.9d 99 hp	S		No
Clio II RS	Hatchback	2001	2004	I4 2.0i 176 hp	S	(France) Dieppe, Seine-Maritime	No
Clio II RS Team	Hatchback	2005	2007	I4 2.0i 188 hp	S	(France) Dieppe, Seine-Maritime	No
Mégane II GT	Hatchback	2008	2009	I4 2.0ti 165 hp	S	(Spain) Palencia, Castile and León	No
Mégane II GT	Coupe	2008	2009	I4 2.0ti 165 hp	S	(Spain) Palencia, Castile and León	No
Mégane II RS	Coupe	2004	2009	I4 2.0ti 247 hp	S	(France) Dieppe, Seine-Maritime	No
Clio RS 200	Hatchback	2014					Yes
Twizy	Supermini	2017					Yes
Logan	Sedan	2014					Yes

=== (Sweden) Saab ===
- 9-3
- 9-5

=== (Spain) SEAT (2001–present) ===
Name	Body	Introduced	Retired	Engine options	Transmission options	Country of origin	Available?
Exeo	Sedan	2011	2011	I4 2.0i 200 hp	S/A	Spain	No
Ibiza II	Hatchback	2001	2003	I4 1.6i 103 hp	S		No
Ibiza III	Hatchback	2003	2009	I4 1.6i 103 hp	S		No
Ibiza IV	Hatchback	2009		I4 2.0i 115 hp	S/DSG		Yes
León	Hatchback	2001	2005		S/A		No
León II	Hatchback	2005			S/DSG		Yes
Toledo II	Notchback	2001	2005		S/A		No
Toledo III	LMPV	2005	2007		S/A		No
Altea	SMPV	2005			S/A		No
León Cupra R	Hot hatch	2003	2005	I4 1.8t 221 hp	S/A		No
León II Cupra R	Hot hatch	2003	2005	I4 2.0t 261 hp	S/A		No

- Altea XL
- Freetrack
- León Cupra R
- Alhambra

=== (Germany) Smart (2001–present) ===
Name	Body	Introduced	Retired	Engine options	Transmission options	Country of origin	Available?
Fortwo I	Coupe	2001	2007	I3 1.0i 70 hp	S	(France) Hambach	No
Fortwo I	Cabrio	2001	2007	I3 1.0i 70 hp	S	(France) Hambach	No
Fortwo II	Coupe	2007		I3 1.0i 70 hp	S	(France) Hambach	Yes
Fortwo II	Cabrio	2007		I3 1.0i 70 hp	S	(France) Hambach	Yes
Fortwo II Passion	Coupe	2007		I3 1.0i 84 hp	S	(France) Hambach	Yes
Fortwo II Passion	Cabrio	2007		I3 1.0i 84 hp	S	(France) Hambach	Yes
Roadster	Cabrio	2003	2005		S	(France) Hambach	No
Roadster Coupe	Coupe	2003	2005	I3 1.0i 81 hp	S	(France) Hambach	No

=== (Japan) Subaru (2017–present) ===
- Crosstrek Presented as XV
- Forester
- BRZ
- WRX_STI

=== (Japan) Suzuki (2005–present) ===
Name	Body	Introduced	Retired	Engine(s)	Transmission(s)	Origin	Available?
Swift V	Hatchback	2006			S		Yes
Aerio	Hatchback	2005	2006	I4 2.3i 155 hp	S	(Japan) Kosai, Shizuoka	No
SX4	Hatchback	2007			S		Yes
SX4	Notchback	2007			S		Yes
Kizashi	Saloon	2010		I4 2.4i 185 hp		(Japan) Sagara, Shizuoka	Yes
Grand Vitara II	SUV	2005					Yes
XL7 II	SUV	2008	2009			(Japan) Hamamatsu, Shizuoka	No

=== (Japan) Toyota (2002–present) ===
- Yaris
- Yaris Sedan
- Yaris R
- Corolla (Available as a 4-door sedan only. The basic Base model, upmarket LE and SE trims come from Mississippi, U.S.A.)
- Matrix
- Camry Automatic Only.
- Highlander
- Sequoia
- Avanza
- Hiace Just Petrol
- Hilux Just Single Cab and Double Cab, 2.7 cc Petrol, 5-speed manual, 4x2 only Imported from Thailand.
- Tacoma Just Crew Cab, 4.0 cc Petrol, 5-speed automatic, 4x2 only Made in Mexico.
- Tundra
- RAV4 Petrol Only, Automatic Only.
- Sienna
- Land Cruiser
- Supra

=== (Germany) Volkswagen (1954–present) ===
Name	Body	Introduced	Retired	Engine	Transmission options	Origin	Available?
Sedan	Coupe	1954	2003	B4 1.6i 44 hp	S	(Mexico) Puebla, Puebla	No
Pointer II	Hatchback	1998	2008	I4 1.8i 98 hp	S	(Brazil) São Bernardo do Campo, São Paulo	No
Gol V	Hatchback	2008		I4 1.8i 98 hp	S	(Brazil) São Bernardo do Campo, São Paulo	Yes
Gol V	Notchback	2008		I4 1.8i 98 hp	S	(Brazil) São Bernardo do Campo, São Paulo	Yes
Lupo II	Hatchback	2004	2009	I4 1.6i 100 hp	S	(Brazil) São Bernardo do Campo, São Paulo	No
SportVan	Hatchback	2004		I4 1.6i 100 hp	S	(Argentina) General Pacheco, Buenos Aires	Yes
CrossFox	Hatchback	2005		I4 1.6i 100 hp	S	(Brazil) São Bernardo do Campo, São Paulo	Yes
Caribe I	Hatchback	1977	1987	I4 1.6i 66 hp	S	(Mexico) Puebla, Puebla	No
Atlantic I	Notchback	1981	1985	I4 1.6i 66 hp	S		No
Caribe I GT	Hatchback	1984	1987	I4 1.8i 85 hp	S	(Mexico) Puebla, Puebla	No
Golf II	Hatchback	1987	1992	I4 1.8i 72 hp	S	(Mexico) Puebla, Puebla	No
Golf II	Hatchback	1987	1992	I4 1.8i 85 hp	S/A	(Mexico) Puebla, Puebla	No
Jetta II	Notchback	1985	1992	I4 1.8i 85 hp	S/A	(Mexico) Puebla, Puebla	No
Golf II GTI	Hatchback	1989	1992	I4 1.8i 105 hp	S	(Mexico) Puebla, Puebla	No
Golf III	Hatchback	1993	1999		S	(Mexico) Puebla, Puebla	No
Golf III	Cabrio	1993	1999		S	(Mexico) Puebla, Puebla	No
Jetta III	Notchback	1993	1999		S	(Mexico) Puebla, Puebla	No
Golf III GTI	Hatchback			VR6 2.8i 172 hp	S	(Mexico) Puebla, Puebla	No
Golf IV	Hatchback	1999	2007	I4 2.0 115 hp	S/A	(Germany) Wolfsburg, Lower Saxony	No
Jetta IV	Notchback	1999		I4 2.0 115 hp	S/A	(Mexico) Puebla, Puebla	Yes
Golf IV	Cabrio	1999	2004	I4 2.0 115 hp	S/A	(Germany) Wolfsburg, Lower Saxony	No
Golf IV GTI	Hatchback	1999	2004	I4 1.8ti 180 hp	S	(Germany) Wolfsburg, Lower Saxony	No
Golf IV R32	Hatchback	2003	2004	VR6 3.2i 237 hp	S/A	(Germany) Wolfsburg, Lower Saxony	No
Golf IV R32	Hatchback	2003	2004	VR6 3.2i 237 hp	S/A	(Germany) Wolfsburg, Lower Saxony	No
Golf V GTI	Hatchback	2006	2010	I4 2.0ti 197 hp	S/DSG	(Germany) Wolfsburg, Lower Saxony	Yes
Bora II	Notchback	2005		I5 2.5i 172 hp	S/M	(Mexico) Puebla, Puebla	Yes
Bora II	Notchback	2007		I4 1.9td 103 hp	S/DSG	(Mexico) Puebla, Puebla	Yes
Bora II GLI	Notchback	2005		I4 2.0ti 197 hp	S/DSG	(Mexico) Puebla, Puebla	Yes
Jetta VI	Notchback	2010		I5 2.5i 172 hp	S/DSG	(Mexico) Puebla, Puebla	Yes
Jetta VI	Notchback	2010		I4 1.9td 103 hp	DSG	(Mexico) Puebla, Puebla	No
Golf V GTI Pirelli	Hatchback	2006	2010	I4 2.0ti 227 hp	DSG	(Germany) Wolfsburg, Lower Saxony	Yes
Golf VI Sportwagen	Station Wagon	2009		I5 2.5i 170 hp	S/M	(Mexico) Puebla, Puebla	Yes
Passat VI CC	Coupe	2008		I4 2.0ti 197 hp	DSG	(Germany) Emden, East Frisia	Yes
Passat VI CC	Coupe	2008		V6 3.6i 276 hp	M	(Germany) Emden, East Frisia	Yes
Volkswagen Vento	Notchback	2015		I4 1.6lMPI/ 1.5TDI 103 hp	M/DSG	(India) Pune, Maharashtra	Yes

- Amarok (Imported from Argentina).
- Eurovan (T5 Transporter cargo and passenger van w/long wheelbase. Only sold with the 1.9TDi/105 hp engine)
- (Mexico) Jetta IV; 2.0i, 1.9TDi
- (Mexico) Beetle (Sold as GLS with 2.0 115 hp engine, Sport, Cabriolet and Sport GLX trims with 5 cil. 2.5 lt 170 hp engine. All variants with 5-speed manual and 6-speed tiptronic gearboxes)
- Routan
- Passat (It is sold with 2.0 TFSi 200 hp, and V6 3.6 280 hp engines with 6-speed Tiptronic gearbox, the latter one is available also as a 4Motion model. Imported from Germany)
- Tiguan
- (Slovakia) Touareg; V6, V8 Petrol, V6 TDI.
- Crafter
- (Mexico) Jetta GLI; 1.8T
- GLI; 2.0 TFSi/DSG

=== (Sweden) Volvo ===
==== Current ====
- XC40
- XC60
- XC90
- S60
- S40

==== Discontinued ====
- C30
- S40 AWD 2,5T Only with Automatic Transmission,2,4L FWD Manual.
- S80
- V50
- C70

=== (Mexico) Vuhl ===
- VUHL 05

== Missing makers ==
Few are the mainstream makers that have not official representation in Mexico but all of their models can be imported through exotic car dealers located mostly in Mexico City, the city of Puebla, the city of Veracruz, Mérida, Yucatán, Monterrey, Nuevo León and Guadalajara, Jalisco.

=== Citroën ===
Some people have begun to import some C4 models to Mexican streets. There is a small unofficial importer in the Interlomas section in the State of Mexico, just bordering Mexico City. So far, the French maker has not made an official announcement or pointed out plans for entering the Mexican market in the near future, and remains one of the few countries in the world (along with the United States and Canada) where Citroën cars are not currently available.

=== Lancia ===
Some Lancia models were imported to Mexico in the early 2000s and presented at the 2003 Mexican Autoshow, though dealerships have not yet opened in the country. The next generation Delta, however, and Lancia's opening for new Latin American markets has given a wide possibility the maker would be selling starting in 2009.

=== Lexus (no longer missing) ===
After many false rumors on entering the Mexican market for more than one decade, an official entry was finally programmed for the final quarter of 2021, in September 2021, with vehicles of the 2022 model year. The reason for this was to allow Lexus apply a marketing strategy and have time to make necessary adjustments to suspension and motor to all of its vehicles, to offer characteristic comfort of the brand in Mexico. The models that are currently sold in Mexico are the Lexus LS500h (hybrid), along with the ES, RX, LX, and UX, all of these models are additionally offered in hybrid versions, as Lexus has found the most "green" lineup in the luxury segment in Mexico to offer all of its models with a hybrid variant. Once the brand arrived to Mexico, five agencies in Mexico City, Guadalajara, Jalisco, and Monterrey, Nuevo León have opened their doors, and the agencies are currently focusing on creating a purchase experience to all of their clients. However, the sport F range of cars is not yet confirmed, neither are there currently plans to launch it. Finally, as of late 2021, a new factory has begun operations in the city of Guanajuato, where the Toyota Tacoma is built. In addition, the Lexus brand is an independent division which gets help from Toyota de México, and additional help from TMNA and Lexus USA (its home market).

=== Maybach ===
- 57
- 62

=== Rolls-Royce ===
The Phantom is currently the only model available in Mexico at the moment, it has a cost of $415,000 US dollars. However, it is known that several varieties of Rolls-Royces are owned throughout the country, these were individually imported.

- Phantom

=== Saleen ===
Saleen has no official subsidiary in Mexico, but they are imported through an official representative importer.

- S7

=== Scion ===
Toyota's youth line has not been introduced to the Mexican market, although it has tried to enter the market with no official date, as the brand was discontinued in 2016.

=== Škoda ===
Volkswagen and certain European car distributors import some Skodas to Mexico, but with the process, this economy line turns out to be much more expensive than other higher end cars, making its purchase quite unattractive for the Mexican market.

== See also ==
- Manufacturing in Mexico
- Latin American economy
