= Manufacturing in Mexico =

Manufacturing in Mexico grew rapidly in the late 1960s with the end of the US farm labor agreement known as the bracero program. This sent many unskilled farm laborers back into the Northern border region with no source of income. As a result, the US and Mexican governments agreed to The Border Industrialization Program, which permitted US companies to assemble product in Mexico using raw materials and components from the US with reduced duties. The Border Industrialization Program became known popularly as The Maquiladora Program or shortened to The Maquila Program.

Over the years, simple assembly operations in Mexico have evolved into complex manufacturing operations including televisions, automobiles, industrial and personal products. While inexpensive commodity manufacturing has flown to China, Mexico attracts U.S. manufacturers that need low-cost solutions near-by for higher value end products and just-in-time components.

Larger foreign firms with global experience can set up operations in Mexico readily. Smaller companies are usually advised to seek professional help from a qualified consulting firm or by working with a partner in Mexico.

== Disadvantages ==
- Corruption levels in some sectors of the government are sometimes higher than many low-cost European manufacturing centers, albeit in more recent times this has not been a significant issue; moreover, your intellectual property can be protected. Foreigners deal with this by securing good qualified advice from professionals.
- Mexico has employment laws that impose strong penalties on companies for laying off employees. Joint ventures, shelter companies and other co-arrangements minimize the risk here.

== Methods of operation ==
There are five common methods by which foreign companies setup manufacturing operations in Mexico.

- contract manufacturing / subcontracting
- joint venture
- wholly owned subsidiary
- shelter operation
- outsourced manufacturing

=== Contracting ===
Companies are well advised to consider the contract manufacturing or subcontract manufacture option when the work to be performed requires approximately 25 individuals or less, or is sporadic. Once this number is surpassed, other options would provide savings as a result of economies of scale derived from increased labor content.

Companies with high quality requirements must be certain to identify and work with firms capable of meeting and maintaining their exacting standards. If quality standards can be maintained, contract manufacturing / subcontract manufacturing can be the best option for firms seeking to manufacture product without making the large capital and organizational investment required on their own. Manufacturers with high intellectual property content must be assured that such property is protected.

While contract manufacturing or subcontracting has the potential to be an excellent situation for the foreign company due to the fact that the responsibility for production, quality, and delivery is held by the contract manufacturer or subcontractor, it is often very difficult to find a company in Mexico that has the ability to operate as a true contract manufacturer or subcontractor.

=== Joint venture ===
A second means by which manufacturers can set up operations in Mexico is through the establishment of a joint-venture agreement with an indigenous party. Joint venturing can be an effective means to achieving organizational goals given the local partner's detailed knowledge of the market and its prevailing conditions. Relationships with firms that have established distribution channels may be of particular value to parties seeking to supply product to domestic markets.

Establishing and maintaining a joint-venture relationship can be challenging in that both parties must share a compatibility of organizational culture, as well as pursue similar goals and objectives. Encountering a partner with sufficient similarity of process and purpose can often prove to be a significant challenge.

=== Wholly owned subsidiary ===
A firm can establish itself in Mexico through the formation of a wholly owned subsidiary. As is the case with initiating operations in any foreign environment, this can be the most complex, costly and risk-laden alternative. In addition to committing the organization to the investment of “bricks and mortar,” the manufacturer must take the time, make the effort and assume the cost of assembling the skill sets required to navigate new waters. Expertise must be sought, acquired and retained in such diverse areas as labor law, human resources, payroll and benefits administration, environmental law, customs law, logistics, import/export operations, accounting, taxation, real estate law, etc. Although there is much involved with the establishment of a wholly owned subsidiary, it does enable the organization to have 100% control over all of its activities.

=== Shelter Operation ===
A fourth option that allows firms to fully control their own production and quality, to benefit from the experience of an organization that knows the local market, and which eliminates the need to make sizeable investments in physical and human assets is the manufacturing Shelter. Established in 1966, Cal Pacifico S.A. de C.V. was the second company to operate under the then new Maquiladora Program in Mexico and pioneered the shelter service provider model, providing those services to clients in that same year. The model proved so successful that later Cal Pacifico brought to Mexico to manufacture under the shelter operation method a long list of multinational manufacturers such as Asahi Overseas Corp., Bayer Corp., Eli Lilly & Co., 2 divisions of Emerson Electric Co., Esselte Pendaflex Corp., 2 divisions of General Dynamics Corp., Haemonetics Corp., 2 divisions of Hughes Corp., ITT General Controls, Medtronic, Inc., Northrop Grumman Corp., Pall Corp., Polk Audio, Inc., Scott USA, Smith Goggle Co., Sony Corporation of America, 7 divisions of Teledyne, Inc., The Carlyle Group, and Tyco, Inc. among others. Working through a shelter service provider, foreign-based manufacturers are able to initiate operations quickly without actually establishing a legal presence in the country. They are in Mexico as a department or subsidiary of their chosen shelter service provider. In essence, firms opting to use this vehicle are “sheltered” from many of the risks and liabilities that normally affect firms that choose to incorporate directly. Under the typical shelter arrangement, manufacturers send machinery & equipment, raw materials and supervisory personnel to train and manage workers, while the shelter service provider performs the tasks and functions that are not “core” to the manufacturing process. The manufacturer controls those areas that affect profitability and sustained growth. Shelter service providers typically offer their clients services in some or all of the following areas: human resources, payroll and benefits administration, logistics, import/export operations, accounting, taxation, legal, risk management, plant and park management, procurement, environmental, customs compliance, and real estate leasing. Those shelter services provide for the perfect match of offshore operational knowledge and manufacturing expertise... the technical support capabilities of the shelter service provider and the product manufacturing talents of its client(s).

This is a value-added outsourcing arrangement in that it gives manufacturers a means by which to greater leverage core competencies and intellectual assets. An organization that does this becomes more nimble, and experiences faster and higher levels of innovation. Additionally this arrangement is attractive to firms seeking to pursue strategies of leveraged growth. As a manufacturer expands under a shelter arrangement, they absorb only a portion of the additional overhead that an expansion of activities requires.

=== Outsourcing ===
A quickly growing fifth option for foreign companies to set up manufacturing operations in Mexico is to "Outsource" their manufacturing operation to an independent Corporation "Maquiladora". The manufacturing outsource option is a hybrid of both the "shelter" system and traditional "contract manufacturing or subcontracting". The way that the manufacturing outsource option works is that a foreign company essentially hires the maquiladora to manufacture the foreign company's products for them in Mexico (much like in a "contract manufacturing / subcontract" situation) but with an inexpensive Mexican workforce that utilizes the equipment, tooling, and processes of the foreign company (much like in a "shelter" situation).

The key difference between a manufacturing outsource situation and a contract manufacturing / subcontracting situation, is that in a contract manufacturing / subcontracting situation the contract manufacturer / subcontractor already has the equipment, tooling, procedure, supply chain, and expertise in place and is currently manufacturing products that are very similar to the products that the foreign company needs. In contrast, a manufacturing outsource company utilizes the foreign company's equipment, tooling, supply chain, and procedure combined with in-house expertise to manufacture the foreign company's product in exactly the same way the foreign company makes it themselves.

The key difference between a manufacturing outsource situation and a "shelter" situation, is that in a shelter situation the foreign company must have a constant physical presence in Mexico to manage and oversee their operation, as the shelter provider bills the foreign company for the services provided (see “shelter” above) without taking responsibility for production, quality, and delivery of the product. In contrast, a manufacturing outsource company bills the foreign company on a “price per piece” basis which shifts the responsibility for production, quality, and delivery to the manufacturing outsource company; therefore allowing the foreign company to concentrate on their core competencies without having to manage a foreign manufacturing operation.

The manufacturing outsource option is rapidly becoming a reality for many foreign companies interested in utilizing Mexico’s cost-effective workforce, with clothing manufacturing leading the way. The fashion and apparel sector—due to its need for quick replenishment, flexible production, and standardizable product categories—is often the first to embrace new outsourcing formats, as it benefits greatly from reduced lead times and closer proximity to U.S. markets.

According to NearTrade’s 2025 sourcing data, shirts and tops account for 54.7% of all clothing‑related buyer inquiries for Mexican manufacturers, followed by pants and shorts (10.6%), jackets (6.8%), sportswear/activewear (6.8%), uniforms (5.6%), formalwear (5.6%), socks and underwear (4.4%), hats (3.7%), footwear (1.3%), and other accessories (0.6%). This shows that the clothing manufacturing market is still dominated by products that generally need the least amount of customization, signaling an early-stage outsourced clothing industry.

== See also ==
- Maquiladora
- Automotive industry in Mexico
