= Automóvil Panamericano =

- 2012 Lamborghini Aventador on Automóvil Panamericano's May 2011 issue cover (#196).
- Editor: Hernán Aceves Conde
- Categories: Automotive
- Frequency: Quarterly
- Total circulation: 125,000
- First issue: 1995
- Company: AMDM Media
- Country: Mexico
- Based in: Mexico City
- Language: Spanish

Automóvil Panamericano or simply Automóvil (Spanish for "Panamerican automobile") is a Mexican automotive enthusiast magazine first published in 1995. It ranked as the ninth most read magazine in Mexico, and the most read Spanish language automotive magazine in the world.

Critical testing, motor sports and buyers guidance have been a regular since its founding.

== History ==
Originally based on the Spanish magazine Automóvil Fórmula (issued since 1978), the first issue of Automóvil Panamericano was officially released on 15 January 1995, whereas a sample #0 issue had appeared months earlier in October 1994. The layout of this first issue's cover would retain a simple style that would abide until today, presenting Automovil's logo on the top header, the months' featured tested car centered, further tests on the bottom and various articles elsewhere.

The first renewal of the magazine was issued in February 2002 as editorial director Ricardo Chan Robles took charge. The magazine's frame changed to black and the logo was changed, now using a bolder typography.

== Sister projects ==
- Auto Plus (initially called "Guía Util del Automóvil") was Automóvil Panamericano's sister publication, targeted at young enthusiasts and focusing on practical issues within the automotive world, short tests and a price list. It was published monthly for eight years between 2002 and 2010.
- Automóvil TV was the television counterpart of the magazine. It featured from 2003 to 2008 on Televisa's Galavision (Channel 9).
- Automóvil W is a radio program first broadcast in March 2007 in W Radio (96.9 MHz FM, 900 MHz AM & Online) of Televisa Radio.

Automóvil Digital is a running online project appeared in July 2007 to distribute a digital version of the magazine to a VIP readers list.

MyAutomovil.com is the online counterpart appeared for the Latin market in North America in March 2008 (WWW.MYAUTOMOVIL.COM).

== Special issues ==
On May 15, 2003, was launched the magazine number 100th. The cover was coloured yellow and were added up to 50 pages.

The cover showed 20 exotic cars that were considered the best of the world, featuring the Pagani Zonda S, the Ferrari 550 Maranello and the Mini Cooper.

The ten-year anniversary commemorative was launched on February 15, 2005. The frame now changed to red and were added up to 30 pages. In the cover featured the Mercedes-Benz SLR McLaren. The cover had remained the same since then.

On February 15, 2010, was launched the magazine special edition the 15th anniversary.

== Car of the Year ==
Since its first issue, Automóvil Panamericano would raffle off a brand new automobile with the Juzge su coche y gane un coche contest (Judge your car and win a car). The readers would review several aspects of their current car (if they had any) and send the answer sheet via post mail to Automóvil's headquarters in Mexico City. After the deadline, a winner would be chosen and the results of the survey would be published in the following month's issue.

However, in 1999 the contest's rules underwent a major renewal, resulting in the Best Cars of the Year contest, in which the favourite automobile for each category would be picked by readers, no longer having to review their own car; the contestants would send their answers via post mail as before.

Since 2003, actual silver prizes would be awarded to the people-chosen winning cars; marques would send a representative to collect the small statue at a special ceremony. Additionally, a special golden award to the Best Car of the Year (overall) would be given.

=== Juzge su coche y gane un coche ===
- 1995 Prize: BMW 325i
- 1996 Mercury Sable - Prize: Land Rover Discovery
- 1997 Pontiac Grand Prix - Prize: Volkswagen New Beetle
- 1998 Audi A6 (Mediano) - Prize: Peugeot 306

=== Best Cars ===
- 1999 Prize: Audi A3
- 2000 Prize: Volkswagen Jetta
- 2001 Prize: Volkswagen New Beetle Turbo
- 2002 Prize: Mercedes C200K Estate

=== Best Cars and Car of the Year ===
- 2003 Renault Mégane (Prize: Audi A3)
- 2004 Porsche Cayenne (Car of the Year) - Prize: Chrysler Crossfire
- 2005 Volkswagen Jetta (Car of the Year) - Prize: SEAT Altea
- 2006 Volkswagen Bora (Car of the Year) - Prize: Suzuki Grand Vitara
- 2007 Volkswagen Golf GTI (Car of the Year) - Prize: Audi A3 TDI
- 2008 Prize: Mazda Miata
- 2009 Audi R8 (Car of the Year) - Prize: Fiat 500 Sport
- 2010 Prize: Suzuki Kizashi
- 2011 Prize: Audi A1
- 2012 Prize: Volvo S60
- 2013 Prize: Seat Toledo
- 2014 Prize: Porsche Macan

== Editorial direction ==
Issues	Editor
March 1995 - April 1999	Juan Hernández
May 1999 - March 2001	Juan Manuel García
April 2001 - March 2002	Ricardo Chan Robles
April 2002 - May 2002	José Carlos de Mier
June 2002 - August 2004	Fernando Miranda
September 2004 - May 2008	Javier Barranco
June 2008 - February 2010	Fernando Carrión
February 2010 - September 2014	Héctor Ocampo
September 2014 -	Hernán Aceves
