= Mercedes-Benz Mexico =

Mexico subsidiary of Mercedes-Benz Group

Mercedes-Benz Mexico S. de R.L. de C.V.
- Company type: Subsidiary
- Industry: Automotive
- Predecessor: Fábrica Automotriz Mexicana S.A.
- Founded: 1990; 35 years ago
- Headquarters: Mexico City, Mexico
- Area served: Mexico
- Key people: Lauren Brown (CEO)
- Products: Automobiles
- Parent: Mercedes-Benz Group
- Website: mercedes-benz.com.mx

Mercedes-Benz Mexico S. de R.L. de C.V. is a subsidiary of the Mercedes-Benz Group, headquartered in Mexico City.

== History ==
Mercedes-Benz Mexico started from the company FAMSA (Fábrica Automotriz Mexicana S.A.) in 1990 with the same people and facilities. Before that, FAMSA had a joint venture with the Mexican company Hermes-Group, where Mercedes-Benz AG had 20%. Bharat Benz's-Group have some other automotive parts manufacturing operations in Mexico.

FAMSA was assembling trucks with International engines and QSP American Cabins at that time. The Monterrey facilities were born from a CAIO Brazilian bus manufacturing company who were working with the Mexican crises in 1995. At that time Marcopolo, another bus body manufacturer entered a joint venture with Mercedes Benz, where the Viaggio and Paradiso bus models were assembled on a Mercedes-Benz chassis during the '90s.

Mercedes-Benz Mexico has four manufacturing facilities in:

- Santiago Tianguistenco (STMP) Produces Freightliner's Business Class M2 medium-duty truck models; Freightliner's heavy-duty models, including the FLD Series, Century Class, Columbia and Coronado. The plant has won numerous quality awards including the DTNA Top Quality Award in 2006, 2007, 2009 & 2010 and the TOS overall implementation award in 2008 & 2009.
- Monterrey (urban, intercity, touring buses & CKD kit assembly of high-performance vehicles) The Monterrey plant opened in 1994 for the manufacture of Mercedes-Benz buses which it continues to manufacture. The plant also manufactures the chassis and suspension for the Mercedes-Benz M & GL classes, which are then shipped to Tuscaloosa, Alabama. In 2009 the plant manufactured its 50,000th bus
- Toluca(Manufacture of engines, electronics & transmissions and SKD kit assembly of sedans) This plant is a joint venture with Detroit diesel and is responsible for assembly and re-manufacture of engines, electronics and transmissions for Mercedes vehicles.
- Saltillo (full manufacture of class 7 and 8 trucks). This plant is responsible for the manufacture of Mercedes-Benz heavy trucks. They are re-branded as Freightliner trucks in the United States.

== Future growth ==
In 2012, Mercedes-Benz CEO Dieter Zetsche stated that the company is planning to open a new factory in North America with many industry insiders suggesting the plant would be in Mexico. In 2012, Mercedes-Benz Mexico Co-President Bruno Cattori announced that the company was planning to build a new factory in Mexico. In 2012 Mercedes-Benz stated that they were planning with Nissan to build the new plant adjacent to Nissan's plant in Aguascalientes, Mexico with which it would also produce models for Nissans luxury brand, Infiniti. The new plant's goals are to satisfy the growing demand of Mexican and South American luxury car markets and to take advantage of Mexico's free trade agreements with the United States, Mercedes-Benz's second largest market. Mexico is Mercedes Benz's second fastest growing major market with a growth rate of 29.9%, behind only Japan at 38.5%.

On March 5, 2014, Zetsche confirmed that the expansion of a Nissan plant in Mexico for production of the next compact class family of Mercedes-Benz was under consideration. However, other options were also being considered, said Dieter Zetsche. Daimler has a joint venture with Renault-Nissan.

The Mexican Secretary of Defense (SEDENA) and Secretary of the Navy (SEMAR) also build several Mercedes-Benz models in Semi Knock Down kits (G-Class, Zetros, and Unimog) under license using Mexican and German sourced components.

== Other information ==
Mercedes-Benz Mexico is the sole representative, distributor and manufacturer of the Mercedes and Smart brands in Mexico and covers parts of the Central American and South American markets as well. Mexican built vehicles are manufactured primarily for the Mexican market which has seen growth in demand since the late 1990s but Mexican built Mercedes Benz vehicles are also sold in South and Central America. As of 2012, the only Mexican built Mercedes-Benz vehicles available in the United States are the international truck series, buses and commercial vehicles. As of 2009 Mercedes Benz Mexico / Daimler Vehiculos Mexico controlled 60% of Mexico's commercial vehicle market.
