= Suzuki Kizashi =

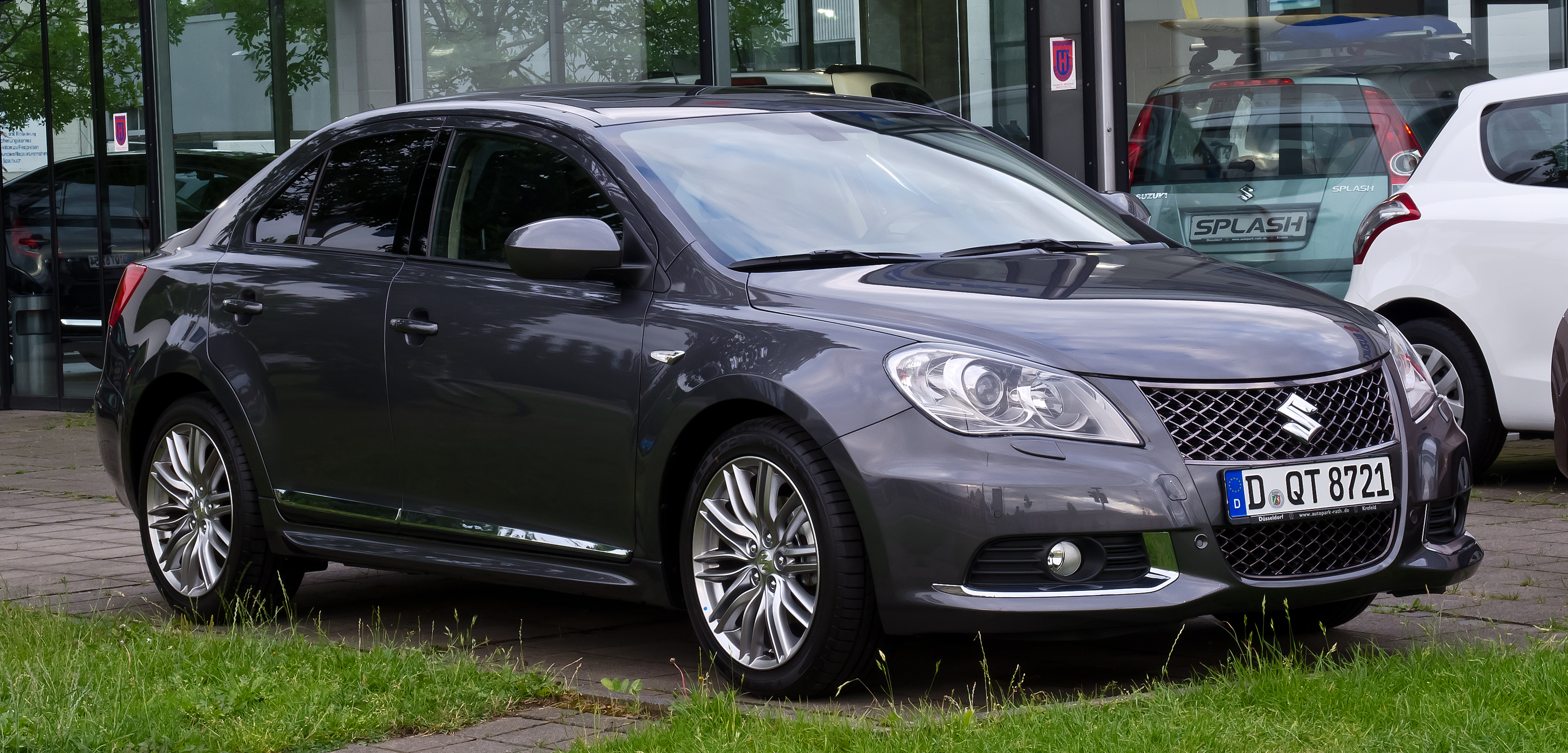
- Suzuki Kizashi 2.4

Overview
- Manufacturer: Suzuki
- Model code: RE/RF91S
- Production: October 2009–December 2015
- Model years: 2010–2014
- Assembly: Makinohara, Shizuoka, Japan (Suzuki Sagara Assembly Plant)

Body and chassis
- Class: Mid-size car
- Body style: 4-door sedan
- Layout: Front-engine, front-wheel-drive/four-wheel-drive

Powertrain
- Engine: 2.4 L J24B I4
- Transmission: 6-speed manual CVT

Dimensions
- Wheelbase: 2,700 mm (106.3 in)
- Length: 4,650 mm (183.1 in)
- Width: 1,820 mm (71.7 in)
- Height: 1,480 mm (58.3 in)
- Curb weight: 1,470 kilograms (3,241 lb)

Chronology
- Predecessor: Suzuki Verona

The Suzuki Kizashi is a mid-size car manufactured by Japanese automaker Suzuki. It was unveiled in the United States on July 30, 2009. The Kizashi went on sale in Japan on October 21, 2009, in North America on December 1, 2009, and in Australia and New Zealand on May 11, 2010. It is the first mid-size Suzuki automobile sold in the Australian market. In February 2011, the Kizashi became available to the Indian market. The car was also available in European markets.

In December 2013, Suzuki announced that the Kizashi would be gradually discontinued in global markets, and would not get a successor. Despite a good technical record, the car had suffered from poor sales because of the Great Recession and Suzuki's withdrawal from the American and Canadian markets in 2013 and 2014, respectively. In December 2015, production of the car ceased in the Sagara plant.

== Etymology ==
Kizashi (In kanji: 兆) is a Japanese word which means "something great is coming", "omen", "sign", or "warning".

== Description and models ==
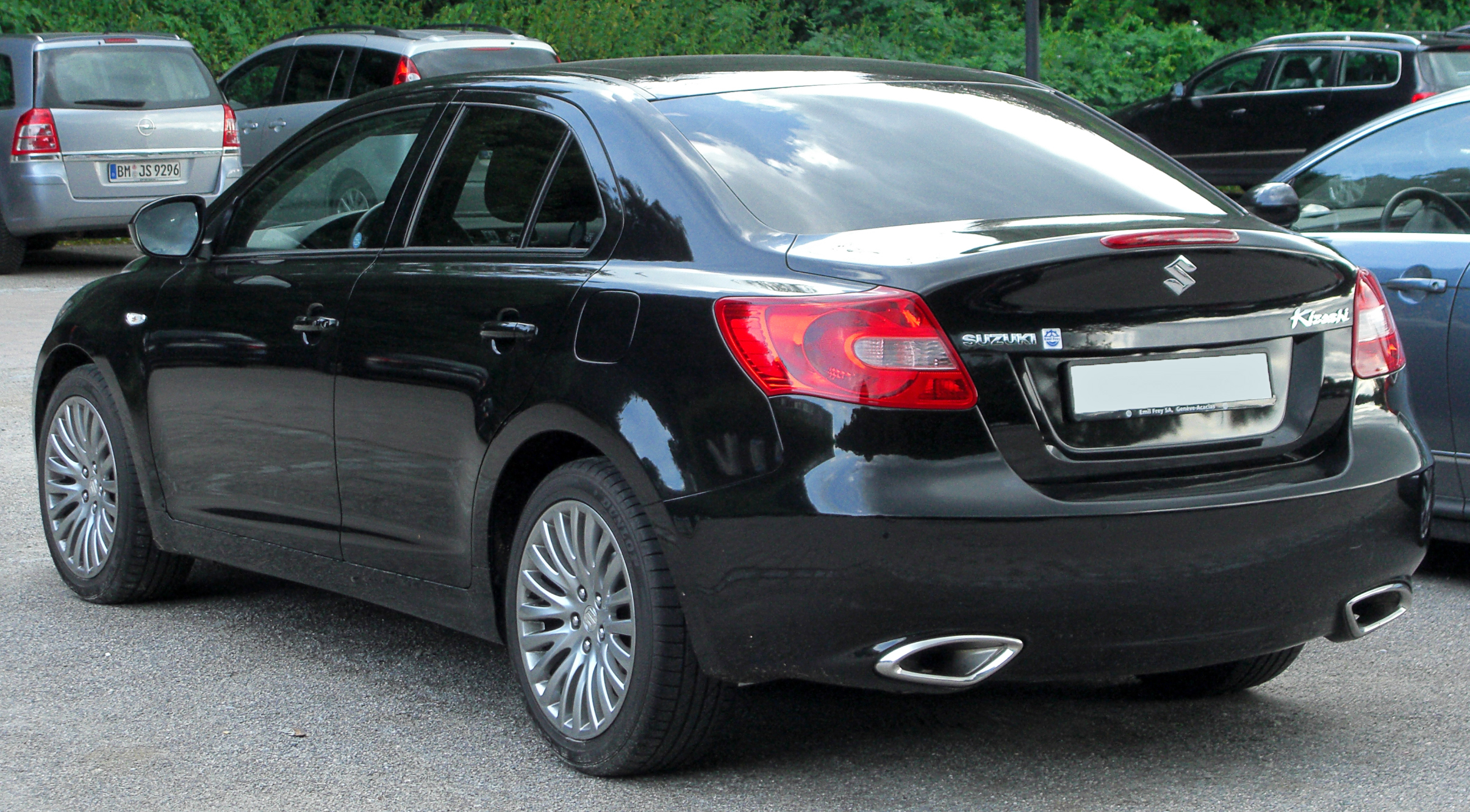
Rear view

Suzuki Kizashi is a family sedan sized between compact and mid-size models. It is available in base, SE, Sport GTS and Sport SLS trims.

Standard equipment includes front-wheel drive (FWD) and a 2.4-liter four-cylinder engine developing 185 hp (138 kW; 188 PS) and 170 lb⋅ft (230 N⋅m) of torque. The engine was a more powerful version of the unit installed in the contemporary Grand Vitara (Escudo). The Kizashi came with a long list of standard features, including keyless entry, keyless start, automatic dual climate control, and projector headlamps. All wheel drive was also available on all models besides the base "S". Available transmissions are a 6-speed manual (FWD only) or a continuously variable transmission (CVT). The Kizashi offers 17 and 18-inch alloy wheels, Akebono sourced brakes, a choice of cloth or leather seating surfaces, and a 425-watt Rockford Fosgate audio system with iPod connectivity and Bluetooth capability (some models do not provide Bluetooth capability). All-wheel drive (AWD) (based on the i-AWD system featured in the SX4) is optional and includes a driver-activated FWD mode to save fuel.

== Safety ==
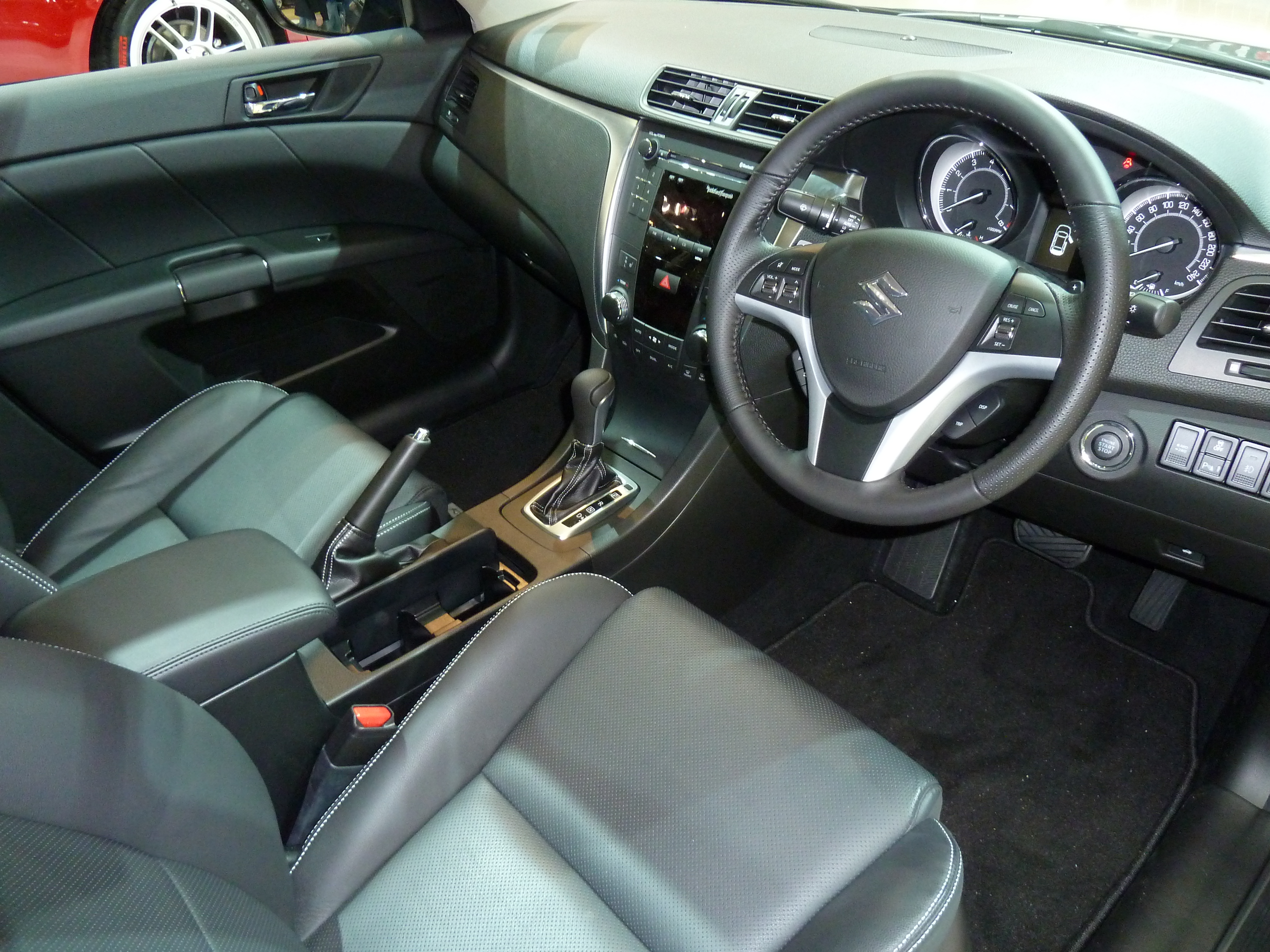
Interior

The Kizashi comes standard with antilock brakes, traction and stability control, front and rear side airbags and full-length side curtain airbags. An enhanced stability control system is included with the available all-wheel drive.

The Kizashi has a 5-star safety rating from ANCAP.

ANCAP test results* Suzuki Kizashi (2011)
Test	Score
Overall	5 /5 stars
Frontal offset	14.83/16
Side impact	16/16
Pole	2/2
Seat belt reminders	2/3
Whiplash protection	Not Assessed
Pedestrian protection	Marginal
Electronic stability control	Standard

== Awards ==
In 2010 and 2011, Kizashi won two AutoPacific's annual Vehicle Satisfaction Awards for overall satisfaction among all new midsize cars sold or leased in the United States.

In 2011, Suzuki Kizashi named Best Buy by Consumers Digest.

In December 2010, the Kizashi won two motoring awards in New Zealand: the Supreme Winner in the 2010 AA Motoring Excellence Awards and the New Zealand Herald Car of the Year Award. The car was praised for its astonishing attention to detail, refinement and comfort.

== Markets ==
=== Japan ===
In Japan, the Kizashi was only available in a single version, fitted with the CVT transmission with the option of four-wheel drive, and was only available built to order. Suzuki sold 3,379 units between 2009 and 2015; the company stopped taking orders for the car in September 2015. The Kizashi was not a success – it was subject to heavy additional taxation thanks to its large (over 2 liters) engine and overall width, while sales were further hampered by the Suzuki brand's connotation with kei cars in Japan, rather than with large sedans. Of the 3,379 vehicles sold, one quarter was acquired by the National Police Agency (Japan), meaning that sales to the public averaged only about 30 examples per month for the duration of its time in the market.

=== India ===
Maruti Suzuki, 54.2% owned by Suzuki Motor Corporation, launched the Maruti Kizashi on February 2, 2011. It is imported as a Completely Built Unit (CBU), which attracts import duties of 105%. It was priced at around 16 to 17.5 lakh rupees. It has since been withdrawn from the Indian market due to poor sales.

This model has a J24B 2.4-litre petrol engine with 4 cylinders, 16 valves DOHC. The 2393 cc engine is capable of producing 185 hp (138 kW; 188 PS) at 6,500 rpm (manual transmission) and 180 hp (134 kW; 182 PS) at 6,000 rpm (CVT). It produces 170 lb⋅ft (230 N⋅m) of torque at 4,000 rpm. The Maruti Kizashi utilizes a direct ignition system for increased fuel efficiency with decreased emissions. With the help of this and other engine technologies, the car gives 9 km/L in the city and 12 km/L on the highway. The fuel tank capacity of the car is 63 L. Maruti Suzuki though, has not been able to sell many units since the Kizashi is petrol only, and the high cost.

=== Pakistan ===
The last place where the Kizashi was on sale was Pakistan, after it had been removed from other markets. Pak Suzuki Motors, a subsidiary of Suzuki Motor Corporation in Pakistan, launched the Suzuki Kizashi on February 11, 2015, at Pearl Continental Hotel, Lahore. It was imported as a Completely Built-up Unit (CBU) with no plans to manufacture it locally. The ex-factory price at launch was PKR 5.0 million.

== Problems ==
On June 28, 2010, Suzuki recalled 5,107 model year 2010 Kizashi vehicles due to a glove box door that failed to comply with FMVSS 201 ("Occupant Protection in Interior Impact") in which the door could open in a crash.

On July 30, 2014, Suzuki recalled an undisclosed number of select model year 2010–2013 Kizashi vehicles manufactured October 2009 through July 2012 as spiders could weave webs into the evaporative canister causing it to become blocked and creating excessive negative pressure within the fuel tank. Negative pressure could cause the fuel tank to crack, resulting in a higher risk of fire.

== Sales ==
Suzuki Kizashi North American Yearly Sales Figures
Calendar year	United States	Canada	Mexico
2009	71	–	48
2010	6138	688	666
2011	6942	734	598
2012	5566	688	406
2013	1602	365	235
2014	–	–	274
2015	–	–	163
2016	–	–	83

== Concept versions ==
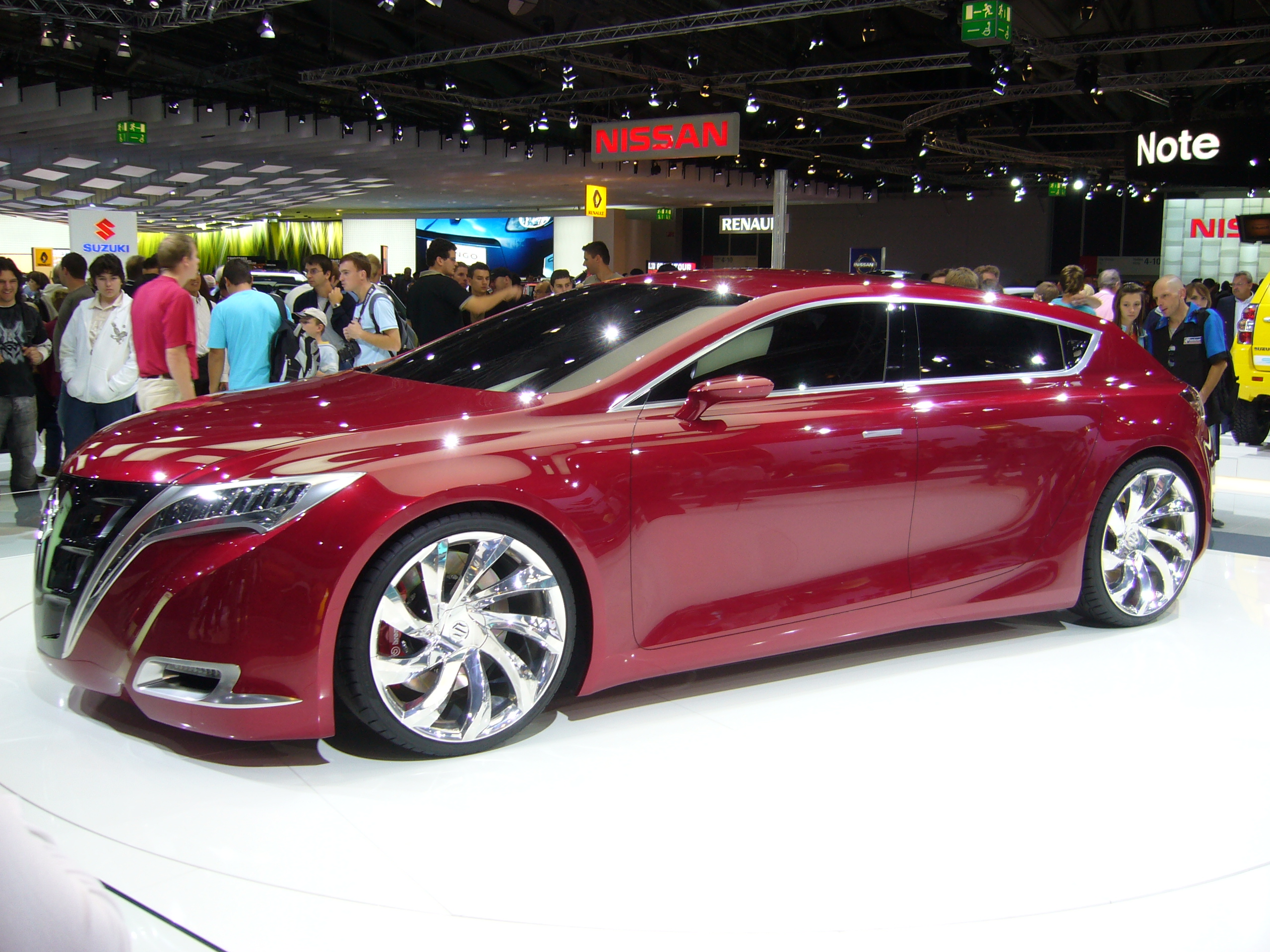
Kizashi 1 concept

=== 2007–2008 ===
Concept Kizashi 1

The first Kizashi concept included a 2.0L 16-valve turbo diesel engine, sequential 6-speed transmission, 21-inch aluminium alloy wheels, and AWD. It was unveiled at the 2007 Frankfurt Motor Show.

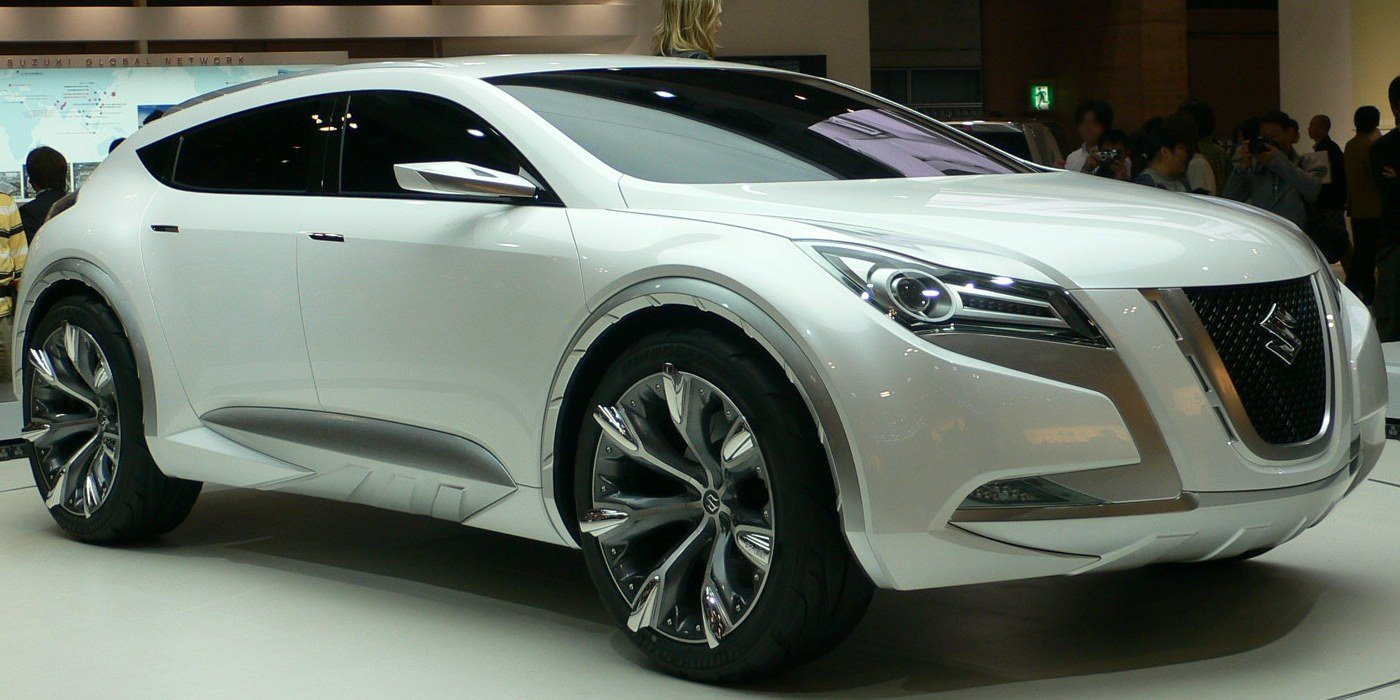
Kizashi 2 concept

Concept Kizashi 2

The second Kizashi concept was a 5-door crossover sport wagon that included a 3.6 L (3,564 cc) V6 engine, 6-speed automatic transmission, i-AWD, and 265/45ZR22 tires. It was unveiled at the 2007 Tokyo Motor Show.

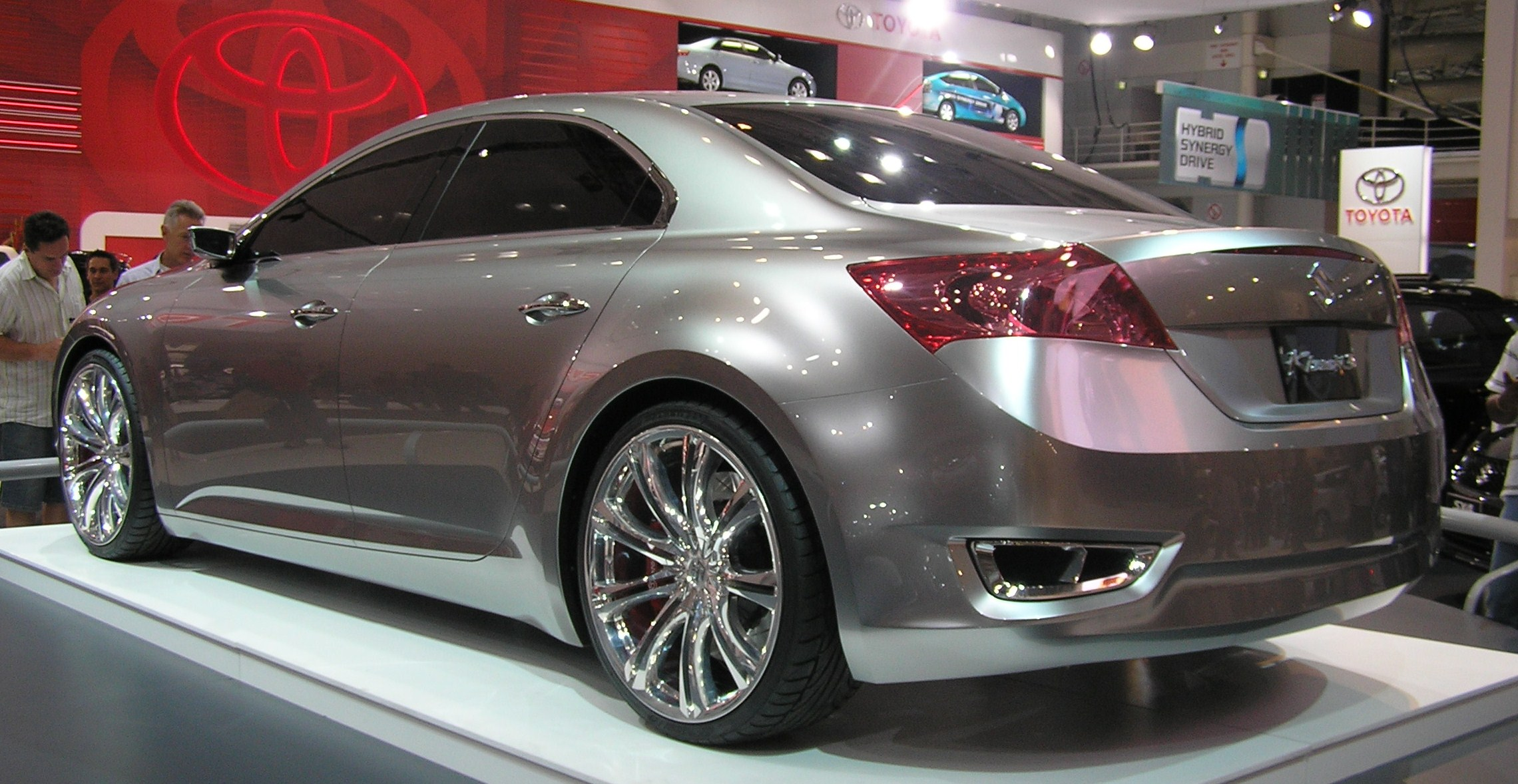
Kizashi 3 concept

Concept Kizashi 3

The third Kizashi concept was an AWD vehicle that included a 3.6 L (3,564 cc) V6 engine rated at 300 hp (224 kW; 304 PS), 6-speed automatic transmission, and 21-inch aluminium wheels with 255/30ZR21 tires. The Concept Kizashi 3 was unveiled at the 2008 New York International Auto Show.

=== 2011 New York International Auto Show ===
Kizashi Apex

The Apex concept was aimed at performance enthusiast buyers and featured a new turbocharged engine outputting approximately 205 to 224 kW (275 to 300 hp), sports tires and wheels, and exterior paint job inspired by the company's motorcycles.

Kizashi EcoCharge

Suzuki's hybrid was powered by a 2.0 L gasoline engine, which was "boosted" by a 15 kW, belt-driven electric motor to deliver a combined 144 hp (107 kW; 146 PS) and 127 lb⋅ft (172 N⋅m) of torque. The new hybrid drivetrain was further aided in its quest for improved fuel efficiency by a six-speed automatic transmission, low rolling resistance tires, regenerative braking, and stop-start technology, which added up to a significant mpg improvement compared to the current, conventional Suzuki. Steve Younan, director of automotive marketing and product planning for American Suzuki Motor Corporation, said that the company was making plans to move forward with such a product, and that "the proof of (Suzuki’s) concept is that the Kizashi EcoCharge has the capability to deliver a 25 % fuel economy gain in real-world driving through an electric charge to the powertrain system while still retaining the production Kizashi's dynamic handling and braking advantages that make it a standout category performer." A Kizashi hybrid never did enter production.
