= Maragatería =

Historical region in the province of León, Spain

Coordinates: 42.4197°N 6.1941°W

Location of la Maragateria in the province of Leon

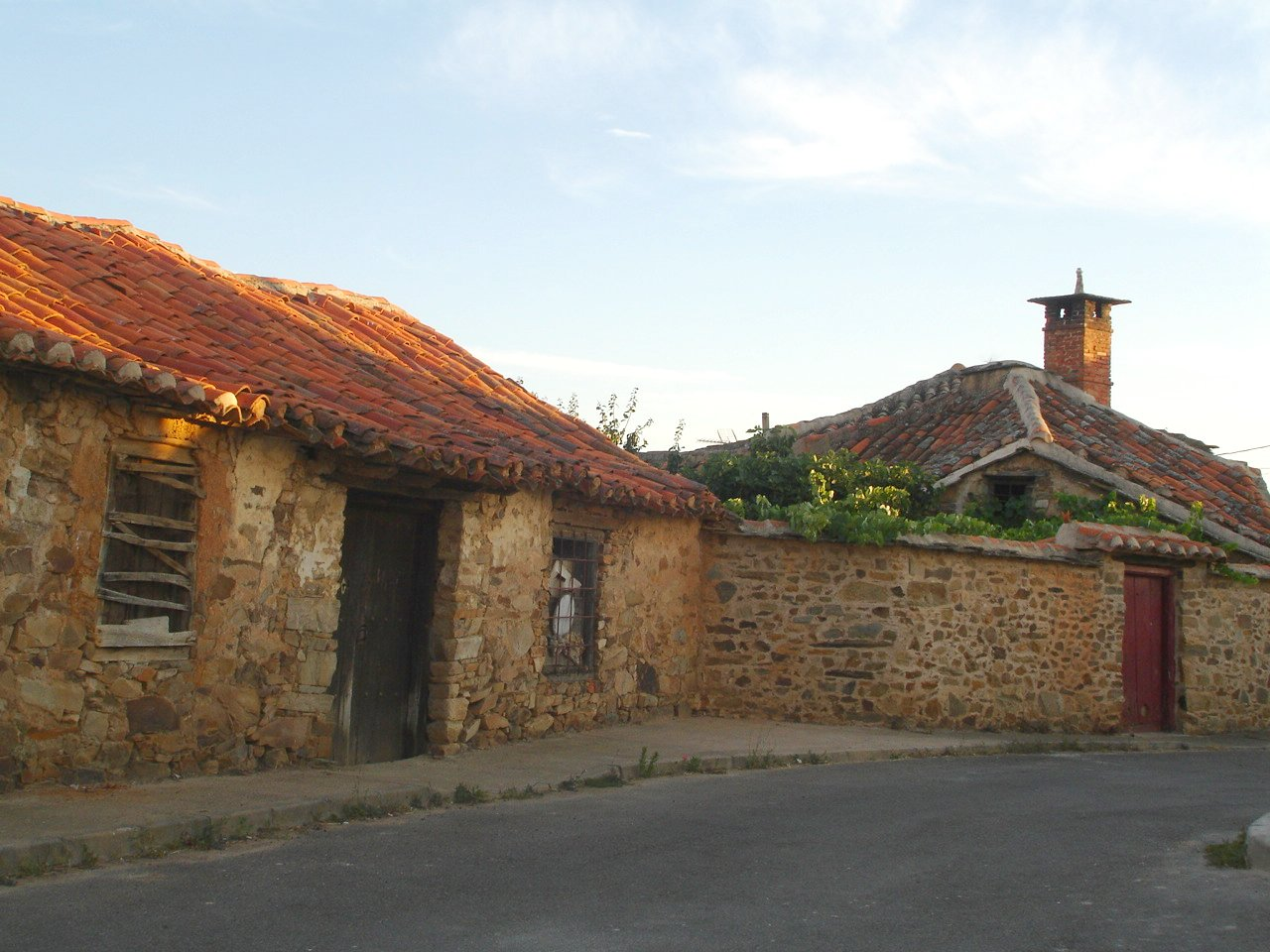
Characteristic Maragato stone houses in Valdespino de Somoza.

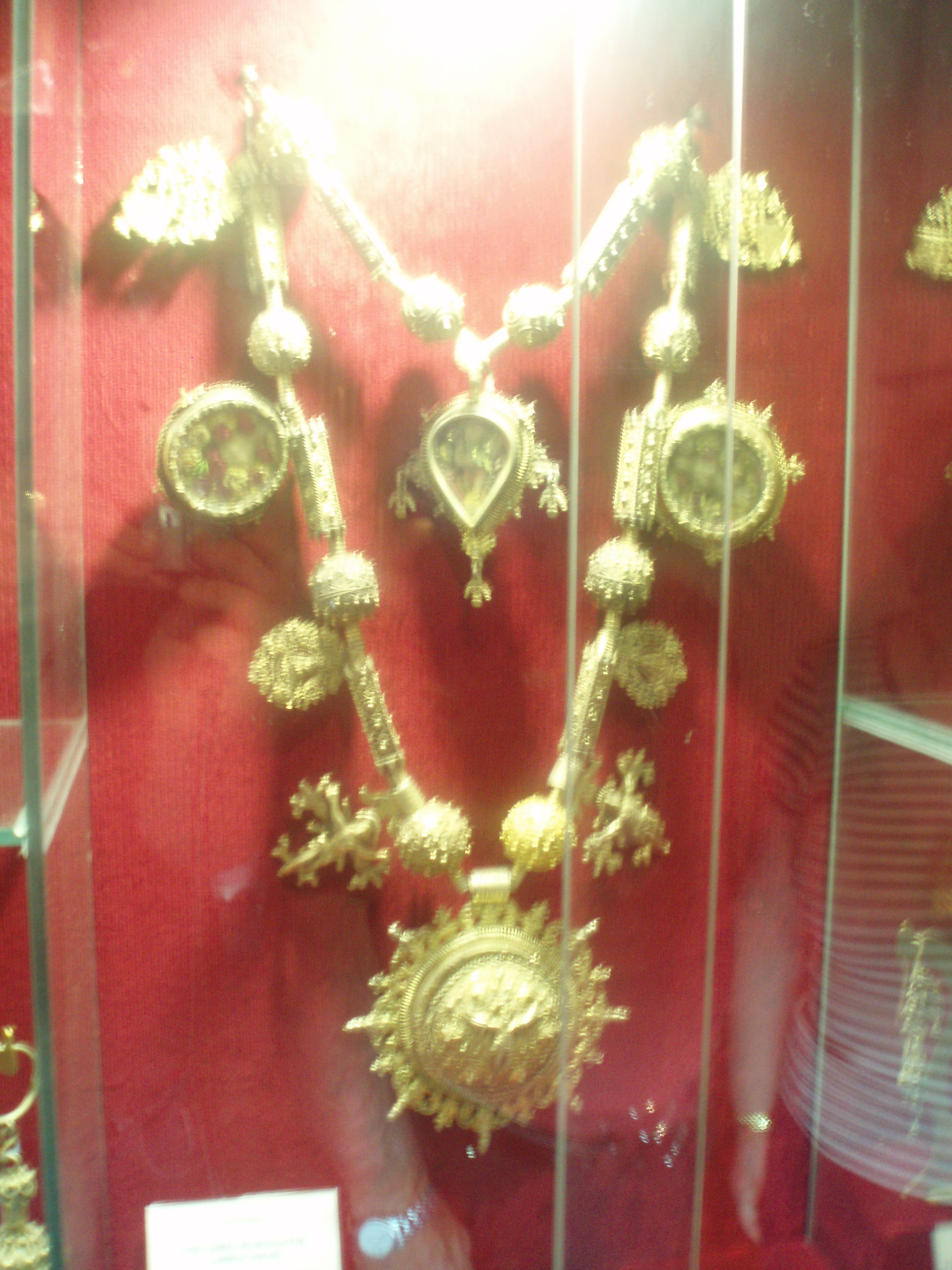
Traditional adorments of a Maragata

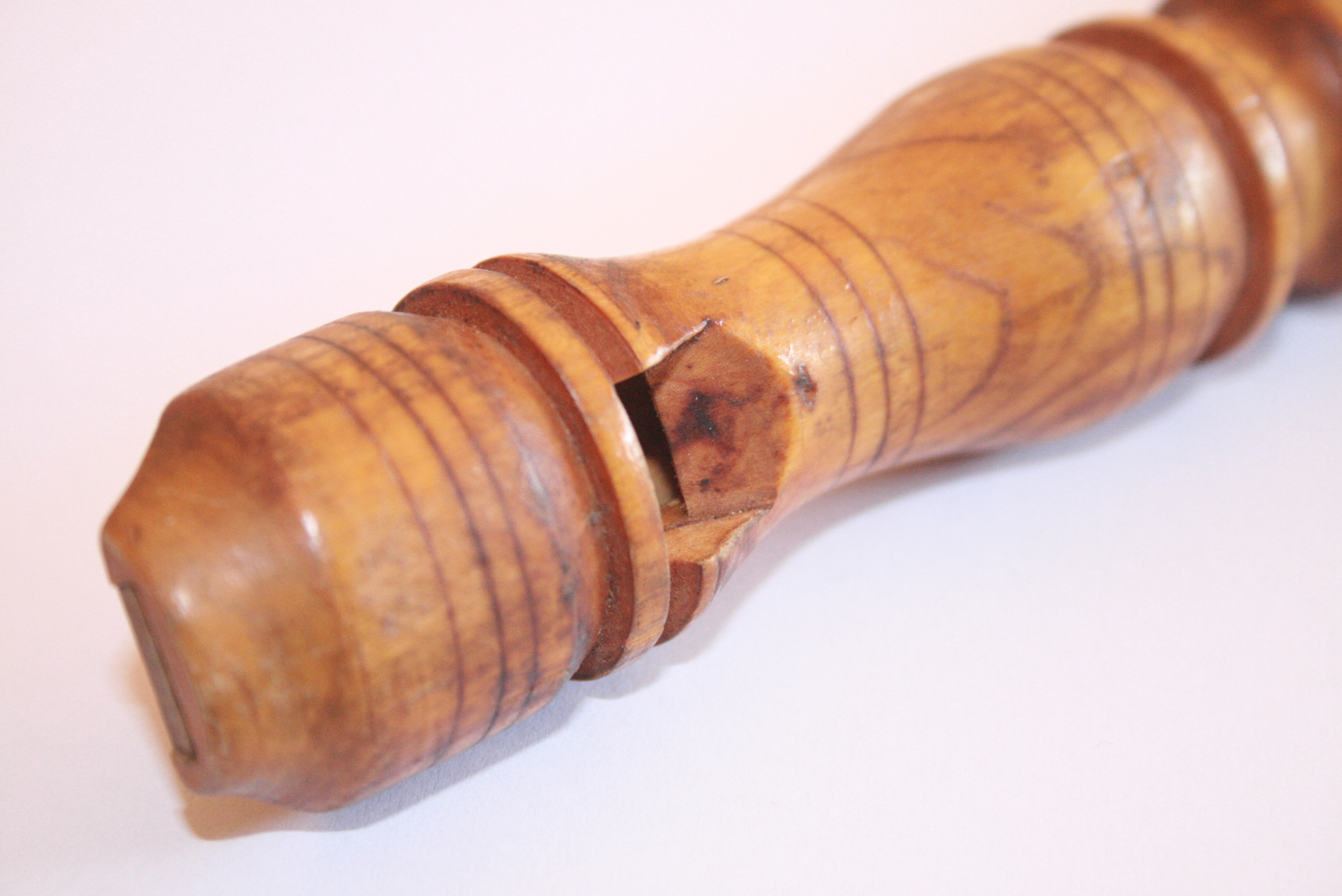
Detail of the mouthpiece of a Chifla, traditional flute from La Maragateria

La Maragatería or País de los Maragatos (Tierra de Maragatos in Leonese language), is an ancient historical region or traditional comarca in the landlocked Province of León, Spain. It borders with La Cepeda comarca in the north, La Valduerna in the south, with the comarcas of El Bierzo and La Cabrera in the west and southwest, and in the east with La Vega del Tuerto and La Valduerna.

La Maragatería encompasses lesser comarcas, like the Alta Maragatería, Baja Maragatería and the Somoza Comarca. Its inhabitants are known as "Maragatos". Leonese language is widely used in this shire.

== Municipalities ==
The main municipalities making up the comarca are:

- Astorga, the main town
- Brazuelo
- Lucillo
- Luyego
- Santa Colomba de Somoza
- Santiago Millas
- Val de San Lorenzo

== Culture ==
The Maragatos form a small ethnic and cultural community with distinctive customs and architecture. The Maragata women used to wear a striking regional dress that made them stand out when they travelled to other parts of Spain.

Cocido Maragato (Cocíu maragatu in Leonese language) is a traditional local soup dish with meat.

Tierra de Maragatos has its own traditional way of building stone houses with large doors. Some of them have been preserved.

== See also ==
- Astorga
- Comarca de La Cabrera
- Mantecadas
