= Bisquets Obregón =

Mexican fast casual restaurant chain

Los Bisquets de Obregòn

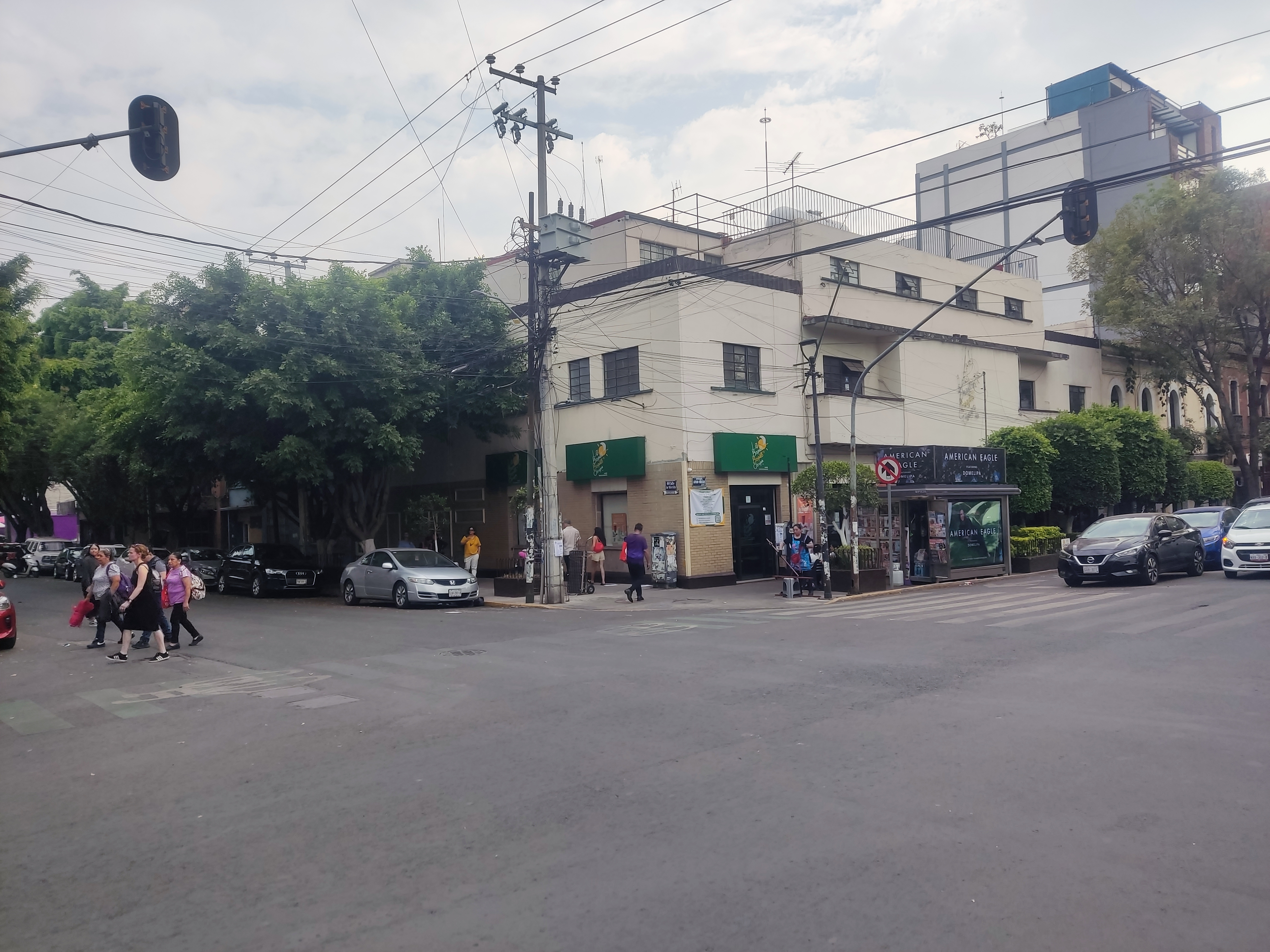
- The first restaurant on Avenida Álvaro Obregón

Restaurant information
- Established: 29 September 1945; 81 years ago
- Owners: Pan y Café de Tradición, S.A. de C.V.
- Food type: Fast casual; Mexican
- Location: Mexico
- Other information: Over 120 establishments in Mexico (2023)
- Website: bisquetsobregon.com

Bisquets Obregón (alternatively known as Los Bisquets de Obregón and Los Bisquets Bisquets Obregón) is a Mexican casual restaurant chain. It was opened in September 1945 on Avenida Álvaro Obregón, Colonia Roma, Mexico City. By the 1960s, the business expanded within Greater Mexico City. The chain model began in 1995 with the first franchise in Cancún, Quintana Roo. By 2023, the restaurant had grown to have over 120 establishments across Mexico. It primarily offers à la carte Mexican food, along with coffee and a diverse selection of pan dulce.

== History ==
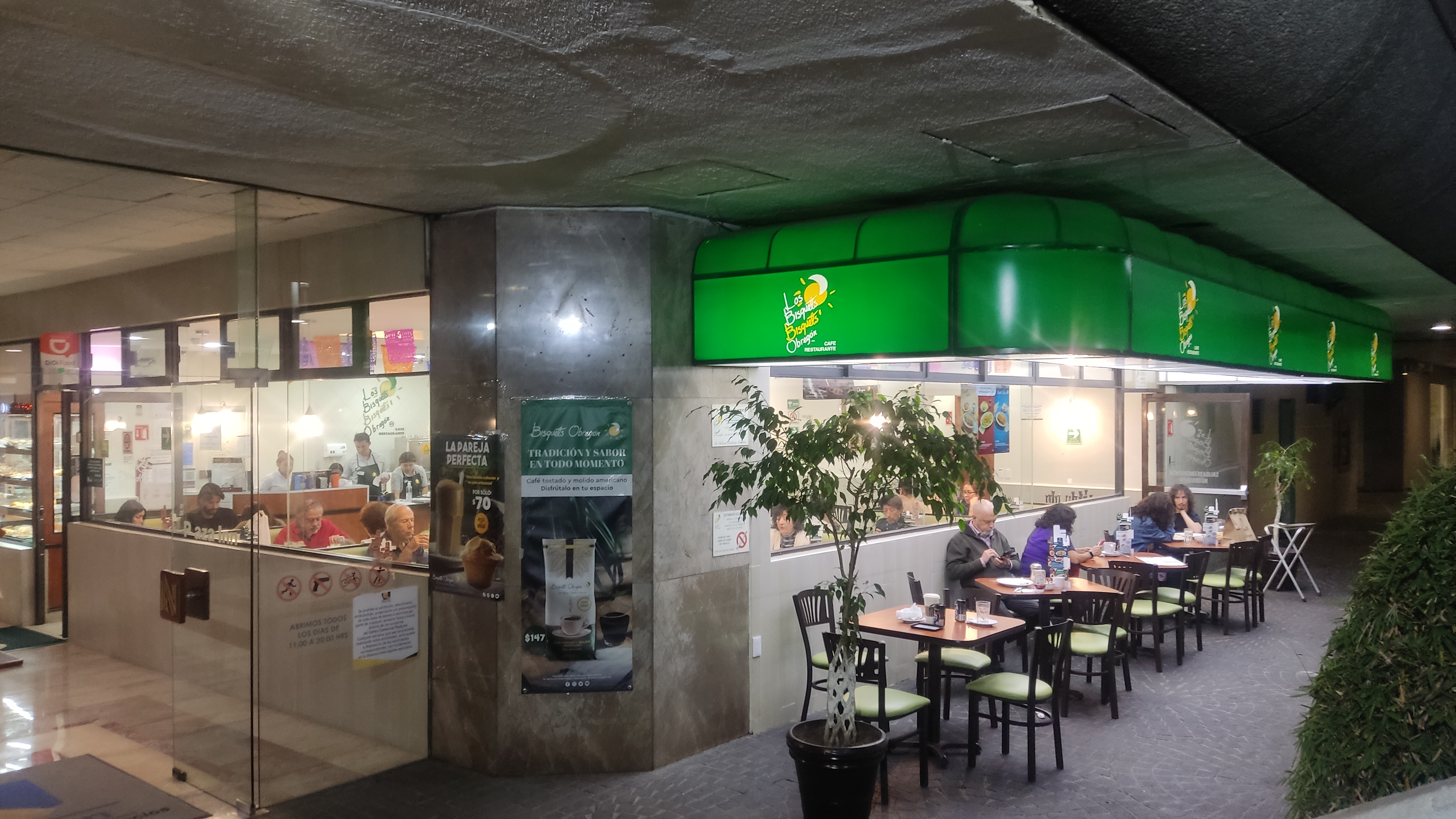
A restaurant franchise in Plaza Inn, San Ángel

The restaurant brand began as a Chinese-style coffeehouse called La Perla de Oriente, located on Avenida Álvaro Obregón in Colonia Roma, Mexico City. The establishment was later acquired by Isidro, a baker, who invited his nephew, Miguel Ángel Mancera Segura (father of Miguel Ángel Mancera), to join him in the business. By 1960, new locations had opened in Plaza Inn and Ciudad Satélite, both in Greater Mexico City. In 1980, the name was rebranded as Bisquets Álvaro Obregón. In 1995, the brand shifted to a restaurant chain model. The first franchise location opened in Cancún, Quintana Roo.

As of 2023, there were 120 restaurants across the country. Franchisees can purchase a license to operate a location for ten years, with an option to renew. According to El Financiero, the cost ranges from US$40,950 to US$65,000, plus taxes.

== Description ==
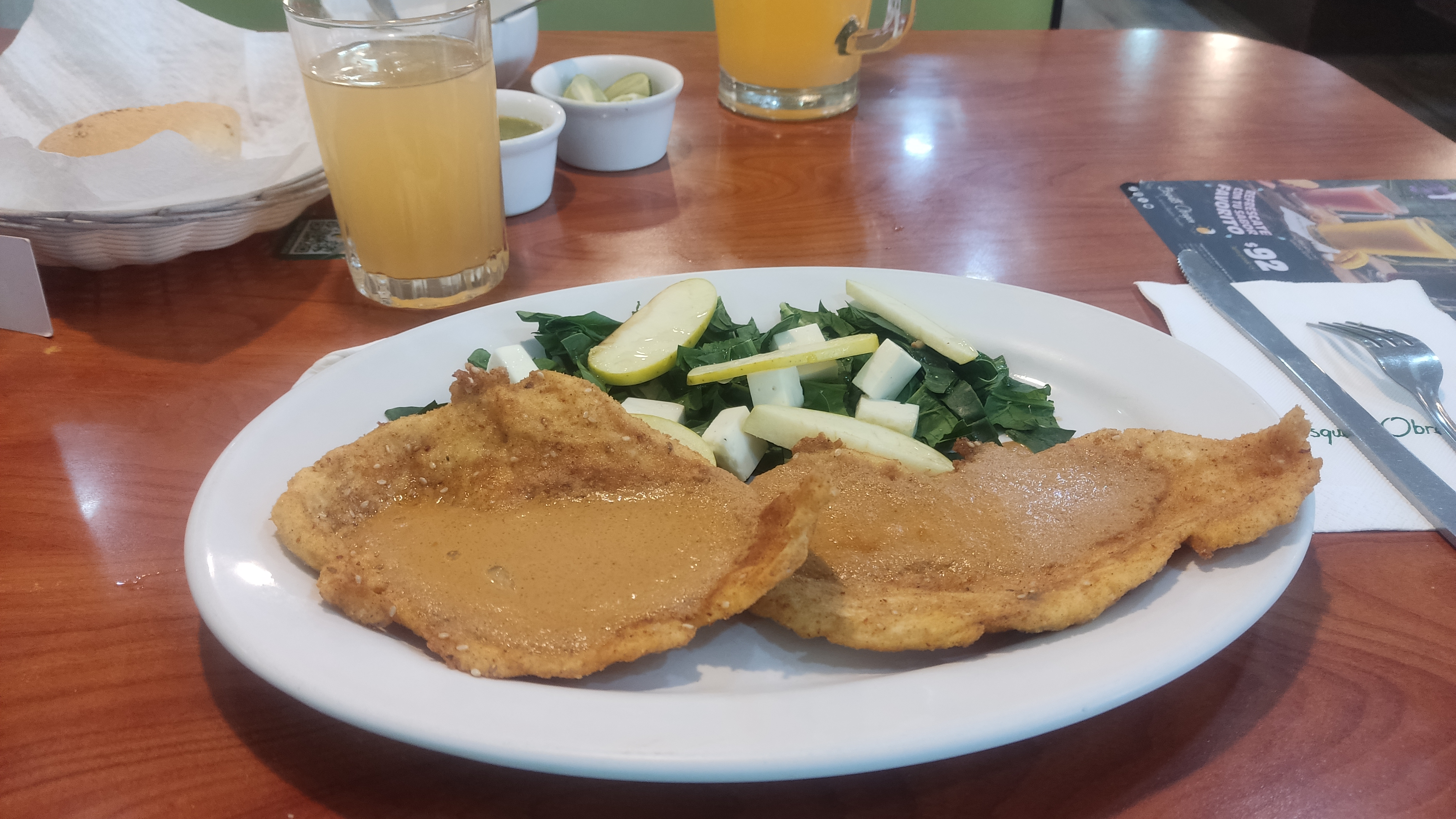
Breaded chicken fillets in chipotle pesto sauce, served with an apple salad.

Bisquets Obregón offers Mexican cuisine through both á la carte and set menu options. The restaurant serves coffee sourced from Oaxaca and Chiapas, which may be served with milk. Bread offerings include biscuits, which can be accompanied by marmalade, or astorgas.
