= Monastery of Santa María de Retuerta =

Hotel and former monastery in Sardón de Duero, Spain

Coordinates: 41.6169°N 4.41072°W

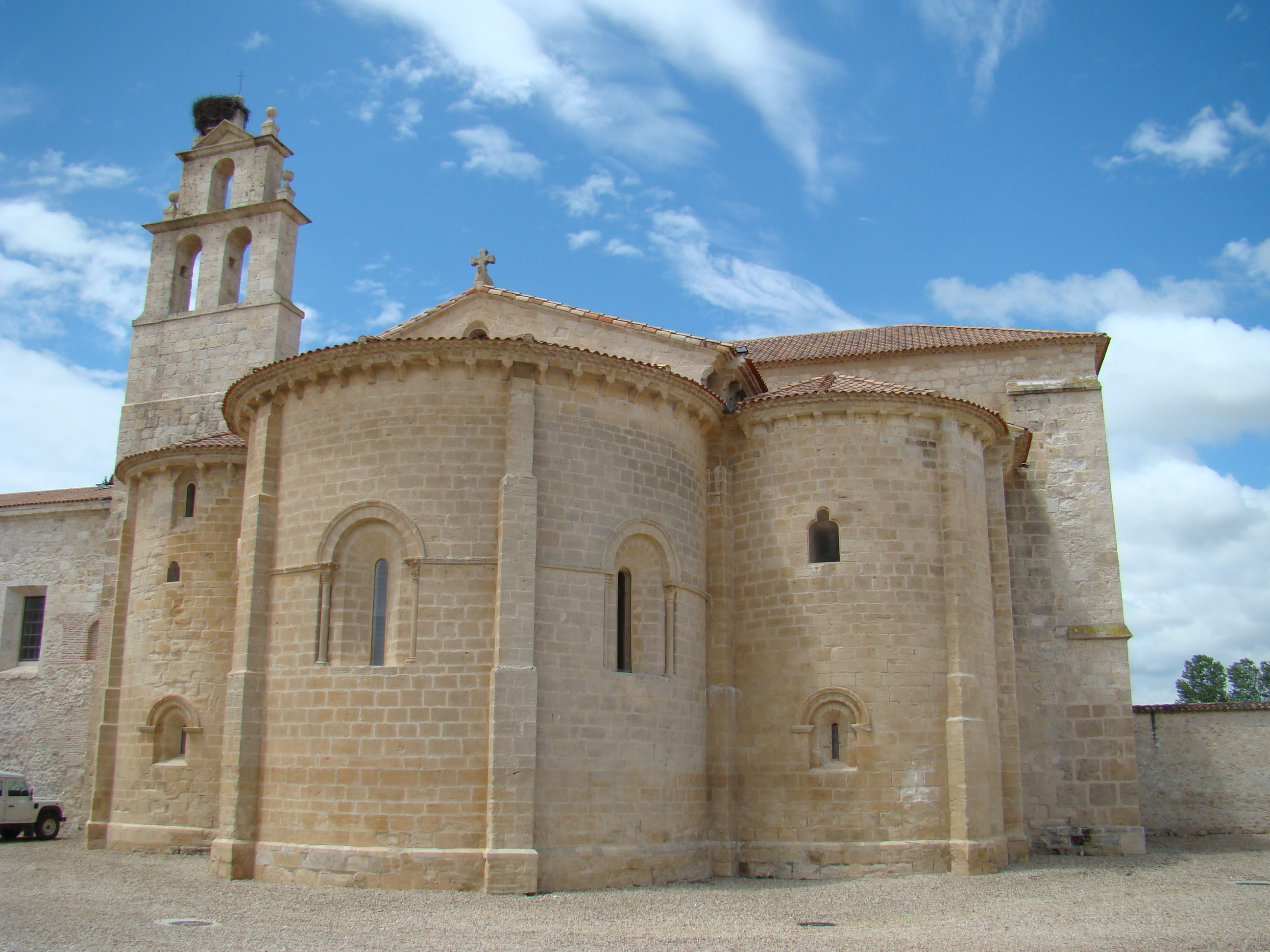
The Hotel Abadía Retuerta LeDomaine was originally the Monastery of Santa María de Retuerta

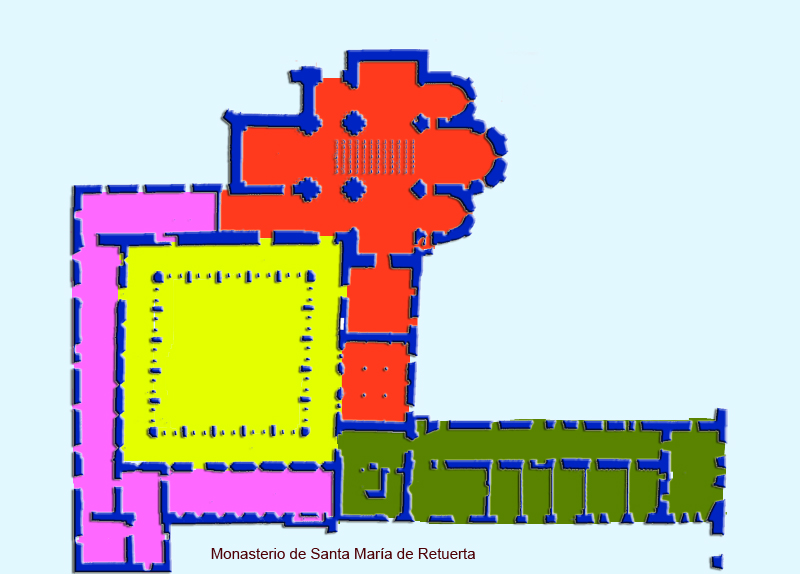
Plan

Hotel Abadía Retuerta LeDomaine, the former Monastery of Santa María de Retuerta, is located on the left bank of the river Duero, near the town of Sardón de Duero, in the province of Valladolid, autonomous community of Castile and León, Spain. The monastery belonged to the Premonstratensians and was built during the period of 1146 through the 15th century in late-Romanesque style. It was founded by Sancho Ansúrez, grandson of Count Pedro Ansúrez. The building was declared a Monumento Histórico-Artístico of national interest on June 3, 1931, and then a Bien de Interés Cultural. More recently, it has been transformed into a hotel, and belongs to the privately owned business group Novartis. In 2016, it was awarded as the best tourist hotel by Fitur.

== Bibliography ==
- ANDRÉS GONZÁLEZ, PATRICIA Monasterio de Santa María de Retuerta. Guía breve. Edita: Edilesa, 2005. ISBN 84-8012-503-9.
- ANDRÉS GONZÁLEZ, PATRICIA Monasterios premostratenses en Castilla y León. Las grandes órdenes monacales en Castilla y León. Editorial Edilesa, 2002.
- Herrera Marcos, Jesús, Arquitectura y simbolismo del románico en Valladolid. Edita Ars Magna, 1997. Diputación de Valladolid. ISBN 84-923230-0-0
