= Oteruelo de la Valduerna =

- Minor local entity
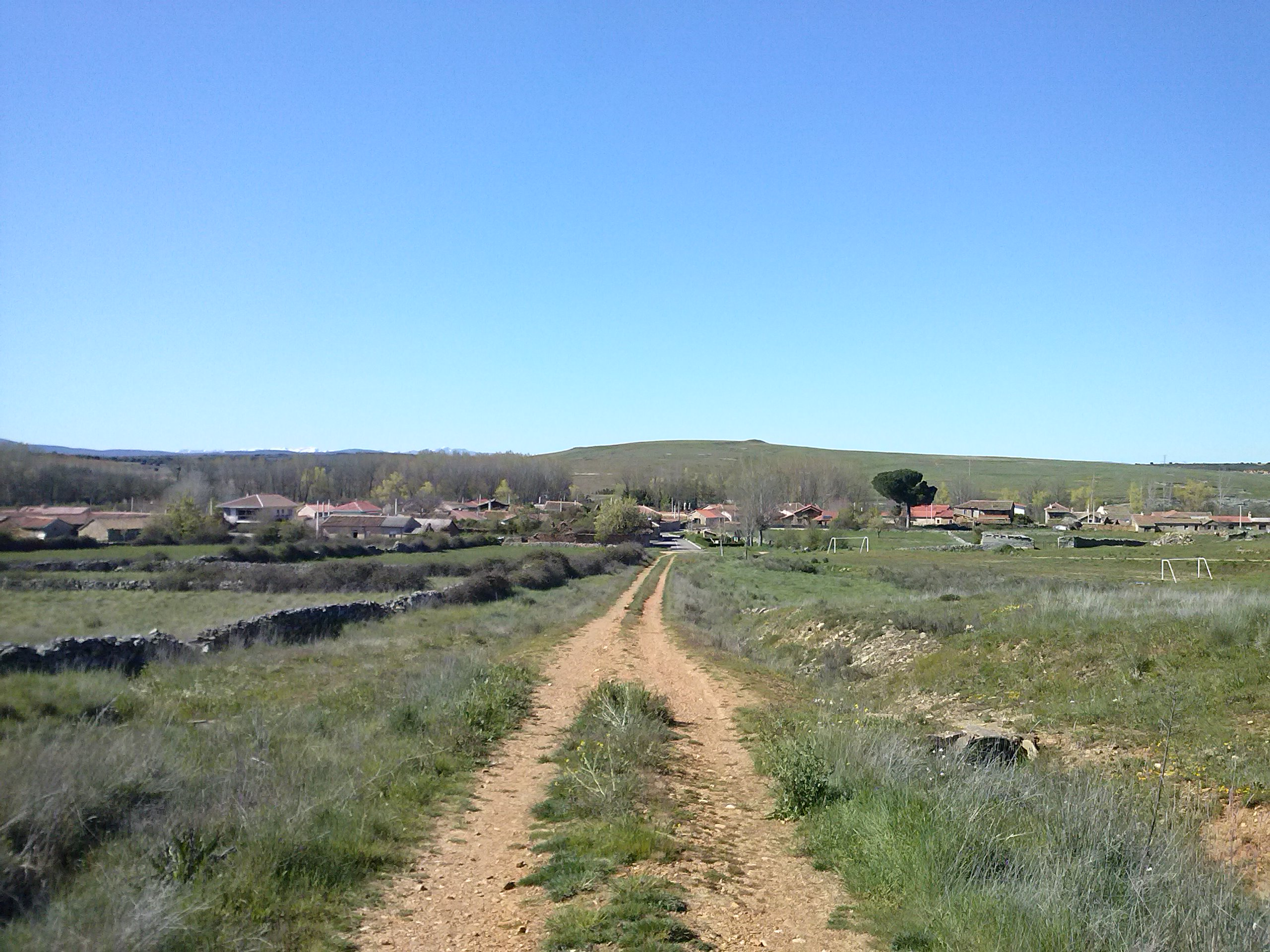

- Location within Province of León Location within Castile and León Location within Spain
- Coordinates: 42°25′10″N 6°5′24″W
- Country: Spain
- Autonomous community: Castile and León
- Province: Province of León
- Municipality: Santiago Millas
- Elevation: 860 m (2,820 ft)

Population
  - Total: 25

Oteruelo de la Valduerna is a locality and minor local entity located in the municipality of Santiago Millas, in León province, Castile and León, Spain. As of 2020, it has a population of 25.

== Geography ==
Oteruelo de la Valduerna is located 55km west-southwest of León, Spain.
