= José Ramón Amieva =

Mexican politician

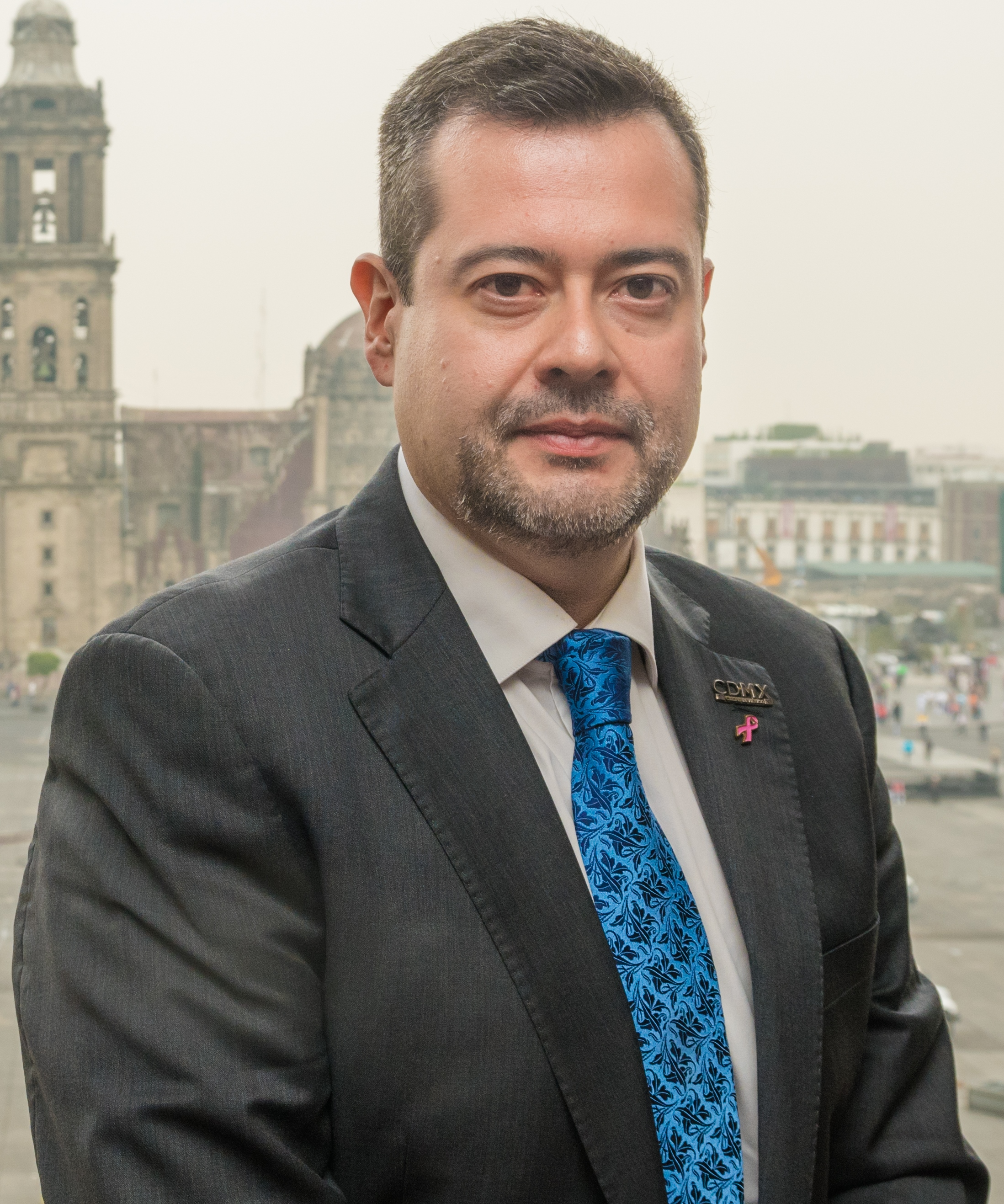
- Amieva in 2015

Municipal president of Mixquiahuala de Juárez
- In office 15 December 2020 – 13 July 2023
- Preceded by: Luz María Mendoza Pérez
- Succeeded by: Yonattan Álvarez Cruz

Head of Government of Mexico City
- Substitute
- In office 29 March 2018 – 4 December 2018
- Preceded by: Miguel Ángel Mancera
- Succeeded by: Claudia Sheinbaum

Personal details
- Born: José Ramón Amieva Gálvez; 30 August 1972 (age 54) Mixquiahuala de Juárez, Hidalgo
- Party: National Regeneration Movement (2020–present); Party of the Democratic Revolution (2000–2020)
- Children: 1
- Occupation: Politician and lawyer

José Ramón Amieva Gálvez (born 30 August 1972) is a Mexican lawyer and politician affiliated with the National Regeneration Movement and municipal president of Mixquiahuala de Juárez, Hidalgo (2020-2023). He previously served as the interim mayor of Mexico City in 2018. He was elected president of the Federal Court of Administrative Justice for a three-year term beginning in 2026.
