= Piedralba =

- Minor local entity
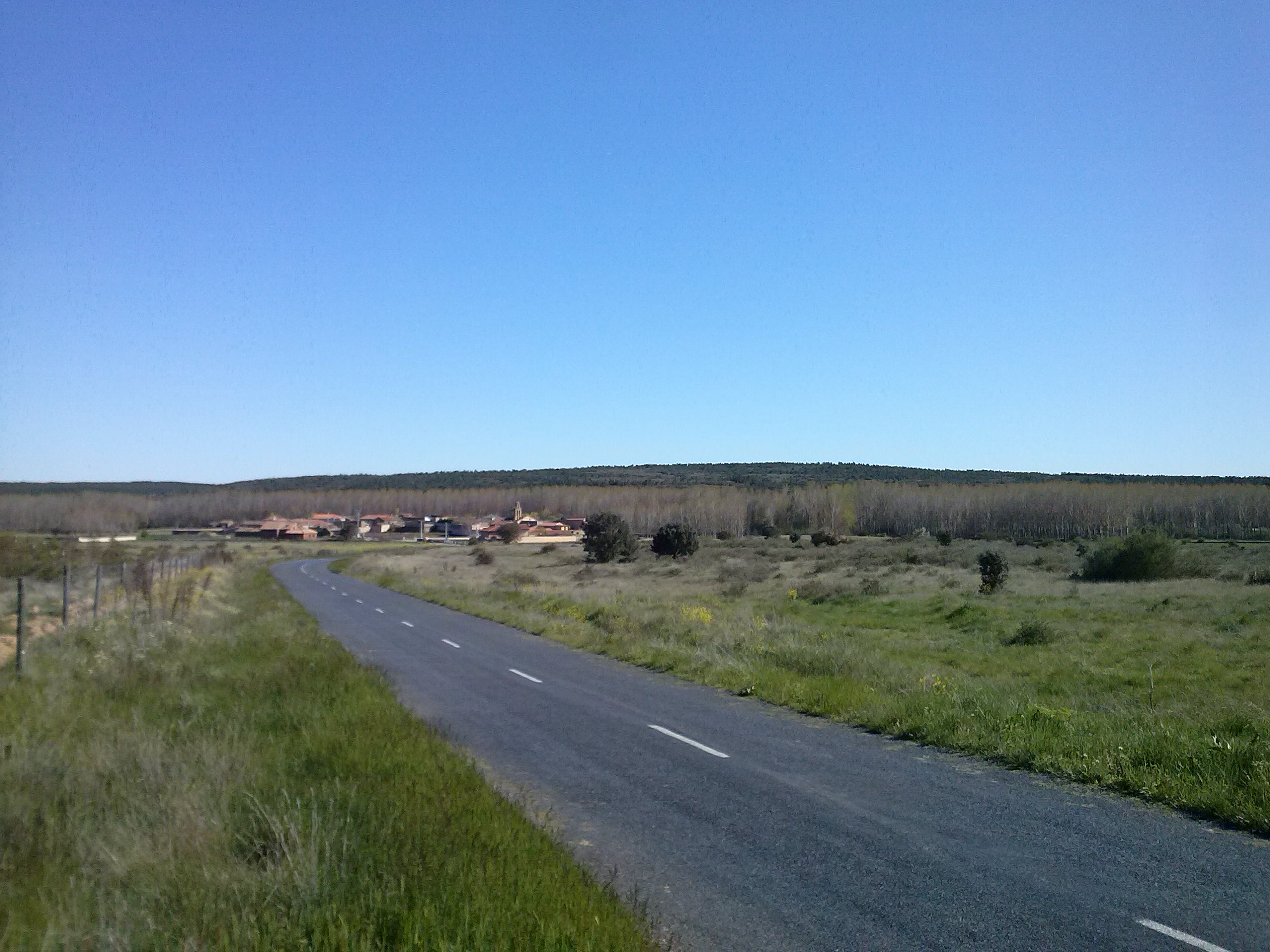

- Location within Province of León Location within Castile and León Location within Spain
- Coordinates: 42°25′28″N 6°4′19″W
- Country: Spain
- Autonomous community: Castile and León
- Province: Province of León
- Municipality: Santiago Millas
- Elevation: 856 m (2,808 ft)

Population
  - Total: 56

Piedralba is a locality and minor local entity located in the municipality of Santiago Millas, in León province, Castile and León, Spain. As of 2020, it has a population of 56.

== Geography ==
Piedralba is located 54km west-southwest of León, Spain.
