= Mixquiahuala =

Mixquiahuala de Juárez
- Town and municipality
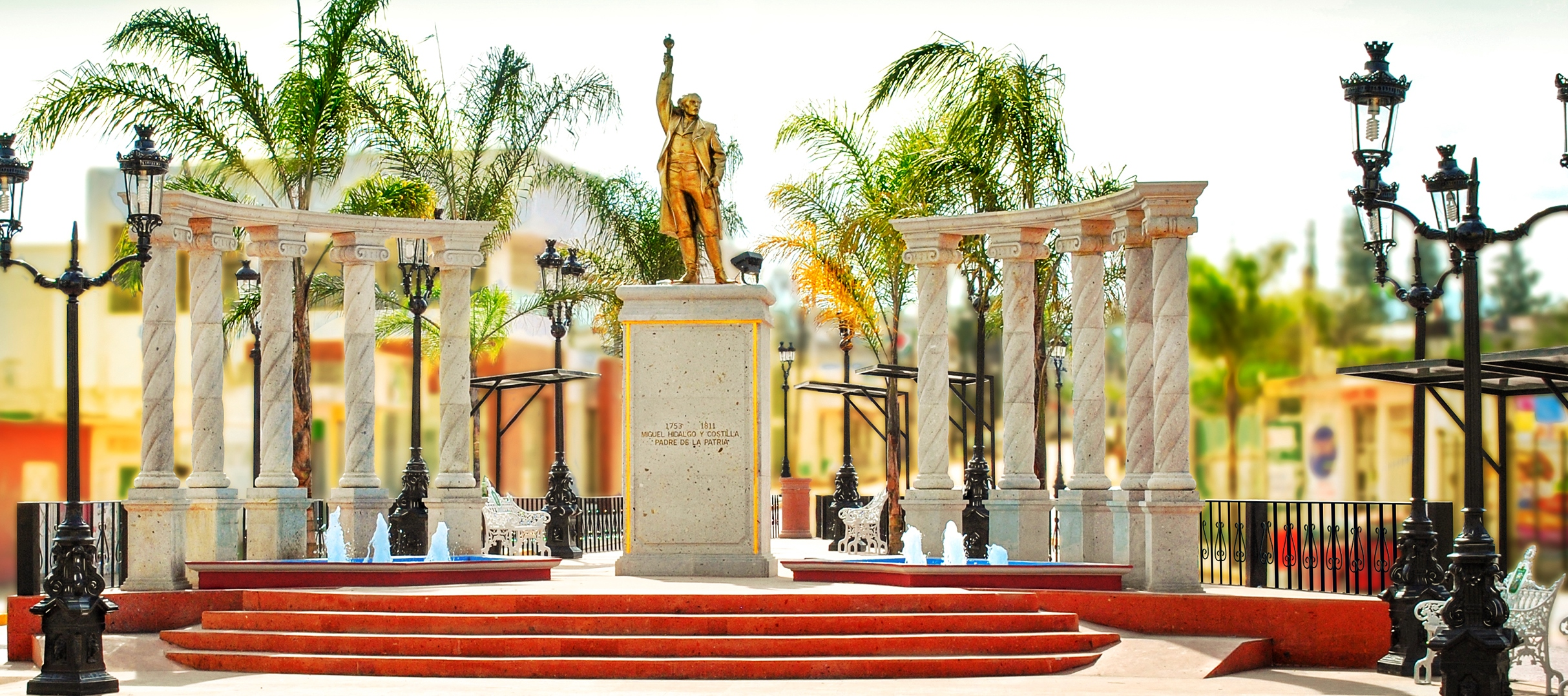
- Monument to Miguel Hidalgo in Mixquiahuala

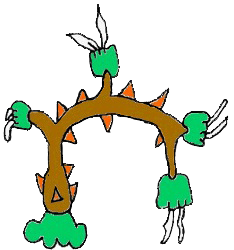
- Coat of arms

- Location within Hidalgo Location within Mexico
- Coordinates: 20°13′52″N 99°12′47″W
- Country: Mexico
- State: Hidalgo
- Municipality: Mixquiahuala de Juárez

Government
  - Municipal president: MORENA José Ramón Amieva (2020)
  - Federal electoral district: Hidalgo's 2nd

Area
  - Total: 138.1 km^{2} (53.3 sq mi)

Population (2005)
  - Total: 37,747
- Time zone: UTC-6 (Zona Centro)
- Website: mixquiahuala.hidalgo.gob.mx

Mixquiahuala (officially Mixquiahuala de Juárez; Otomi: Ntʼähi) is a town and one of the 84 municipalities of Hidalgo, in central-eastern Mexico. The municipality covers an area of 138.1 km^{2}.

As of 2005, the municipality had a total population of 37,747.
