= Escuela Nacional Preparatoria 6 "Antonio Caso" =

School's logo

The National Preparatory School #6 "Antonio Caso" (ENP 6), also known as "Escuela Preparatoria de Coyoacán" (Preparatory School of Coyoacan) belonging to the National Autonomous University of Mexico (UNAM), began operations in 1959. The Spanish name is: Escuela Nacional Preparatoria, Plantel 6 "Antonio Caso".

== History ==
=== Escuela Nacional Preparatoria ===
The National Preparatory School had a curriculum covering both scientific and humanistic subjects. Justo Sierra conceived of the National Preparatory School as the foundation of the University. It was an integral part of the University, until 1914 when the two institutions were separated. By 1929 the university received legal status for final reinstatement of the National Preparatory School.

=== La Casa de los Mascarones ===
By the year 1776, in the town of Tacuba, province of Mexico City where wealthy Spanish merchants settled their vacation homes, began the building by Don José Diego Hurtado de Mendoza, Peredo and Vineyard, seventh Earl of Valley Vicomte de Orizaba and San Miguel. When he died in 1771, the farm building was unfinished and remained abandoned until 1822, when it was sold at public auction, to be completed by Canon Manuel Moreno and Jove. It is since 1850 that the building has housed schools, from the College of Our Lady of Guadalupe, to the Science Institute, which closed in 1914 by order of the first Chief of the Constitutionalist Army, Venustiano Carranza, who expelled the Jesuits to take possession of property to the Federal Government and put in the service of the National School Teachers. Meanwhile, the National University of Mexico released the difficult years of the revolution and gained little by little, the principles and values that would give structure and life. Thus, it is from 1921, when he began his summer school courses, a hotbed of much of the faculty and staff that had the university in 1925, makes use of the transfer of space that gives the Secretariat of Public Education in the old wing of the House of Masks, where he shares the old classrooms, courtyards and gardens with a primary school, which takes possession of the place after the evacuation of the School Teachers. In 1926, the Summer School of the University was formally installed in masks. Soon after, in 1929, the University created the School of Music, which led him temporarily in the halls of the summer school. On 10 July the same year, the old Masks building was definitely built of university heritage. However it was in 1940, when a decree of expropriation of the President of the Republic, General Lazaro Cardenas, terminated the trial started in 1914, giving the final University ownership of the old building of the Masks, hosting various university institutions until 1959, when it was occupied by the Preparatoria 6.

=== Coyoacán ===
During the period of rector Dr. Ignacio Chávez Sánchez (1897–1979), the distinguished university began to take shape efforts to build a new building that would house the campus 6 of the National Preparatory School, as the beautiful, old building in San Cosme was insufficient to accommodate the large number of young people who started in their classrooms for college life. In those years, the organization had acquired a property owned by the Mier y Pesado Foundation, located in the beautiful village of Coyoacan, south of the city. Coyo-hua-can, "Place where coyotes abound" in the language of its ancient inhabitants, the Tepanecs have since had a prominent place in history and culture of Mexico. The Lord of Coyoacan, in the social and economic importance of the kingdom, was one of the high officials who accompanied Moctezuma to meet with the Spanish conqueror, and was the site of Coyoacan split the Mexican emperor, after preparing the final assault here of Tenochtitlan.

In this town, producer of fruits and vegetables, was established the vacation home of Hernán Cortés, where he imprisoned and tortured Cuauhtemoc, the last Aztec king. During colonial times, Coyoacán becomes the first political center of New Spain, to form here the Cabildo of Mexico City in 1521. Home to many historical events, arts and culture, Coyoacán is home since February 11, 1964, when it was inaugurated by the then President of the Republic, accompanied by the rector, Dr. Ignacio Chavez, and community of preparatoriana that since then, was to stand by his enthusiasm, his fraternal relations and high academic standards.

== Notable graduates ==
- Damián Alcázar, Mexican actor.
- Katia Itzel García, Mexican professional football referee.
- Miguel Herrera, Mexican football player and coach.
- Leonardo López Luján, Mexican archaeologist.
- Miguel Ángel Mancera, Mexican politician.
