= Santiago Millas =

- Municipality
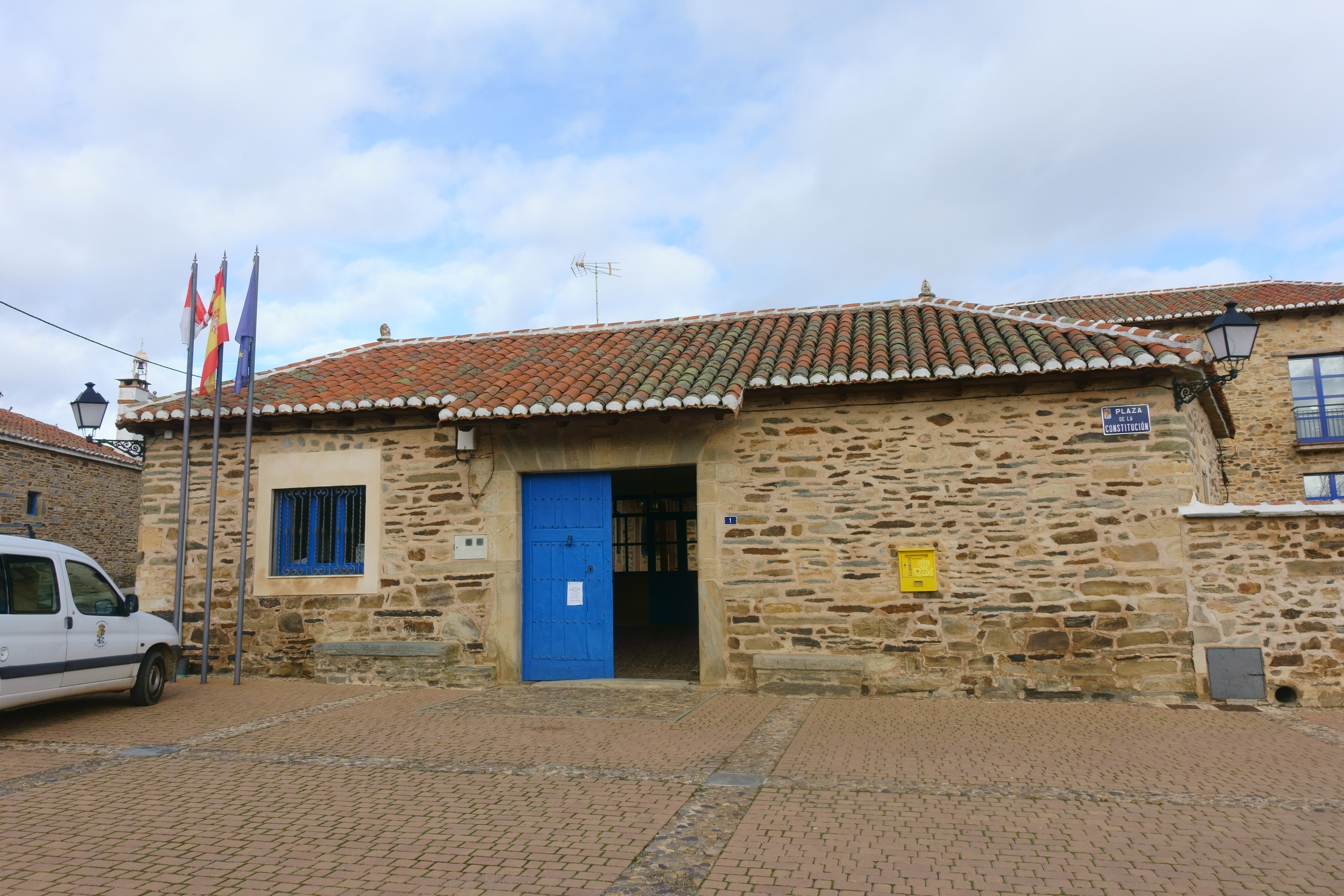
- Town hall

- Coat of arms

- Location within Spain
- Coordinates: 42°23′N 6°06′W
- Country: Spain
- Autonomous community: Castile and León
- Province: León
- Municipality: Santiago Millas

Area
  - Total: 39 km^{2} (15 sq mi)

Population (2025-01-01)
  - Total: 350
  - Density: 9.0/km^{2} (23/sq mi)
- Time zone: UTC+1 (CET)
  - Summer (DST): UTC+2 (CEST)
- Climate: Csb

Santiago Millas is a municipality located in La Maragatería, province of León, Castile and León, Spain. According to the 2004 census (INE), the municipality had a population of 335.

== Villages ==
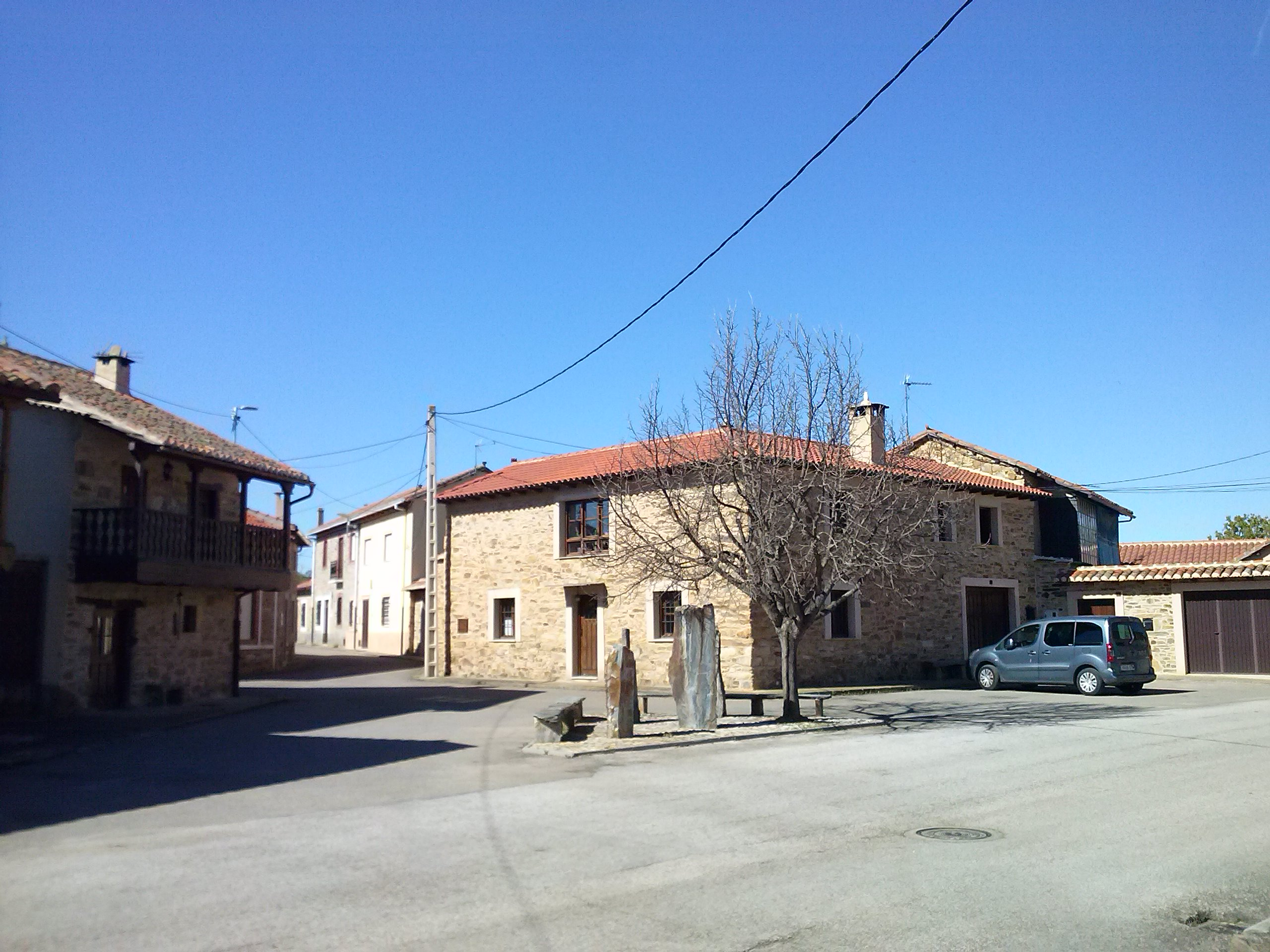
Morales del Arcediano

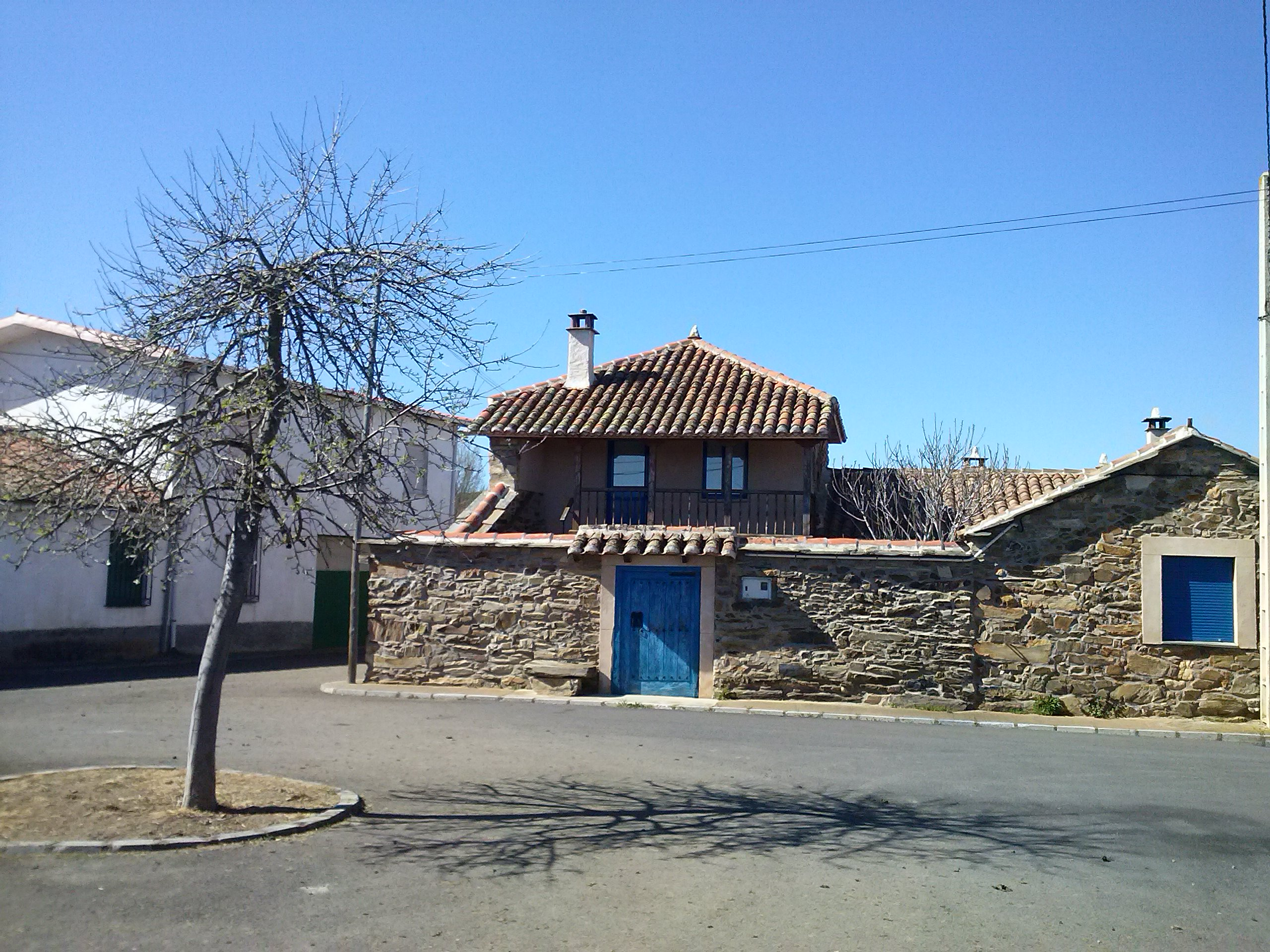
Oteruelo

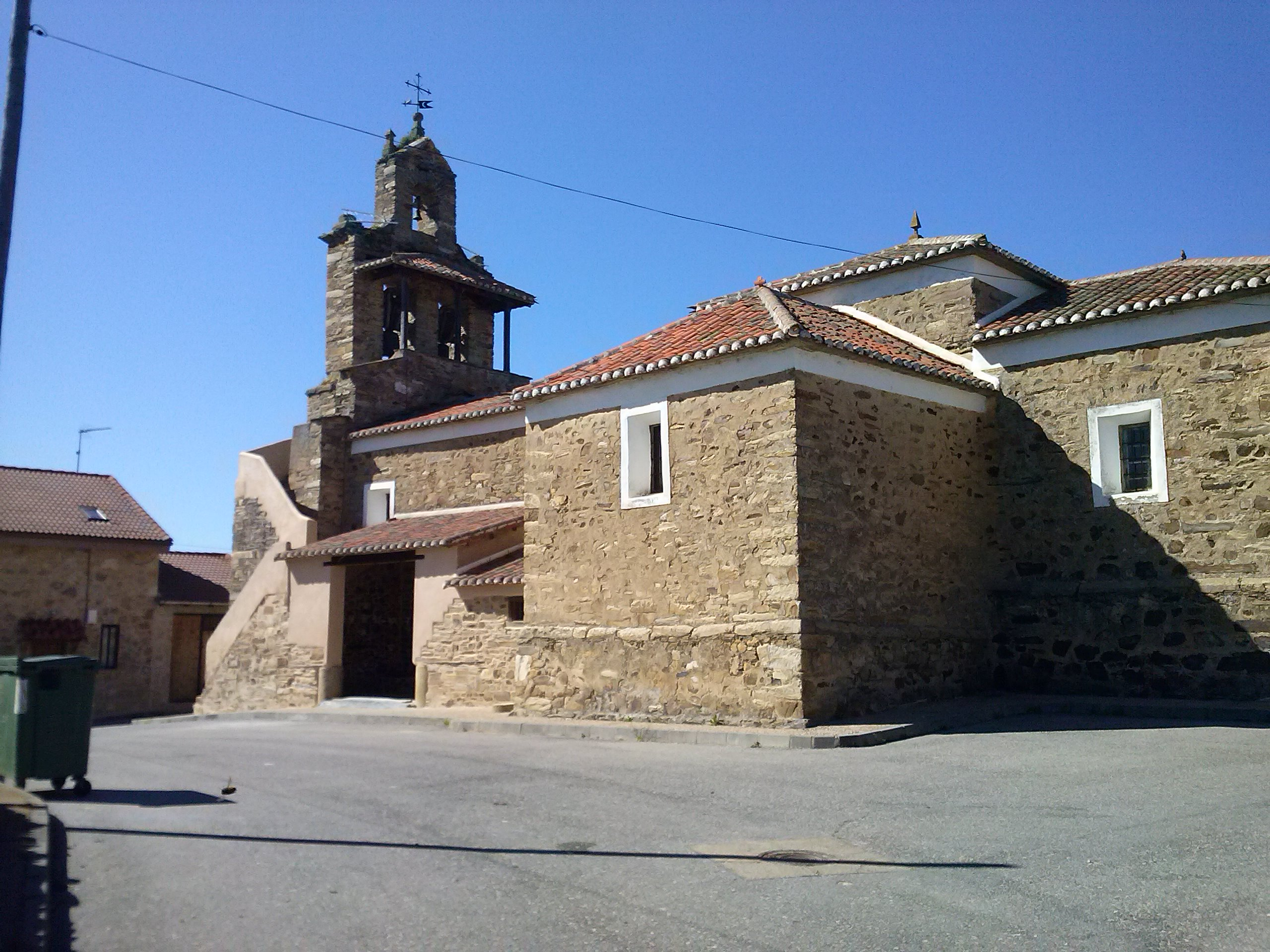
Piedralba

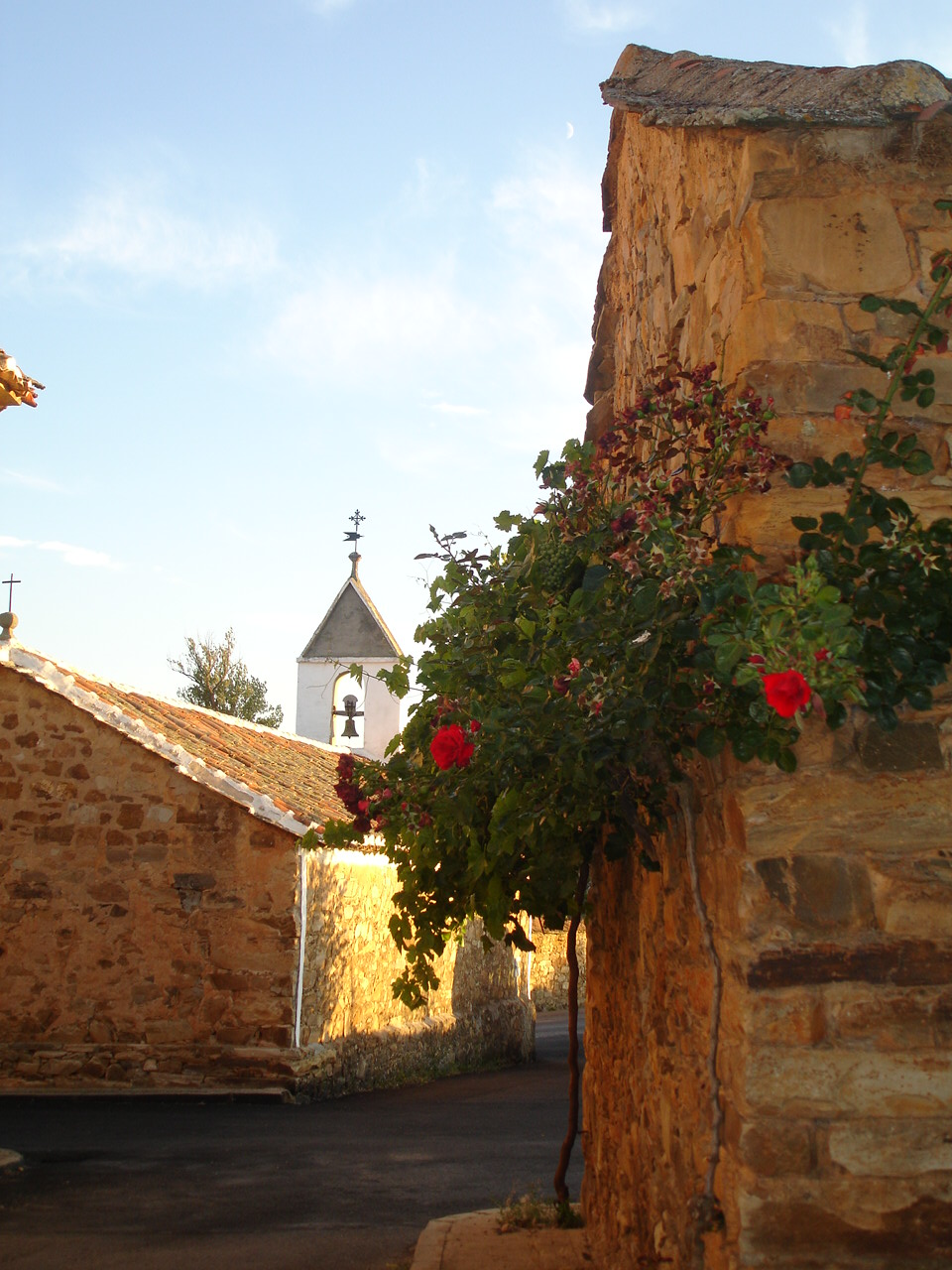
Valdespino de Somoza
- Barrio de Abajo
- Morales de Arcediano
- Oteruelo
- Piedralba
- Santiago Millas
- Valdespino de Somoza
