= Miguel Ángel Mancera =

Mexican politician

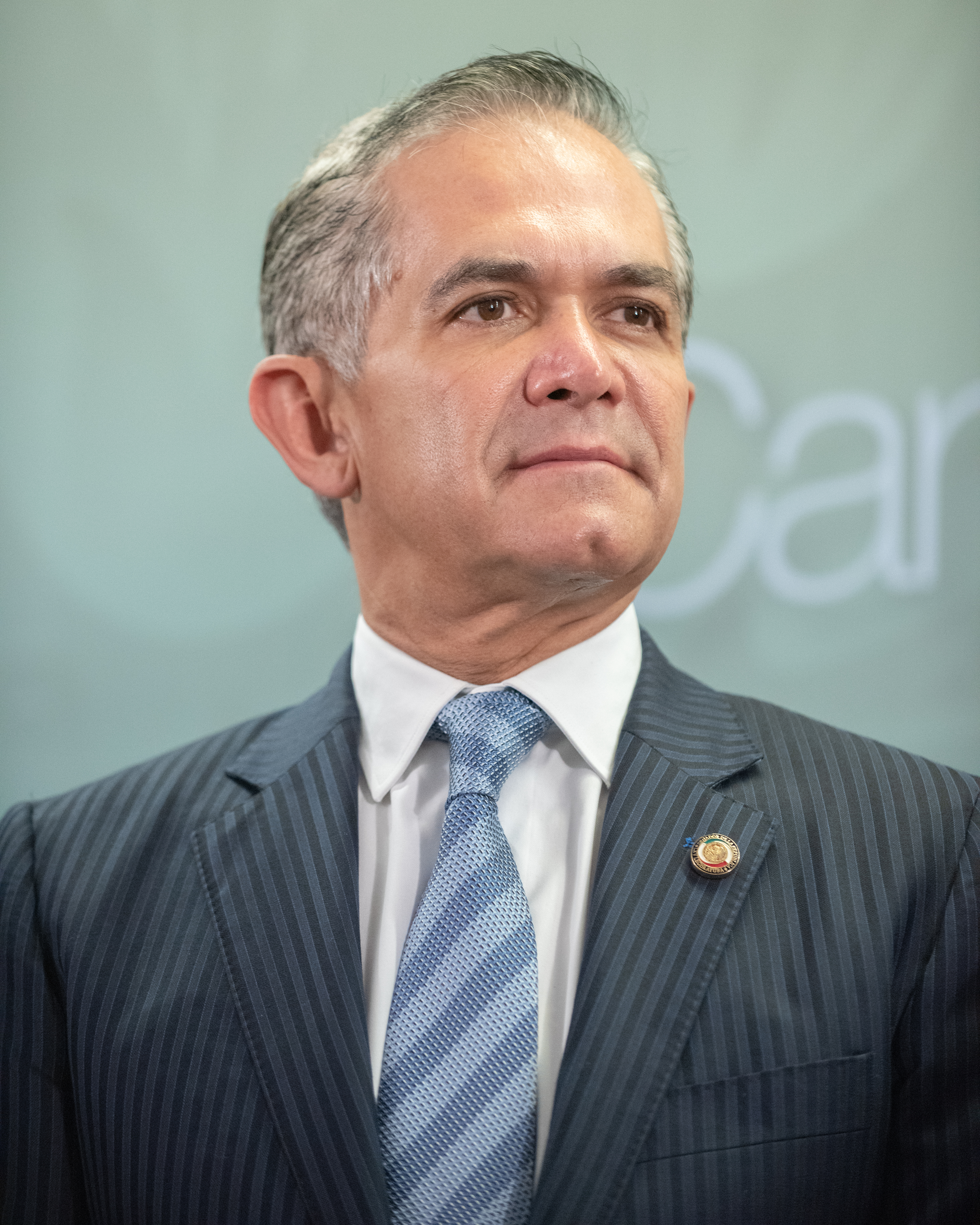
- Mancera in 2022

Senator of the Republic (proportional representation)
- In office 1 September 2018 – 31 August 2024

6th head of government of Mexico City
- In office 5 December 2012 – 29 March 2018
- Preceded by: Marcelo Ebrard
- Succeeded by: José Ramón Amieva (acting)

National Conference of Governors
- In office 3 May 2017 – 13 December 2017
- Preceded by: Graco Ramírez
- Succeeded by: Arturo Núñez Jiménez

Attorney General of Justice of Mexico City
- In office 8 July 2008 – 6 January 2012
- Governor: Marcelo Ebrard
- Preceded by: Rodolfo Félix Cárdenas
- Succeeded by: Jesús Rodríguez Almeida

Personal details
- Born: Miguel Ángel Mancera Espinosa; 16 January 1966 (age 60) Miguel Hidalgo, Mexico City, Mexico
- Party: Independent (Note: Although Mancera has worked in PRD-led administrations, he has never been a member of the party.)
- Children: 3
- Education: National Autonomous University of Mexico

Miguel Ángel Mancera Espinosa (Spanish: [miˌɣeˈlaŋxel manˈseɾa]; born 16 January 1966) is a Mexican lawyer and politician who has represented the Party of the Democratic Revolution (PRD). He served as the head of government of Mexico City from 2012 to 2018.

Mancera earned his law degree from the Faculty of Law at the National Autonomous University of Mexico (UNAM) in 1989 and received the Gabino Barreda Medal in 1991 for academic excellence. He holds a master's degree from both the University of Barcelona and the Metropolitan Autonomous University, as well as a Juris Doctor from UNAM. Mancera has taught at several universities, including the UNAM, the Autonomous Technological Institute of Mexico and the University of the Valley of Mexico.

In 2002, he began working in public service when Marcelo Ebrard, then Secretary of Public Security of Mexico City, invited him to serve as an adviser. In 2006, Mancera was appointed Assistant Attorney General, and from 2008 to 2012, he served as the city's Attorney General. In early 2012, Mancera was selected as the candidate for Head of Government of the Federal District by the Progressive Movement coalition, which included the PRD, the Labor Party, and the Citizens' Movement. In the election held on 1 July 2012, he won with over 66 percent of the vote.

He took office on 5 December 2012. During his mandate, Mancera faced the increase of the Mexico City Metro fare, the first closure of Metro Line 12 due to construction issues, the introduction of the city's constitution, the implementation of new driving regulations, and the 2017 Puebla earthquake. He resigned on 29 March 2018, to run for the Senate, leaving office with the lowest approval rating for a head of government. His administration was scrutinized by his successor, Claudia Sheinbaum, who prosecuted multiple crimes allegedly committed during his tenure. Ultimately, Mancera was sanctioned with a one-year disqualification from holding any public office in the city after promoting a presidential candidate while serving as head of government. He served as proportional-representation senator from 2018 to 2024.

== Early life and education ==
Miguel Ángel Mancera Espinosa was born on 16 January 1966, in the colonia (neighborhood) of Anáhuac, in the Miguel Hidalgo borough of the Federal District (later known as Mexico City). His father founded the restaurant chain Bisquets Obregón. Mancera has four half-siblings. When he was four, he lived in the colonia of Tacuba, where he attended kindergarten. He later studied at Miguel Alemán Primary School and Secondary School No. 45, both located in the Benito Juárez borough. For high school, he enrolled at Preparatoria 6, part of the National Autonomous University of Mexico (UNAM).

As a teenager, Mancera was involved in a car accident in which in which the vehicle he was riding in was hit by another. The public prosecutor's office asked him to sign a document absolving the driver of liability. Mancera refused and took the case to Victoria Adato Green, then-Attorney General of the Federal District. With the help of legal advisor Diego Ramudia, he succeeded in having the driver fined. The experience led him to change his career path from a science-related field to law. He studied at the Faculty of Law of the UNAM from 1985 to 1989.

His thesis, "La libertad por desvanecimiento de datos en el Proceso Penal y la Absolución de la Instancia" ("The progressive release of public data on criminal prosecutions and acquittals") earned him the Diario de México Medal "Los Mejores Estudiantes de México" in November 1990. A year later, in November 1991, he received the Gabino Barreda Medal from the UNAM Faculty of Law for graduating at the top of his 1989 class. Mancera went on to earn a master's degree from both the University of Barcelona and the Metropolitan Autonomous University, Azcapotzalco campus, and later obtained a Juris Doctor from UNAM, with honors. His doctoral thesis was titled "El injusto en la tentativa y la graduación de su pena en el derecho penal mexicano" ("Injustice and disparity in Mexican criminal sentencing"). He also pursued specialized studies in criminal law at the University of Salamanca and the University of Castile-La Mancha, Spain, under the auspices of the Panamerican University, Mexico.

== Early political career ==
Mancera has worked as a candidate attorney, lawyer, and adviser at several law firms, including García Cordero y Asociados and Grupo de Abogados Consultores. He has also been a professor at various Mexican universities, including the UNAM, the Autonomous Technological Institute of Mexico, the University of the Valley of Mexico, the Panamerican University, the Autonomous University of Aguascalientes, and the Autonomous University of Baja California.

Around 2002, he began working in government when Marcelo Ebrard, then Secretary of Public Security of Mexico City, invited him to serve as an adviser. When Ebrard was later appointed Secretary of Social Development by the head of government Andrés Manuel López Obrador, Mancera was named Legal Director of the Social Development Secretariat. In 2006, he was appointed Assistant Attorney General of Mexico City.

Mancera was appointed Attorney General of Mexico City on 8 July 2008, following the dismissal of Rodolfo Félix Cárdenas due to the New's Divine nightclub tragedy, in which nine teenagers and three police officers died during a failed police operation. According to official reports, crime in Mexico City decreased by 12 percent from 2010 to 2011, while the national crime rate rose by 10.4 percent. During this period, 179 street gangs comprising 706 members were dismantled, and kidnappings dropped by 61 percent.

== Head of government of Mexico City ==
=== 2012 elections ===
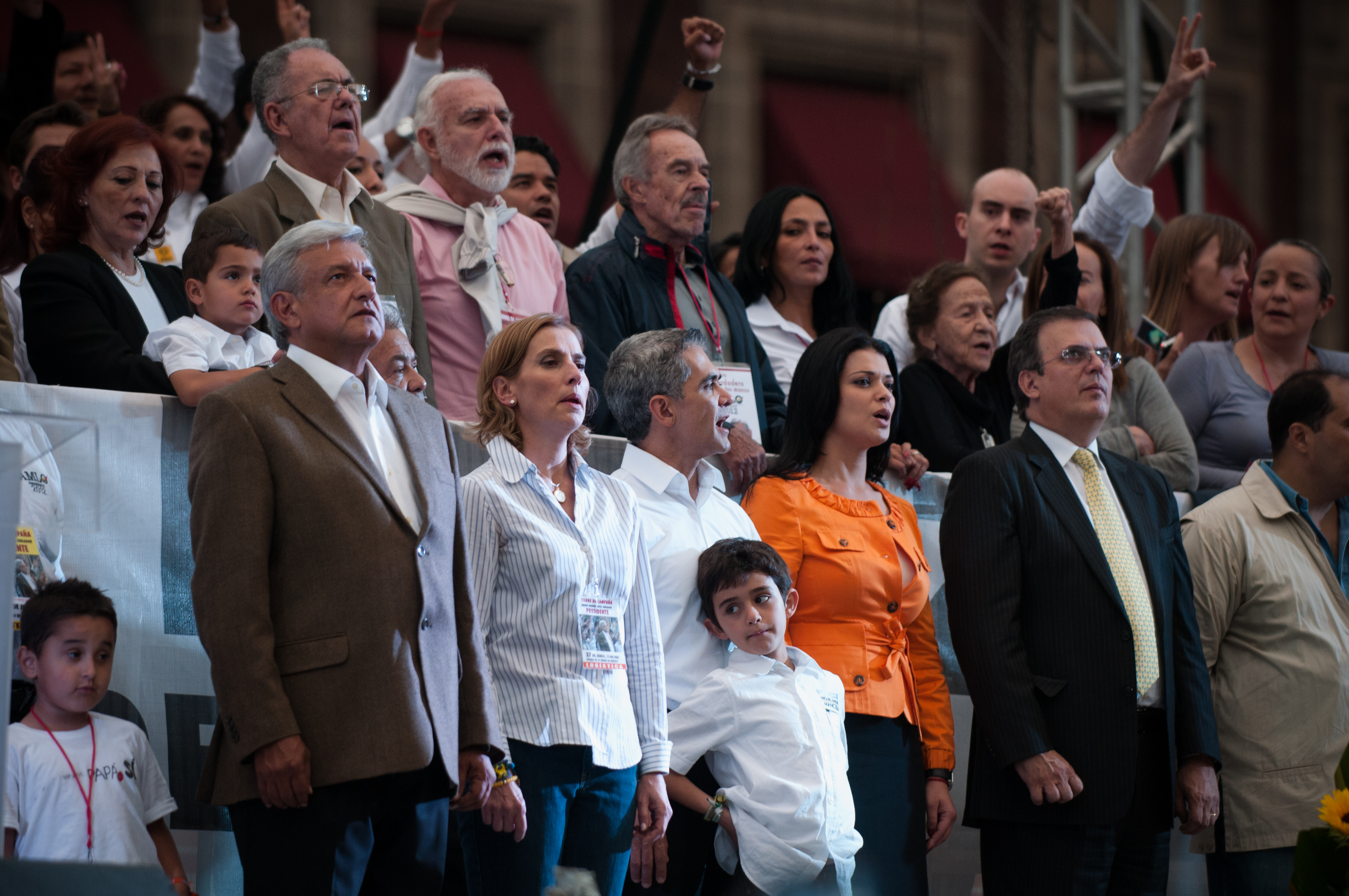
Mancera (center) with López Obrador (far left), Ebrard (far right), and others at a López Obrador presidential campaign event, held on 27 June 2012 in the Zócalo, Mexico City.

On 6 January 2012, Mancera resigned as Attorney General to run for Head of Government in the 1 July 2012 election. Jesús Rodríguez Almeida succeeded him in the role. Two days later, on 8 January, Mancera registered as a Party of the Democratic Revolution (PRD) precandidate for head of government of Mexico City. On 19 January, he was named the official candidate, representing the leftist Progressive Movement coalition, which also included the Labor Party, and the Citizen's Movement. He ran against Alejandra Barrales, Gerardo Fernández Noroña, Martí Batres, and Joel Ortega Cuevas.

Mancera's opponents were Beatriz Paredes Rangel, representing the Institutional Revolutionary Party–Ecologist Green Party of Mexico coalition Commitment to Mexico; Isabel Miranda de Wallace, for the National Action Party (PAN); and Rosario Guerra for the New Alliance Party. Late-January polls showed Mancera leading Paredes by 18 to 30 points, though his support dropped nine points the following month. According to El Universal, his favorability rose from 36 percent in March to 41 percent in April, and to 57.5 percent in May. That same month, Adolfo Hellmund, Luis Mandoki, and Costa Bonino allegedly borrowed six million dollars on behalf of Mancera and López Obrador at the home of Luis Creel. Both politicians denied involvement, and Mancera filed a complaint with the Attorney General of Mexico City for unauthorized use of his name.

As candidate, the proposals of Mancera included continuing Ebrard's policies, increasing the number of security cameras from 13,000 to 20,000, reducing car travel times, expanding Mexico City Metro Line 12, addressing solid waste management, removing minibuses from circulation, building 18 water purification plants, implementing a Green Plan, and replacing garbage trucks to enable the separation of organic and inorganic waste, among other initiatives. On 1 July 2012, exit polls indicated Mancera as the likely winner of the election, with an estimated vote share of 59.5–64.5 percent, placing him roughly 40 percentage points ahead of the second-place candidate, Paredes. On 7 July, the Federal District Electoral Institute (IEDF) declared Mancera the Head of Government-elect and issued him a certificate of majority after he secured 3,031,156 votes (66.56 percent of the total) in a landslide victory, which he received on 8 October 2012.

=== First year ===
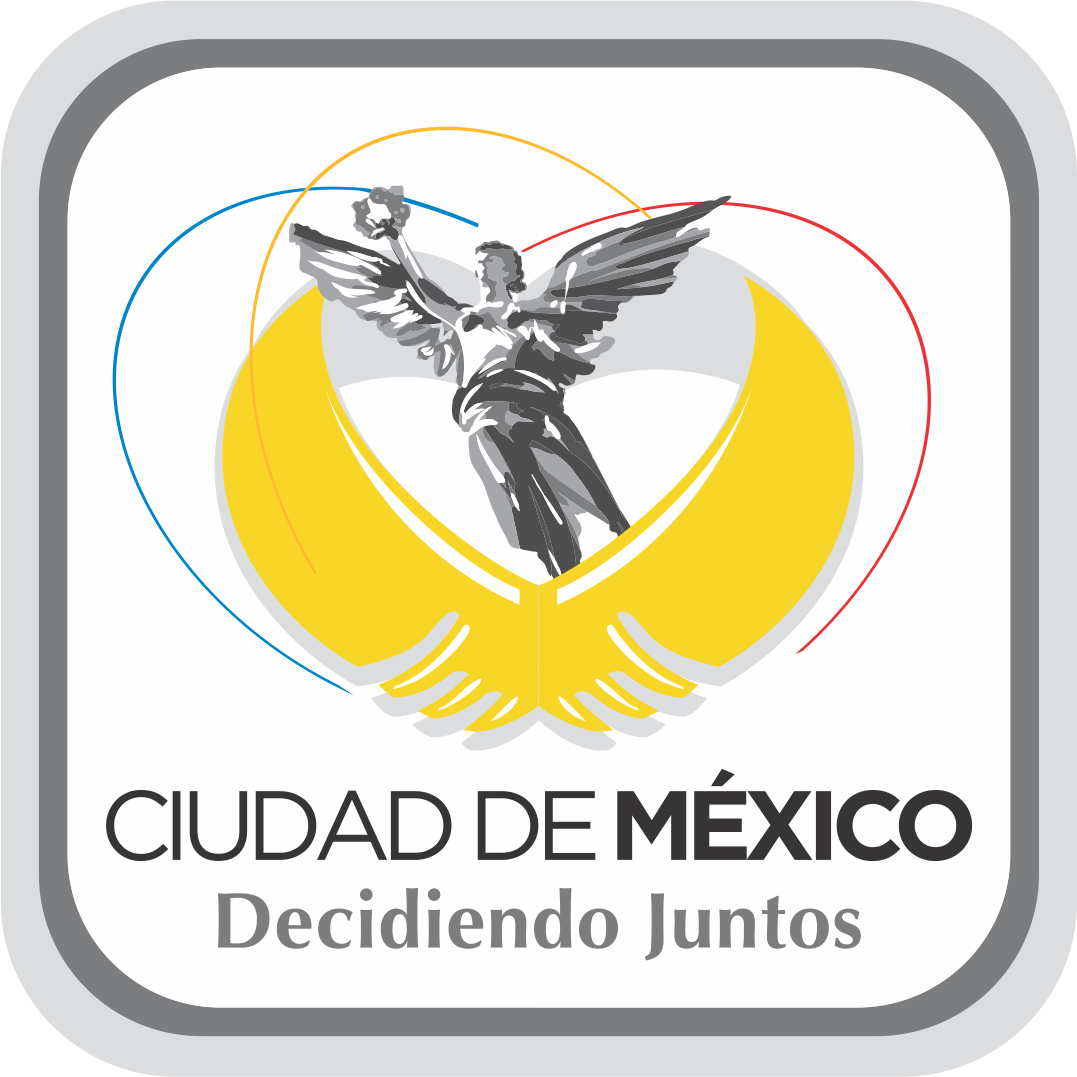
Mexico City mayoralty logo during Mancera’s administration, with the slogan "Decidiendo Juntos" ("Choosing Together")

Mancera assumed office on 5 December 2012, as the sixth head of government of the Federal District. On 24 December of the same year, he launched a voluntary disarmament campaign in the borough of Iztapalapa. In exchange for turning in firearms and grenades, participants received money, tablet computers, or home appliances. The program was later implemented across all Mexico City boroughs in the following years. City Mayors Foundation named Mancera the mayor of June 2013. In November 2013, Mancera opened Line 5 of the Mexico City Metrobús running along northeastern Mexico City from Río de los Remedios to San Lázaro metro station.

In the same month, Mancera announced the increase of the Mexico City Metro fare, raising the price from three to five pesos per ride. According to the Metro operator, Sistema Transporte Colectivo, the additional revenue would be used to improve infrastructure and maintain the system's twelve lines and its stations. The fare increase drew criticism from parts of the city's population, who viewed it as a strain on household finances, especially given that the minimum wage in Mexico City was 64.76 pesos as of January 2013. In response, Mancera stated that three polling companies would conduct surveys with 7,200 Metro riders between 29 November and 2 December to gather public opinion—the sample represented less than one percent of the system's 5.5 million daily users. According to polling company results, over 50 percent of respondents supported the fare increase. The new fare was approved to take effect on 13 December. Due to this, through the short-lived Movimiento Pos Me Salto, users called to civil disobedience protests by jumping over the turnstiles. However, Mexico City Government announced they would take legal actions against those who skip them.

=== Second year ===
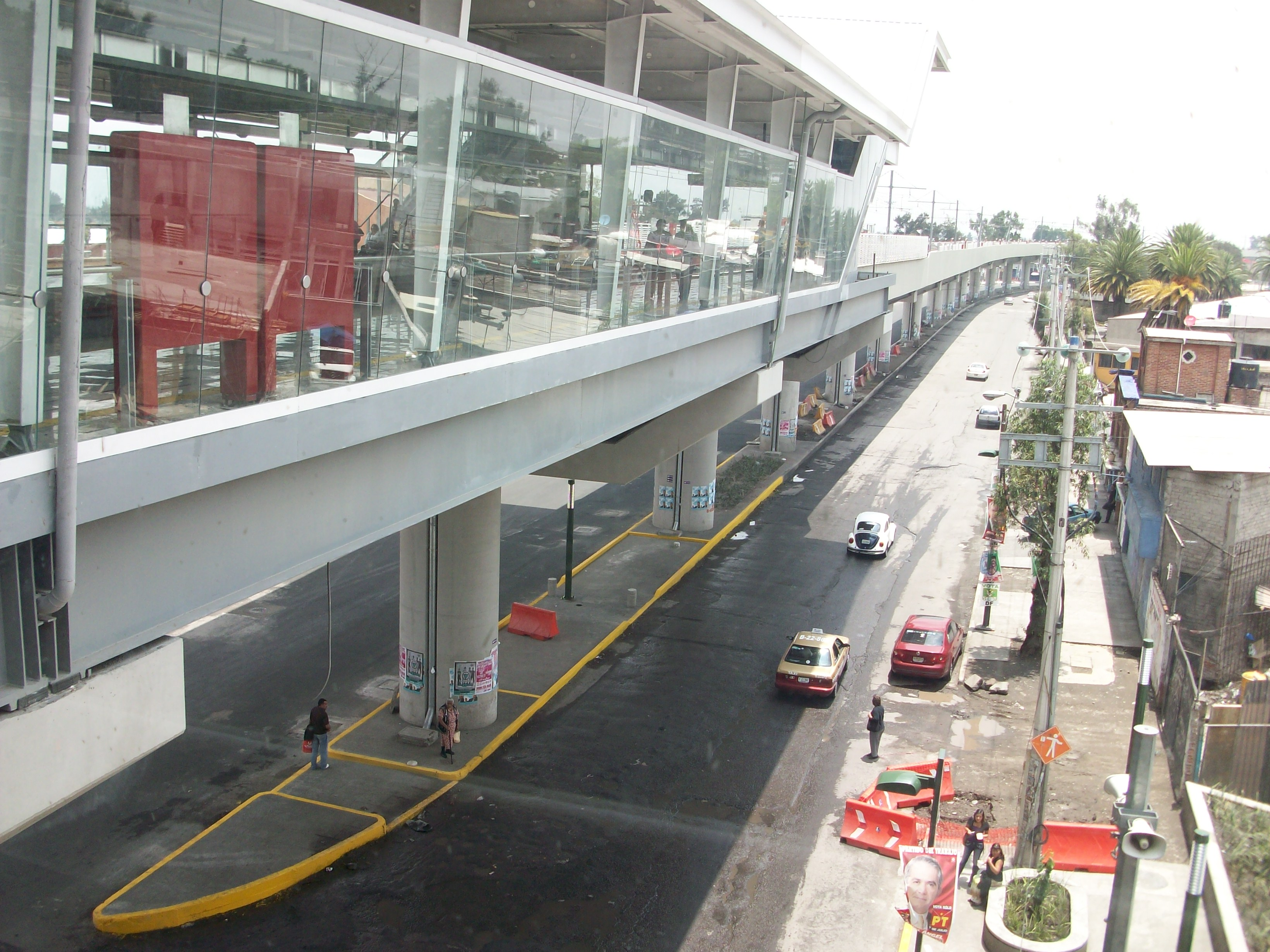
Several elevated metro stations on Line 12 (Olivos metro station pictured) were closed for twenty months due to safety concerns.

On 11 March 2014, Mancera's administration closed twelve metro stations on Line 12 of the Metro due to construction-related issues. Metro authorities stated the shutdown would last at least six months, or until "the necessary studies, corrections, and maintenance are carried out to ensure user safety". The line had been inaugurated just a few months earlier, on 30 October 2012, by Ebrard. Twelve curves suffered significant damage in their tracks, and there was wear on the rails due to incompatibility with the FE-10 model trains. ICA, Grupo Carso and Alstom, the consortium that built the line, denied any wrongdoing. Bernardo Quintana, president of ICA, described the closure as "arbitrary" and stated that proper maintenance and measures to address the incompatibilities were necessary for the line to function correctly. In addition, the Superior Auditor of the Federation detected a diversion of 7.5 billion pesos from the Secretariat of Communications and Transportation during the construction of the line. Thirty-three officials and former officials, including Enrique Horcasitas, the director of the Line 12 project, were sanctioned with disqualifications from public service, fines, or both, due to project failures and cost overruns. The relationship between Mancera and Ebrard became strained amid efforts to investigate Ebrard for possible corruption, which he described as a smear campaign.

The administration introduced a basic driving test for all new driver's license applicants. Previously, individuals only needed to present identification, proof of residence, and pay a fee, without having to demonstrate any driving knowledge or skill. The environmental program Hoy No Circula, which restricts certain vehicles from circulating in the city one day a week based on their license plate number, was expanded to two days per week over the course of the year.

=== Third year ===
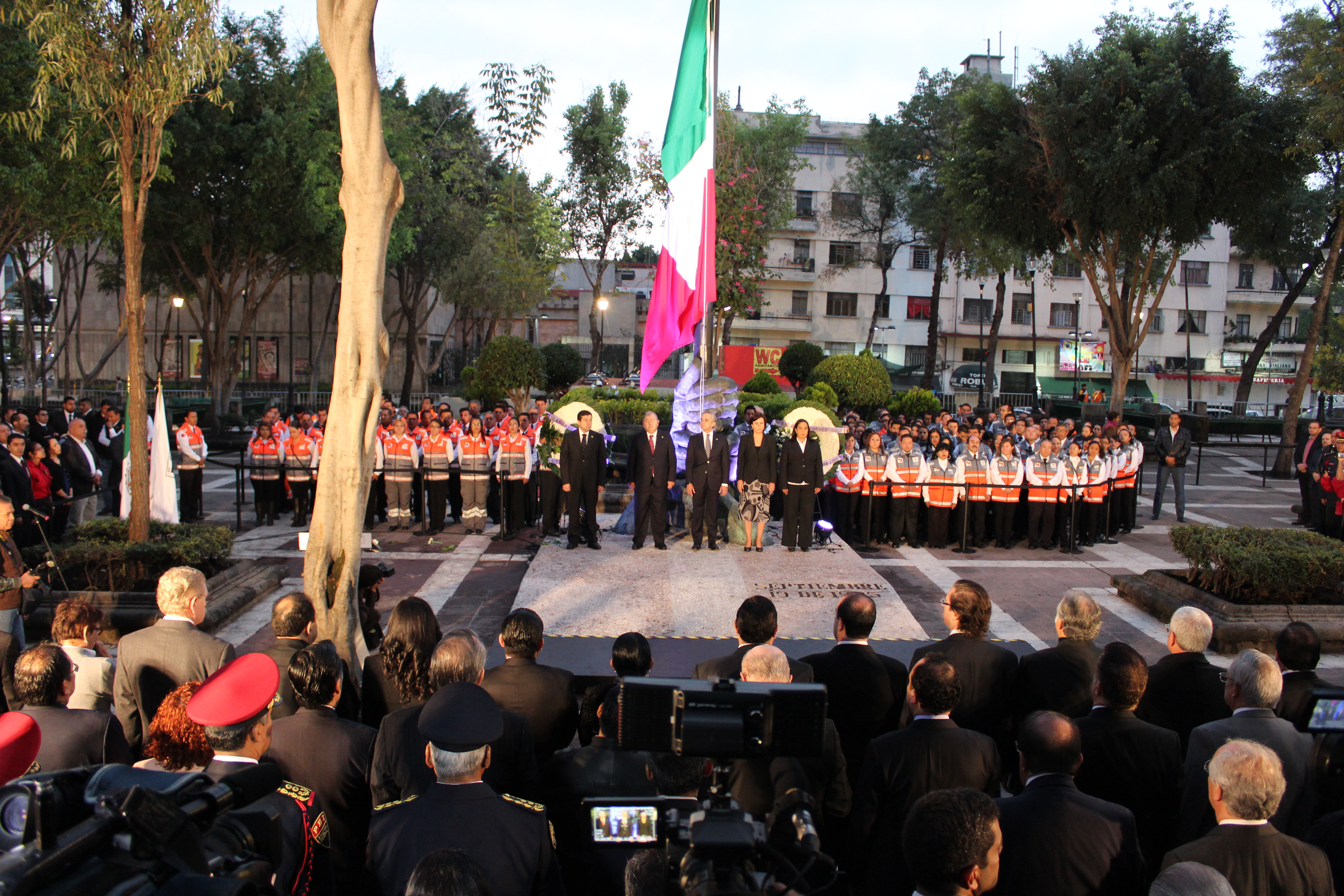
Mancera during the commemorative ceremony for the 30th anniversary of the 1985 Mexico City earthquake in Plaza de la Solidaridad

Mexico City's taxis had their traditional green color replaced with a white-and-Mexican-pink color scheme. In May 2015, Mancera signed a law granting universal access to individuals accompanied by assistance dogs. In July, Mancera reshuffled his cabinet, reassigning several secretaries to different positions.

In the same month, Mancera's administration announced a major urban development project: the Corredor Cultural Creativo Chapultepec-Zona Rosa (Creative Cultural Corridor, or CCC), aimed at revitalizing Chapultepec Avenue, a thoroughfare connecting Chapultepec Park to the Zona Rosa neighborhood. Mexican architect Fernando Romero was appointed to lead the design team, alongside architects Juan Pablo Maza and Ruysdael Vivanco. The plan included preserving the avenue's trees and the Chapultepec aqueduct, while prioritizing pedestrian and cyclist access. The project later received the International Architecture Award in the Urban Planning category.

On 19 September, Mancera commemorated the 30th anniversary of the 1985 earthquake with a tribute that included a concert by Plácido Domingo, who had lost four relatives in a building collapse in Tlatelolco. On 29 November, the government reopened all the Line 12 stations that had been closed in 2014. In December, following a public consultation with residents of Cuauhtémoc, the borough where Chapultepec is located, 63 percent voted against the CCC project, leading to its official cancellation.

=== Fourth year ===
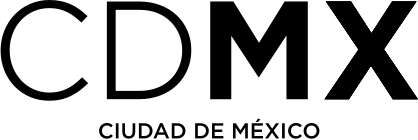
During his fourth year, Mexico City officially adopted the name Ciudad de México, usually abbreviated as "CDMX".

Mancera inaugurated Line 6 of the Mexico City Metrobús on 21 January 2016, serving northern Mexico City from El Rosario metro station to Villa de Aragón metro station. That same month, on 29 January, following a political reform, Mexico City, then officially known as the Federal District, was renamed Ciudad de México (City of Mexico), and commonly abbreviated as CDMX. According to a March poll by El Universal, Mancera's approval rating had dropped to 24 percent and 57 percent of disapproval. Survey respondents identified insecurity, corruption, unemployment, and poverty as the most pressing issues.

Mancera announced that for the first time since 2004, a Major League Baseball game would be held in Mexico City, as the Houston Astros and San Diego Padres played two exhibition games at Alfredo Harp Helú Stadium on 26 and 27 March. In April, construction began on the westbound expansion of Line 12. The project included plans to build two additional stations and to extend the line's terminal at Observatorio metro station. In July, the city distributed plastic whistles as a means of defense against sexual harassment targeting women, a measure that was criticized as ineffective. In August, the city's public markets were designated intangible cultural heritage as a way to ensure their preservation.

=== Fifth year ===
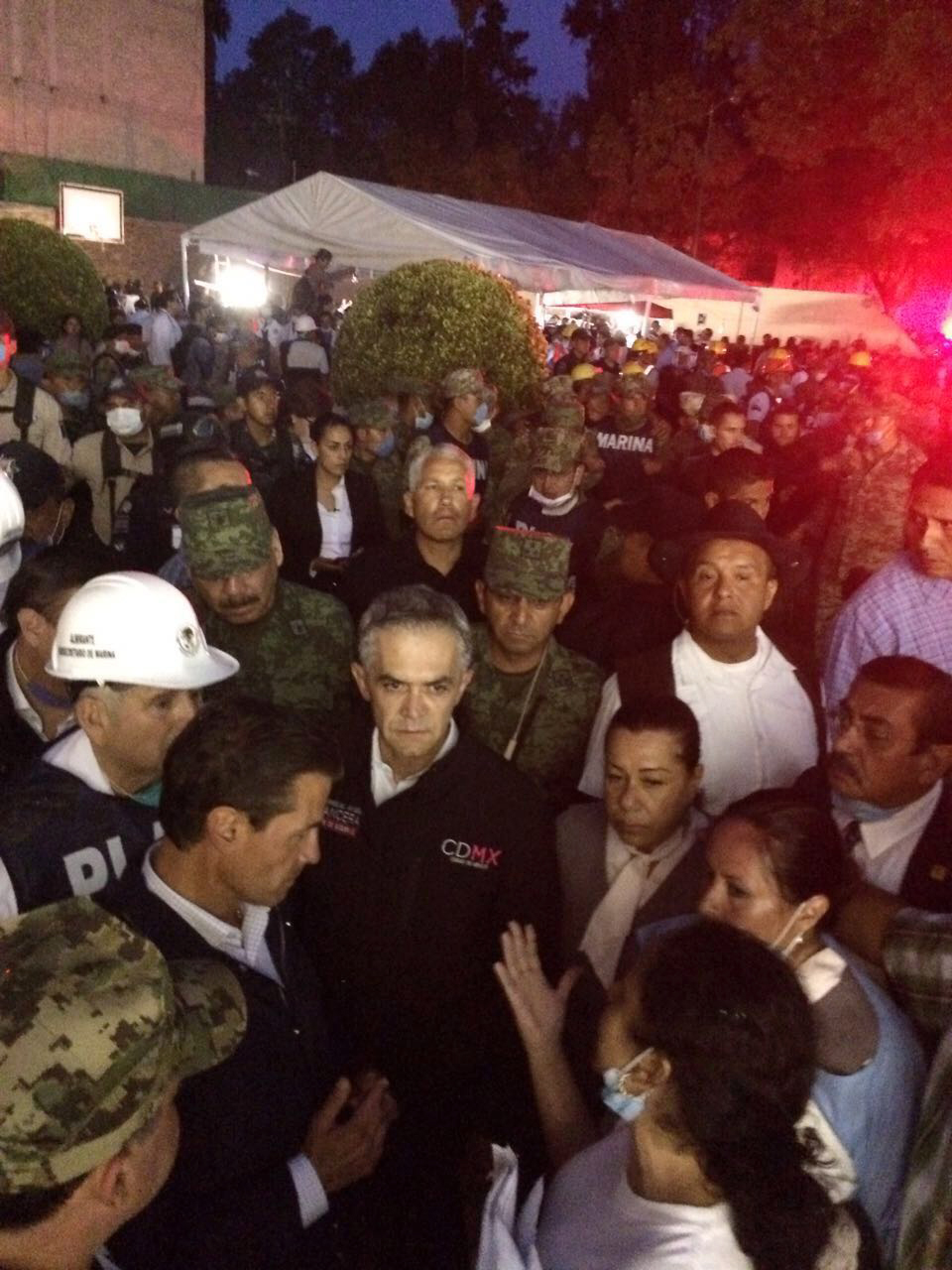
Mancera with President Enrique Peña Nieto (bottom left corner) during rescue coordination efforts on 19 September 2017.

The city's constitution was enacted on 5 February 2017, and was set to take effect on 17 September 2018. Mancera served as president of the National Conference of Governors from 3 May to 13 December 2017. On 19 September 2017, a 7.1 M_{w} earthquake hit Mexico City at 13:14 CDT (18:14 UTC). He led the annual national drill commemorating the 1985 earthquake, held two hours earlier. In the city, over 220 people died, at least 44 buildings collapsed, and over 3,000 others were evicted. There were nearly 6,000 complaints regarding construction violations since 2012. In 2016, Mancera had halted the law that allowed city departments to penalize Directors Responsible for Construction, the officials in charge of overseeing earthquake resilience. Critics like Josefina MacGregor from the association Suma Urbana, saw it as a way to prioritize urban development over safety. Mancera stated that new regulations were not a factor in the collapse, as many buildings had been constructed before 1985 and were not required to meet the updated standards. However, pre-1985 buildings with newer additions were required to comply with these regulations.

=== Sixth year ===
Line 7 of the Metrobús system opened on 5 March 2018, running along Paseo de la Reforma. On 29 March of that year, Mancera left the post of city head after requesting leave to run as a proportional-representation Senate candidate for the PAN in the July elections. José Ramón Amieva succeeded him as interim head of government. Mancera left office with the lowest approval rating in 20 years, facing criticism over rising insecurity and affected by internal conflicts within the PRD.

=== Investigations of Miguel Ángel Mancera's administration ===
When Claudia Sheinbaum took office as Mancera's successor as head of government of Mexico City, the city's Attorney General's Office launched several investigations. These focused on prosecuting various crimes and administrative offenses allegedly committed during Mancera's administration, including actions involving some of his close collaborators. In 2020, 1,680 public servants were sanctioned by Mexico City Comptroller Office. On 5 October 2020, the Electoral Tribunal of the Federal Judiciary sanctioned Mancera with a one-year disqualification to any public role in Mexico City after determining that he promoted a presidential candidate, Ricardo Anaya, in 2018, while being head of government, and sanctioned by Mexican electoral laws.

== Senator of the Republic ==
Mancera was elected as a senator and led the PRD's legislative caucus, despite having been elected through the PAN party. On 6 March 2024, he was elected president of the Tourism Commission of the Senate.

== Personal life ==
Mancera has been married twice. His first marriage was to a woman named Martha in the early 1990s, with whom he lived in civil union for one year. They divorced two years later. Six years later, Mancera married Magnolia, with whom he had two children. After about a decade, he divorced Magnolia. Mancera also has a daughter out of wedlock, but he has said the child's mother does not want him to have contact with her. From 2008 to 2009, Mancera dated Alejandra Barrales, who was then president of the PRD party, and who sought to become the PRD candidate for Mayor of Mexico City in 2012. In September 2007, two assailants on a motorcycle intercepted and attempted to rob Mancera while he was driving his BMW on Periférico Sur. His bodyguard intervened and shot one of the robbers, killing him.

In his spare time, he practices various sports, including Krav Maga, indoor cycling, strength training, hunting and aviation. On 31 October 2014, he underwent cardiac surgery after a cardiac arrhythmia was detected three months earlier. During the surgery, he experienced a cardiac perforation. He recovered two weeks later.

After his term as a senator ended, Mancera began a second doctorate, this time in public administration. He also practiced jujutsu, and launched a podcast titled Entre Amigos.

=== Awards ===
In 2008, Mancera received the Alfonso Caso Award from the UNAM Faculty of Law, recognizing him as the most distinguished graduate of the doctoral program. In September 2011, he was awarded the Latin American Prize for Life and Security of Women and Girls in Latin America and the Caribbean. In February 2012, UNAM's Faculty of Law awarded Mancera the Raúl Carrancá y Trujillo Medal for his "academic and professional trajectory".

== Bibliography ==
- La Tentativa en el Código Penal para el Distrito Federal, una Nueva Propuesta (2003)
- La Comisión por Omisión en el Nuevo Código Penal para el Distrito Federal (2003)
- López Obrador Caso el Encino. Implicaciones Constitucionales, Penales y de Procedimiento Penal (2005)
- Caso el Encino ¿Delito? (2005)
- Nuevo Código para el Distrito Federal Comentado, Tomo III (2006)
- Estudios Jurídicos en Homenaje a Olga Islas de González Mariscal, Tomo II (2007)
- Estudios Jurídicos en Homenaje al Dr. Ricardo Franco Guzmán (2008)
- Derecho Penal, Especialidad y Orgullo Universitario Papel del Abogado (2011)
- Derecho Penal del enemigo (2011)
- El Tipo de la Tentativa: Teoría y Práctica (2012)

== See also ==
- Ministry of Public Security (Mexico City)
