= Sardón de Duero =

Coordinates: 41°36′N 4°26′W

Sardón de Duero, Spain
- Coat of arms
- Interactive map of Sardón de Duero, Spain
- Country: Spain
- Autonomous community: Castile and León
- Province: Valladolid
- Municipality: Sardón de Duero

Area
  - Total: 19 km^{2} (7.3 sq mi)

Population (2025-01-01)
  - Total: 600
  - Density: 32/km^{2} (82/sq mi)
- Time zone: UTC+1 (CET)
  - Summer (DST): UTC+2 (CEST)

Sardón de Duero is a municipality in the province of Valladolid, Castile and León, Spain. According to the 2004 census (INE), the municipality has a population of 668 inhabitants. There is a factory producing mantecadas in Sardón de Duero, as well as the Monastery of Santa María de Retuerta.
