= Movimiento Pos Me Salto =

Mexico City protest campaign against public transit fare increases

The Pos Me Salto Movement was a protest campaign that took place in the Mexico City metro system in response to a 40% fare increase (from three to five pesos per ticket) on 13 December 2013, which abruptly made the transit system one of the world's most expensive. It was launched on Twitter by means of the #PosMeSalto hashtag (pos me salto means roughly "well, then, I'll jump [the turnstile]" in Spanish).

This protest encouraged not paying the fare and instead hopping over the metro turnstiles and avoiding the station police. During the first day of the protests, the police did not intervene and detained nobody.

== Precedents ==
The newspaper El Universal noted a precedent to this initiative in the movement that began in Brazil called Movimento Passe Livre and suggested that a number of consultants from that movement had traveled to Mexico City to assist their Mexican counterparts. People associated with the CNTE teachers' union and the National Autonomous University of Mexico also were said to be involved at the start of the movement, which the newspaper said was part of an international antiglobalization tendency.

== Reactions ==
In the days after the protest began, so did arrests, mostly on lines 1, 2, 3, and 8 where more riders were jumping the turnstiles: 64 people were detained.

Meanwhile, protesters posted photos of fare-dodging metro users on social media and this became something of a meme trend. Advice on how to dodge fares was also posted, along with the helpful information that fare-dodging is not a criminal but a civil offense, but that protesters should be careful not to risk being brought in on other criminal charges (vandalism, public drunkenness, weapons possession, obstructing the metro).

As time passed, the number of riders jumping the turnstiles decreased. However it was not until April, 2014 that the then-head of government, Miguel Ángel Mancera, put forward an initiative in the legislative assembly that would impose fines or arrests against people who enter the metro without paying. This in spite of the fact that Mancera had previously promised to respect the protest against the fare increase: "Several organizations have expressed their interest in jumping the turnstiles with the hope of seeing an adjustment in the fare; we are going to act with tolerance. We simply want to ask that the facilities not be disturbed and that the video surveillance systems and turnstiles not be damaged," he had said on the day before the fare increases went into effect.
