= Morales del Arcediano =

- Minor local entity
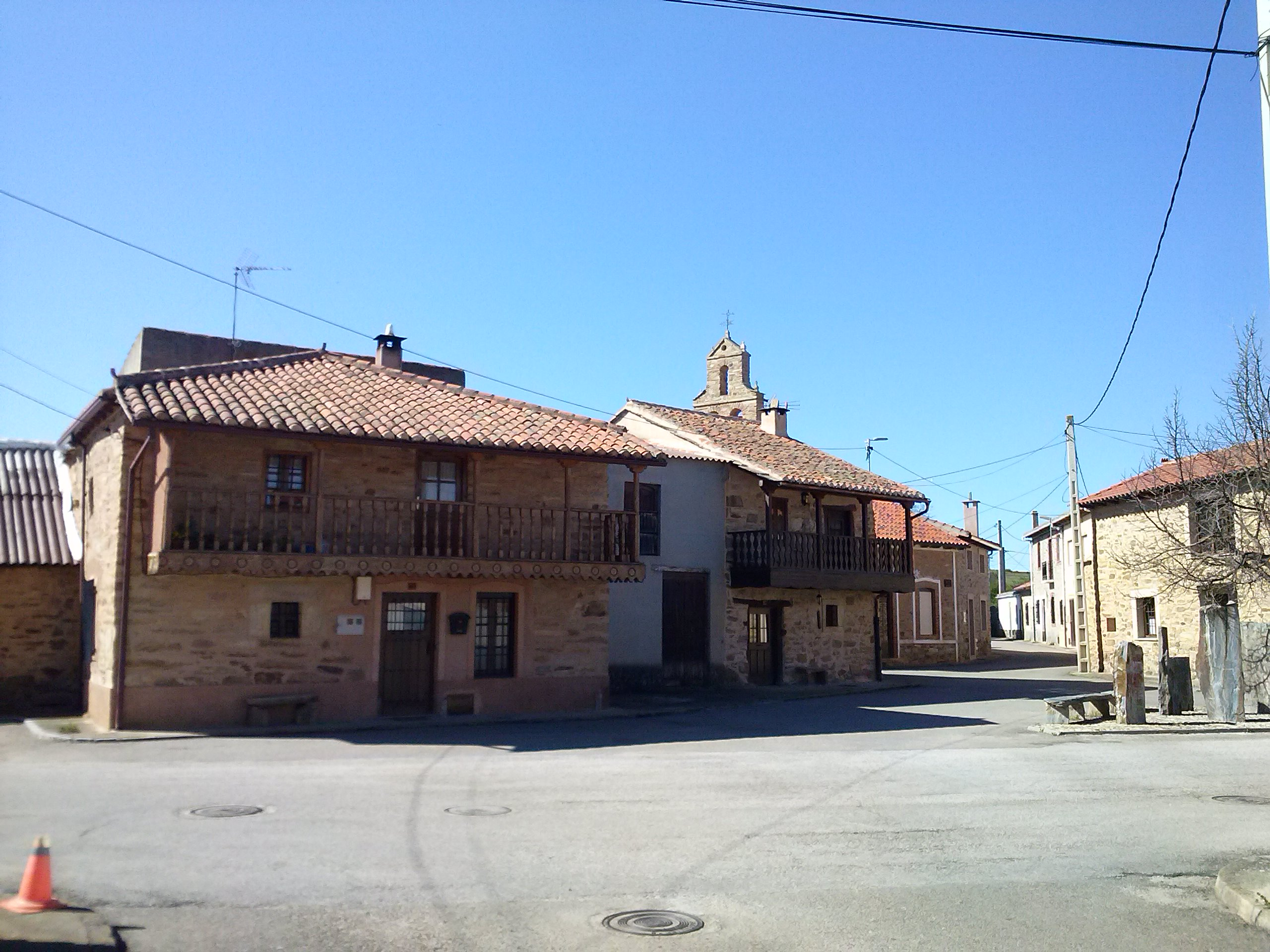

- Location within Province of León Location within Castile and León Location within Spain
- Coordinates: 42°25′14″N 6°5′52″W
- Country: Spain
- Autonomous community: Castile and León
- Province: Province of León
- Municipality: Santiago Millas
- Elevation: 863 m (2,831 ft)

Population
  - Total: 51

Morales del Arcediano is a locality and minor local entity located in the municipality of Santiago Millas, in León province, Castile and León, Spain. As of 2020, it has a population of 51.

== Geography ==
Morales del Arcediano is located 54km west-southwest of León, Spain.
