= Val de San Lorenzo =

Coordinates: 42°25′N 6°07′W

- municipality
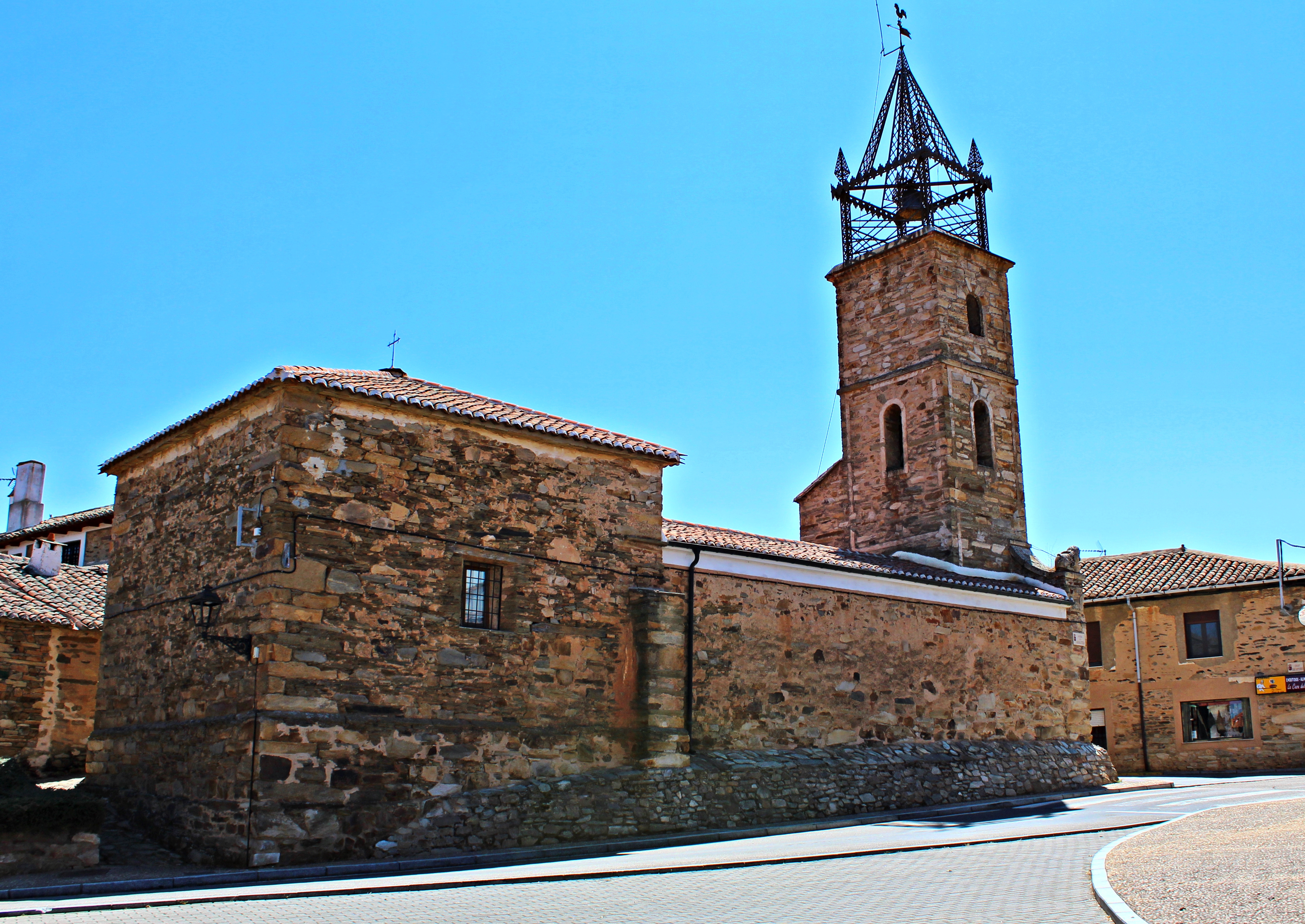
- Hermitage of San Antonio in Val de San Lorenzo

- Flag Coat of arms
- Interactive map of Val de San Lorenzo
- Country: Spain
- Autonomous community: Castile and León
- Province: León
- Municipality: Val de San Lorenzo

Area
  - Total: 49 km^{2} (19 sq mi)

Population (2025-01-01)
  - Total: 480
  - Density: 9.8/km^{2} (25/sq mi)
- Time zone: UTC+1 (CET)
  - Summer (DST): UTC+2 (CEST)
- Climate: Csb

Val de San Lorenzo is a municipality located in the province of León, Castile and León, Spain. According to the 2004 census (INE), the municipality has a population of 674 inhabitants and a density of 12,89 inhabitants/km^{2}.
