= Brazuelo =

Brazuelo Brazuelu
- municipality
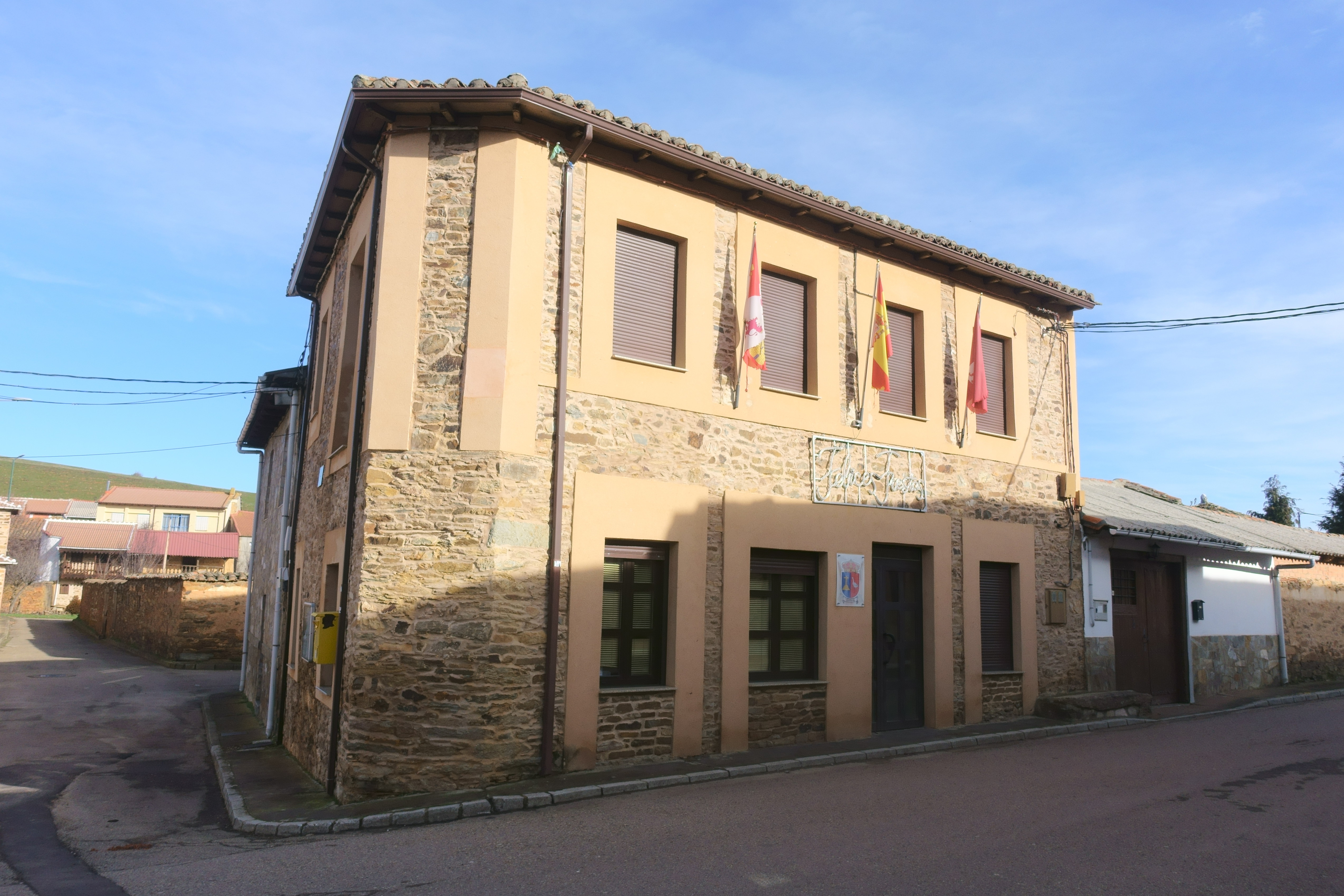
- Town hall

- Coat of arms

- Location within Spain
- Coordinates: 42°29′50″N 6°9′25″W
- Country: Spain
- Autonomous community: Castile and León
- Province: León
- Municipality: Brazuelo

Government
  - Mayor: Pedro Fernández Pérez (PP)

Area
  - Total: 98.13 km^{2} (37.89 sq mi)
- Elevation: 965 m (3,166 ft)

Population (2025-01-01)
  - Total: 304
  - Density: 3.10/km^{2} (8.02/sq mi)
- Time zone: UTC+1 (CET)
  - Summer (DST): UTC+2 (CEST)
- Postal Code: 24716
- Telephone prefix: 987
- Climate: Csb
- Website: Brazuelo

Brazuelo (Spanish pronunciation: [bɾaˈθwelo], Leonese: Brazuelu) is a municipality located in the province of León, Castile and León, Spain. According to the 2010 census (INE), the municipality has a population of 321 inhabitants.
