= Valdespino de Somoza =

- Minor local entity
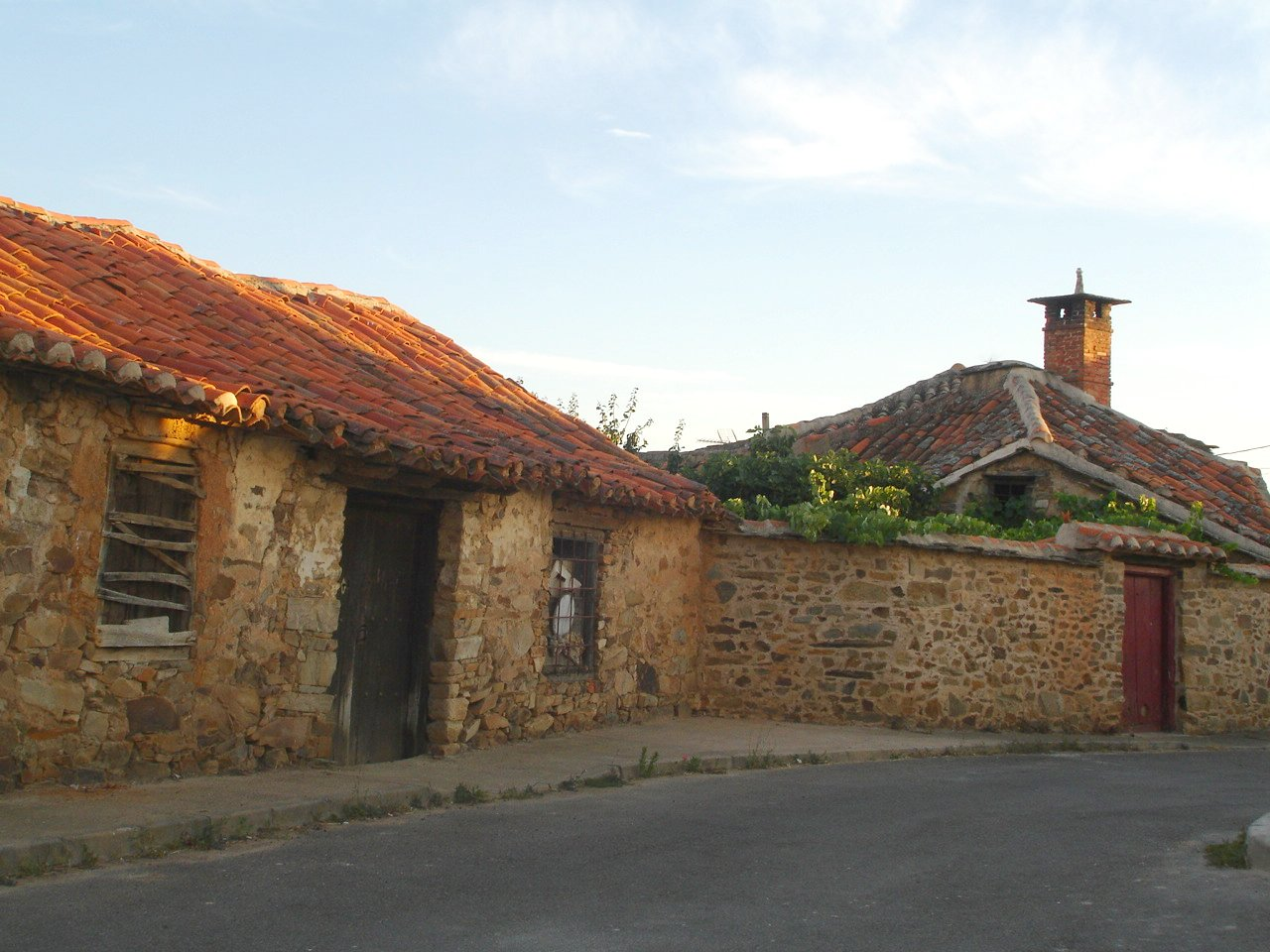

- Location within Province of León Location within Castile and León Location within Spain
- Coordinates: 42°24′12″N 6°8′45″W
- Country: Spain
- Autonomous community: Castile and León
- Province: Province of León
- Municipality: Santiago Millas
- Elevation: 921 m (3,022 ft)

Population
  - Total: 94

Valdespino de Somoza is a locality and minor local entity located in the municipality of Santiago Millas, in León province, Castile and León, Spain. As of 2020, it has a population of 94.

== Geography ==
Valdespino de Somoza is located 58km west-southwest of León, Spain.
