= Mantecada =

Spongy sweet bread originating in Spain

Mantecadas
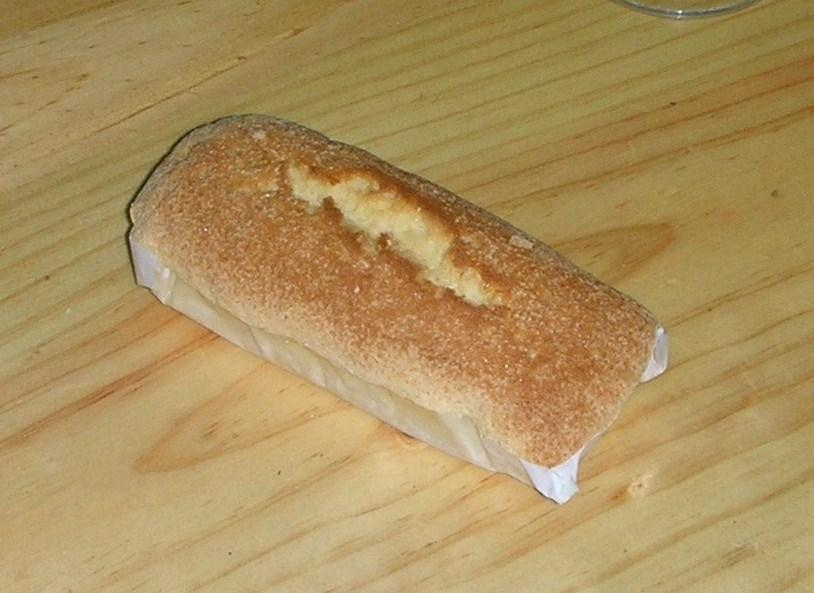
- Type: Sweet bread
- Place of origin: Spain
- Main ingredients: Flour, eggs, butter, sugar

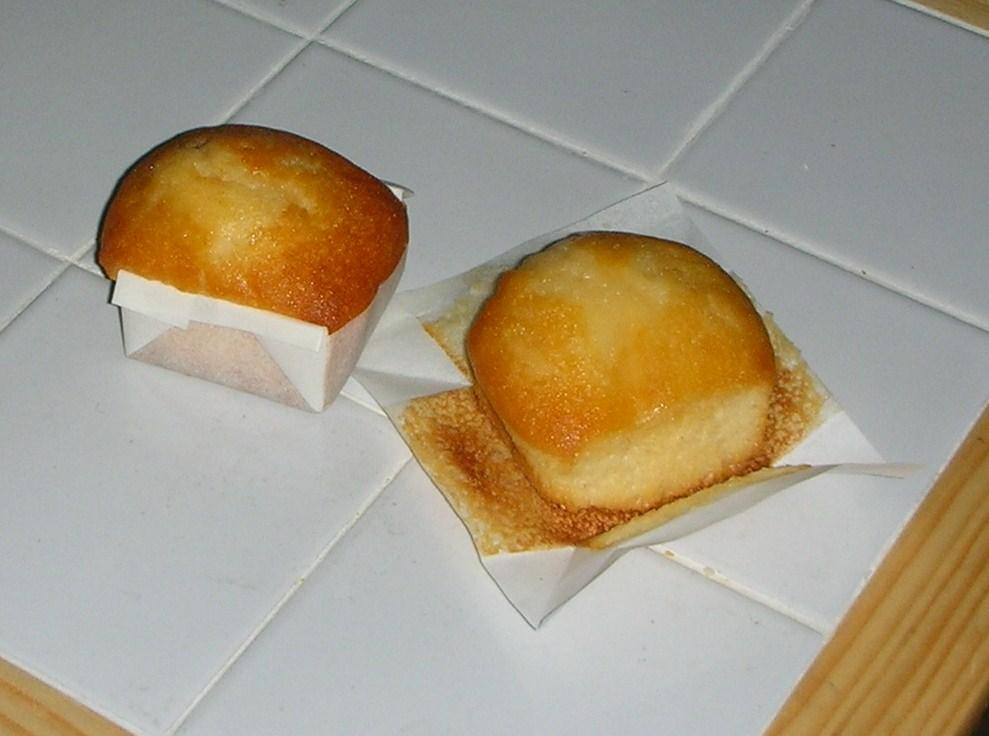
Commercial mantecadas, one showing the open cajilla

Mantecadas are spongy sweet bread originating in Spain. Perhaps the best known mantecadas are from Northwestern Spain, being a traditional product of the city of Astorga, province of León, as well as the nearby Maragateria comarca. They taste very much like pound cake.

Other Spanish regions also prepare mantecadas. There is a factory producing mantecadas in Sardón de Duero, Valladolid Province and another in Maliaño, Cantabria. The Casa Salinas bakery in Tudela, Navarre, reputed for its excellent mantecadas, closed down in January 2011.

Mantecadas are baked in square or rectangular box-shaped paper "cajillas" instead of in the typical muffin round paper cups. The mantecada leaves a characteristic cross-shaped silhouette on the paper when it is removed. In the Alt Maestrat comarca the mantecada square paper cups are known as "caixetes".

There is a type of cake known as mantecada in Colombia and Venezuela where the whole is cut into pieces after baking. Certain brands commercialize packed mini-mantecadas in Mexico and Latin America. Mantecadas should not be confused with mantecados, a much denser, biscuit.

== Mantecadas de Astorga ==
The most famous Mantecadas are the ones prepared in Astorga town under the name Mantecadas de Astorga. Their ingredients are eggs, flour, butter and sugar. Butter is essential in the preparation and differentiates the mantecadas de Astorga from average bizcocho or magdalenas (muffins). They are a protected product as per Geographical indication in the European Union.

== See also ==
- List of quick breads
- Madeleine (cake)
