= Volkswagen Beetle in Mexico =

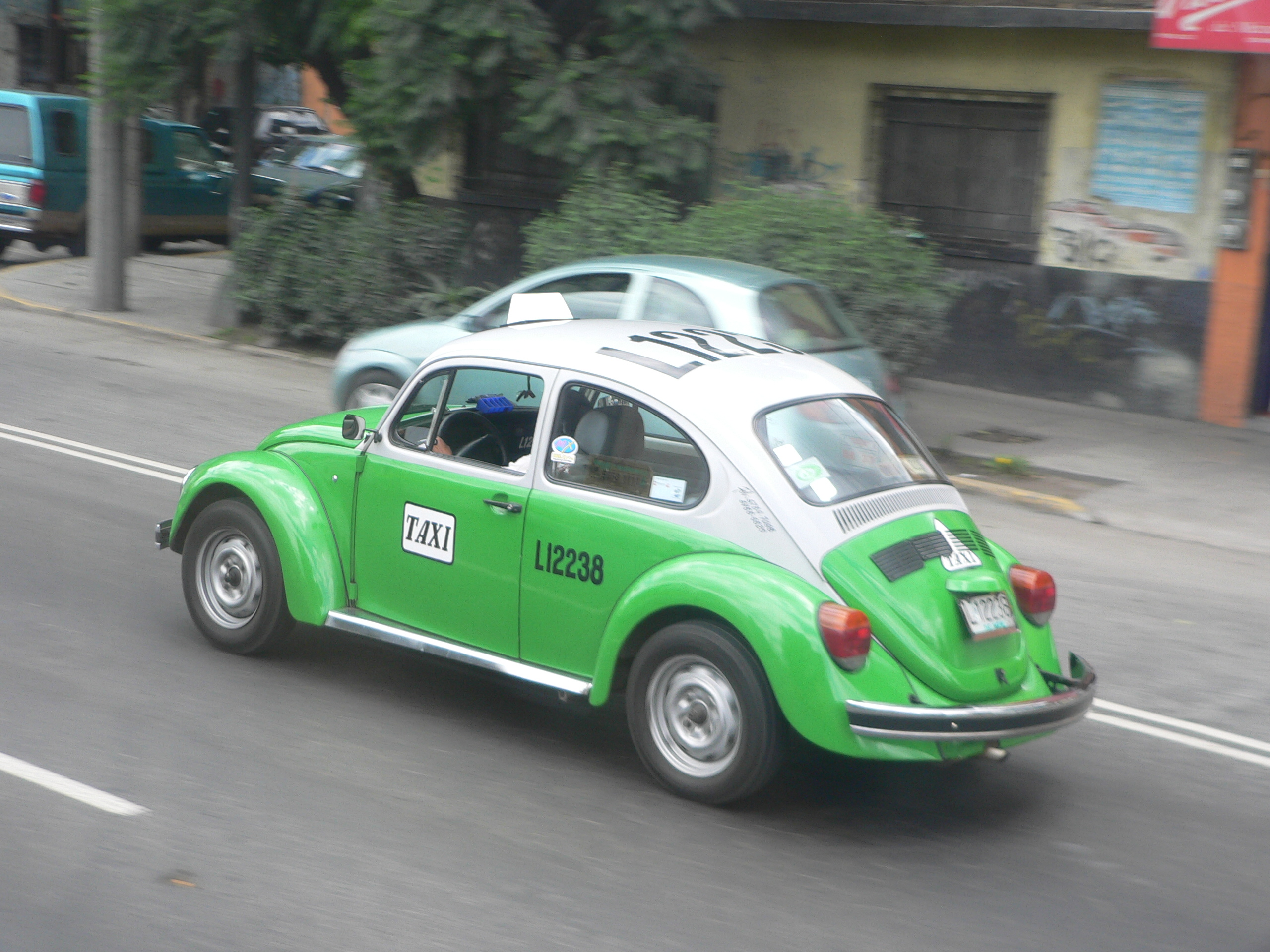
A Volkswagen Beetle taxi in Mexico City.

The Volkswagen Beetle was introduced to Mexico in March 1954, inside the exhibition "Alemania y su Industria" (Germany and its Industry). Four different Volkswagen vehicles were brought to Mexico through Veracruz City for the first time. Those vehicles were: two Sedans 113 in "Export" trim, a convertible, and a VW Bus in luxury trim. Officially, the Bug/Beetle was named "Type I sedan" and the Bus was named "Type II station wagon", though variants included single and double cab pickups.

At that time, the Mexican car market was mostly characterized by American makes and models with large sizes and large engines, which made a huge contrast with the new German entrant. An exhibition was held in the Ciudad Universitaria in Mexico City; during this event, the vehicles were widely admired by the public. The Volkswagen Beetles displayed there were the model with the "oval window". Former Mexican president Lázaro Cárdenas made a trip from Michoacán, just to see this peculiar vehicle. The local press immediately published the news into eight columns under the title "The People's Man" with the "People's Car".

== First steps in Mexico ==
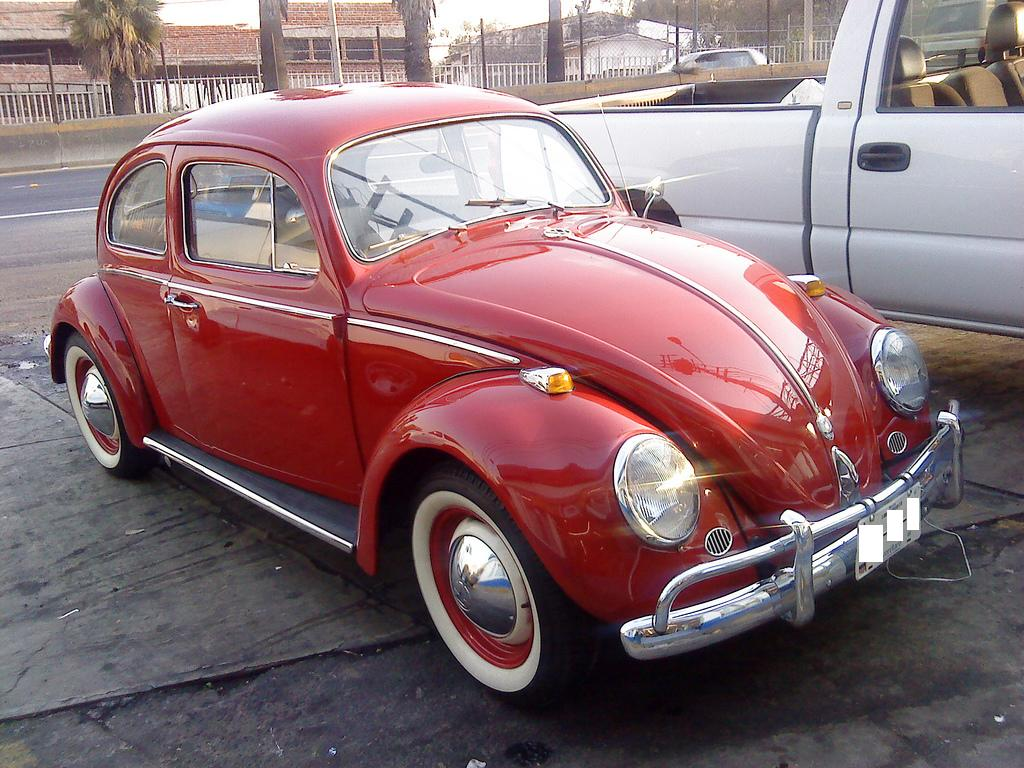
1965 1200 Volkswagen Beetle. Front view.

In response to doubts regarding the Beetle's long-term reliability, Prince Alfonso de Hohenlohe, descendant of a friend of Ferdinand Porsche and a car enthusiast resident of Mexico City, decided to enter seven VW sedans in 1954 Carrera Panamericana competition. All of the Beetles finished the 3211 km race. While none finished in first place, the VWs all had stock 1200cc engines. Some newspapers reported rumors that the engines were Porsche instead of Volkswagen. An expert mechanic from Houston, Texas, was asked to inspect the cars and certified that they had original, unmodified VW engines. This led to the creation of the company Volkswagen Mexicana, S.A. In the same year, Hohenlohe founded the Distribuidora Volkswagen Central, S.A. de C.V. (Central Volkswagen Distributor), which opened its doors the following year as Mexico's first Volkswagen dealership.

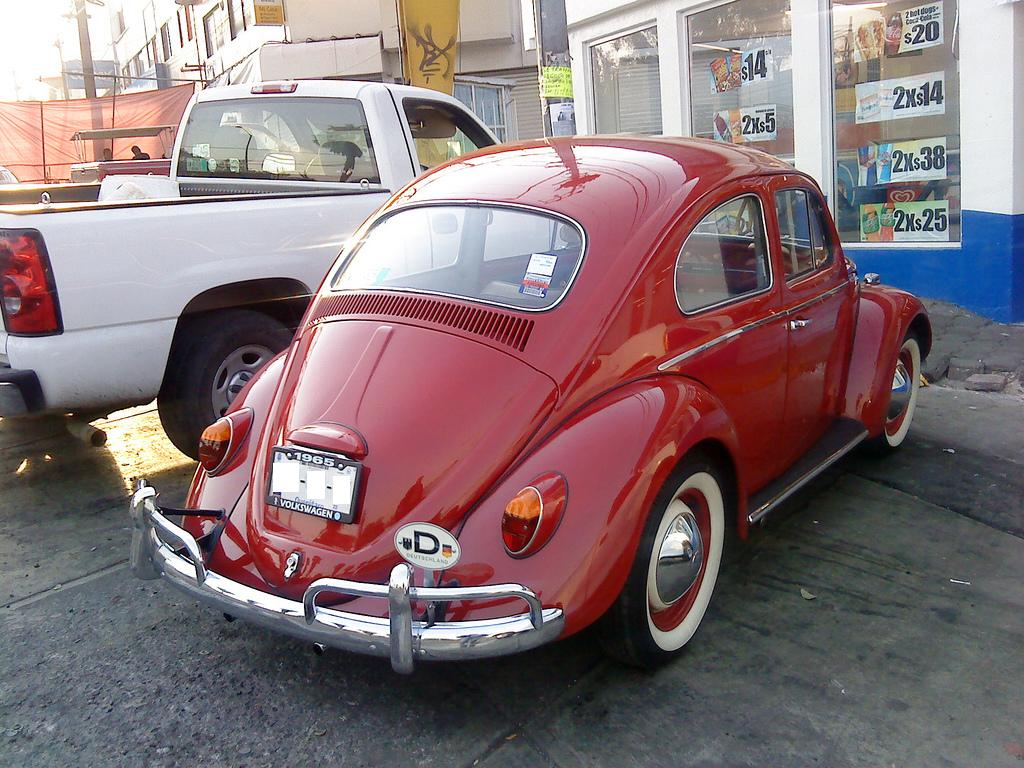
1965 1200 Volkswagen Beetle. Rear view.

In 1961, the first 250 cars were assembled through Automex (later Chrysler de México). In June of that year, a six-month contract was signed with Studebaker-Packard de México to assemble the Beetle from CKD kits (“complete knock down,” or separated pieces) imported from Germany. The following year, 1962, the first Volkswagen assembly plant was established in Xalostoc, State of Mexico, under the name PROMEXA (Promotora Mexicana de Automóviles - Mexican Automobile Promotor). Opening in June, the plant turned out 10 assembled units per day. In January 1964, Volkswagen de México, S.A. de C.V. was established. Production from the Xalostoc plant was unable to meet the growing demand, and in June 1965, a new plant opened in the suburbs of Puebla, Puebla on a 2-million-square-metre (22×10^{6} sq ft) [more commonly measured as 204 hectares or 505 acres]

== Start of production in Puebla ==
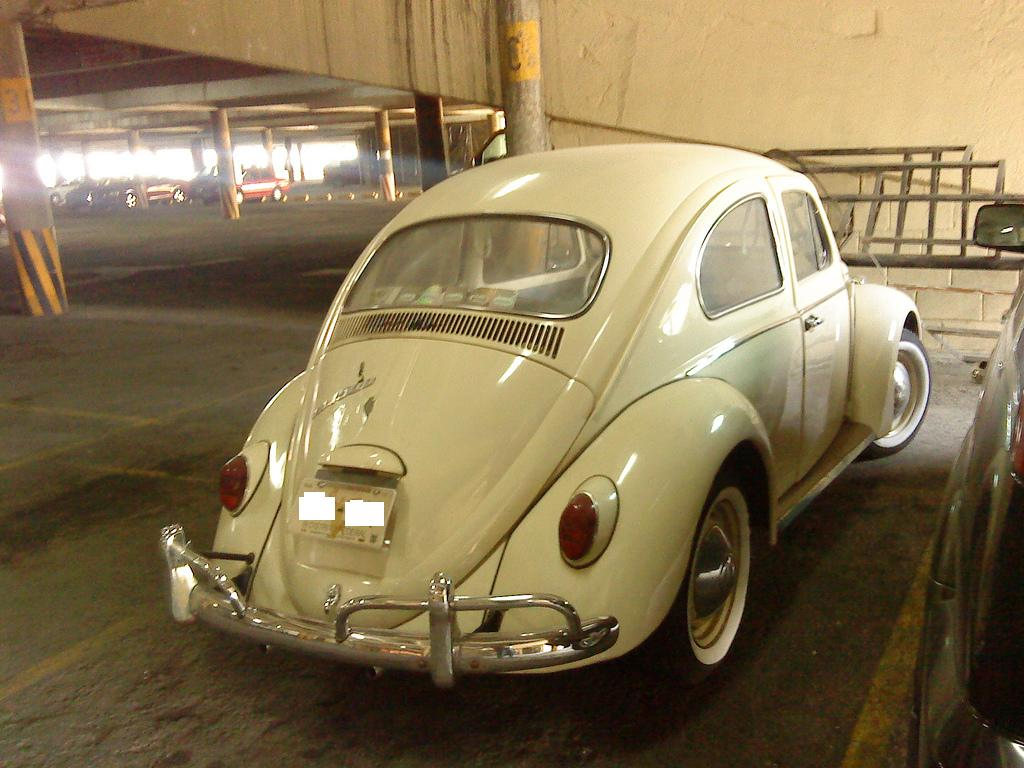
A 1968 Volkswagen Beetle, produced in Puebla City. Note the "VW 1500" badge.

On October 23, 1967, the first Volkswagen Beetle rolled off the assembly line at the Puebla plant. In mid-1968, a new 1500 cc engine was introduced, replacing the previous 1200 cc engine. A "VW 1500" badge or insignia appeared on the car's rear deck lid. On June 12, 1968, Mexico's 100,000th Beetle was produced.

For the 1971 model year, three design changes were made: new bumpers, an engine cover featuring two lateral groups of five louvers each and vertical headlights with their characteristic chromed molding, similar to the cover on the 1968 German Beetle. The Mexican Beetle retained the small windows seen in German models from 1958 to 1964, as well as the five-bolt wheels, similar to those on Brazilian Beetles at that time.

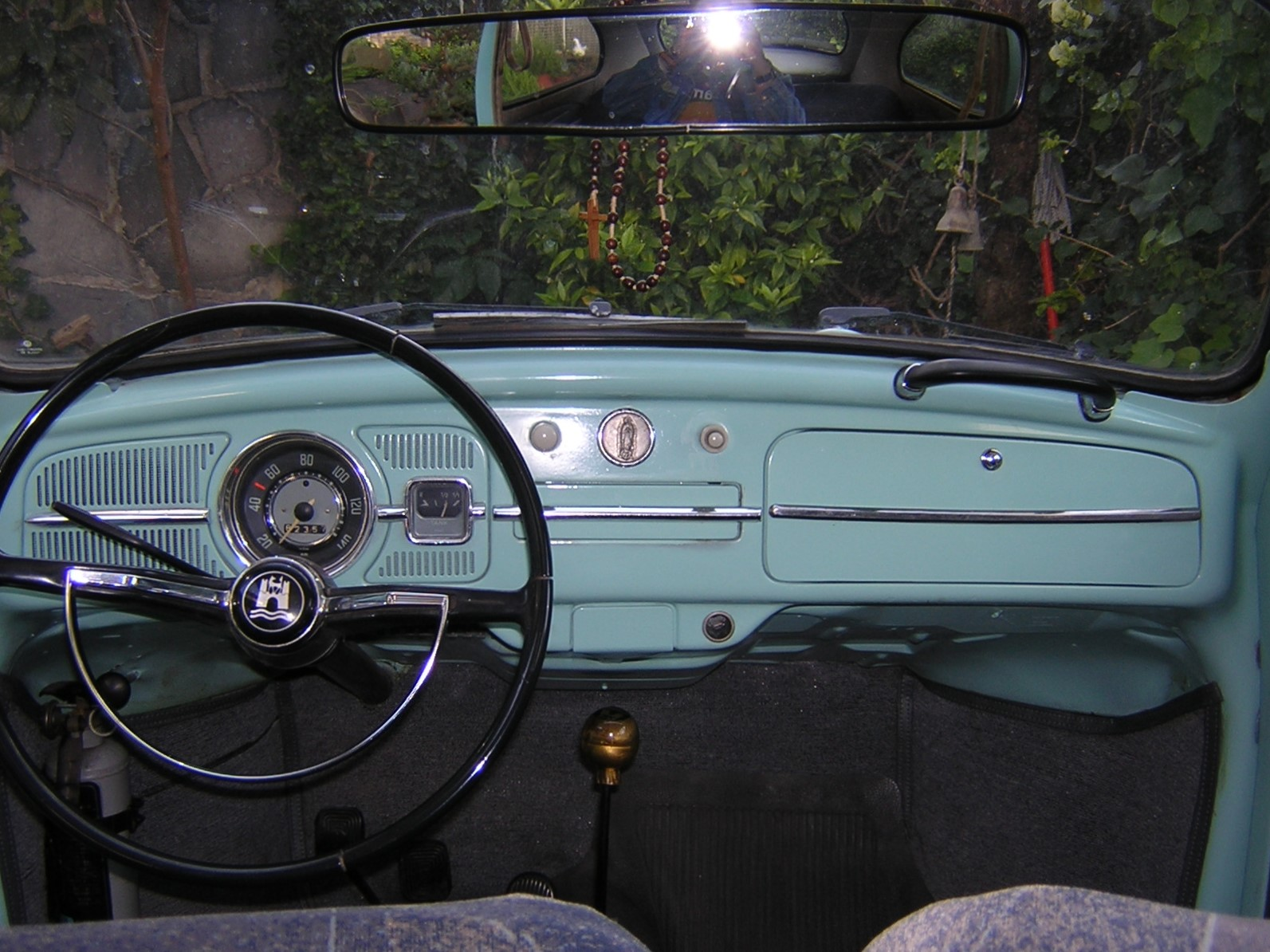
Dashboard of the first Beetles produced in Puebla

In 1971, the 200,000th Mexican Volkswagen Beetle was produced, and exports to Costa Rica and Europe began. That year, the Volkswagen Sedán was selected by the "Departamento del Distrito Federal" to serve as a public transportation vehicle, thus becoming the standard taxi in Mexico City. In 1972, the Volkswagen Beetle received the larger front windows used on German Beetles since 1965, though the rear window remained the smaller 1965–71 size. The larger rear window, introduced on German Beetles in 1972, did not appear on the Mexican Beetle until 1985. Enlarged tail lights, first used on 1971–72 German models (except VW 1200), were also added.

The 1973 model was highly popular, due to the previous year's improvements, as well as the new four-bolt 15-inch wheels (“small 4” as opposed to “wide 5”) with newly designed flat hubcaps, which replaced the original "bowl type" covers. The fuel filler neck was moved from inside the trunk to the right front quarter panel, just above the fender. Inside, a matte black padded dashboard was introduced, resulting in greater comfort and less eye fatigue. The wiper-washer control was also moved from a button on the dashboard to a lever on the right of the steering column. Later that year, additional improvements appeared, including a four-spoke black steering wheel.

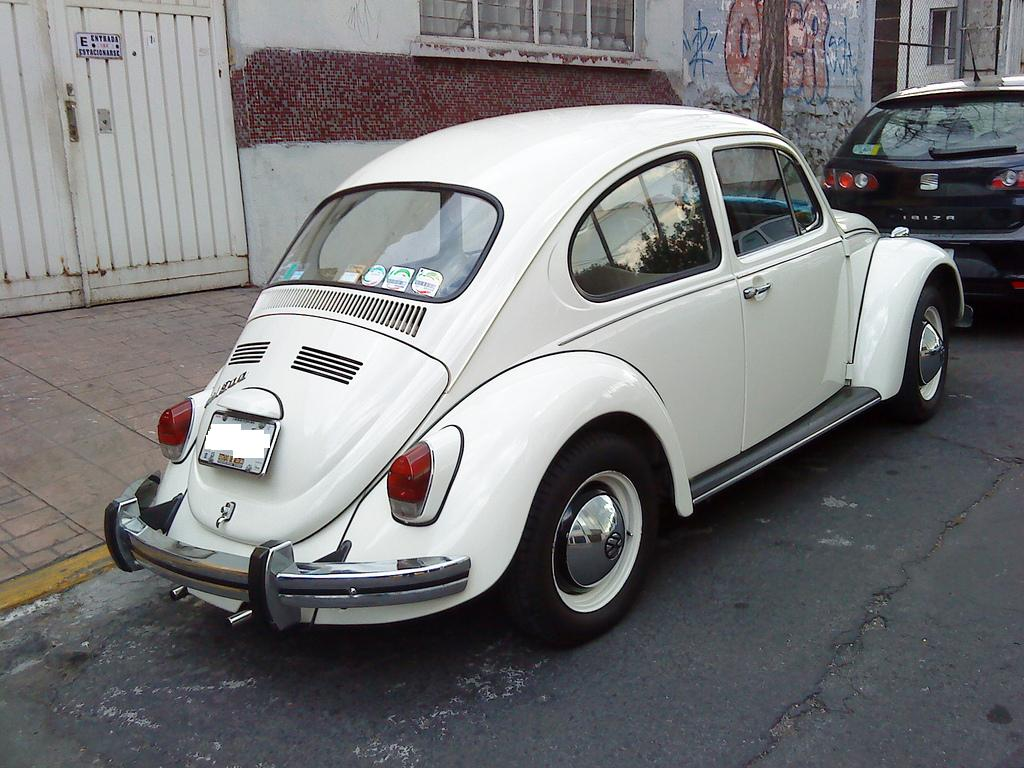
1972 1500 Volkswagen Beetle. Rear view.

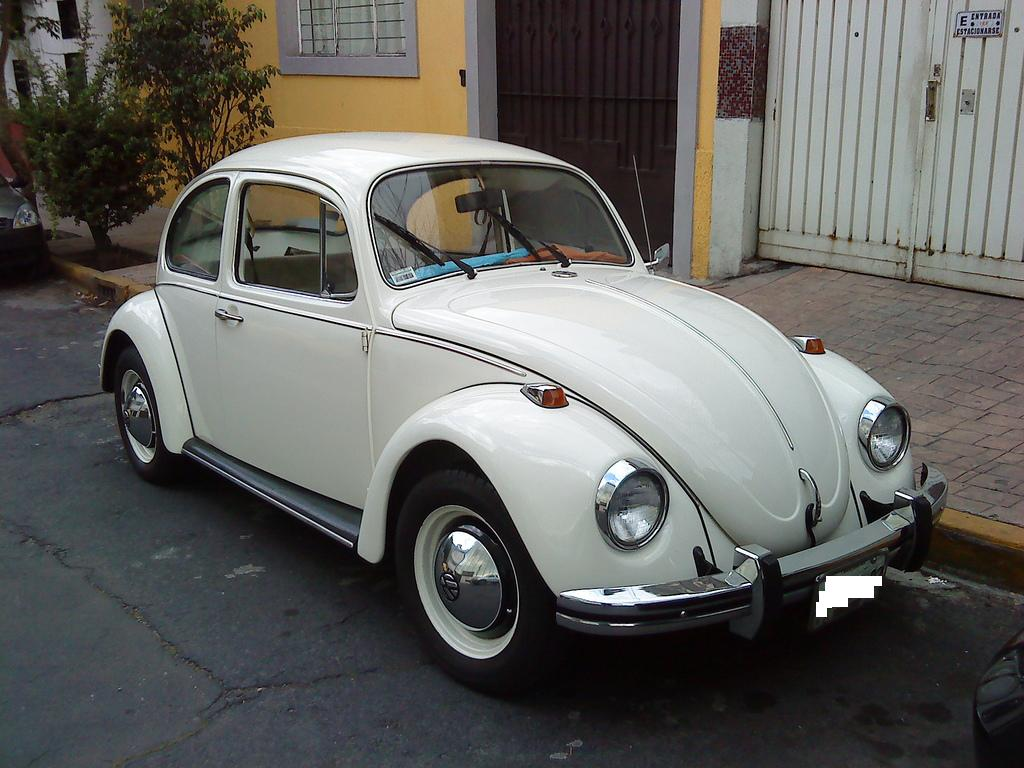
1972 1500 Volkswagen Beetle. Front view.

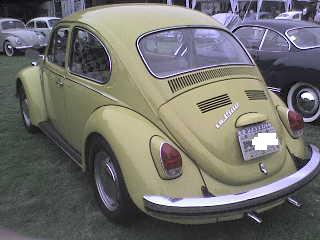
1973 1500 Volkswagen Beetle. Rear view.

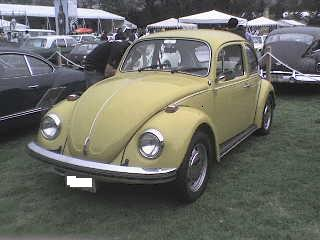
1973 1500 Volkswagen Beetle. Front view.

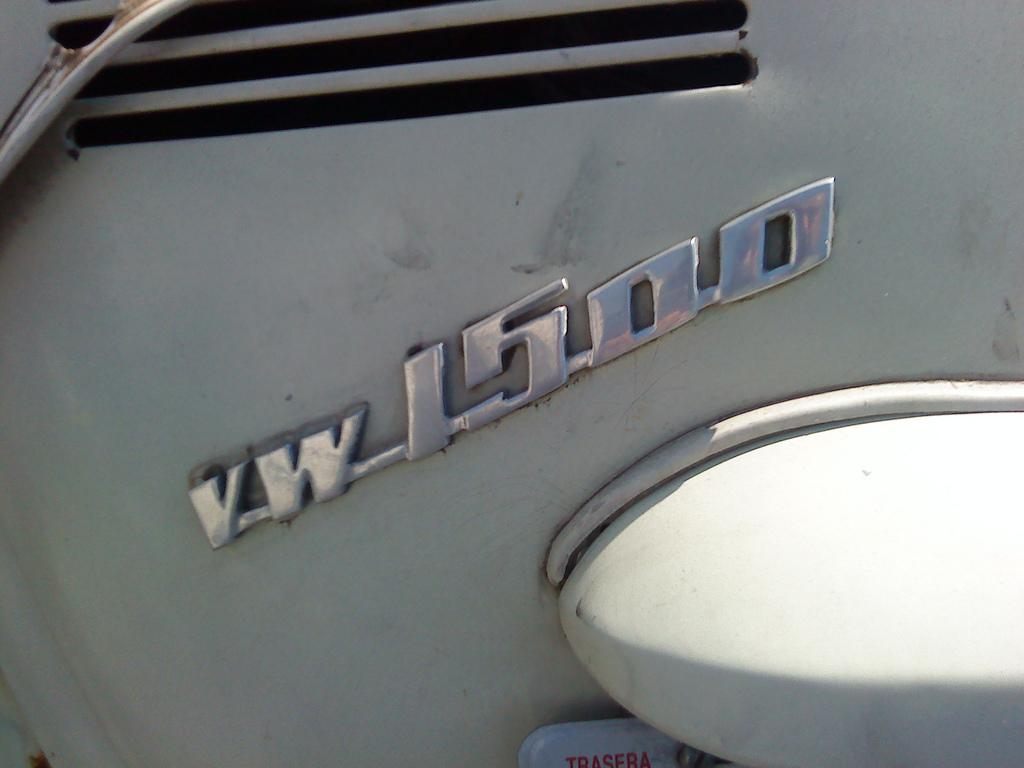
VW 1500 Badge. Used in Mexican Beetles between 1968 and 1973.

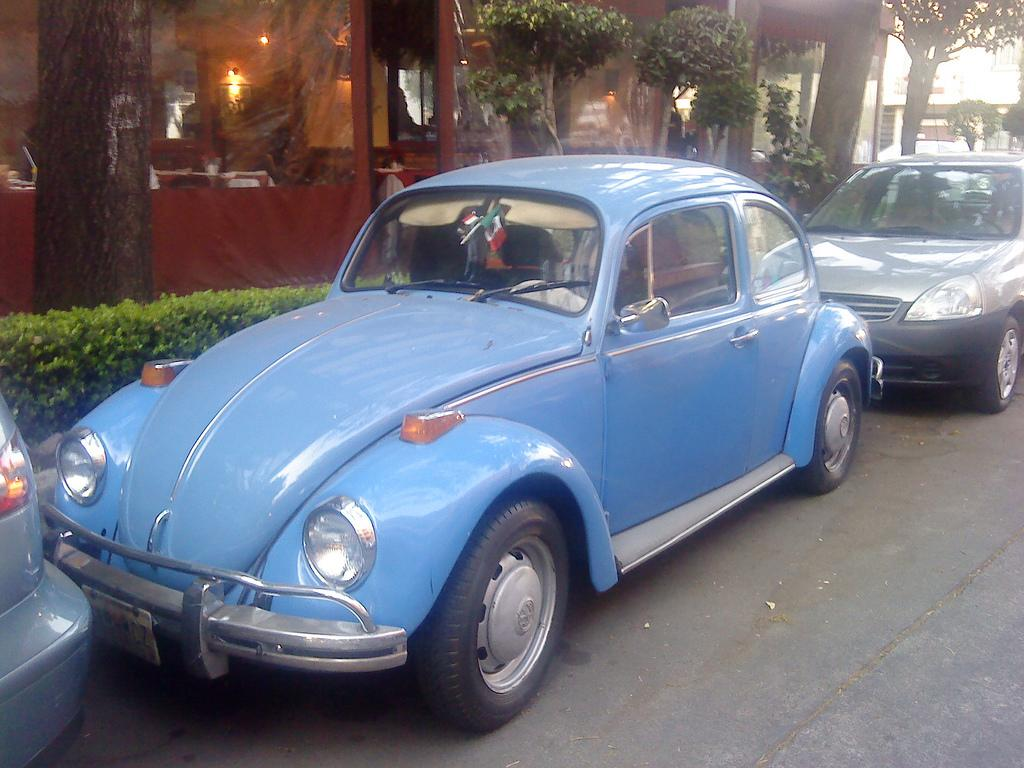
1976 1600 Volkswagen Beetle. Front view.

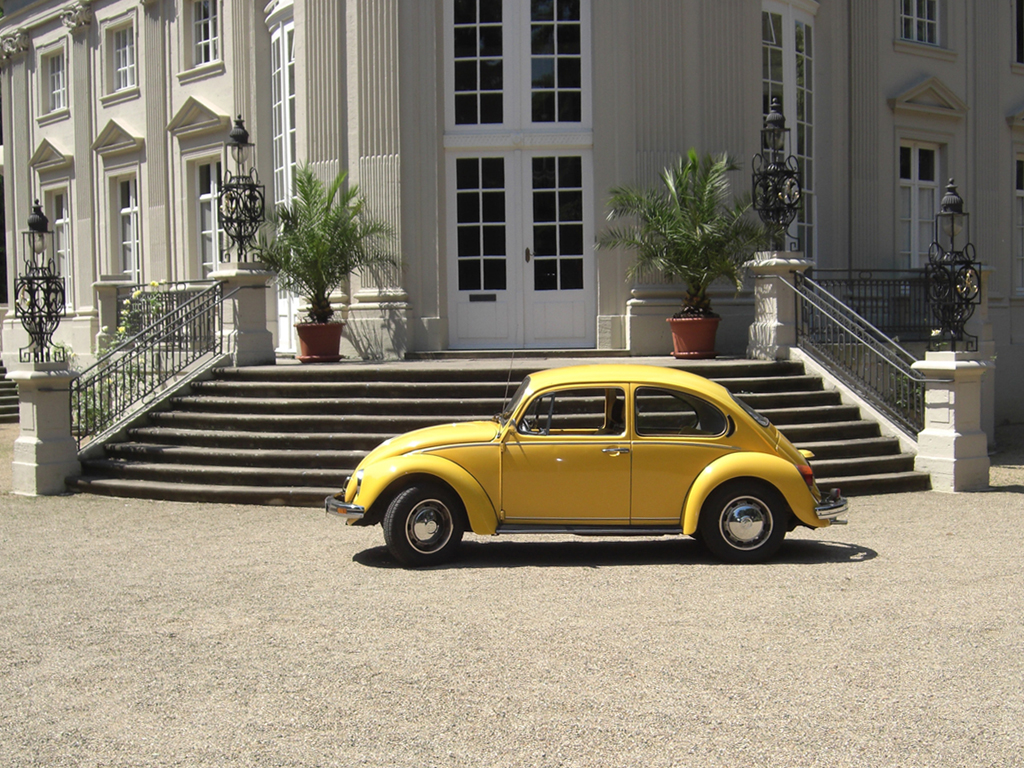
1984 Volkswagen 1200L Sunny Bug. Limited edition exported to Europe.

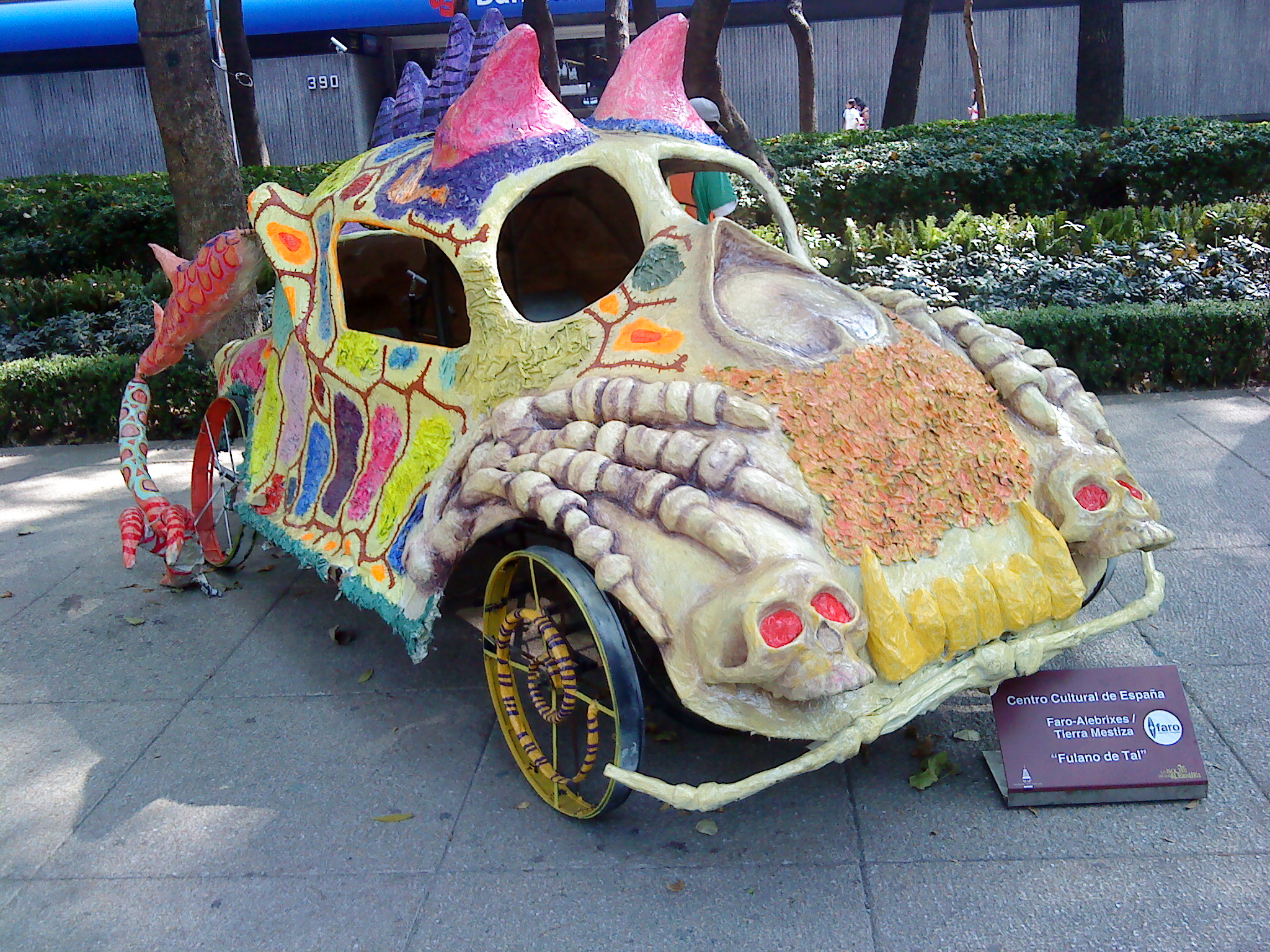
An Alebrije (Mexican artcraft) in the shape of a Volkswagen Beetle

The 1974 models brought further modifications. A 1600 cc engine producing 44 HP SAE (50 PS DIN) replaced the previous 1500. The front fenders were enlarged, new front turn signals (identical to the ones on American spec Beetles) were added, and larger round taillights with amber turn signals were introduced, one year after their 1973 appearance on German-made Beetles. The engine cover remained unchanged, except it no longer had an emblem. Inside, the front seats were redesigned, and the interior colour was changed from gray to black. Also, the front hood release lever was relocated inside the glovebox, as on 1969 and later German Beetles.

In 1975, the engine cover was again changed to include four groups of vents, with six on the two inner groups and seven on the two outer groups, as on 1972 and later German models (except VW 1200). In June, the 500,000th Mexican Beetle was produced. There were two limited editions: The Volkswagen Beetle Jeans and the Volkswagen Beetle Sport Jeans featuring special wheels and unique paint colors. Beginning that year, chrome hubcaps were reserved for Volkswagen Sedan equipped, unlike the base model which had no hubcaps.

In 1977, the most important modification was that the front turn signals were moved to the front bumper, as on 1975 and later European Beetles, though they remained atop the fenders on US- and Canada-spec cars until its end in 1979. With the introduction of the Caribe, some of the colours introduced the new model were available on the Mexican VW. In addition, vinyl upholstery was discontinued, leaving cloth–vinyl upholstery as the only option.

== Export to Europe ==
Beginning in 1978 the Volkswagen Beetle introduced air vents on the front trunk cover to bring fresh air to the interior. The air exited through a couple of rear vents behind the rear side windows. Hub caps disappeared from the equipment list in all models. With the cancellation of production in Germany, the Mexican Volkswagen Beetle started exporting to European markets, including West Germany, Austria, Belgium, the Netherlands, Italy, Switzerland, and other countries. This exportation model was different from the Mexican market Beetle. Its engine was a 1200cc 34CV (33 hp). From the 1982 model on, the engine cover had no exterior vents. The different engine cover made it similar to German-produced VW 1200, as well as Mexican market Beetles sold before 1970. Also introduced were optional metallic paint colors: Silver Metallic, Copper Red Metallic, Cadmium Blue Metallic and Viper Green Metallic. These colors were also available on the Caribe and the new European market Volkswagen Scirocco, as a reminder of the late 1970s models.

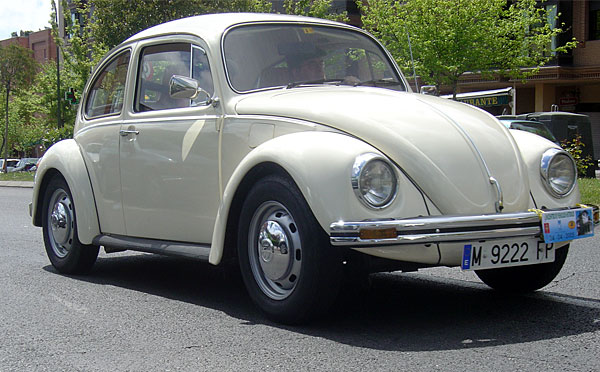
1980 Volkswagen 1200L. Produced in Mexico for Europe. Front view.

In September 1980 the company produced the one millionth Mexican-made Volkswagen.

In 1981, the Volkswagen (the manufacturer's model name from this point forward) came equipped with front seats that integrated headrests as a required safety feature and new cloth upholsteries. The new seats had the same design as the Volkswagen Type 3 and bus vehicles previously seen in Europe and the United States in the late 60s. On May 15, 1981, the 20 millionth worldwide produced Volkswagen Beetle was manufactured by Volkswagen de México. A commemorative limited edition was sold with Silver metallic paint and the same lower side stripes seen on the Jetta. Around this time, the nickname Vocho came into popular usage in Mexico.

For the 1983 model year, the Volkswagen received new front seats with adjustable headrests, already seen in cars such the Caribe and the Atlantic. A newly added item was the control light for the brake circuits on the dashboard. 1983 also introduced a limited edition Aubergine Metallic paint scheme. This also featured its wheels painted to match the body color and seats upholstered in tweed Grey and Aubergine.

In 1984 was the marque's 30th anniversary in Mexico, for this reason, three commemorative limited editions were launched. The first one was a Volkswagen painted in Alpine White with the side lower stripes already seen in the 20 millionth edition, its upholstery was red velour with sides and door panels in black vinyl.

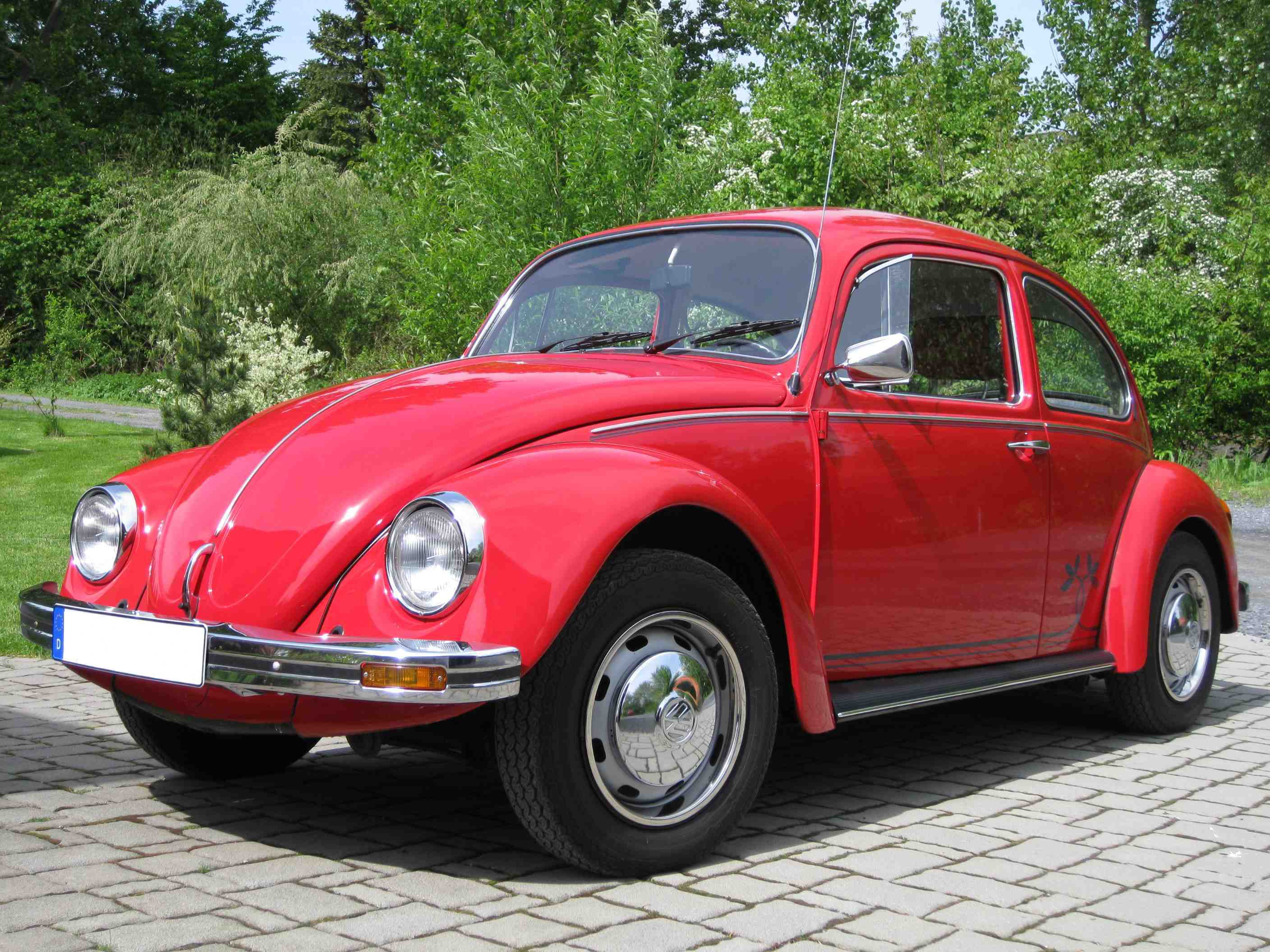
1984 Volkswagen 1200L. Limited edition "Der Samtrote Sonderkäfer" for West-Germany only.

Another limited edition available only in West-Germany was painted in velvet-red (German: Samtrot) with stripes and flower-decor on the sides. This model also sported the same red velour upholstery like the Mexican special edition. The third one, a yellow painted Volkswagen, with yellow velour upholstery. The sides and door panels were white; however, elements such as the dashboard, the armrests, the rear ashtray and the interior rubber mat keep its typical black color.

In 1985, exportations to Europe ended, and a grey metallic special edition called the Jubilée Käfer (50 Jahre Käfer = 50 years Beetle in German) was launched. It had newly designed steel wheels (as seen in some convertible models in the late 70s), and its engine was the 1200cc 34CV (33 hp) DIN. This edition was only available in the European markets where the Mexican Beetle was sold. At this time (model year 1986), the Mexican Volkswagen receives the larger rear window from 1972 and later German Beetles, and the bulged rear apron of the 1975 and later German Beetles.

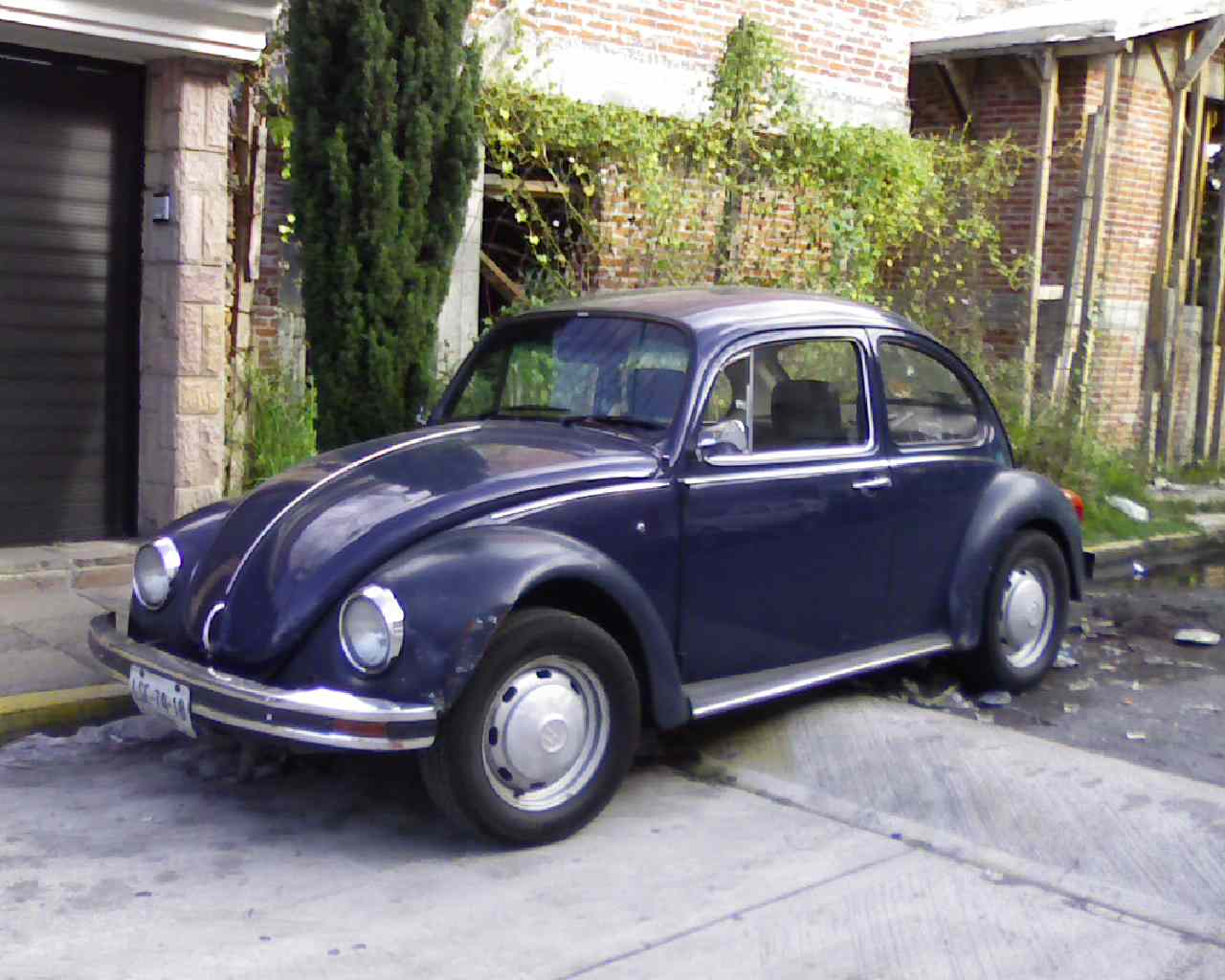
The Volkswagen c. 1987.

In mid-1986, a new Limited Edition was launched in Mexico: The Volkswagen Europa Edition 1. This was the first Volkswagen available in Mexico in many years painted in black; besides this special painting, this new Limited Edition had chrome hub caps (the norm in the 80's were matt finished hub caps), inside it had seats upholstered in a honeycomb black and white design with Recaro headrests, plus an AM/FM stereo cassette player radio (usually the only audio equipment available on Mexican Beetles were the eternal Sapphire XI AM monoaural radio) with two speakers and a basket below the dashboard, as well as side and rear special badges. This year, the Volkswagen received a "double diagonal" braking system, already used in all the Beetle for export to Europe, this system was characterized by connecting the right front brake, with the rear left brake, and vice versa. In addition, the Volkswagen received an intermittent modality in its wiper/washer system. However, the metallic colors were no longer available.

In 1987 the company introduced a new limited-edition model: The Volkswagen Europa Edition 2. The differences from the 1986 edition 1 were: its color was Grey Metallic, its front seats had normal headrests, though, they were now upholstered in grey tweed cloth with red and blue thin stripes. Additionally the basket below the dashboard was no longer available, but the Edition 2 gained tinted windows. This was the first Mexican Beetle available with such equipment; however, the auto kept the chrome hub caps and its AM/FM stereo cassette radio.

== Price reduction and anti-pollution measures ==
For the 1989 model year, and in part because of a government decree that required the company to cut the retail price and tax reduction, the Mexican Beetle was relaunched as the Volkswagen Sedan. This new model lost its wheel caps, the body vents it had sported since 1978, and the fittings were of lower quality.

1990 saw the production of the two millionth Mexican Volkswagen, which was also the one millionth Mexican Beetle.

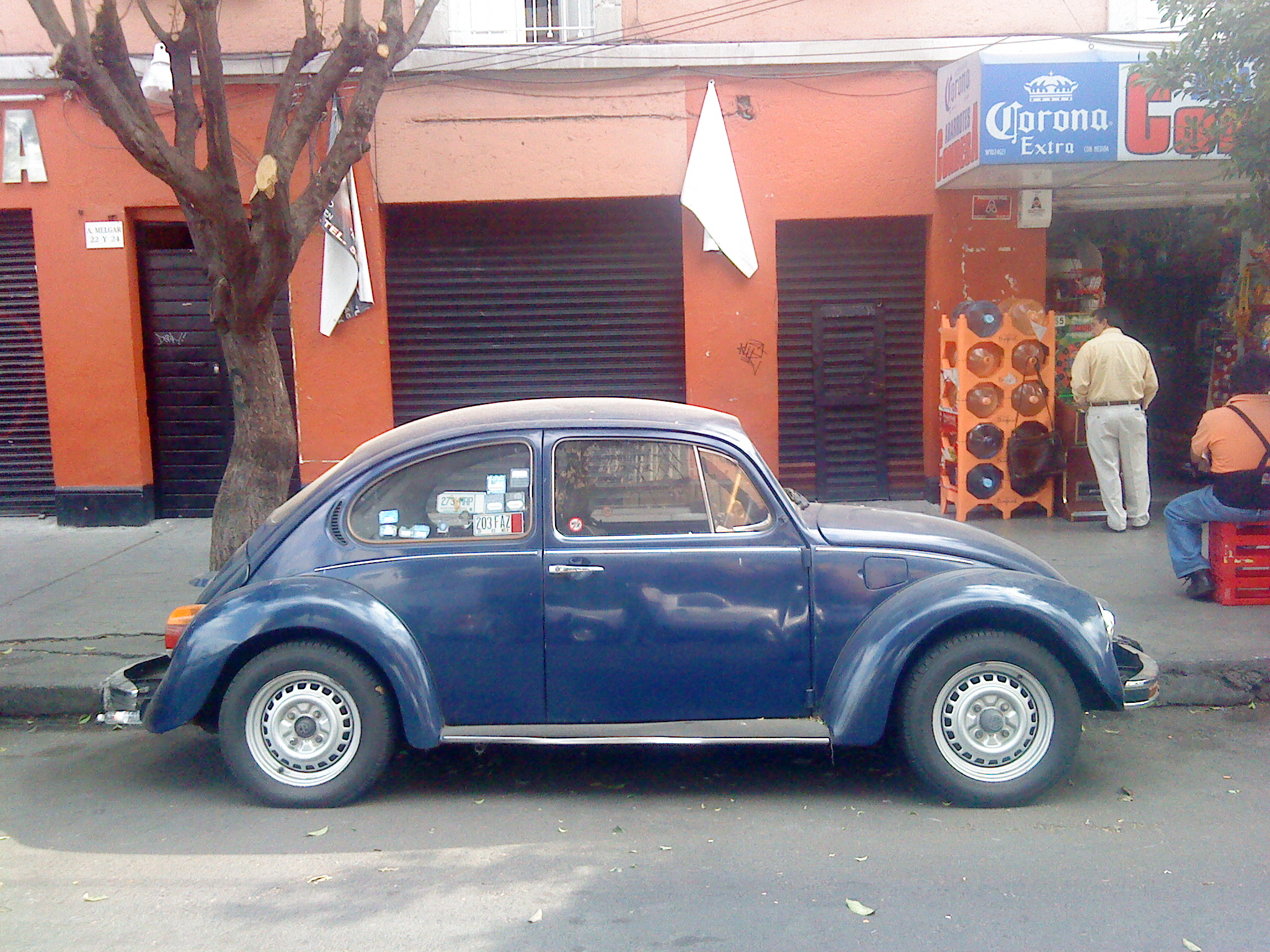
1992 Volkswagen Sedán. In this car the Brazilian stamped steel wheels are observed. Those wheels were fitted in some units between 1992 and 1994.

In the 1991 model year, by governmental disposition, the Volkswagen Beetle featured from now on a catalytic converter; however, it kept its carburetor, its electrical system with a generator and the old ignition system. These changes did not affect its power and performance. In the passenger compartment, the dashboard received new light and emergency light switches, as well as a new two-arm steering wheel. Those elements came from the design of the Golf. In addition, the Volkswagen Beetle had now a new alarm system as series equipment. Externally, this model differed due to the rear apron of its central body, which was now more bulged. The function of this feature was to allow more space in accommodating the new catalytic converter within the engine compartment. The exhaust system also had only a single tailpipe, in contrast to the two tailpipes shown in the previous models.

The 1992 model was fitted with Brazilian steel wheels, with a slightly different design than the ones previously seen. These wheels are often, but not always, found in some vehicles produced between 1991 and 1995. On June 23 the Volkswagen Beetle reached 21 million units produced throughout the world. At the Puebla plant, Volkswagen launched a new commemorative edition. This new limited edition was characterized by its side and rear anagrams "21 Million", its chrome wheel caps, and tinted windows. Inside, this new model had a light grey velour upholstery with stripes in discrete colors, and an AM/FM stereo cassette player audio system. This version was available in the following colors: Alpine White, Tornado Red, Steel Blue Metallic, Turquoise Green Metallic and Satin Gray Metallic.

For the 1993 model year, the 'Digifant' electronic fuel injection replaced the carburetor, indicated by an emblem on the cover of the engine reading 1600i. At this time, some of the sedans had the velour upholstery from the Jetta GL in gray flannel. An electronic ignition system was introduced, and the engine also received hydraulic lifters and a spin-on oil filter. In the same year, and to replace the "21 Million" edition a new Volkswagen Sedán GL was also introduced as a limited edition; it was also called the Volkswagen Sedán Wolfsburg Edition. This edition was available only in three exterior colors: Steel Blue Metallic, Satin Grey Metallic and Indian Red Pearl. This version featured a black velour upholstery and two outside mirrors.

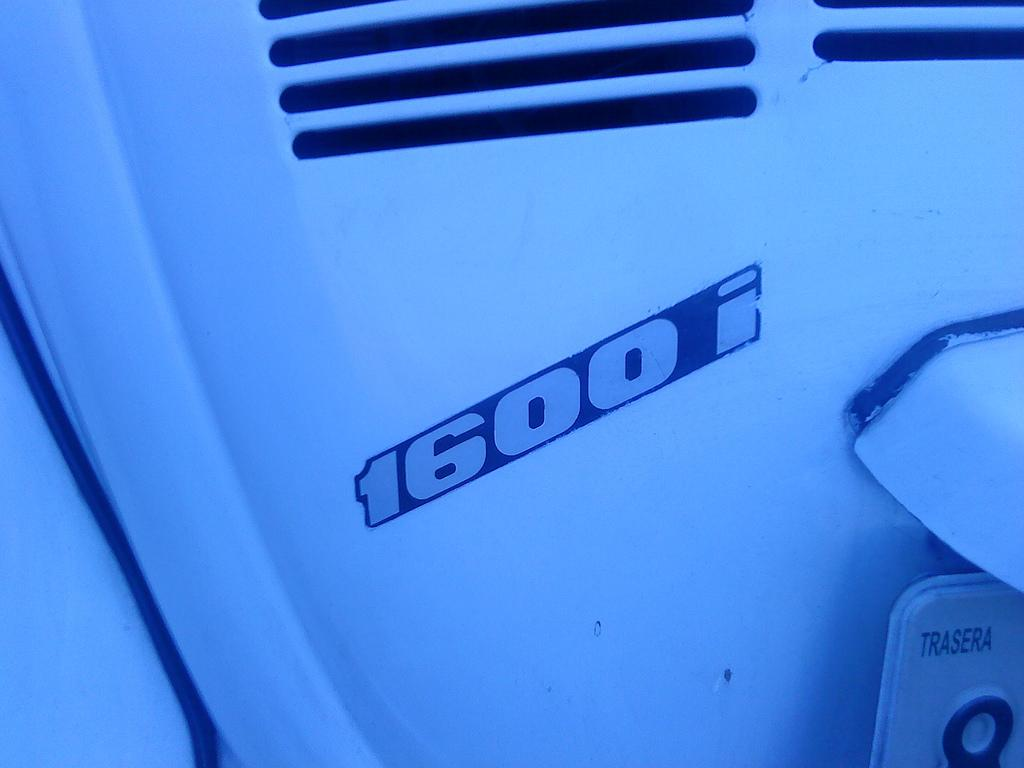
Badge VW 1600i. Available in models 1993–1995.

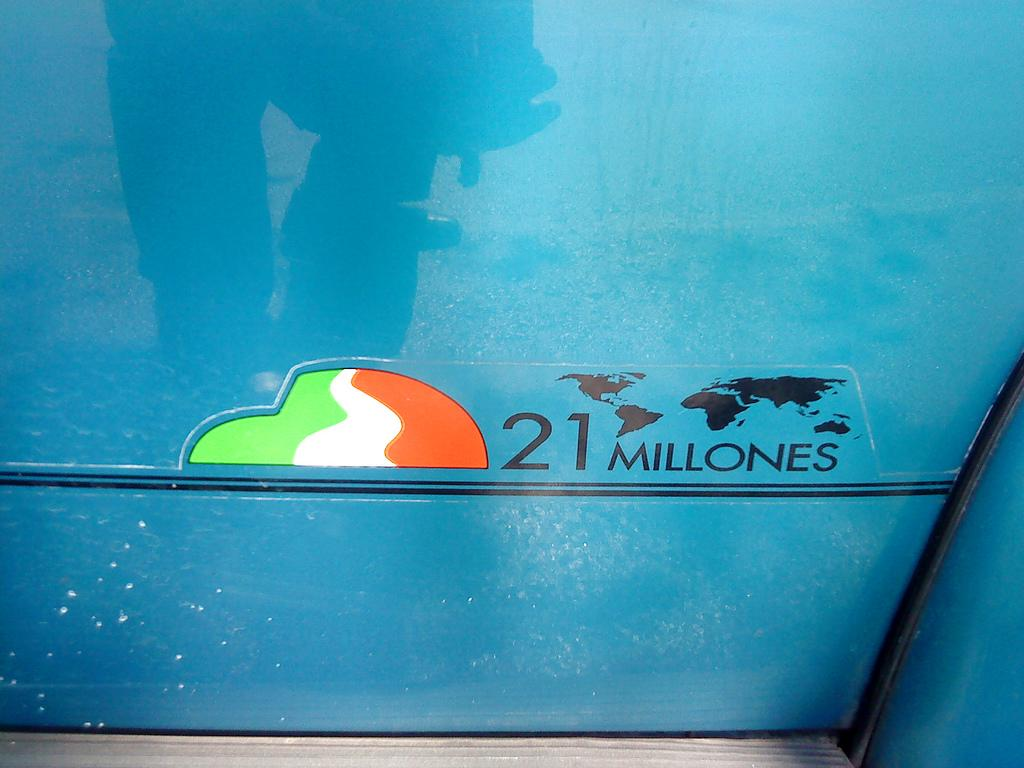
Volkswagen Beetle 21 million Edition badge.

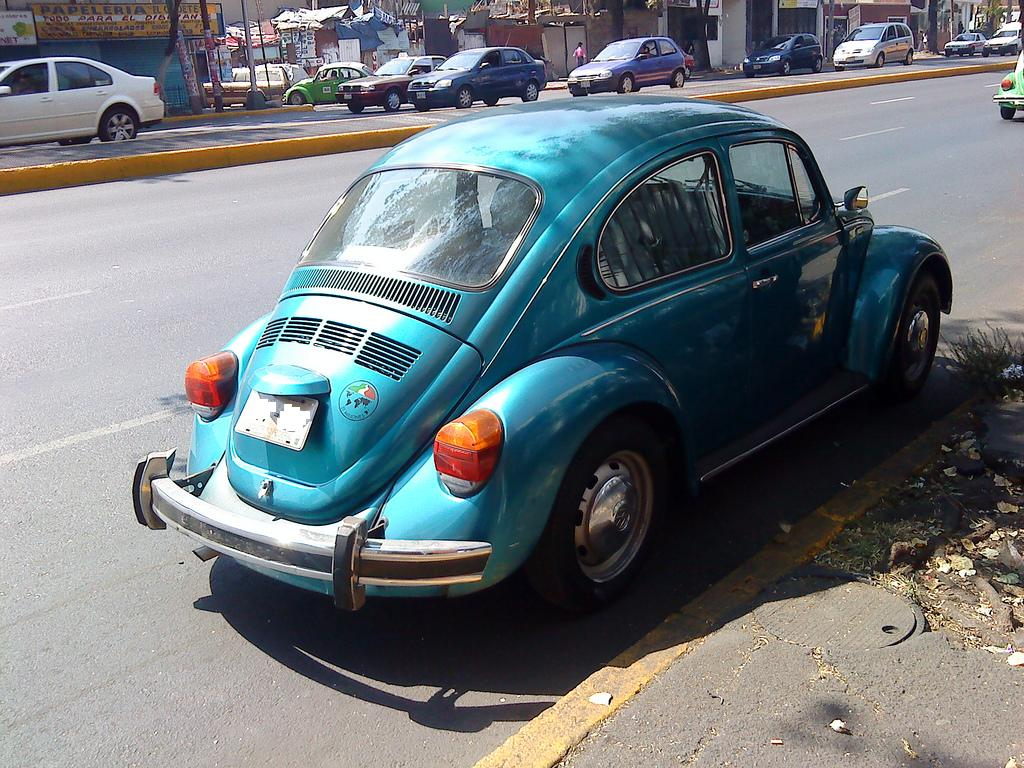
1993 Volkswagen Beetle 21 Million Edition. Rear view.

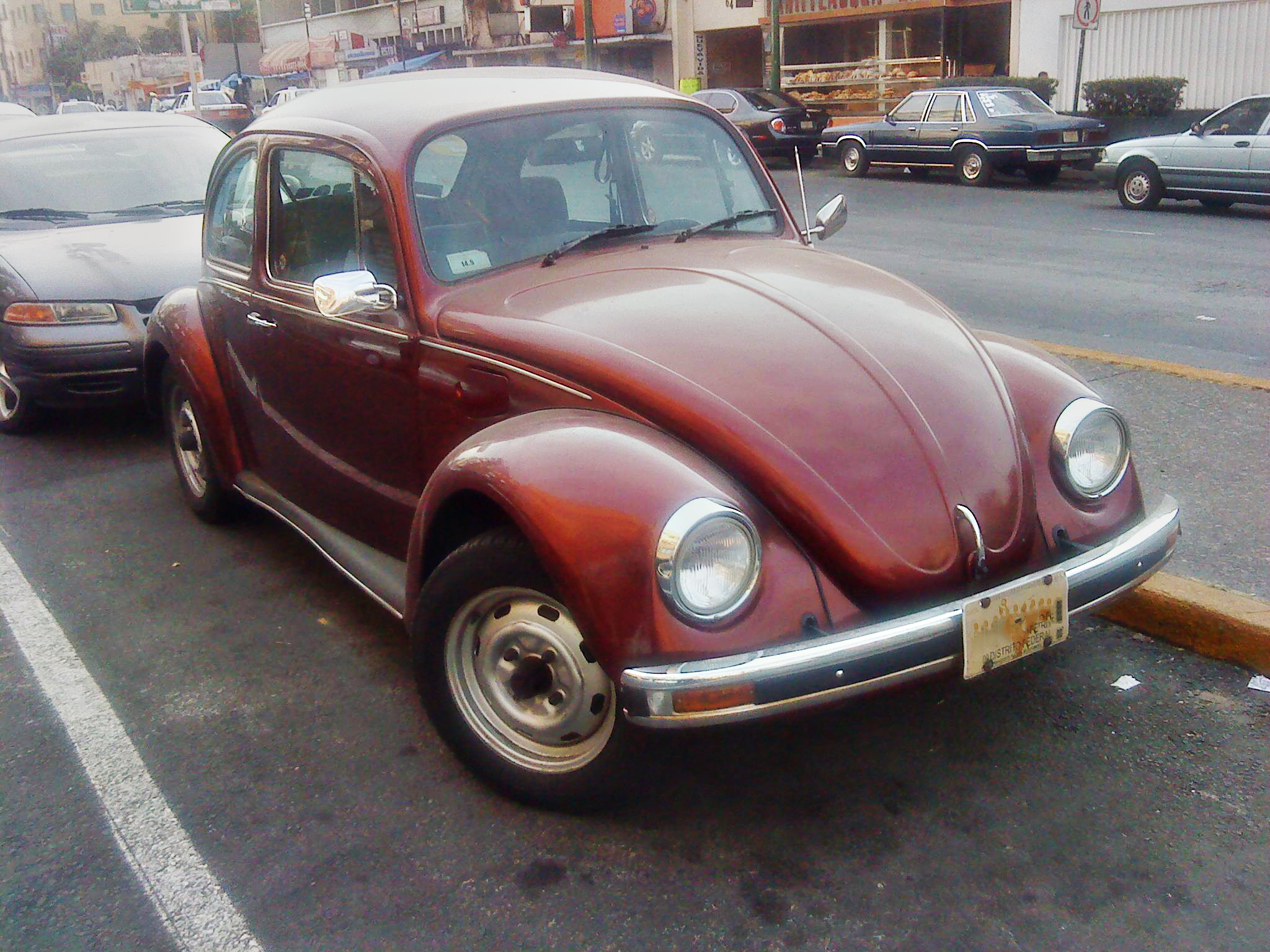
1993 Volkswagen Beetle GL 1993. Front view.

In 1994, Volkswagen celebrated its 40th anniversary in Mexico. To commemorate the occasion four new Limited Editions from the Vocho were launched:

- Volkswagen Firebeetle. It was painted only in black. It had side and rear anagrams "Firebeetle" surrounded with flames and it had 15" alloy wheels. Inside the car there was black cloth upholstery with red stripes, and an AM/FM stereo cassette player radio.
- Volkswagen Beetle Edition One It was painted in Pink Metallic, with an anagram "Edition One" on the engine cover. It had two outside mirrors and chromed hub caps. Its upholstery was a beige cloth with pink embroidery.
- Volkswagen Beetle 40th Anniversary It was painted in Kansas Beige, as well as the "Edition One" it had two outside mirrors and chromed hub caps. It had a commemorative anagram on the engine cover. Its upholstery was a beige cloth with multicolor embroidery.
- Volkswagen Beetle 40th Anniversary It was painted in Azul Mezclilla, as well as the "Edition One" it had two outside mirrors and chromed hub caps. It had a commemorative sticker on the rear window. Its upholstery was a Gray cloth with multicolor embroidery. Less known features, it was fitted from factory with a Blaupunkt Cancun radio and speakers, front drum brakes (Disk brakes were fitted from the 95' model and up), and an mk2 Jetta interior door handle from the Volkswagen's parts bin (191857607 A - 321857607 A). Sometimes it is confused with the 1995 jeans, but the upholstery is completely different. Also this colour variety has nicknames as "Lavender Blue edition" and "Cornflower Blue edition".

== Economic crisis and sales decline ==
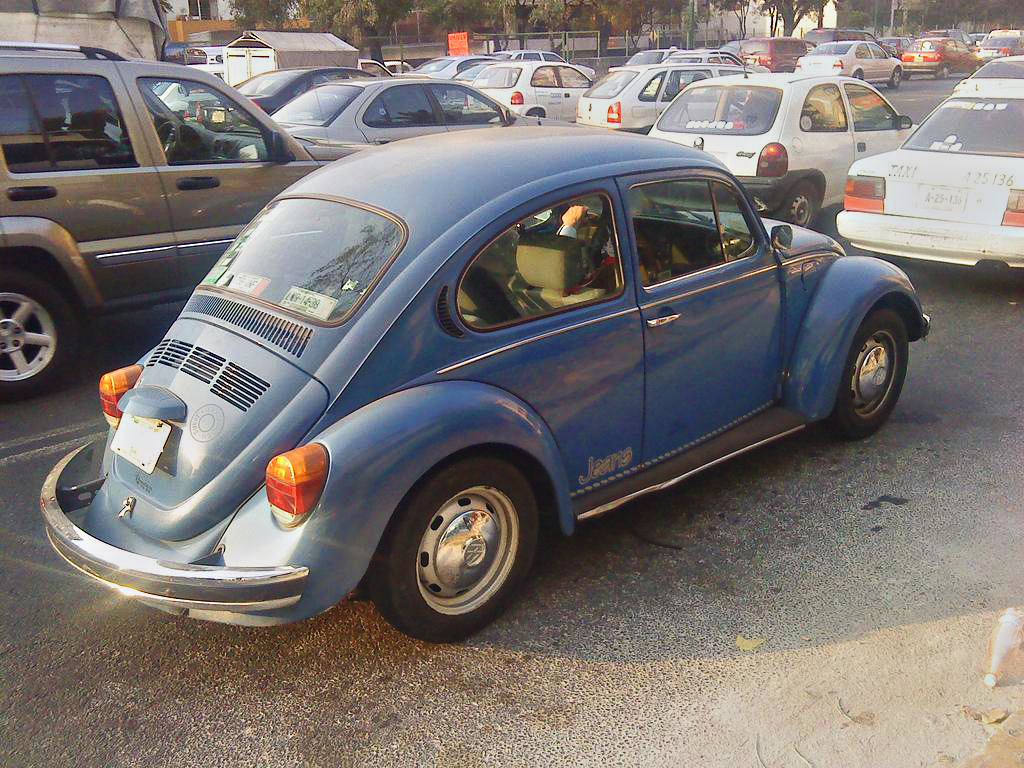
1995 Volkswagen Sedán Jeans. rear view.

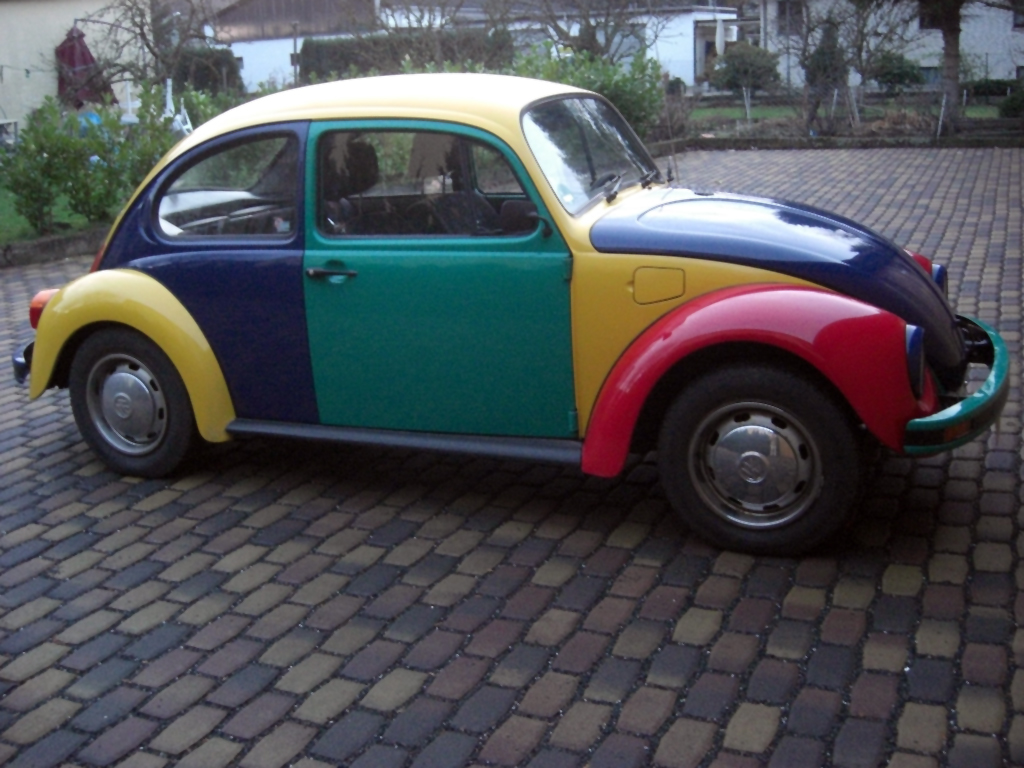
1996 Volkswagen Sedán Harlequin. Side view. This unit was photographed in Europe. Its original hub caps were matte finished.

1995 was a very important year for the Mexican Vocho, because many improvements were fitted into the car, like: New front disc brakes, new automatic front seat belts, new fixed rear seat belts, a new anchor for the rear seat back, and an alternator replaced the generator, among a total of 87 improvements according to Volkswagen. There were three new colors available: Bright White, Verona Red, and Black (this latter color had been previously available in some limited editions, but this was the first time in which this color was adopted by regular models). This year, and looking forward to increase the sales in so adverse economical conditions in Mexico due to the 1994 economic crisis in Mexico in 1995, a new Limited Edition was launched: El Volkswagen Beetle Jeans. This new version, painted in Jean Blue, had chromed hub caps, tinted windows, side and rear "Jeans" anagrams, and a blue jean upholstery on its seats.

1996, the same as in 1973, was divided into two different phases on the Mexican Volkswagen Beetle history. On the first one all the characteristic chrome moldings were dropped. However, the door handles, side moldings, stirrups moldings and side mirrors, now had a black matte finish, the window moldings disappear completely. Bumpers and headlight moldings from now were painted the color of the car. The colors and clothes inside were unchanged from the 1995 model year.

The second phase of the 1996 model year was characterized by the complete dropping of all moldings of the Vocho. Now there were two different versions available:

- Volkswagen Sedán City.- This was a budget version with all the equipment reduced to its minimum expression, disappearing from the equipment list elements such as: the door armrests, the automatic front seat belts, the rear seat belts, the front disc brakes, and the central bumper black stripe. This version was only available in Verona Red (from 1997 in Tornado Red) and Bright White. Its upholstery was new cloth with vinyl in Grey Frannel. One way to distinguish the Volkswagen Sedán City was that the City had no Sedan black sticker on its bumpers, which was the norm in the rest of the Volkswagen Beetles.
- Volkswagen Sedán Clásico.- This version kept all of the improvements implemented in 1995 to compensate for the loss of moldings, this model was equipped with grey hub caps in matt finish, black velour and black vinyl upholstery, four arm steering wheel (from the third generation Golf and Jetta) and the availability of more colors: Bright White, Tornado Red, Black, and optionally, the Tornasol Silver Metallic, Windsor Blue Metallic, Classic Green Pearl, Indian Red Pearl and Dusty Mauve Pearl (the latter only in 1996).

Derived from the Sedán Clásico went on sale in mid-1996, the Limited Edition Volkswagen Beetle Harlekin, inspired in the Golf Harlekin (sold in North American markets) and Polo Harlekin (sold in European markets). This Beetle was characterized by having different colors in the different body parts, as four different colors: Marine Blue, Green, Yellow and Red.

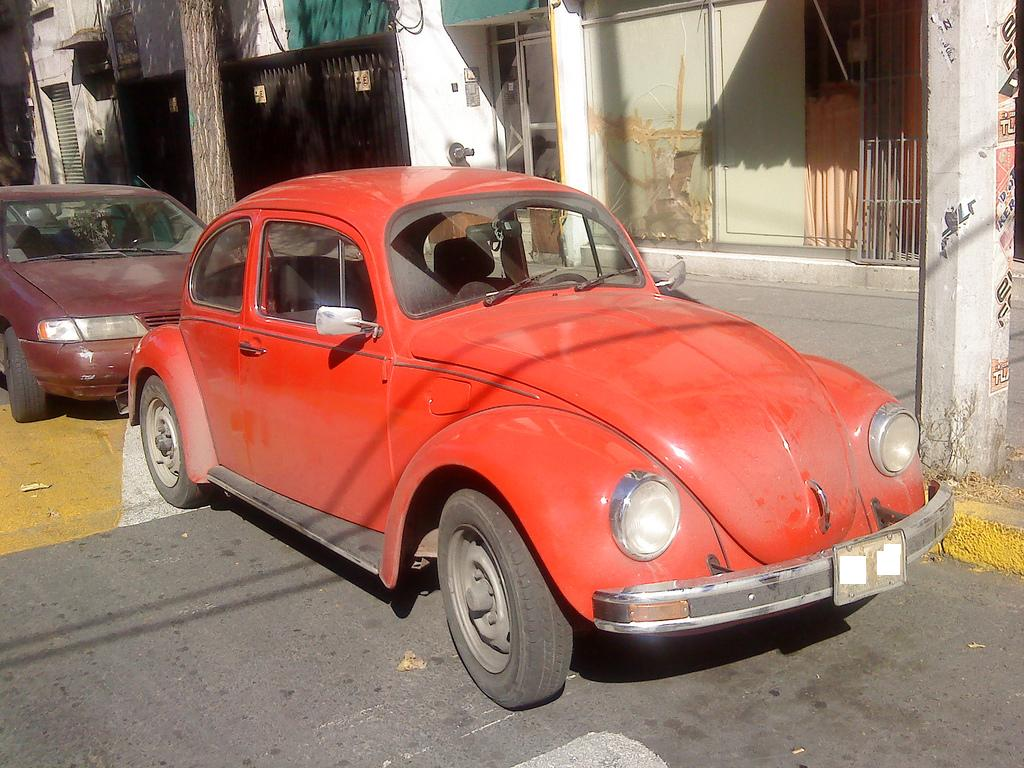
1995 Volkswagen Beetle. The last regular Volkswagen Beetle with chrome moldings.

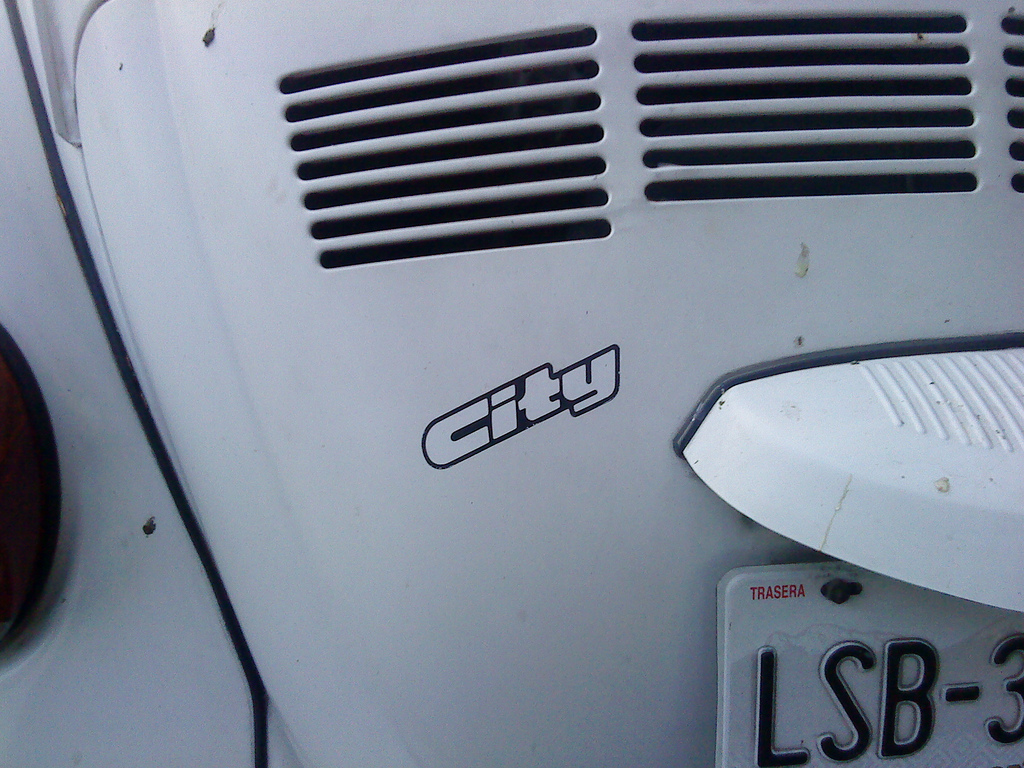
Volkswagen Sedán City badge. Used between 1996 and 1999.

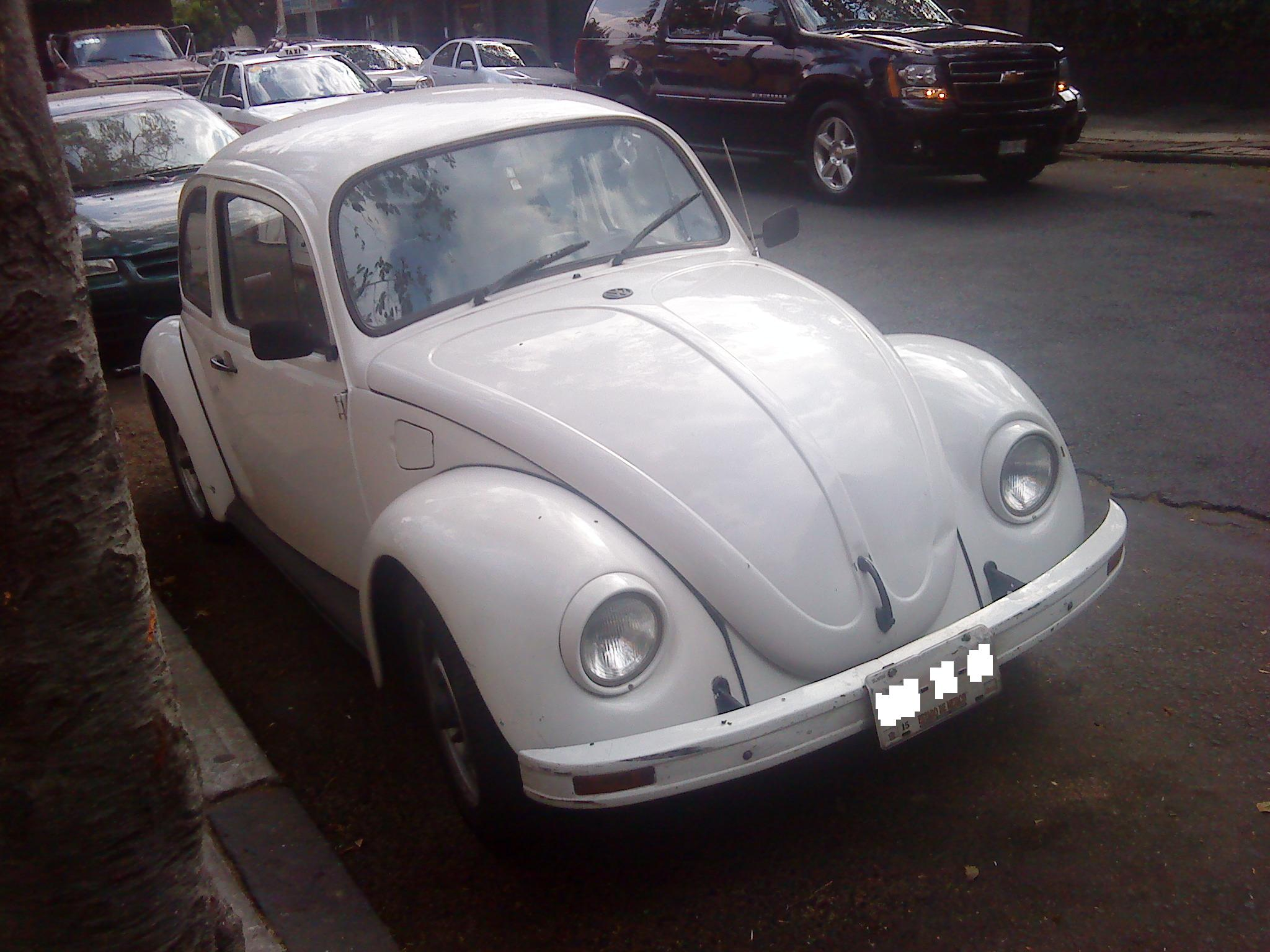
1996 Volkswagen Sedán City. Front view.

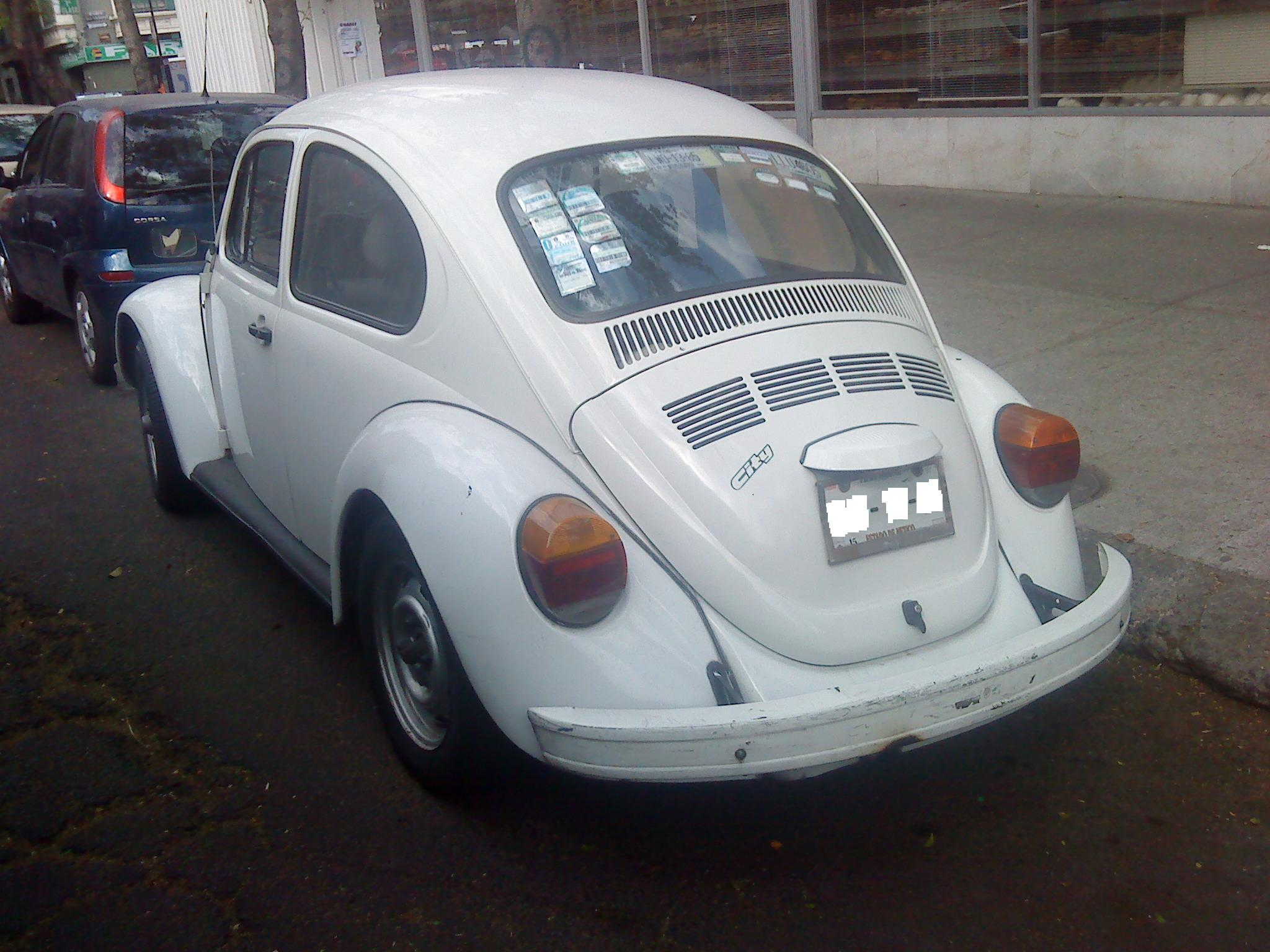
1996 Volkswagen Sedán City. Rear view.

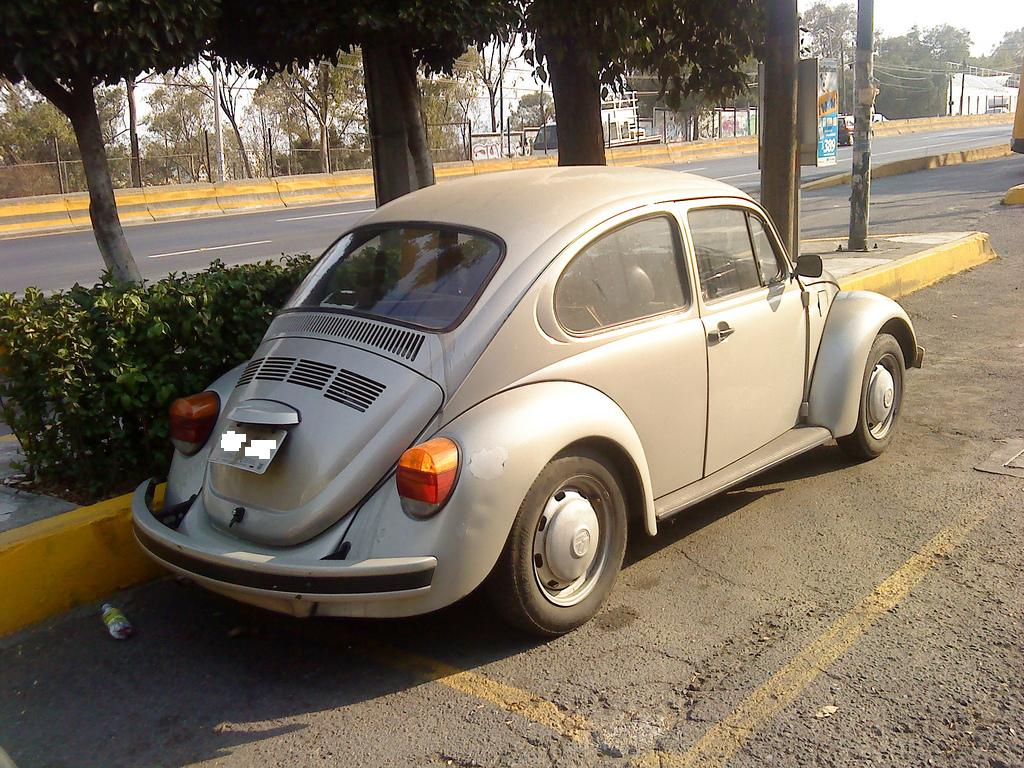
1996 Volkswagen Sedán Clásico.

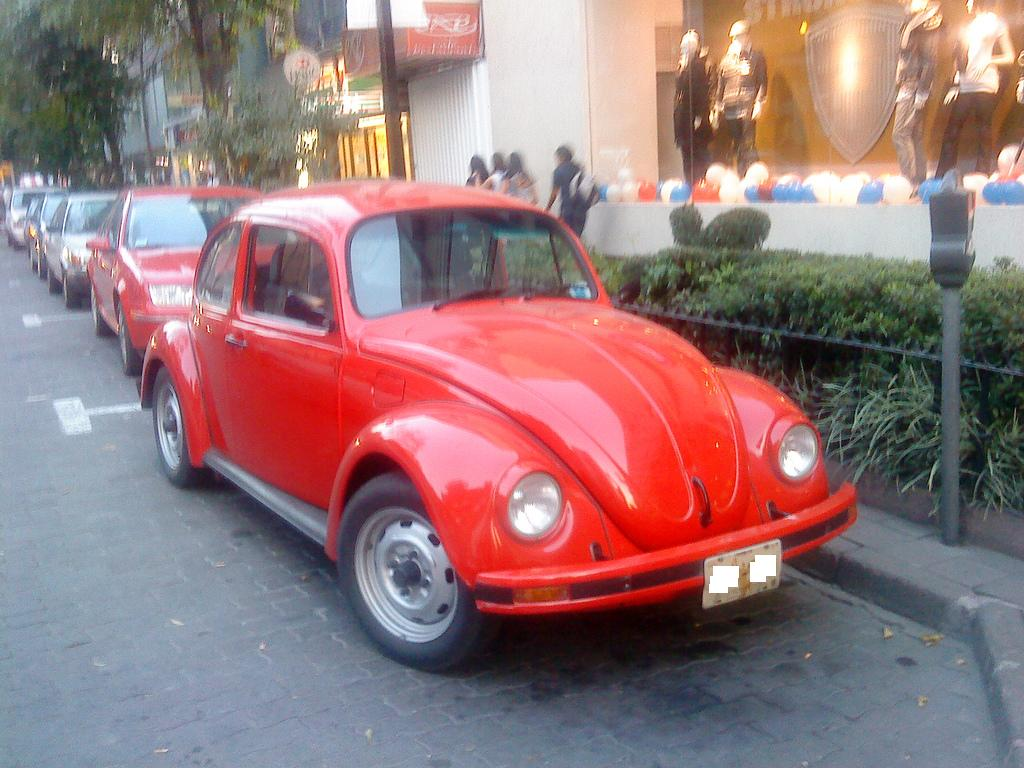
"Unified" 2002 Volkswagen Sedán. Front view.

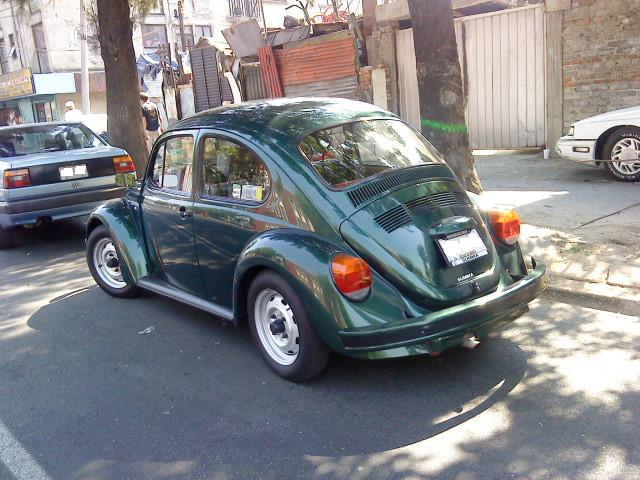
"Unified" 2003 Volkswagen Sedán. Rear view.

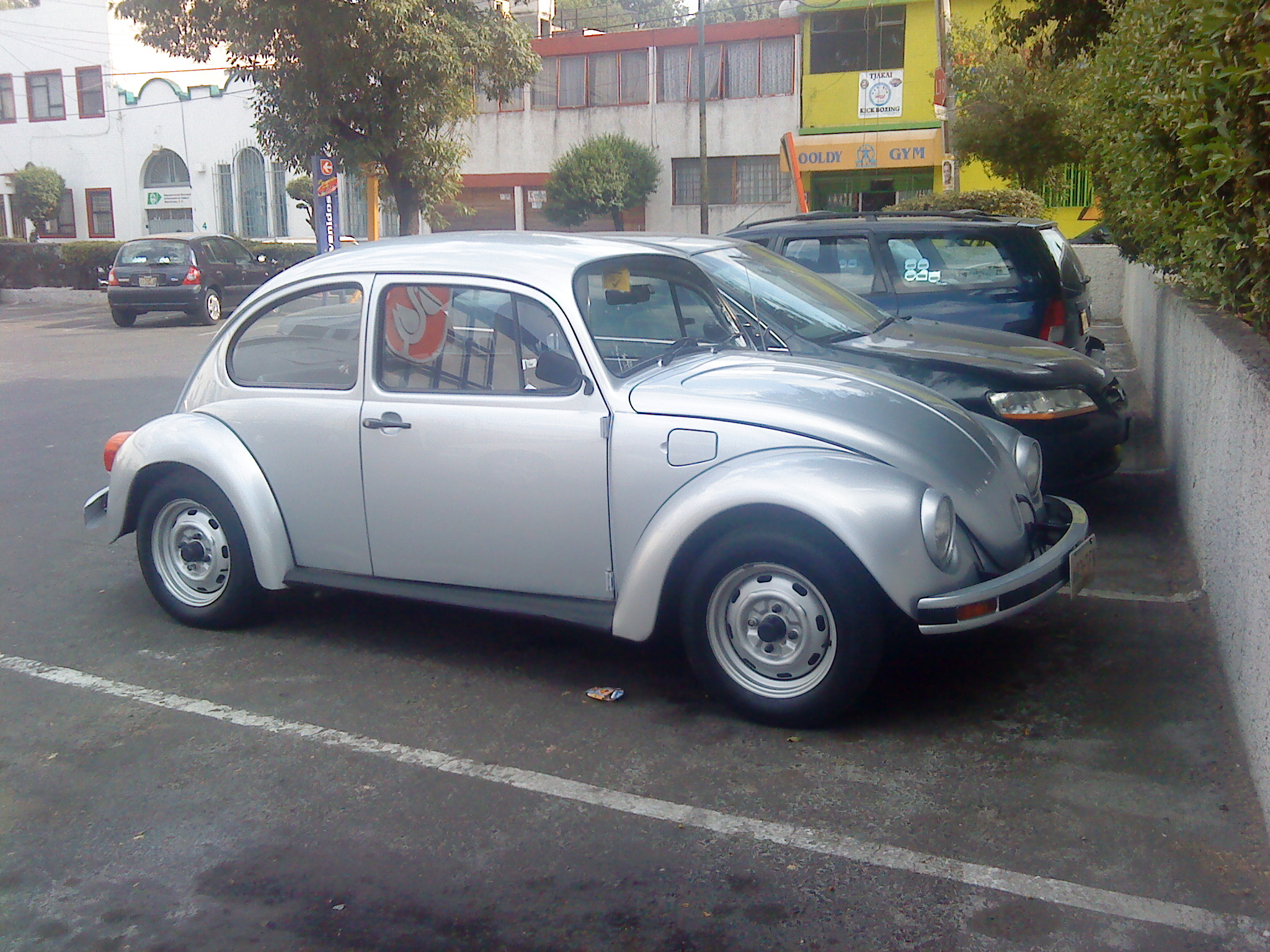
"Unified" 2003 Volkswagen Sedán. Side view.

In 1999, the same as in 1996, there were two different phases: In the first one, the Beetle kept being sold the same way as in previous years (Volkswagen Sedán City and Volkswagen Sedán Clásico), while in the second one, both versions were replaced by a new "unique" version, mostly referred to as the Volkswagen Sedán Unificado, which takes the City's upholstery, and the improvements and the metallic colors from the Sedán Clásico. This new Volkswagen Beetle was the last regular version which remained unchanged until 2003. This year appeared, in addition to the anti-theft alarm and with the intention of lowering the high index of thefts and therefore, the extraordinarily expensive premiums of insurance policies, the Transponder, a device with an entry located in the dashboard, which allows the ignition and operation of the car. When it was offline, the car cannot even be started when using the ignition key.

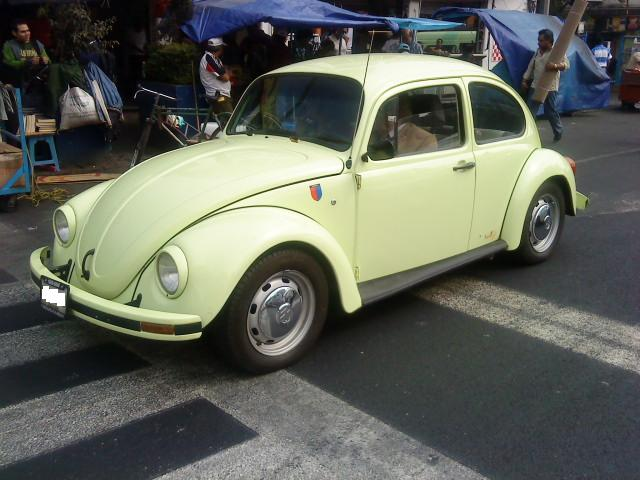
2002 Volkswagen Sedán Summer. Front view.

In 2000, to commemorate the new millennium, two new Limited Editions were launched:

- Volkswagen Sedán Clásico.- This new Limited Edition takes the moldings, mirrors and hubcaps with chrome finishings. Inside it had an anthracite coloured velour upholstery. The only color available was Indian Red Pearl. It had side "Clásico" anagrams.
- Volkswagen Sedán Jeans.- It was equipped with 15" alloy wheels, and it had a new indigo blue jean upholstery. It had side and rear "Jeans" anagrams. Its color was Batik Blue Pearl.

The 2001 model year saw new "tattoos" on windows, exterior mirrors and rear lights, in order to prevent the theft of these parts when the car was parked. These "tattoos" contains the last 8 alphanumeric characters that comprise the serial number of the car.

The 2002 model year saw one of the last limited editions was introduced, the Volkswagen Beetle Summer. This was characterized by two special colors: A new shade of yellow, and a new shade of blue original from the European Volkswagen Lupo. Its chrome wheel caps contrasted with its monochrome scheme. Like other editions, the Beetle Summer had rear and side Summer anagrams.

== Volkswagen Sedán Última Edición ==
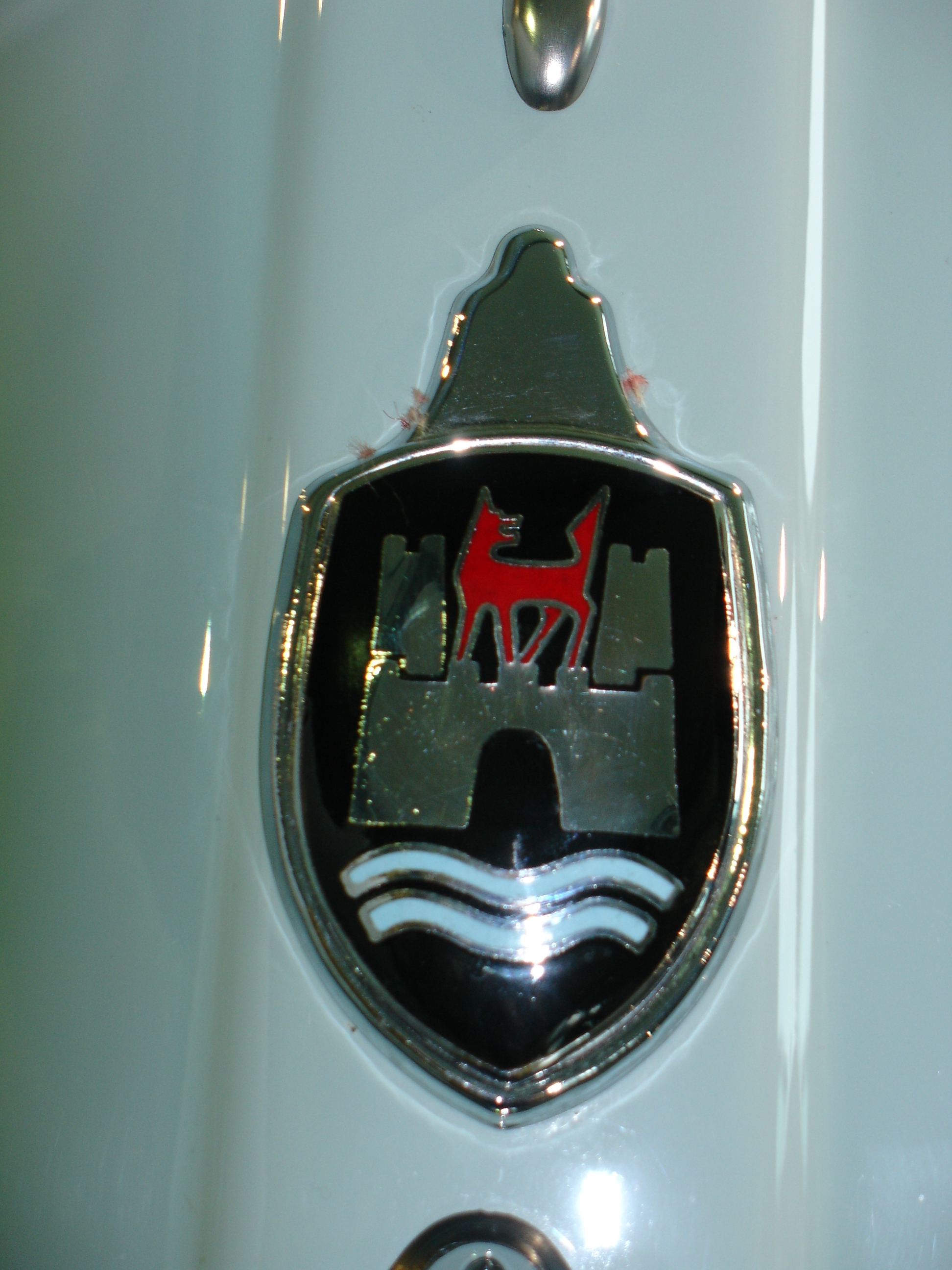
Emblem with the coat of arms of Wolfsburg located in the trunk's lid. This badge was present in older models, and it's back in the Volkswagen Sedán Última Edición.

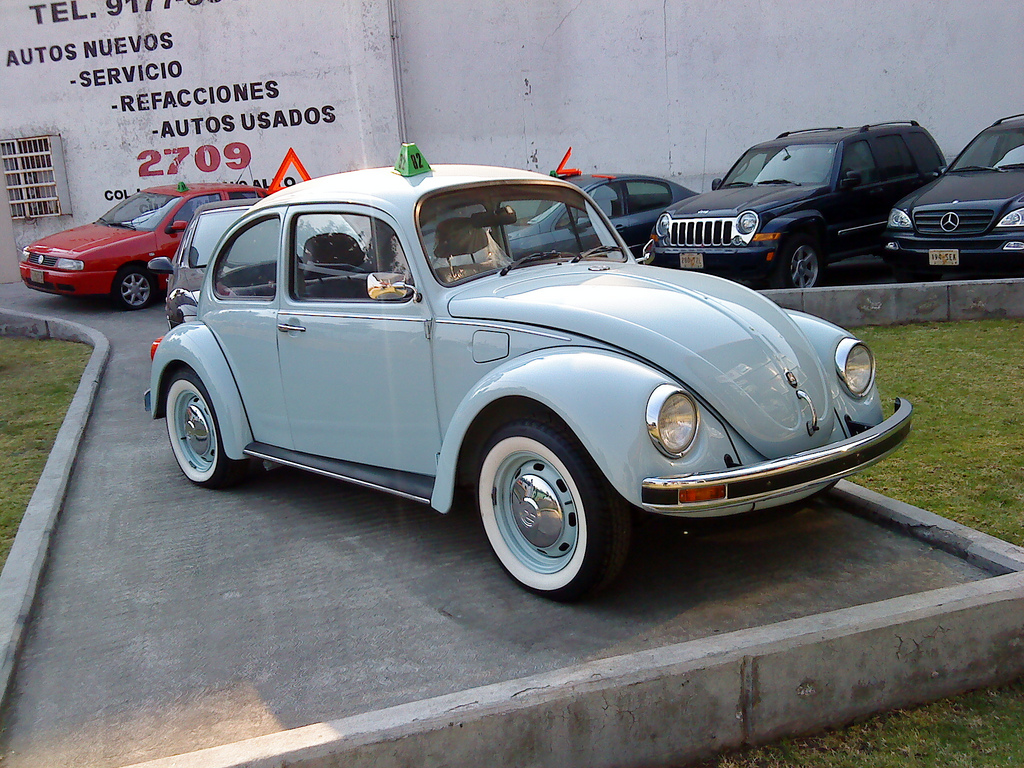
2004 Volkswagen Sedán Última Edición. Front view. Aquarius Blue with Grey interior.

In March 2003, the end of the Vocho production was announced, due to the gradual and continuous decline in demand for this model, which began with the introduction of the Chevrolet Pop (Opel Corsa B) in Mexico produced by General Motors in 1997. The Pop replaced the Volkswagen Beetle in its first place on sales in Mexico by offering modernity at a price just a little higher than the Vocho. However, the Volkswagen Beetle kept being the Mexican taxi driver favorite, until, in 2002, a decree emerged under the mandate of Andrés Manuel López Obrador, then Mexico City's governor. This decree prohibited the granting of permits for public transportation in the form of taxis in Mexico City to two-door cars, restricting even more the marketing of the Vocho in favor of the Nissan Tsuru (third generation Nissan Sentra), which now became the new favorite of taxi drivers in Mexico, causing sales of the Vocho to fall even further. These sales figures reached over 40,000 units sold annually in the mid-90s, dropping to just over 10,000 in its last year. Taxis were also not permitted to be any older than eight years, although the Vocho ended up being grandfathered in for an extra two years. This means that there will be no more Beetle taxis in Mexico City after the end of 2012. From 100,000 a few years earlier, only 3,500 VW Sedán taxis were left in early 2012.

It was in June 2003 that the Volkswagen Sedán Última Edición was introduced. A totally nostalgic car, which resembles the past glories of the Volkswagen Beetle. This Final Edition consisted of 2,999 units for sale to the general public in Volkswagen dealers across Mexico, while one (the last one to be produced), would be immediately shipped to the Volkswagen Museum in Wolfsburg, Germany, testifying a historic age which ended on July 30, 2003, when the last Volkswagen Beetle (the unit number 21'529,464) leaves the production line in what was now called "the hall of sorrow", accompanied by a Mariachi singing the song "Las Golondrinas" (A Mexican folk song that speaks of a farewell). This latter Beetle was headed to the port of Veracruz where a ship would take it to its final destination. The rest of the units, in spite of costing MXP$84,000 (a "Unified" Volkswagen Beetle cost MXN$69,000), moved very quickly from dealerships, leaving many people with the desire to own one of these copies unsatisfied. At this time, Volkswagen presented some advertising with a nostalgic tone. In some of them, they showed a small space to park, and many cars that tried unsuccessfully to occupy it, after what appeared to get a sedan, then showed a sentence saying: "Es increíble que un auto tan pequeño deje un vacío tan grande. Adiós Sedán." ("It is incredible that a car so small can leave such a large void. Goodbye Beetle"). One of the curious events that occurred was that a group of owners of dealerships, in Mexico, came together to buy one of these cars, which was sent to the Vatican City as a present for Pope John Paul II.

=== Special features ===
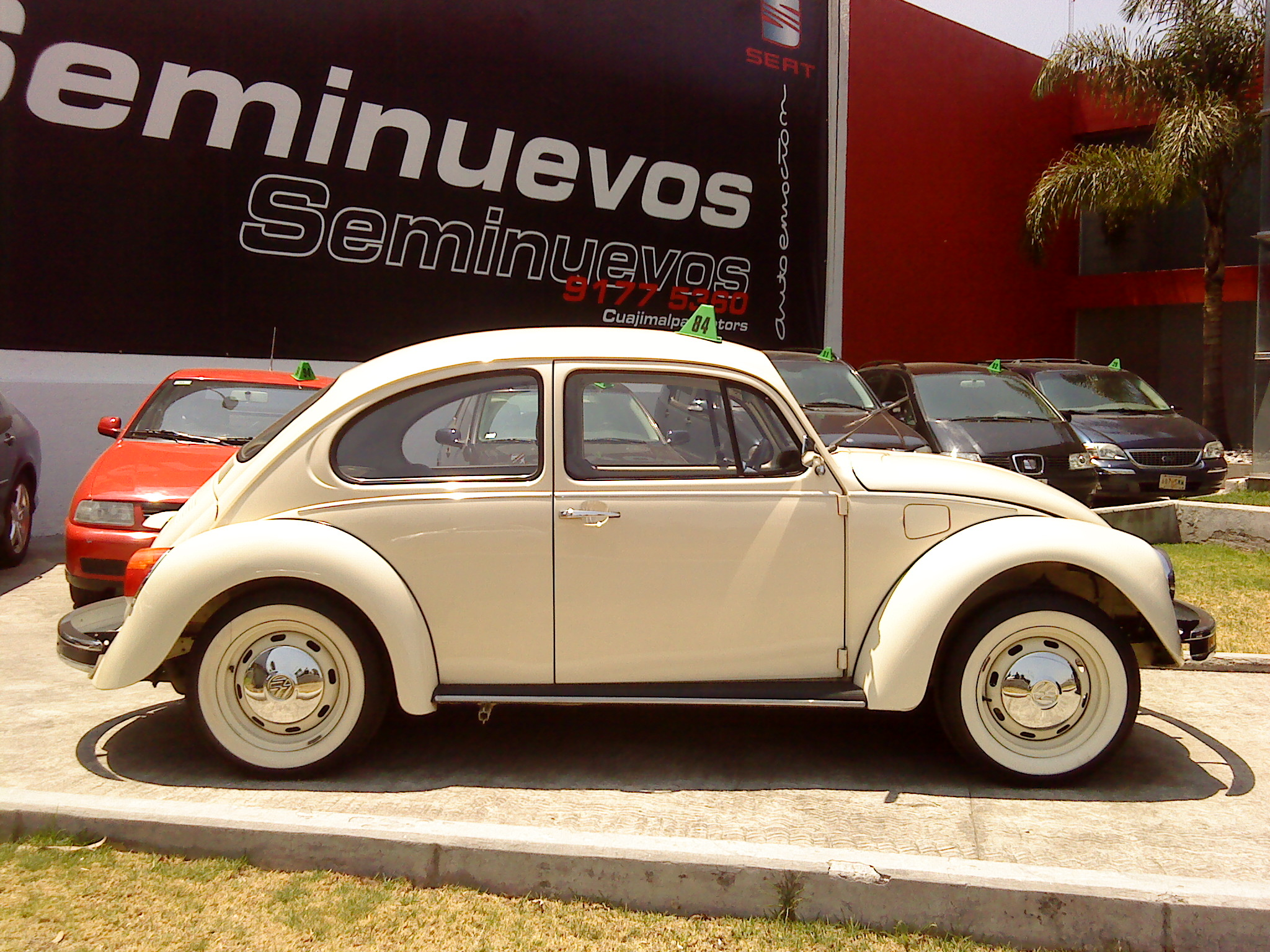
2004 Volkswagen Sedán Última Edición. Side view. Harvest Moon Beige with Black interior.

- Two different colour combinations:
  - Aquarius Blue with Franell Grey interior
  - Harvest Moon Beige with Black interior
- Mouldings, bumpers, wheel covers and door handles in chrome finishing
- 165/80 R 15 white wall radial tyres
- 5J × 15 body coloured stamped steel wheels
- Complete carpeting in passenger room
- AM/FM stereo CD player with four speakers and chromed antenna
- Two exterior chromed mirrors
- Specific noise isolation in passenger room
- Glovebox cover and dashboard inserts in body colour
- Carpeted lid for rear boot
- Carpeted front bonnet
- Special commemorative plaque on glove box cover
- Complete cloth upholstery
- Bags on front back seats
- Map's bag on driver's door
- Chromed VW logo on the top and emblem with the coat of arms of the City of Wolfsburg at the front bonnet lid
- Tail lights with chrome moulding

=== Additional notes ===
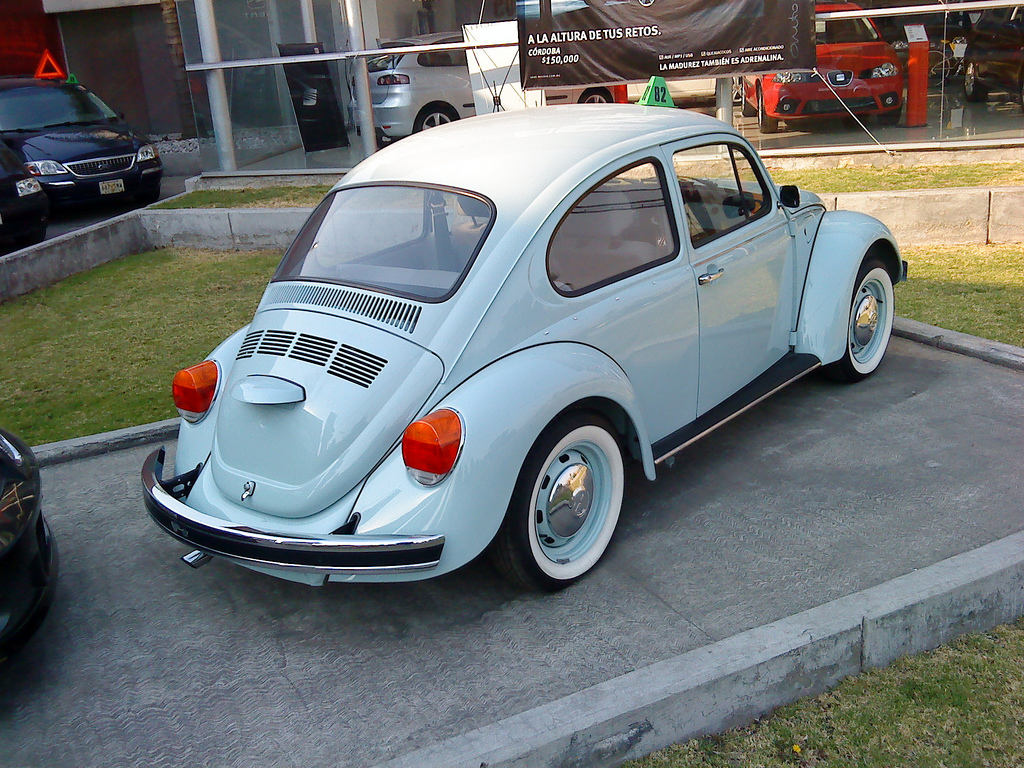
2004 Volkswagen Sedán Última Edición. Rear view. Aquarius Blue with Grey interior.

As the Volkswagen Sedán Última Edición rolled out from the production lines as a 2004 model, a limited number of "Unified" Beetles were also produced as a 2004 model. After the Last Edition Beetle ran out, the normal 2003 and 2004 Volkswagen Beetles continued being available in most Volkswagen dealerships in Mexico, during most of 2003. Some chose to "convert" their Vochos into Last-Edition replicas.

Several units of the Last Edition Beetle were exported from Mexico to, mainly, North America and Europe, where it had become a cult car. Today, a Volkswagen Sedan Última Edición, being the last representative of a lineage of more than 21 million units produced, has increased its value as a collector car at the international level, reaching figures of up to US$15,000 in resale.

In Germany an Última Edición' Owners Club was formed. Initially, the reason for finding such a club was that the owners faced difficulties with the registration of the car. A failing OBD was the main reason for no registration. Through a big lobby by applying pressure on politicians the cars were registered after some modifications. From then on the K-UE Club EV. organizes every year several events to preserve the legend of the last model and all its air-cooled predecessors. Also the exchange of knowledge to maintain the type is one of its tasks.

== See also ==
- Automotive industry in Mexico
