= Taxis of Mexico =

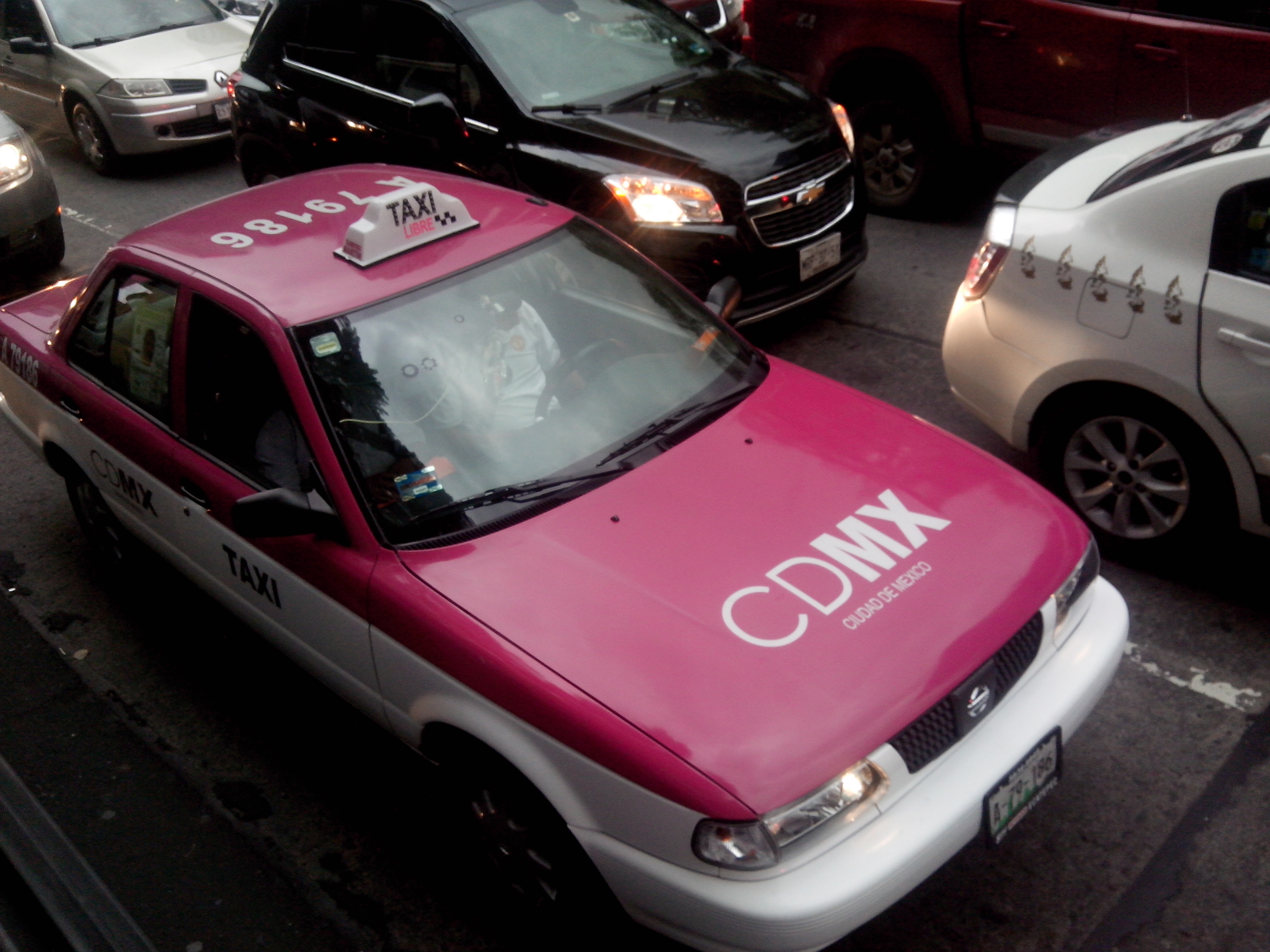
Taxi in Mexico City with the Mexican pink and white design in use since 2014

The taxicabs of Mexico are a common form of transportation in most cities of the country. Taxicabs in Mexico tend to have very low fares compared to that in more economically developed countries.

There are more than 140,000 taxicabs in Mexico City, making it one of the largest taxicab fleets in the world.

== History ==
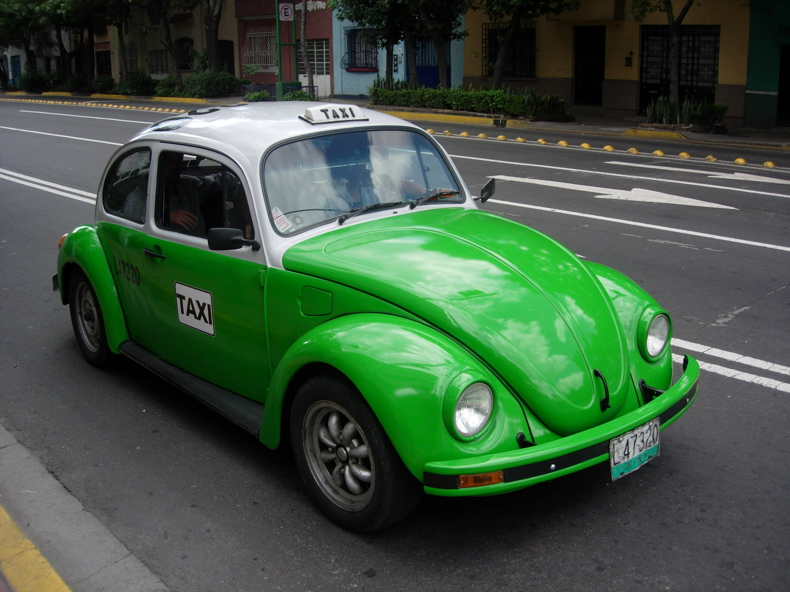
Mexican Volkswagen Beetle taxi

Modern taxicabs in the country had their origin in 1970 when the government took measures to give Mexico City an affordable taxi transport. Instead of the big cars used through the '50s and '60s, the Volkswagen Sedán (Beetle type 1) was the car selected to serve as taxicabs. They were colored with yellow panels and white roofs. During the late '70s, however, other automobiles started to run as taxis, such as the Nissan Tsuru and the Datsun 160J.

Sometime in the early '90s, government decided to change taxi and other public transport such as Peseros panel color to green, in order to give an impression of "eco transport", and the VWs started to be called "taxis ecológicos" (ecological taxis). Soon, very few yellow taxis were running by the city although it is still possible to see some of them occasionally - and a yellow color scheme is used by a private airport taxicab company "Yellow Cab" and another called "Sitio-300".

In 2003, the government decided to change the colors again - to a full white colored car with a red stripe on both sides of the panels. At the same time, the old 2-door VWs were retired and replaced with 4-door saloons or subcompacts such as the Nissan Platina, Hyundai Atos the most populous taxicab choice the Nissan Tsuru(1991-2017).

The colors changed again in 2008 this time to maroon with golden rooftops and a row of the city symbol, the Angel of Independence. in 2014 color changed again to Mexican pink and white by this time all the Volkswagen beetle taxis were not in service

However, there are no more Volkswagen beetle taxis anymore as the government does not allow for a taxicab to run after 8 years

== Regulation ==
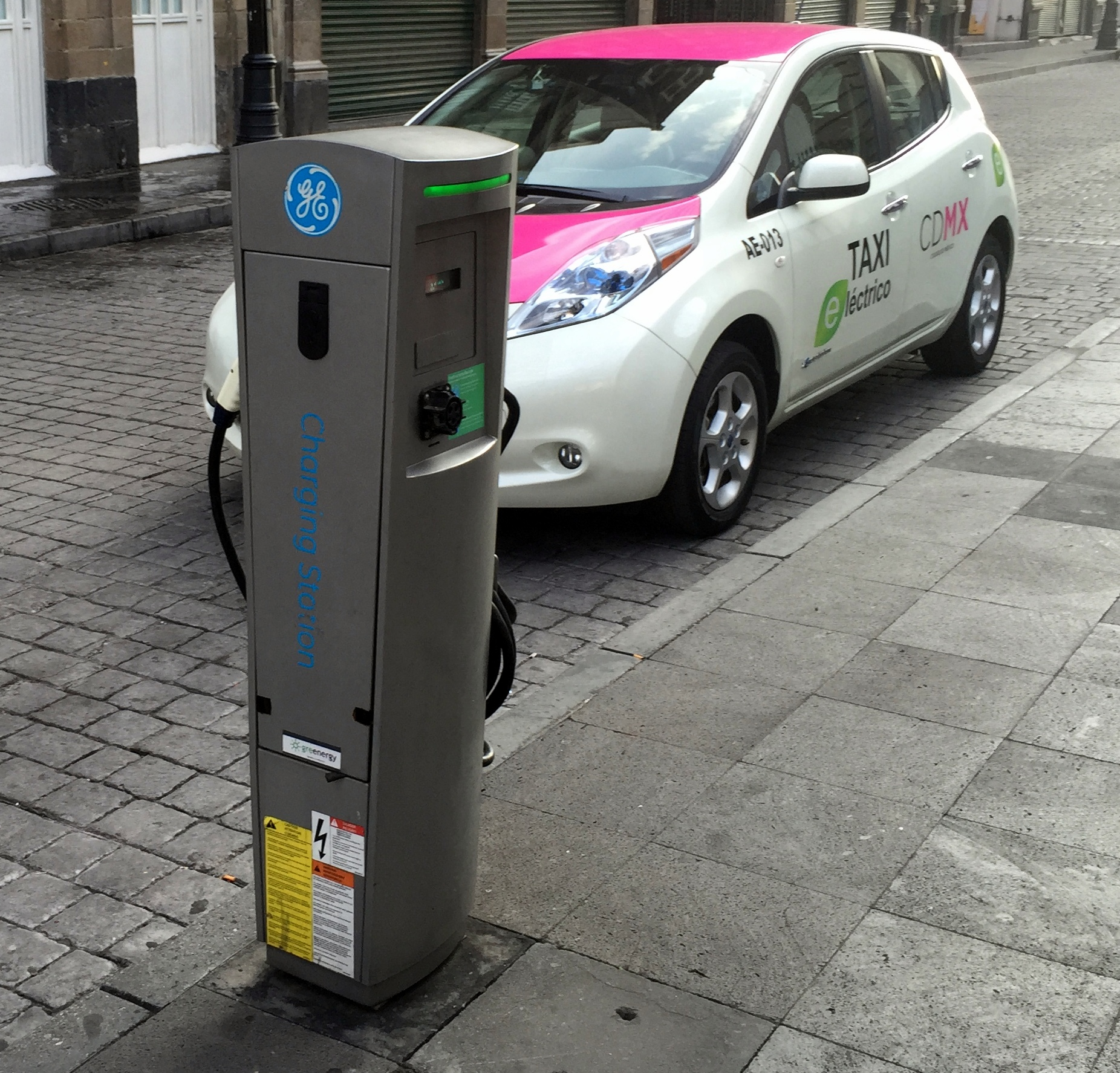
Electric taxi in Mexico City

In Mexico City, according to Mexican legislation introduced in 2001, public taxicabs (in contrast with private taxicabs, or 'taxis de sitio') must be 4-door red cars, with a white roof. Before 2001 most taxicabs were green Volkswagen Beetles with a white roof. They had the front-right seat removed in order to ease entry for passengers. Originally they were yellow with white roof, until they were changed in mid-90s (allegedly because of yellow color being the official color of the Partido de la Revolución Democrática who at the time was competing for the newly created position of Head of Government of the Federal District with the Partido Revolucionario Institucional which is mostly identified with the green. Officially it was to identify green taxicabs as environmentally-friendly 'ecológicos', but they are exactly the same polluting Volkswagen Beetles. As in most of the world a special license must be obtained in order to run a taxicab.

However, due to the increasing demand for public taxicabs, and the difficulties and cost of obtaining such license, there are many illegal 'pirata' taxis. These look like common taxis, but lack the legal and regulatory requirements to carry fare-paying passengers. Pirata taxis pose a higher security risk for passengers due to the lack of background checks for drivers, and can be distinguished because they carry a regular private vehicle licence plate (which is brown in the format XXX-YYY where X a number and Y a letter) or have a number drawn or printed in place of a licence plate instead of a taxicab licence plate (which is in the format LXXXXXX where X is a number). These pirate taxis are common throughout the city due to government's failure to enforce the regulations. Indeed, sanctions have been threatened by the trade unions, and others, should there be any clampdown on the illegal taxis.

== Cars which commonly serve as taxis in Mexico ==
=== Common service (with some exceptions) ===
- Chevrolet Chevy (Opel Corsa MkII)
- Chevrolet C2 (Facelifted Corsa MkII)
- Hyundai Atos
- Nissan Platina
- Nissan Tsuru(Sentra B13)
- Pontiac G2
- Volkswagen Gol

=== Electric taxis ===
- Nissan Leaf (Mexico City and Aguascalientes)

=== Radio taxi service (some taxi stands, VIP service and airport taxis) ===
- Nissan Sentra
- Chevrolet Suburban
- Dodge Neon
- Dodge Stratus
- Ford Contour
- Mercury Grand Marquis
- Volkswagen Jetta

=== Retired from service ===
- Volkswagen Sedán

== Trivia ==
Matchbox launched in 2004 a 1:64 scale model of the Volkswagen sedan taxi, released as "Beetle taxi".

== See also ==
- Volkswagen Beetle in Mexico
