= Mastretta Unidiseño =

Mastretta MXA/MXB

Overview
- Manufacturer: Mastretta
- Production: 1994–2000
- Assembly: Mexico: Mexico City
- Designer: Daniel Mastretta

Body and chassis
- Class: MR Kit-car Coupé
- Body style: 2-door Coupé
- Related: Volkswagen Beetle

Powertrain
- Engine: 1585i H4, 45 bhp (34 kW; 46 PS)
- Transmission: 4-speed Manual transmission

Dimensions
- Length: 4,300 mm (169.3 in)
- Width: 1,700 mm (66.9 in)
- Height: 1,390 mm (54.7 in)
- Curb weight: 900 kg (1,984 lb)

Chronology
- Successor: Mastretta MXT

The Mastretta Unediseño (previously Unediseño Mastretta) was a kit-car coupé designed and manufactured by Mexican kit-car manufacturer Mastretta.

== History ==
Unediseño was created around 1991 by Daniel Mastretta, Mexican designer and his brother Carlos and usually manufactures metropolitan peseros and buses. However, Mastretta was interested in the world of kit-cars so he created his own car. He took the chassis of the popular Volkswagen Beetle and made a fibreglass body, with a similar design to that of the Chevrolet Corvette and the Ferrari 360.

Despite the sportive car image, the engine remained the same 44 bhp (33 kW; 45 PS) of the Beetle so the top speed of this car is 145 km/h (90 mph). This is the only car produced by Unediseño and was sold in Germany and in the United States.

Engine
Displacement	CC	Power	Top Speed	0–100 km/h (0-62 mph) (s)
1.6i	1598 cc	44 hp (33 kW)	145 km/h (90 mph)	15.0

== Mastretta ==
Following the creation of the Mastretta MXT serial-production project, the previous Unediseño cars are now called Mastretta MXA and Mastretta MXB. Then, the Mastretta Unediseño may be considered Unediseño's first car, and the MXT, Mastretta's first car although they remain the same maker.

== See also ==
- Volkswagen Beetle
