= Alberto Broggi =

Italian computer scientist (born 1966)

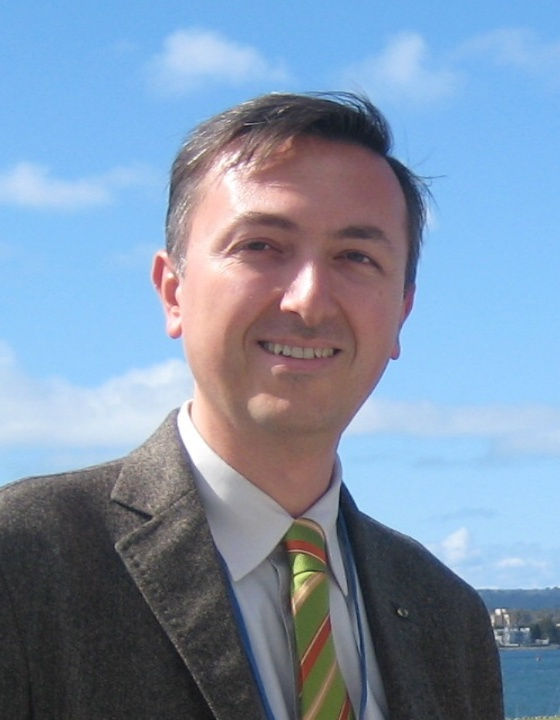
- Broggi in 2010
- Born: December 1, 1966 (age 59); Parma, Italy
- Awards: IEEE Medal for Environmental and Safety Technologies (2017)
- Scientific career
- Fields: Robotics and computer vision
- Workplaces: University of Parma, VisLab

Alberto Broggi is General Manager at VisLab srl (spinoff of the University of Parma acquired by Silicon-Valley company Ambarella Inc. in June 2015) and a former professor of Computer Engineering at the University of Parma in Italy.

Broggi's research has focused on vision-based perception systems for vehicles, including autonomous navigation, advanced driver assistance systems, and intelligent vehicles. His work contributed to several milestones in autonomous vehicle development, from early road experiments in the 1990s to participation in international autonomous driving competitions and large-scale real-world demonstrations.

== Early programming activities ==
Before beginning his academic career in computer vision and autonomous vehicles, Broggi developed software and video games for the ZX Spectrum home computer during the 1980s. Several of his games were commercially released in Italy, including Bug Zum, Red Cap, Alo Bao, Zap-Lap, Hal Ant, and Ini-Rip.

His early ZX Spectrum software activity is also documented in Spectrumpedia, an encyclopedia dedicated to the ZX Spectrum, in its section on Italian software authors.

== Research in computer vision, hardware, and AV ==
Broggi's research activities started in 1991–1994. His group together with the Dipartimento di Elettronica, Politecnico di Torino, Italy, built their own hardware architecture (named PAPRICA, for PArallel PRocessor for Image Checking and Analysis, based on 256 single-bit processing elements working in SIMD fashion) and installed it on board of a mobile laboratory (Mob-Lab) to develop and test some initial concepts in the field of intelligent vehicles.

In 1996, Broggi's group worked to develop a real vehicle prototype (named ARGO, a Lancia Thema passenger car which was equipped with vision sensors, processing systems, and vehicle actuators) and developed the necessary software and hardware that made it able to drive autonomously on standard roads.

Broggi's research group (called VisLab from then on) gathered all their findings in a book, which was then also translated in Chinese.

When Broggi was with the University of Pavia, his research was extended and applied to extreme conditions (automatic driving on snow and ice): in 2001, VisLab led the research effort of providing a vehicle (RAS, Robot Antartico di Superficie) with sensing capabilities so that it was able to automatically follow the vehicle in front.

In 2004 and 2005 VisLab took part in the DARPA Grand Challenge as part of Team TerraMax, providing the vision-based perception system of the TerraMax autonomous truck built by Oshkosh Truck. In 2005 TerraMax was one of the five vehicles that completed the 132-mile (212 km) desert course. In 2007 Broggi's group again participated with TerraMax in the DARPA Urban Challenge, where Team Oshkosh was one of the eleven teams selected for the final event.

In 2008 Broggi was awarded an ERC Advanced Grant for the project OFAV – Open intelligent systems for Future Autonomous Vehicles (grant agreement 228045), hosted by the University of Parma, with an EU contribution of about €1.75 million from 1 December 2008 to 30 November 2013. The VIAC expedition was carried out within this project.

In 2010 Broggi's group embarked on driving 4 vehicles autonomously from Italy to China with no human intervention. This challenge is called VIAC, for VisLab Intercontinental Autonomous Challenge . Soon after this, Broggi was awarded a second ERC grant (Proof of concept) to industrialize some of the results obtained and successfully tested on the VIAC vehicles.

On July 12, 2013, VisLab tested the BRAiVE vehicle in downtown Parma, negotiating two-way narrow rural roads, pedestrian crossings, traffic lights, artificial bumps, pedestrian areas, and tight roundabouts. The vehicle traveled from Parma University Campus up to Piazza della Pilotta (downtown Parma): a 20 minutes run in a real environment, together with real traffic at 11am on a working day, that required absolutely no human intervention. Part of this test was driven with nobody in the driver seat, for the first time ever on public roads.

== Awards and recognition ==
In 2017, Broggi received the IEEE Medal for Environmental and Safety Technologies, one of the highest recognitions awarded by the Institute of Electrical and Electronics Engineers (IEEE), with the citation: "For leadership in vehicular environmental perception, and for setting worldwide milestones in safe and reliable intelligent vehicles."

In 2018, Popular Mechanics included the US patent US 8,139,109 B2, titled Vision system for an autonomous vehicle, co-invented by Alberto Broggi, Gary Schmiedel, and Christopher K. Yakes, in its list 15 Patents That Changed the World, highlighting patents that had a significant impact on technological development.
