= Rhonda Software =

American camera software and hardware design company

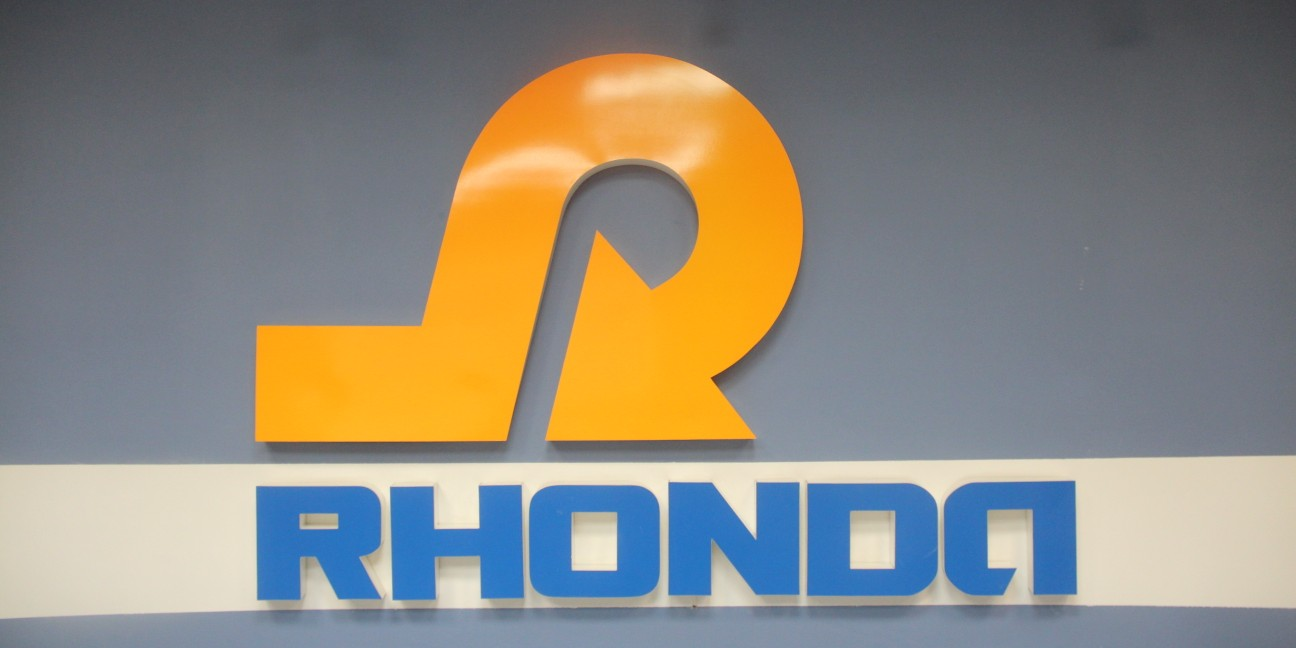
- Company type: Private
- Industry: Camera hardware and software technologies in automotive, robotics, security, IoT and other civilian industries
- Founded: December 13, 1995
- Headquarters: Chicago, United States
- Products: System on a Module; Hardware Design; Embedded Software
- Services: Custom Camera Development; System on a Module Customization
- Number of employees: 140
- Website: rhondasoftware.com

Rhonda Software is a privately held camera software and hardware design company that produces embedded solutions in the areas of digital image processing, multimedia and connectivity. Rhonda software is used in surveillance applications, action cameras, virtual reality cameras, wearable video recorders, drone cameras, automotive and robotic vision systems and other camera applications.

As of 2022, the company has over 100 engineers, headquartered in the United States (Chicago) with main development office in Kazakhstan (Almaty).

== History ==
The company was founded in 1995 as a provider of software outsourcing services. In 2004, Rhonda was certified as a SEI CMM level 4. Since 2007 the company has been doing R&D in the area of computer vision. In 2011, Rhonda introduced its first computer vision solutions myAudience-Count and myAudience-Measure - audience count and classification tools.

Since 2014, Rhonda Software is a camera design partner of Ambarella, Inc. The company demonstrated its H22 SoM with a camera demo design at the CES 2020 Expo and participated in the Embedded World 2020 Expo in the same year. A cooperation with VisionLabs engineers allowed to use their face recognition algorithm in order to execute DNN inference and train the network onboard. In 2021, Rhonda Software established a partnership with Brodmann17 and launched an ADAS camera platform based on Ambarella CV25 edge AI vision System on a Chip.
