= Top Gear series 19 =

Top Gear
- Series 19
- Promotional poster
- Starring: Jeremy Clarkson; Richard Hammond; James May; The Stig
- No. of episodes: 7

Release
- Original network: BBC Two; BBC HD
- Original release: 27 January – 10 March 2013

Series chronology
- ← Previous; Series 18 Next → Series 20

Series 19 of Top Gear, a British motoring magazine and factual television programme, was broadcast in the United Kingdom on BBC Two and BBC HD during 2013, consisting of five episodes between 29 January and 24 February, and a two-part feature-length special involving a road trip in Africa, titled "Africa Special", aired on 3–10 March. This series' highlights included the presenters race from London to Milan, a supercar road trip across California, and the creation of a home-made car for the elderly. The nineteenth series received criticism for one of its episodes' early filming featuring Jeremy Clarkson seeming to use a racial slur during a car review film.

== Episodes ==
| No. overall | No. in series | Reviews | Features/challenges | Guest(s) | Original release date | UK viewers (millions) |
|---|---|---|---|---|---|---|
| 148 | 1 | Pagani Huayra • Bentley Continental GT Speed | Take the Bentley Continental GT Speed to a Welsh Rally stage. • Build a car smaller than a Peel P50 (Clarkson's "P45") | Damian Lewis • Kris Meeke • The Cast of Dragons' Den (Theo Paphitis • Duncan Bannatyne • Peter Jones • Deborah Meaden) | 27 January 2013 | 6.65 (Note: 5.47 million on BBC Two, 1.18 million on BBC HD) |
Hammond tests out the latest supercar from Italy, the Pagani Huayra, at the Track, while May takes to a Welsh stage of the World Rally Championship with the new Bentley Continental GT Speed, to see if it can be faster than one of the WRC cars (with the help of Kris Meeke behind the wheel). Elsewhere, Clarkson builds a smaller car than the Peel P50, the P45, and sees how good it is before putting before the 'Dragon' of Dragons' Den, and Damian Lewis takes his turn in the Kia Cee'd, around a snowy test track.
| 149 | 2 | None | Supercar road trip from Las Vegas, Nevada to Calexico, California: (Lexus LFA • SRT Viper • Aston Martin Vanquish) | Mick Fleetwood | 3 February 2013 | 6.42 (Note: 5.02 million on BBC Two, 1.4 million on BBC HD.) |
The trio head out for a road trip across Nevada and California, each taking with them a supercar they think is the best – Clarkson believes it is the Lexus LFA, May roots for the new Aston Martin Vanquish, and Hammond seeks to show it is the SRT Viper. Starting from the Valley of Fire, the trio visit Las Vegas and the Las Vegas Motor Speedway to race their cars in drag races organised by the Las Vegas Metropolitan Police Department, visit the Civic Musical Road, play an aerial version of Laser Quest at the Willow Springs International Motorsports Park, and head for Los Angeles where they get into trouble while doing "elevens" and "donuts" at the Sepulveda Dam. The trio conclude their trip with a race from Palm Springs to Calexico at the Mexican border, with the last presenter to arrive having to cross the border and review the country's first supercar for a later episode. Elsewhere Mick Fleetwood of Fleetwood Mac is the latest star to drive the Kia around the track.
| 150 | 3 | Toyota GT86 / Subaru BRZ • Shelby Mustang GT500 | Epic race from Wembley to the San Siro stadium in Milan: Shelby Mustang GT500 vs. the pan-European rail network | Amy Macdonald | 10 February 2013 | 6.36 (Note: 5.01 million on BBC Two, 1.35 million on BBC HD.) |
The producers have reserved a single ticket to a Champions League football match in Milan, Northern Italy where AC Milan are playing against Anderlecht, so the trio see who get it first by racing from the Wembley Stadium in London to the San Siro in Milan, although this time, the car may have a real challenge, as given that ten years have passed since the last race, trains have gotten much faster and Channel crossings have gotten slower. While Hammond and May opt to work together until Milan and then compete against each other towards the finish line, Clarkson, who is told he must not choose an expensive, high performance car for the race, tries to see if he can beat them in the Shelby Mustang GT500, a car named after Carroll Shelby, who was able to see the new Mustang before his death. Meanwhile, at the Track, Clarkson tests out how good a sports car the Toyota GT86 is, and Amy Macdonald drives the Kia Cee'd around the test track. Note: Top Gear paid tribute to Carroll Shelby during its 'Epic Race to Milan' film with a small scene covering their early life and involvement in car manufacturing.
| 151 | 4 | Mastretta MXT • Kia Cee'd • Hot hatchbacks: (Ford Focus ST • Renault Megane RenaultSport Cup 265 • Vauxhall Astra VXR) | Rugby match with Kia Cee'ds at Twickenham | Lewis Hamilton • Matt LeBlanc • Eric Clapton • Bruce Willis | 17 February 2013 | 5.39 (Note: 3.92 million on BBC Two, 1.39 million on BBC HD.) |
A trio of hot hatches hit the track with Clarkson seeing which is best – the Vauxhall Astra VXR, the Ford Focus ST and the Renault Megane RenaultSport Cup 265 Meanwhile, the presenter who got sent to Mexico (Hammond) reviews the country's first sports car, the Mastretta MXT, Clarkson tests out the new Kia Cee'd in a variety of tests before competing against May in a game of "Car Rugby" at Twickenham Stadium, and Lewis Hamilton is back to see if he can be faster in the old Liana.
| 152 | 5 | Range Rover | Design a vehicle for the elderly ("Rover James"/Fiat Multipla) • Range Rover vs an autonomous military machine | James McAvoy | 24 February 2013 | 6.45 (Note: 5.00 million on BBC Two, 1.45 million on BBC HD.) |
Clarkson and Hammond believe that elderly people would be better on the road if they had a car designed especially for them, so the pair make one out of a Fiat Multipla with many things that an elderly driver will like, before testing how well their creation fares by taking it to Christchurch, Dorset, and borrowing a few elderly ladies to tell them what they think. Meanwhile, May tests out the new Range Rover in London, before heading to the Nevada Automotive Test Centre in Nevada, to see how good it is off-road in a 10 miles (16 kilometres) race against an autonomous military machine, the TerraMax, and James McAvoy drives around the track as the latest star in the Kia Cee'd. Note: Top Gear paid respect to comedian and actor Richard Briers, for his help in the 'Making a Car for Elderly People' film, prior to his death a week before the episode's broadcast.
| 153 | 6 | N/A – Africa Special: Part 1 | Find source of the Nile: (BMW 528i Touring • Subaru Impreza WRX Estate • Volvo 850R Estate) | None | 3 March 2013 | 7.33 (Note: 5.85 million on BBC Two, 1.48 million on BBC HD.) |
In a two-part special in Africa, the presenters attempt to find the source of the River Nile, aided by second-hand estate cars bought on a budget of £1,500 – Clarkson uses a BMW 528i Touring, Hammond drives a Subaru Impreza WRX Estate, and May purchases a Volvo 850R Estate. In the first part, the trio journey Lake Victoria, which Victorian Explorers thought was the source of the Nile, to Lake Edward, which the trio believe the source is to be found around. On their journey, they visit Entebbe Airport, deal with heavy traffic in Uganda's capital of Kampala, and deal with rough roads, before converting their cars into mobile homes for the remainder of their trip. However, when their original theory is proven incorrect, they soon find themselves heading for Tanzania and the Serengeti, on a new theory the source is to be found there.
| 154 | 7 | N/A – Africa Special: Part 2 | Find source of the Nile: (BMW 528i Touring • Subaru Impreza WRX Estate • Volvo 850R Estate) | None | 10 March 2013 | 7.48 (Note: 5.89 million on BBC Two, 1.59 million on BBC HD.) |
The trio continue their search for the source of the River Nile, believing it to be in Tanzania. In the second part, the presenters face muddy tracks and rough dirt roads, view stunning scenery, take parts from each other's car to repair damage to their own, attempt to cross a river on a home-made ferry, and tackle a car-killing road on the Serengeti. As they near where the source is and set off after making camp for the final time, their journey soon devolves into a race to see which of the three can track down and find the source. Note: In homage to David Livingstone, the surnames of all credited presenters and crew members are accompanied with the famous quote ""Dr. ...., I Presume?", with music from the opening theme of Zulu (1964 film) playing throughout the closing credits.

== Criticism ==
Following accusations of racism made against Jeremy Clarkson for use of "Slope" comment in the Burma Special, an examination of his review of the Toyota GT86 and the Subaru BRZ in the nineteenth series revealed further criticism of racism. British newspaper The Daily Mirror revealed video evidence that in his reviews, in which he had used the rhyme eeny meeny miny moe for choosing the cars, one of the earlier takes of the scene featured him mumbling the word "nigger", which was historically a part of the rhyme's earlier versions; the actual transmitted scene used the word "teacher" instead of the racial epithet.

Clarkson initially denied the incident, but eventually issued an apology following the evidence's appearance. In his apology, he stated that he was "extremely keen" to avoid using the word, and that he had to do three takes with the film, adding that he was "mortified" that he appeared to actually mumble the word and that he did everything he could to avoid it being transmitted on the show. He further proved this was the case with a note he sent to the production office, which read:

"I didn't use the N-word here but I've just listened through my headphones and it sounds like I did. Is there another take that we could use?",

This incident was one of two reasons that led to the BBC ultimately giving Clarkson a "final warning" in regards to the corporation's views on racist remarks.

== Notes ==
The viewing figures shown in the Episode Table above, are a combination of the figures from the BBC Two broadcast and the BBC HD broadcast.
