= List of Ambarella products =

This list contains general information about computer system on chips (SOCs) developed by Ambarella.

== System on chips ==
Launch Date	Product	Fab (nm)	Variants	μarch	Cores	Applications	References
2005	A1	130 nm				Harmonic HDTV Broadcast Encoder	
2007	A2	90 nm				Samsung HD Camcorder; Bosch IP Cameras	
2008	A3		A350; A380; A390				
2009	A5	45 nm	A530; A550; A570; A5S	ARM 1136	1	Maximus Doorbell; Axis IP Cameras	
2010	A6						
2010	A7	32 nm	A7L; A7L-A; A7LW; A7LS	ARM11	1	GoPro Hero3 Black; Xiaomi Yi	
2013	A9	32 nm	A9AQ; A9-A1-RH	Cortex A9	2	Cameras: Gentex automotive camera; Z E1 camera; Xiaomi YI 4K (A9SE); Drones: DJI Mavic Pro	
2015	A12	28 nm	A12A; A12S; A12W	Cortex A9	1	Snap Spectacles; Xiaomi Mi Panoramic; SJCAM SJ7 Star; LAMAX X10; NextBase 422GW; OXIANG OX-ZP906G; Thinkware F100; Insta360 GO	
2012	S2	28 nm	S2L; S2LM	Cortex A9	1	Ubiquiti UniFi G3 IP Cam Series	
2014	S3	28 nm	S3L; S3LM	Cortex A9	1	Hikvision camera	
2016	S5	14 nm	S5L	Cortex A53	4	IntelliVision face recognition	
2019	S6	10 nm	S6LM	Cortex A53	4		
2015	H1			Cortex A9	2	Drones: DJI Phantom 4 Pro	
2016	H2	14 nm		Cortex A53	4	Xiaomi YI 4K+; DJI Osmo Action	
2016	H12			Cortex A9	1		
2017	H22	14 nm		Cortex A53	4	Cameras: NextBase 622GW; SJCAM SJ8 Pro; Capture Pocket; Vantop 6S; Caddx Peanut; Insta360 GO 2; Insta360 GO 3; Insta360 One RS; Insta360 One X; Insta360 One X2; Insta360 X3; Firefly X Lite II; VAVA VA-VD009; Thinkware U1000 4K; DJI Pocket 2; Amazon Ring Car Cam; OXIANG OX-ZP516P, OX-ZP522, OX-ZP522G, OX-ZP526 4G and OX-ZP529; Mevo Core; Drones: DJI Mavic Mini; DJI Mini 2; Hubsan Zino 2; Hubsan Zino 2 Plus	
2017	H3			Cortex A53	4		
	H32	10 nm		Cortex A53	4		
2017	B6						
2018	CV1	14 nm					
2018	CV2	10 nm	CV2S; CV2FS; CV2AQ	Cortex A53	4		
2018	CV22	10 nm	CV22S; CV22FS; CV22AQ	Cortex A53	4	Hella automotive camera	
2019	CV25	10 nm	CV25S; CV25AQ	Cortex A53	4	Yandex SignalQ2 LTE	
2021	CV5	5 nm	CV5A; CV5S	Cortex A76	2		
2021	CV52	5nm	CV52; CV52S	Cortex A76	2	Consumer (CV52) Security camera (CV52S)	
2022	CV3	5nm	CV3-AD; CV3-AD685	Cortex-A78AE	16	Automotive (Continental)	
2023	CV72S	5nm		Cortex A76	2	Security camera	
2024	CV75S	5nm		Cortex A76	2		url=https://www.ambarella.com/news/ambarellas-latest-5nm-ai-soc-family-runs-vision-language-models-and-ai-based-image-processing-with-industrys-lowest-power-consumption/
