= Mastretta =

Mexican car maker and design studio

- Type: Private
- Industry: Design; Automotive
- Founded: 1987; 39 years ago
- Headquarters: Mexico City, Mexico
- Key people: Daniel Mastretta; Carlos Mastretta
- Products: Various designs Automobiles; Kit-cars; Buses and trucks
- Subsidiaries: Tecnoidea; Unediseño (1998)

Mastretta Cars is a Mexican car maker and design studio established by industrial designer Daniel Mastretta in Mexico City in 1987. During the 1990s, Mastretta developed a small number of kit cars under the brands Tecnoidea and Unediseño, but the 2010 MXT is the first developed vehicle to reach international commercial availability.

Mastretta is often incorrectly claimed to be the first Mexican mass-production car maker, but other Mexican automotive companies Dina, Ramirez Industrial Group, VAM and D.M. Nacional had developed their own vehicles since the 1950s to a small national scale.

== History ==
During the 1990s, Mastretta focused on microbus (Mexico City metropolitan minibuses) body chassis design and engineering, as well as that of urban buses. This experience led to the construction of their first kit-car in 1995, the Unediseño-Mastretta MXA. The Unediseño Mastretta was built on the chassis of the Volkswagen Beetle, called the "Vocho" in Mexico, and used the Volkswagen air-cooled engine as power source. For this prototype, the engine delivered 44 bhp (33 kW; 45 PS) and reached a top speed of 127 km/h (79 mph).

A few hand-made units were exported to Germany, Japan and the USA, where the kit-car marketing was attractive for many collectors at the time; those that remain in Mexico are owned by Mastretta. A variation of the same model, the MXB, was also built. It featured different headlights and other minor modifications.

Automóvil Panamericano car magazine's February 1998 annual edition of Modelos (Models, a special catalogue with information about every commercial model on Earth and since that year, a few pages dedicated to kit-car makers) featured a paragraph on the Unediseño Mastretta.

== Mastretta MXT ==
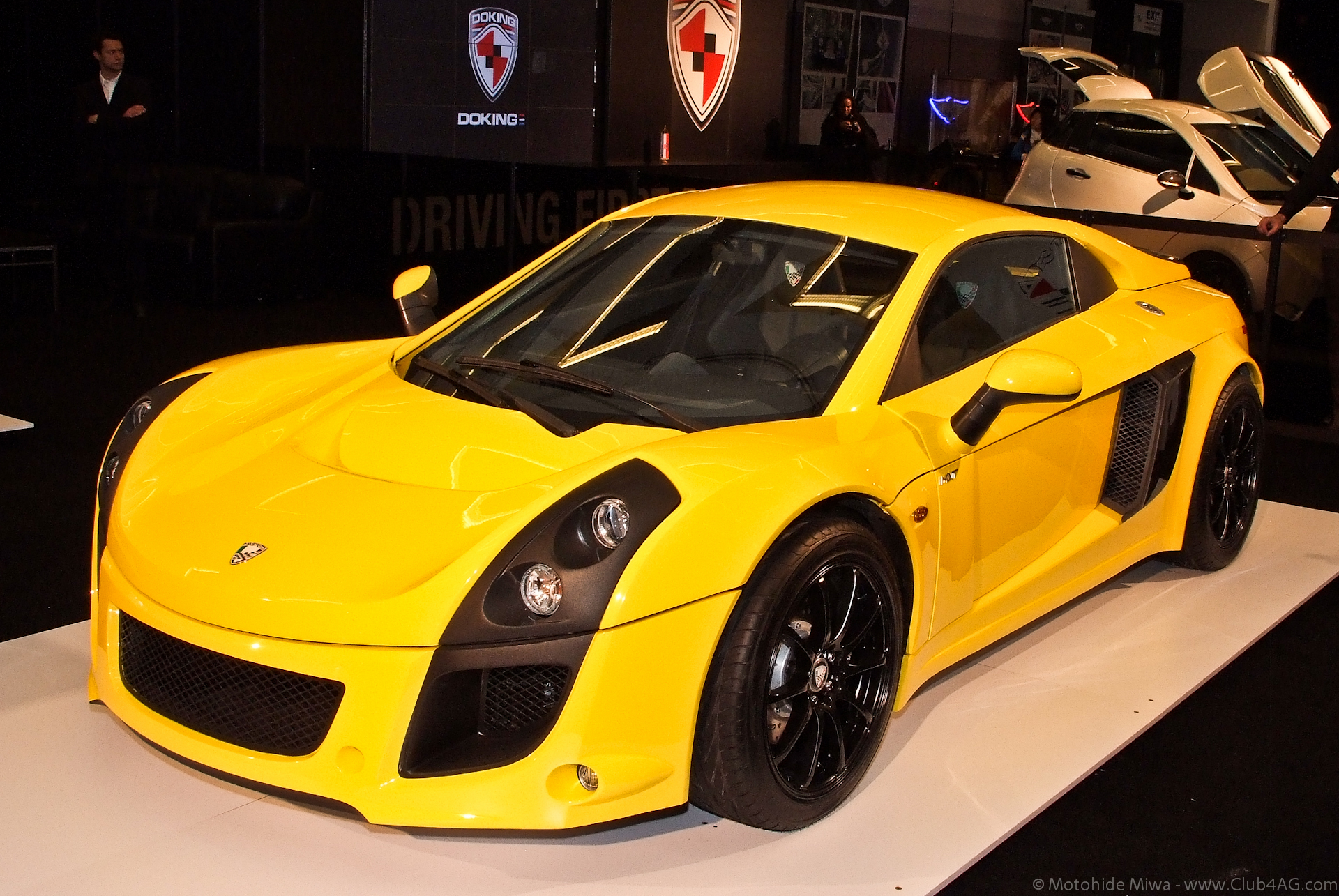
Mastretta MXT

Nine years later, in their #149 issue for June 2007, the magazine announced the production of Mastretta's third car, the MXT, now produced in Mexico City by Daniel Mastretta's company Tecnoidea.

With a proposed production of 200 MXT autos per year, Mastretta's Tecnoidea calls itself Mexico's only automaker. Although the engine, transmission, and other components are U.S.-made, the MXT's chassis, body, interior, and numerous other components are fabricated onsite in Mexico.

== Logo ==
Mastretta's logo features a non-sharped shield with the colours of the Mexican flag (green, white and red) and a diagonal checkered black and white racing stripe, representing the Mexican coat of arms. The name "Mastretta" appears across the top.

== See also ==
- DINA S.A.
- VUHL
- Cars in Mexico
