= VisLab =

Italian vehicular applications company

Coordinates: 44.764894°N 10.308455°E

Artificial Vision and Intelligent Systems Lab
- Established: 1996 (initiated 1990)
- Administrative staff: 26
- Location: Parma, Italy
- Website: www.vislab.it
- VisLab Logo

VisLab is an Italian company working on computer vision and environmental perception for vehicular applications. It was founded in the early 90s as a research laboratory at University of Parma. It started its activities in 1990, with its involvement in the Eureka PROMETHEUS Project. Since then the research group has focused on vehicular applications.

VisLab, directed by Alberto Broggi, undertakes basic and applied research, including the perception of the surrounding environment in vehicular applications using cameras and fusion with other sensors. Its researchers contribute to fields such as artificial vision, image processing, machine learning, neural networks, robotics, and sensor fusion.

In 2009, eleven VisLab researchers started a spinoff company, named VisLab srl, to commercialize the results of their main researches. The University of Parma owned a share of 5%. In 2015, VisLab was acquired by Silicon Valley company Ambarella Inc., and about 30 researchers asked and then were hired by VisLab to staff their new Parma location.

== History ==
In the early years, the research group formed by Broggi, Massimo Bertozzi and Alessandra Fascioli designed, realized, and tested an autonomous car known as ARGO. ARGO was a passenger car able to perceive the environment through the use of micro cameras, analyze the surroundings, plan a trajectory, and drive itself on normal roads. It was tested in 1998 with a 2000+ km tour in Italy, dubbed Mille Miglia in Automatic. In this test the vehicle drove for more than 94% in automatic mode. It was the first test in the world to use off-the-shelf and low cost technology (a Pentium 200 MHz PC and two low-cost video-phone cameras) in normal conditions of traffic, environment, and weather.

In 2005 a vehicle called TerraMax was able to successfully conclude the DARPA Grand Challenge; VisLab's vision system was its primary means of perception.

In 2007, a new version of TerraMax qualified for the DARPA Urban Challenge, which was not completed due to a fault.

In 2010 VisLab launched VIAC, the VisLab Intercontinental Autonomous Challenge, a 13,000 km test run for autonomous vehicles, from Italy to China. This was the first autonomous driving test on an intercontinental route; it lasted three months.

On 12 July 2013 VisLab tested the BRAiVE vehicle in downtown Parma. BRAiVE successfully negotiating two-way narrow rural roads, traffic lights, pedestrian crossings, speed bumps, pedestrian areas, and tight roundabouts. VisLab engineers activated the vehicle in Parma University Campus and stopped it in Piazza della Pilotta (downtown Parma): a 20 minute run in a real environment, together with real traffic at 11am on a working day, that required absolutely no human intervention.

On 31 March 2014 VisLab unveiled the new autonomous car DEEVA, which features more than 20 cameras, 4 lasers, GPS, KTM and IMU, and all sensors are hidden.

== Location ==
VisLab is located in the University of Parma main campus, south of Parma, Italy.
