= Ambarella Inc. =

Fabless semiconductor design company

Ambarella, Inc.
- Type: Public
- Traded as: Nasdaq: AMBA; Russell 2000 component
- Industry: Semiconductors
- Founded: January 15, 2004; 22 years ago
- Founders: Feng-Ming (Fermi) Wang; Les Kohn
- Headquarters: Santa Clara, California, United States
- Key people: Feng-Ming Wang (CEO); Les Kohn (CTO); John Young (CFO); Alberto Broggi (GM VisLab)
- Revenue: ▼US$226 million (2024)
- Operating income: ▼US$−155 million (2024)
- Net income: ▼US$−169 million (2024)
- Total assets: ▼US$658 million (2024)
- Total equity: ▼US$560 million (2024)
- Number of employees: 915 (2024)
- Website: ambarella.com
- Footnotes; Financials as of January 31, 2024

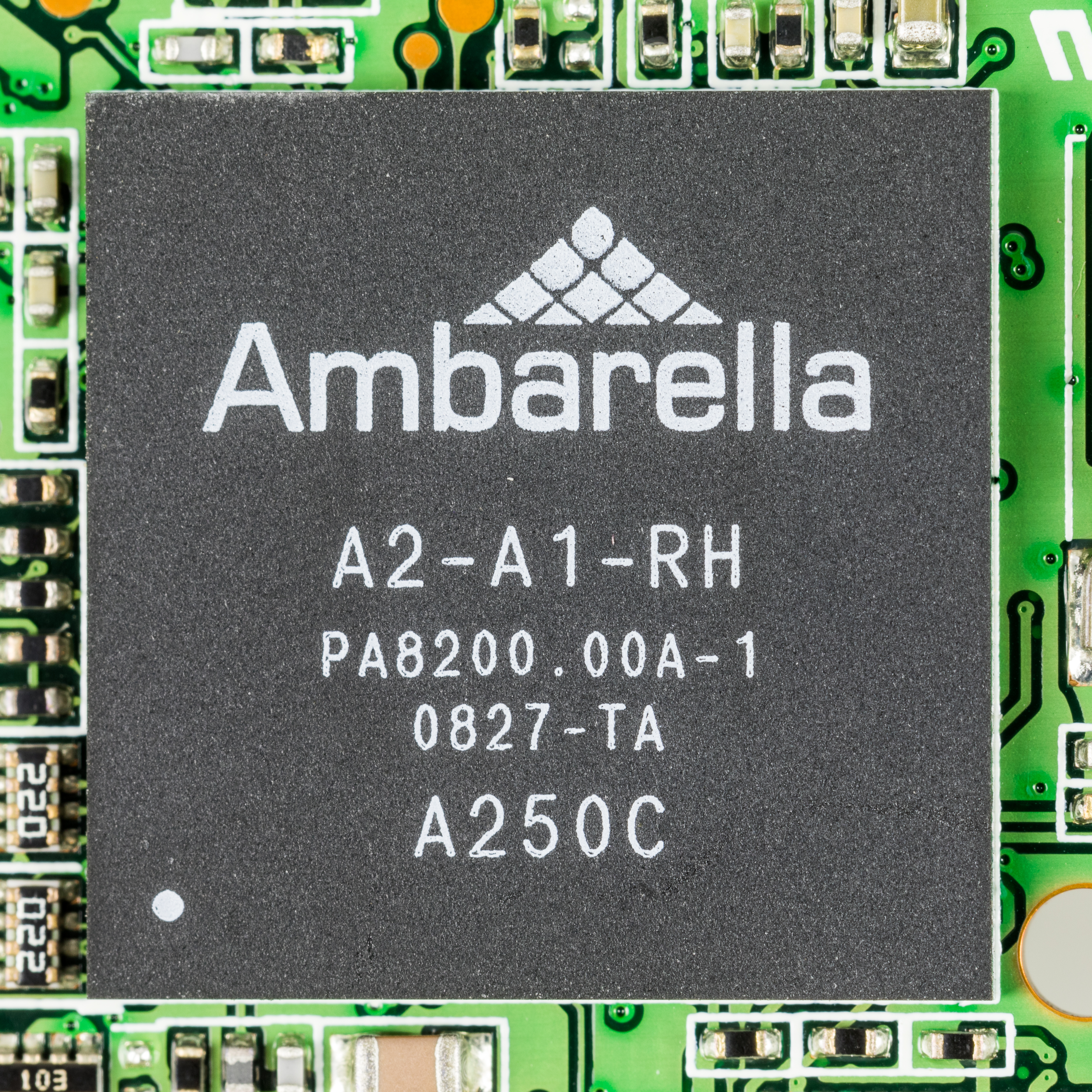
Ambarella A2-A1-RH, used in a camcorder

Ambarella, Inc. is an American fabless semiconductor design company, focusing on low-power, high-definition (HD) and Ultra HD video compression, image processing, and computer vision processors. Ambarella's products are used in a wide variety of human and computer vision applications, including video security, advanced driver assistance systems (ADAS), electronic mirror, drive recorder, driver and in-cabin monitoring, autonomous driving, and robotics applications. Ambarella's system on chips (SoCs) are designed to deliver a combination of video compression, image processing, and computer vision performance with low-power operation to enable cameras to extract data from high-resolution video streams.

== History ==
Ambarella was founded in 2004 by Feng-Ming (Fermi) Wang and Les Kohn with the goal of developing high-definition H.264 video encoders for the professional broadcast market. Soon after, Ambarella applied this same technology to consumer video and security IP camera markets, focusing on the development of low-power, compression-efficient chips capable of producing high-quality imagery in challenging lighting and high-motion environments.

Over the next decade, Ambarella chips appeared in a number of consumer camera products, including the GoPro Hero (up until the Hero 5 series), the Dropcam by Nest, Garmin automotive dash cams and the DJI Phantom series of drones. In professional markets, Ambarella chips were used in high-end broadcasting encoders such as from Harmonic Inc, and in IP cameras for surveillance from companies like i-PRO, Axis Communications and Bosch.

== Technology ==
In January 2022, Ambarella announced its new Artificial Intelligence Image Signal Processor. This AI-based ISP technology is “capable of recording 8K video or four 4K video streams” and “enhances color imaging and applies HDR in ultra-low light conditions.”

== Acquisitions and partnerships ==
In July 2015, Ambarella acquired VisLab, a pioneer in perception systems and autonomous vehicle research founded by Professor Alberto Broggi. VisLab has a history of developing computer vision and intelligent control systems for automotive and commercial applications, including ADAS and autonomous vehicles. Subsequent generations of Ambarella SoCs incorporated VisLab perception technologies at the hardware level, with the goal of targeting automotive OEM camera designs across all of SAE’s six levels of driving automation (ranging from fully manual to fully automated or “steering wheel optional”).

In November 2021, the company purchased Oculii, a software development company focused on improving “the resolution of radars in self-driving cars and autonomous vehicles."

In June 2022, Ambarella Inc. and Inceptio Technology announced their partnership. Inceptio chose four of Ambarella's CVflow SoCs for its automotive-grade central computing platform. Ambarella’s SoCs technology provides simultaneous power processing for “seven 8MP cameras, including AI compute, for surround camera perception and front ADAS safety features like collision avoidance.

In November 2022, Ambarella and elnfochips partnered to design a new line of AI camera products.

In January 2023, Ambarella and Continental announced to partner in the field of AI-based software and hardware systems on the CES 2023 in Las Vegas. Mainly in the field of advanced driver assistance and highly automated driving.

== See also ==
- List of Ambarella products
