= Inceptio Technology =

Chinese autonomous trucking company

Inceptio Technology, Inc.
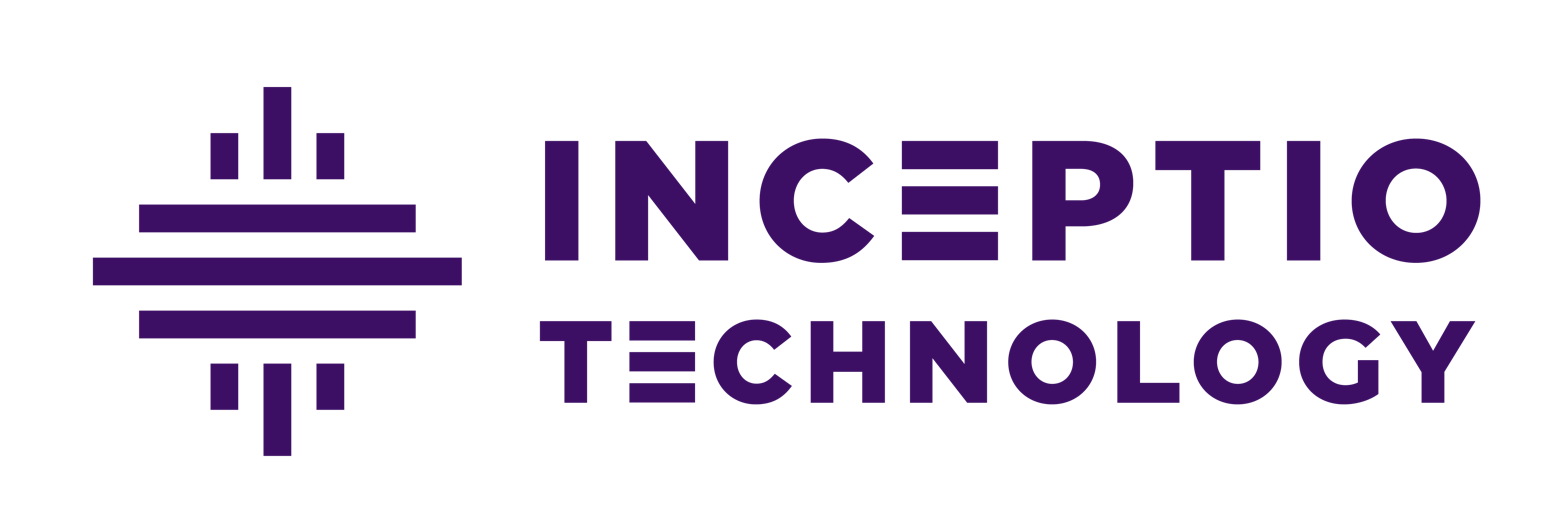
- Company type: Private
- Founded: 2018; 8 years ago
- Founder: Julian Ma
- Headquarters: Shanghai, China; Fremont, California
- Products: Autonomous trucks
- Website: en.inceptio.ai

Inceptio Technology is a Chinese developer of autonomous driving technologies for heavy-duty trucks. The company partnered with two Chinese OEMs to mass-produce Level 3 autonomous trucks starting in late 2021, and its trucks are operated across a nationwide line-haul logistics network in China by customers including Budweiser, Nestle, JD Logistics, and Deppon Express. In 2022, Inceptio Technology received a permit for testing Level 4 driverless autonomous heavy-duty trucks on public roads. The company is based in Shanghai, China and operates a Silicon Valley R&D center in Fremont, California.

== History ==
Inceptio Technology was founded in 2018 by Julian Ma.

In April 2020, Inceptio Technology raised a $100 million Series A round from logistics firm GLP and fleet management platform G7. Subsequently, the company raised a $120 million venture round led by Chinese electric vehicle battery maker CATL.

In March 2021, the company released the Inceptio Autonomous Driving System "XUANYUAN", a comprehensive proprietary platform geared towards mass production. The XUANYUAN system incorporates algorithms, Ultra Long Range Sensing (ULRS), and High Precision Lateral Sensing (HPLS) to identify vehicles in its vicinity and maneuver through traffic. At the time, the company also announced it would commence mass production by the end of 2021. In August 2021, Inceptio Technology raised $270 million in a Series B round led by JD Logistics, Meituan, and private equity firm PAG. In February 2022, the company raised $188 million in a Series B+ round led by Sequoia Capital China and Legend Capital.

In December 2021, Inceptio Technology completed its inaugural Level 4 (L4) automated truck road test, operating without a driver on a closed highway. In June 2022, Inceptio Technology became the first company in China to receive a permit from the Chinese government to test L4 autonomous heavy-duty trucks on public roads.

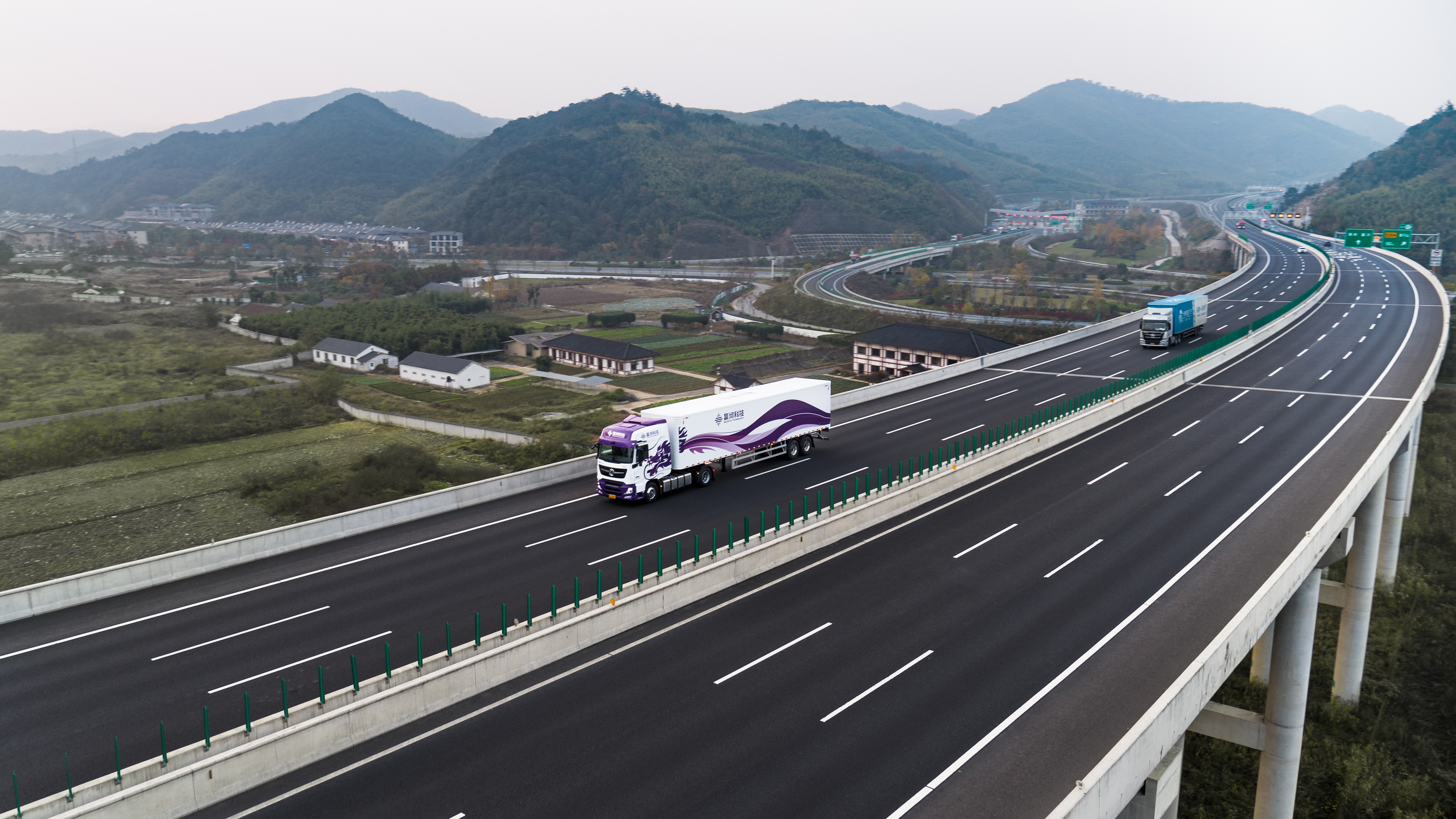
Inceptio's L3 Truck

As of 2023, the company claims that 600 trucks use their technology and that it expects the number to quadruple in 2024. On August 31, 2023, the company announced their autonomous trucks have driven over 50 million kilometers without any accidents on China's highways.

Inceptio Technology raised $678 million over six funding rounds, with the most recent being a Series B+ round on February 28, 2022.

== Partnerships and customers ==
=== Industrial partners ===
Inceptio Technology currently works with two OEMs to mass-produce Level 3 autonomous heavy-duty trucks: Dongfeng Commercial Vehicle and China National Heavy Duty Truck Group. It uses chips manufactured by Horizon Robotics and Ambarella Inc. Current customers include Jinxin Logistics, Nestle, Budweiser Brewing, and Kuayue Express.

== Operations ==
Inceptio Technology is headquartered in Shanghai, and the company has a Silicon Valley R&D center in Fremont, California. It is led by founder & CEO Julian Ma. Its chief technology officer is Ruigang Yang.

In August 2023, Inceptio Technology announced it had achieved 50 million kilometers of commercial operations, and confirmed that its autonomous driving features are available on 100% of China's National Trunk Highway System. Inceptio Technology claims that over its first 50 million kilometers of L3 autonomous driving, its partners have achieved labor cost savings of 20-50% and fuel savings of 2-10%.

Based on Inceptio Technology's first full year of commercial operations, China Pacific Insurance Company published a study claiming that Inceptio trucks had recorded zero accidents and registered just 0.1 collision warnings per 100 kilometers, which is 98% fewer than the average for human-operated trucks. Inceptio Technology also published a study claiming human safety operators in Inceptio trucks experience 35% less physical fatigue and 11% less psychological fatigue compared to conventional truck drivers.
