= Gregorio Ramirez Gonzalez =

Gregorio Ramírez González (March 30, 1913 in Sabinas Hidalgo, Nuevo León, Mexico – February 4, 2002 in Monterrey, Mexico) was a Mexican entrepreneur. He was born into a poor family whose main income came from a small town store owned by his father. He never completed his studies, finishing schools after the fifth grade. He decided to move to Monterrey, leaving his family back in Sabinas Hidalgo to work at his uncle's restaurant. He married María Jáuregui and had five children: Juan Gregorio, Guillermina, Clara, Gloria, and Rosa. After he got married, he began working at an automobile dealership. After a couple of years working at the dealership, he met several customers who wanted to purchase trucks, and from there on he began learning about the truck and bus market.

== Business ventures ==
In 1946, he started a small trailer shop in San Nicolás de los Garza, Nuevo León, which then became the huge Grupo Industrial Ramirez, a leader in the Mexican automotive industry. With companies like IASA, IMMSA, Autobuses Sultana, Trailers y Tractocamiones Ramírez, GIR, S.A. They became leaders in their area participating in joint ventures with Nissan, Ford, General Motors, White GMC, Nissan Forklifts, S.A.M.E. tractors, etc.

He also brought to the North American Continent the German automotive group Borgward in 1962. They brought the entire German plant and set up shop in Monterrey, México. The plant closed in 1970, but not before making the only Mexican car in history until recently.

He also went into the bank business creating Banco Monterrey, whose slogan was "Tu Banco Amigo", meaning "Your Friendly Bank." The government took the bank away from him. Then-President José López Portillo y Pacheco announced the nationalization of the country's banks during his Sixth State of the United Mexican States Address on Wednesday, September 1, 1982.

== Grupo Industrial Ramirez ==
Grupo Industrial Ramirez or GIR, S.A. was established as the first Mexican automotive company. They started by producing trucks from bits and pieces of other vehicles that came from the United States during World War II.

After a few prosperous years, they started to develop their products from their research and development. There were popular trucks such as the R19, R20, R22.

They also produced the renowned Rural Ramírez, an SUV and Pickup truck based on a model by International, which is still collected by some people in Mexico.

After his death, his son Juan Gregorio Ramírez took charge of the company.

== Honors ==
Gregorio Ramírez González was given honors numerous times, as an outstanding citizen for Nuevo León, his hometown Sabinas Hidalgo, as an entrepreneur, as a club member of the Rotary Club, and being part of a select group of important and influential Mexicans of his time.
