= VisLab Intercontinental Autonomous Challenge =

Challenge conceived by VisLab

VIAC, the VisLab Intercontinental Autonomous Challenge, is the challenge conceived by VisLab as an extreme test of autonomous vehicles. It ran from July 20, 2010 to October 28, 2010, involving four driverless vehicles driving with virtually no human intervention on an almost 16,000 kilometres (9,900 mi) trip from Parma, Italy to Shanghai, China.

== Overview ==
The 2010 World Expo's theme was “better cities, better life”; therefore issues related to sustainable mobility were central to the Expo and this challenge of reaching Shanghai with driverless vehicles provided a clear demonstration of future vehicles; it is considered one of the main milestones in Robotics.

VisLab, thanks to a project partially funded by ERC -the European Research Council- showed that one day it will be possible to move goods between two continents with non-polluting vehicles powered by green energy and with virtually no human intervention. Goods were packed in Parma and taken to Shanghai on driverless vehicles for the first time in history.

== The idea ==
The aim was to test and stress the current technology in a unique event: non-polluting and non-oil based autonomous vehicles in real traffic conditions on an extreme journey between two continents, the final outcome being a huge dataset with a very large variety of situations to be further used to refine the onboard perception system.

== Technical details ==
The trip traversed remote areas in Russia, Kazakhstan, and China, for which no map was available; due to the length of the trip it was also impossible to check and test the route in advance. Therefore, VisLab defined the following behavior.

The first vehicle drove autonomously in selected sections of the trip, conducting experimental tests on sensing, decision, and control subsystems, and continuously collecting data. Human interventions were needed on a regular basis to define the route and intervene in critical situations.

The second vehicle automatically followed the route defined by the leader vehicle by following it either visually or thanks to GPS waypoints sent by the leader vehicle, therefore requiring no human intervention (100% autonomous). This is regarded as a readily exploitable vehicle, able to move on predefined routes.

During the trip, demonstrations were scheduled in specific hot spots, showing autonomous vehicles following given routes, negotiating traffic, avoiding obstacles, and stopping when required. The first demonstration was held in Rome at the EUR district on October 29, 2009, when Rome's Major, Gianni Alemanno, officially presented the VIAC challenge. The last demonstration was given exactly one year later, on Oct 28, 2010, in Shanghai, China, during a parade at the World Expo, organized by the European Pavilion.

Although the vehicles were electric and had solar panels on the roof, propulsion was not powered by the solar panels but by the original vehicle's batteries which were charged at power outlets or, when no power outlet was available, by generators. The solar panels powered the autonomous driving system (sensors, processing engines, actuators, radios, GPS,..).

== Worldwide Milestone and Data Analysis ==
The VisLab Intercontinental Autonomous Challenge is considered a unique milestone in vehicular robotics, just like the DARPA Grand Challenge in 2005 and the DARPA Urban Challenge in 2007. The vehicles collected about 50 terabytes of data to be used in the future for further processing off-line.

== Organization and Logistics ==
The logistics were managed by Overland Network, which provided 4 RVs (motor homes) and 3 additional trucks as a support. The expedition was therefore formed by 4 autonomous vehicles, 4 RVs, 3 trucks, and occupied about 20 people for three months. A satellite link broadcast live data and video streaming for the whole duration of the trip (except in China) so that everybody on the Internet was able to witness the progress of the experiment.

== See also ==
- DARPA Grand Challenge
- DARPA Grand Challenge (2007)
- VisLab
- Google driverless car
