= Nextbase =

Dash cam manufacturing company

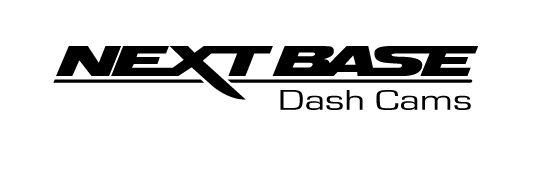
- Industry: Consumer electronics
- Founded: 1999; 27 years ago
- Headquarters: London, UK
- Website: www.nextbase.com/en-gb/

Nextbase is a British consumer technology company and the manufacturer of dash cams.

Founded in 1999, the company was originally a manufacturer of in-car entertainment systems such as portable DVD players, and introduced Dash Cams to the UK market in 2009. It is currently the UK market leader, according to GfK data by volume, with 80% market share. Nextbase products are also available in the USA, Canada, Australia and New Zealand, as well as major European markets – where it holds a 67% market share – including Belgium, Spain, Italy, Norway, Romania, Czech Republic, France, Netherlands, Poland, Germany, Ireland, and Slovakia.

== History ==
Nextbase was originally an importer and re-brander of portable entertainment systems, such as DVD players. In the late 2000s, and early 2010s, the company pioneered a range of branded dashboard cameras, more commonly known as dash cams – digital camcorders, which are mounted on a vehicle’s windscreen to record the road ahead.

According to data from independent retail analysts GfK, dashboard mounted digital cameras, aka "Dash Cams", became the fastest growing area in consumer electronics in 2015, faster than drones and actions cams, with sales increasing by 395%.

Of this market in the UK, Nextbase’s range of Dash Cams now accounts for nearly 80% by volume, according to GfK sales data by volume, December 2020

Nextbase has been recognised by consumer group Which?, winning multiple Best Buy awards, and received other accolades from the likes of The Sunday Times, The Daily Mail, The Independent, Driving.co.uk, Auto Express and T3.

== Technology ==
In 2019, Nextbase launched its 'Series 2' range of Dash Cams, which included a number of technical firsts and patented technology, including:

- Emergency SOS, which dials the emergency services in case of an accident.
- Alexa Voice Control, allowing for safer driving by keeping eyes on the road and hands on the wheel.
- What3words, this geocode system pinpoints the user's precise location within three metres, allowing drivers to relay their location accurately to emergency services.
- Bluetooth 2.0, a world-first in Dash Cam technology to enable quick transferring between the camera and user’s phone.

== Insurance ==
Nextbase worked with AXA insurance to develop the world’s first Dash Cam insurance policy in 2014. The policy offered drivers a discounted premium (12.5%) if they drove with a dashcam, and paved the way for a new type of insurance product, which is now widely adapted in the UK, with over 40 top insurers accepting Dash Cam footage and having their own Dash Cam inclusive policies, as well as other countries.

In 2021, Nextbase launched the world’s first insurance policy from a dash cam manufacturer. The product rewards safer drivers with discounted car insurance premiums for having a dash cam installed in the vehicle.

== National Dash Cam Safety Portal ==
In July 2018, Nextbase launched the National Dash Cam Safety Portal, a not-for-profit initiative to help motorists report serious road incidents directly to UK police forces using their dashcam video as evidence.

The portal is currently being used by all 43 police forces in England and Wales. As of 2024, the Portal had received 146,560 uploads, saving more than a century of police time.

Portal statistics show that nearly 70% of dash cam video submissions result in further police or legal action.

It has also been backed by countless UK road safety charities, including BRAKE, Cycling UK, and British Horse Society.

Nextbase also supports the UK’s Vision Zero campaign, which aims to achieve a highway system with no fatalities or serious injuries involving road traffic.

== International Expansion ==
In 2019, Nextbase expanded internationally. Its products are now available in over 20 countries, including most European markets, the USA and Australia.

== Awards ==
Nextbase's product have been awarded five Which? Best Buys, for the 222, 322GW, 422GW, 522GW and 622GW.

The company has received recognition for its innovations in Dash Cam technology from The Sunday Times, The Daily Mail, The Independent, Driving.co.uk, Auto Express, What Car?, Honest John, Tech Advisor and T3.

== Sponsorship ==
Nextbase signed as a sponsor of Halfords Yuasa Racing for the 2016 British Touring Car Championship, which sees driving pair Gordon Shedden, the reigning BTCC Champion, and Matt Neal partner each other for the seventh successive campaign.
