= TerraMax =

Trademark for autonomous/unmanned ground vehicle technology

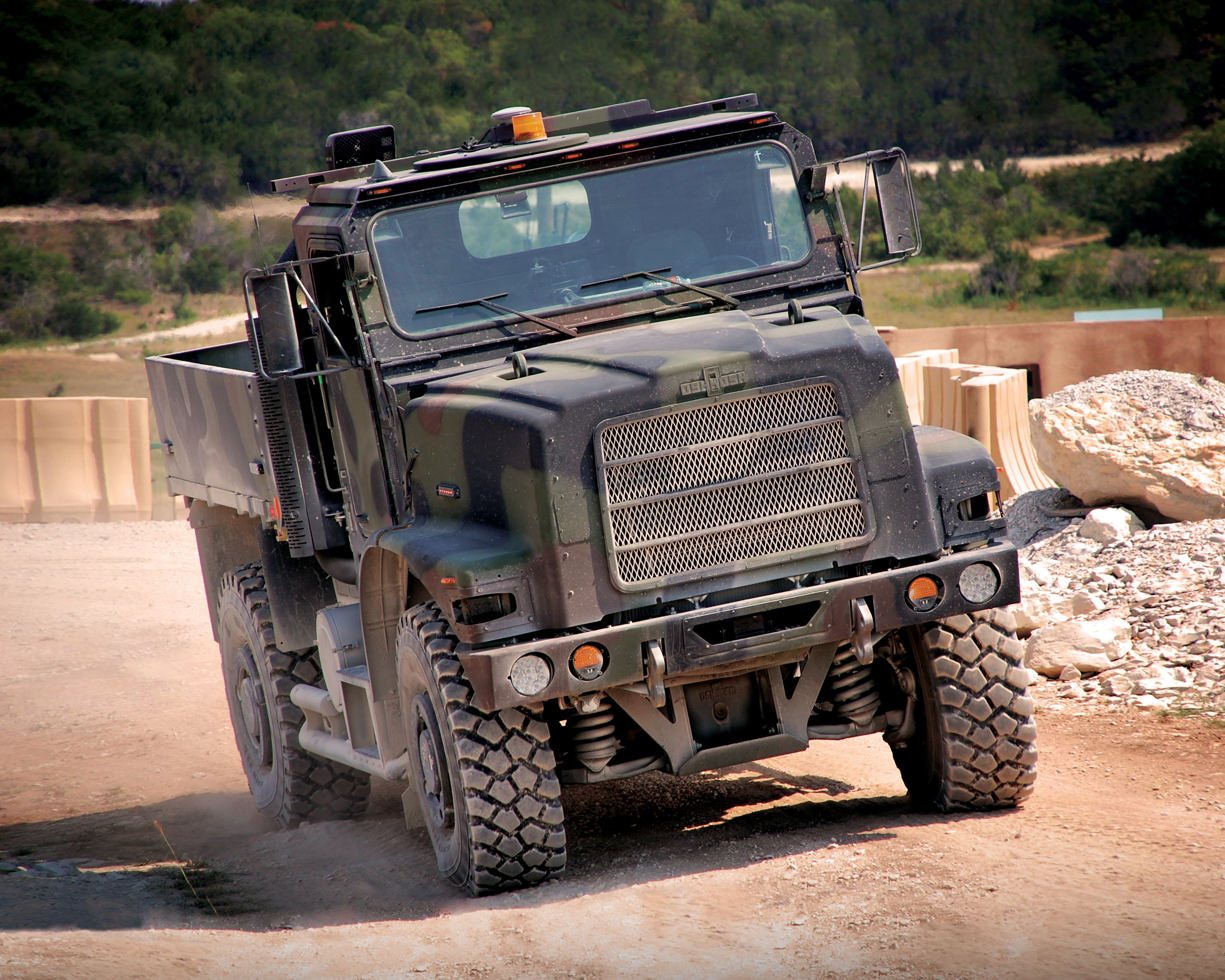
An Oshkosh 4x4 MTVR fitted with TerraMax autonomous technology; this vehicle had previously participated in 2007 DARPA Grand Challenge.

TerraMax is the trademark for autonomous/unmanned ground vehicle technology developed by Oshkosh Defense. Primary military uses for the technology are seen as reconnaissance missions and freight transport in high-risk areas without the need of human operators, protecting the soldiers from possible attacks, ambushes or the threat of mines and IEDs. The technology could also be used in civilian settings, such as autonomous snow clearing at airports.

The original TerraMax vehicle was based on Oshkosh’s 6x6 Medium Tactical Vehicle Replacement (MTVR) and this was entered in the 2004 and 2005 DARPA Grand Challenges. A 4x4 variant was subsequently developed for, and entered in, the 2007 DARPA Urban Challenge. Since then, Oshkosh has continued developing the technology and in addition to four MTVRs has fitted the technology to its Palletized Load System (PLS), Family of Medium Tactical Vehicles (FMTV). and MRAP All Terrain Vehicle (M-ATV).

== Development and history ==
Oshkosh actively commenced development of the TerraMax in mid-2003. In the 2004 DARPA Grand Challenge (March 13–14, 2004) Team TerraMax was one of only seven teams to successfully navigate the qualifying course, going on to manage 1.2 miles on the race course before being ‘confronted’ by an impassable bush. The 2004 Team TerraMax consisted of Oshkosh Truck (now Oshkosh Defense), University of Parma's Artificial Vision and Intelligent Systems Laboratory (VisLab), Teledyne Scientific Company, Auburn University, IBEO and Caterpillar. At the time, Don Verhoff, Oshkosh's executive vice president of technology explained that: "although design development may continue for years, the idea of a driverless convoy of defense vehicles to deliver supplies to the front line, never jeopardizing the welfare of a single driver, is closer than one might imagine."

In October 2005 a second-generation TerraMax was one of five vehicles to complete the 2005 DARPA Grand Challenge 132-mile desert course. Unofficial run time was 12 hours and 51 minutes, this outside of the 10-hour limit to qualify for the $2 million prize money. The 2005 Team TerraMax consisted of Oshkosh Truck, Rockwell Collins, University of Parma's Artificial Vision and Intelligent Systems Laboratory (VisLab) and several financial sponsors.

Continuing development of TerraMax technologies, in January 2006 Oshkosh unveiled an unmanned version of its Palletized Load System (PLS) truck at the U.S. Army Tactical Wheeled Vehicle Component Technology Demonstrations in Yuma, Arizona. East.

In 2007 Team TerraMax competed in the DARPA Urban Challenge with a 4x4 MTVR. In June 2010, Oshkosh Defense was awarded the U.S. Marine Corps Cargo UGV (CUGV) initiative contract. The contract was awarded by US Marine Corps Warfighting Laboratory (MCWL) and the Joint Ground Robotics Enterprise Robotics Technology Consortium. The first evaluation for the cargo UGV was completed in May 2011 at Fort Pickett.

In October 2010 at the Association of the United States Army (AUSA) Annual Meeting and Exposition at the Washington Convention Center, Oshkosh displayed an FMTV Load Handling System (LHS) variant fitted with TerraMax technology.

In May 2014 Oshkosh announced that to demonstrate capabilities for route-clearance missions it had integrated its TerraMax unmanned ground vehicle (UGV) technology onto an Oshkosh MRAP All-Terrain Vehicle (M-ATV). The vehicle was demonstrated in June 2014 at the Eurosatory defence exhibition in Paris where it was equipped with a mine roller and autonomously navigated a course that simulated military route clearance missions.

The company was awarded a contract to evaluate the CUGV as a route clearing UGV, an effort that saw three vehicles working together. The trials took place at Fort A.P. Hill, Virginia, in April 2015. Also in 2015, the US Army worked on requirements documentation for the introduction of leader-follower technology for the Oshkosh 10×10 PLS logistics and support vehicles, which would be used initially as a driver safety mechanism for functions such as braking. In 2016, TerraMax-equipped vehicles took part in the Autonomous Ground Resupply Programme. Under the programme, the vehicles were expected to demonstrate the carrying of cargo from the point of embarkation to a forward-operating base (FOB) and then to a patrol base.

=== Other autonomous projects ===
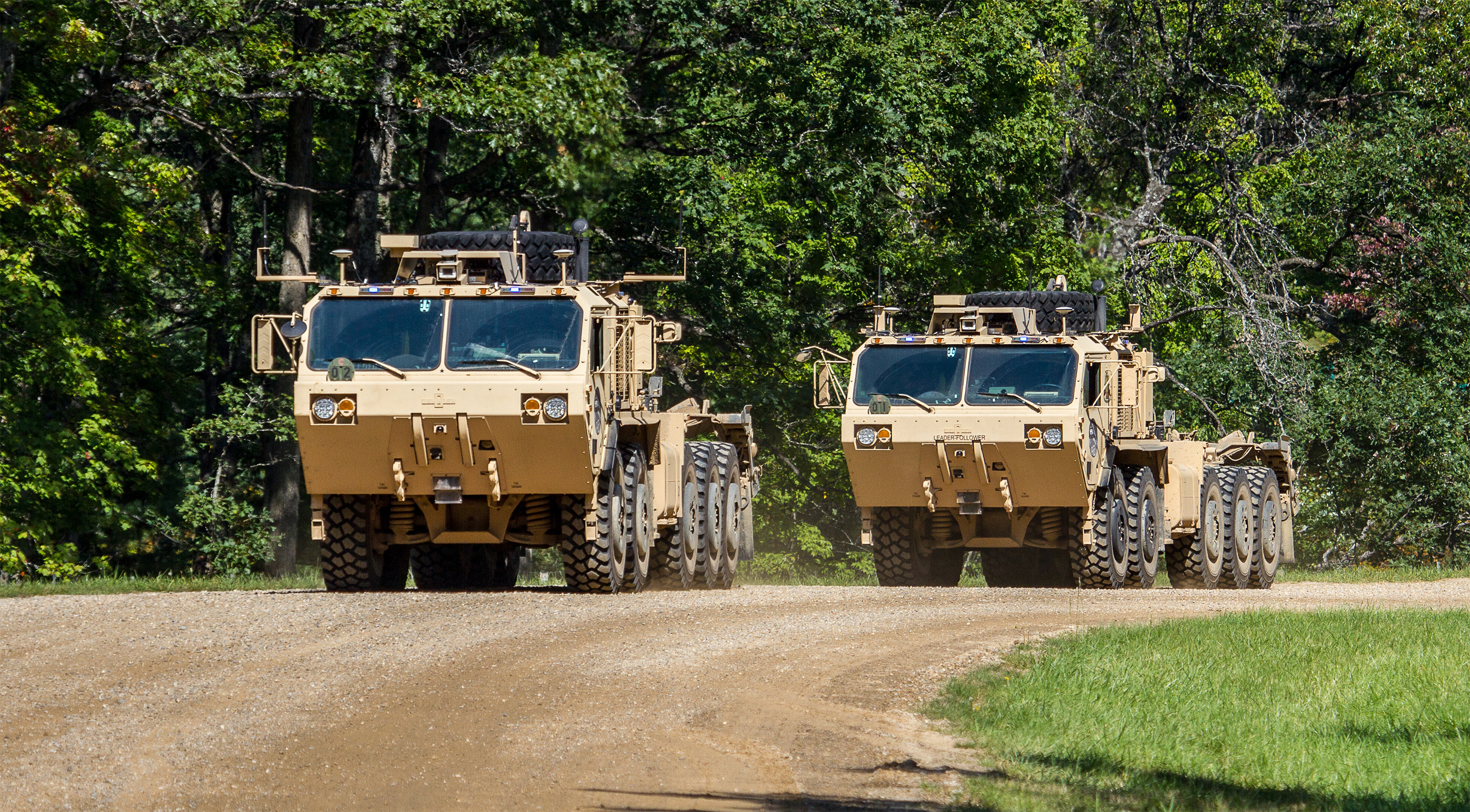
Oshkosh received USD49 million to integrate autonomous technology onto PLS vehicles as part of the ExLF programme.

Oshkosh is also involved in a number of other autonomous vehicle projects in conjunction with partners that include TARDEC, Lockheed Martin, Robotic Research, and DCS.

In 2016, Oshkosh PLS vehicles took part in the Autonomous Ground Resupply Programme. Under the programme, the vehicles were expected to demonstrate the carrying of cargo from the point of embarkation to a forward-operating base (FOB) and then to a patrol base.

On 27 June 2018, as part of the Expedient Leader Follower (ExLF) programme, Oshkosh received USD49 million to integrate its autonomous technology onto PLS vehicles. The TARDEC-led programme was awarded through an Other Transaction Authority (OTA) contract and is intended to facilitate the transition to an official Program of Record. The programme is expected to last until the end of its contract term in March 2021.

In early 2019, a fleet of ten vehicles was outfitted with autonomous technology and subjected to government qualification and safety evaluations. This initial phase was succeeded by the integration of autonomous technology into an additional sixty vehicles, which were then slated for participation in an Operational Technical Demonstration (OTD) in early 2020.

Oshkosh began integrating an initial 10 autonomy kits upon the award for the engineering test, verification, validation, and ATEC Safety Release, and will integrate another 60 kits for fiscal year 2019 for OTDs. The OTDs will occur in the second quarter of fiscal year 2020. The contract holds an option to procure up to 150 autonomy kits.

== Technology ==
TerraMax Unmanned Ground Vehicle (UGV) technology is modular and designed to be integrated into any tactical wheeled vehicle. The components of TerraMax are located so as not to impede the combat requirements of soldiers, while maintaining the utility of the vehicle. The technology is fully incorporated into the brakes, steering, engine and transmission. Fitted vehicles retain the ability to be driver-operated. Fitted vehicles can be operated fully autonomously in any position in a convoy, or semi-autonomously to follow the path of the lead vehicle.

The TerraMax UGV package consists of Oshkosh’s Command Zone electronics, a sensor suite and an advanced operator control unit (OCU).

Command Zone is an integrated control and diagnostics system that is computer-controlled, electronics technology that operates and diagnoses all major vehicle networks. The backbone of the Command Zone system is advanced multiplexing technology.

The multimodal sensor suite consists of a high definition LIDAR (light detection and ranging) system, a wide dynamic range camera, a short wave infrared camera, four situational awareness cameras, 12 short range radar systems (providing 360° close-view) and three long range radar systems. The military grade global navigation satellite system (GNSS) along with map registration software technology ensures the operation of the system without a satellite signal where a global positioning system (GPS) navigation system is blocked or denied.

The vehicle mounted with TerraMax UGV technology is autonomously controlled by an operator control unit (OCU). It enables the operators to manipulate route information and look out or manage internal operations and status of autonomous systems over tactical data links. The tele-operated OCU shows the necessary information according to the priority and facilitates the fast input of commands to maintain the pace in convoy operations. The screen of OCU displays overhead imagery, automated routes and driving parameters. It gives feedback if it identifies an obstacle to continue, or changes track accordingly. The OCU allows a single operator to control one or more UGVs. The operator can control an UGV with infrequent monitoring of the unit.

From an earlier statement that it desired one third of its fleet to be autonomous by 2015, the U.S. Army now believes that the technology for autonomous vehicles may be ready for the field by 2025. At an AUVSI symposium in Arlington, Virginia in October 2015, Dr Paul Rogers, director of the army's Tank Automotive Research Development and Engineering Center (TARDEC), said "Autonomous convoy technology for the US army remains about 10 years away, depending on how the acquisition process moves, due to requirements, testing, and budgeting processes."

== Television ==
The TerraMax was featured in Series 19 of BBC Television series Top Gear. It was featured against presenter James May in the Range Rover in an off-road challenge in the Nevada Automotive Test Center, Nevada, USA.

== Gallery ==
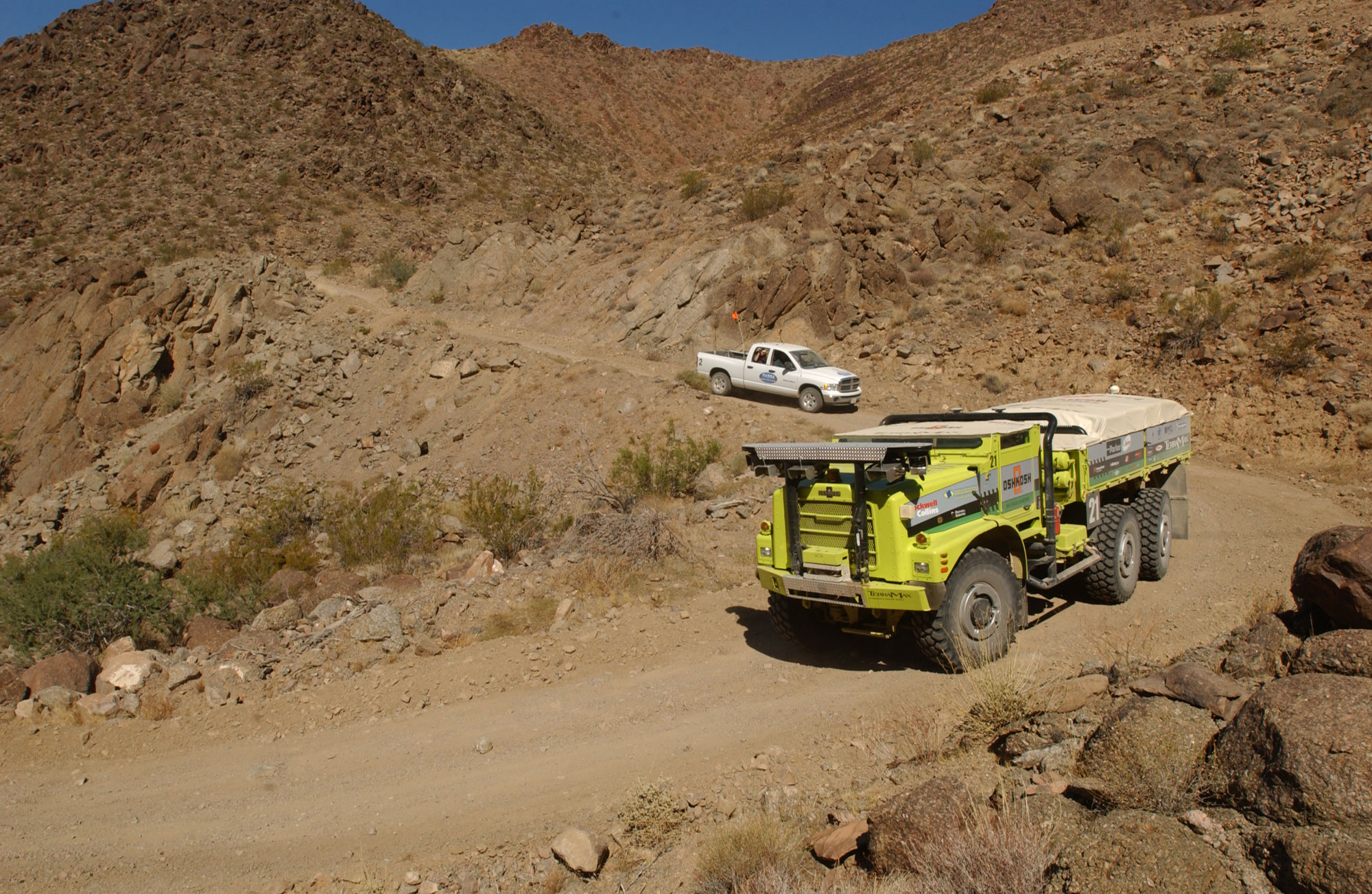
MTVR 6x6 participating in the DARPA 2005 Grand Challenge

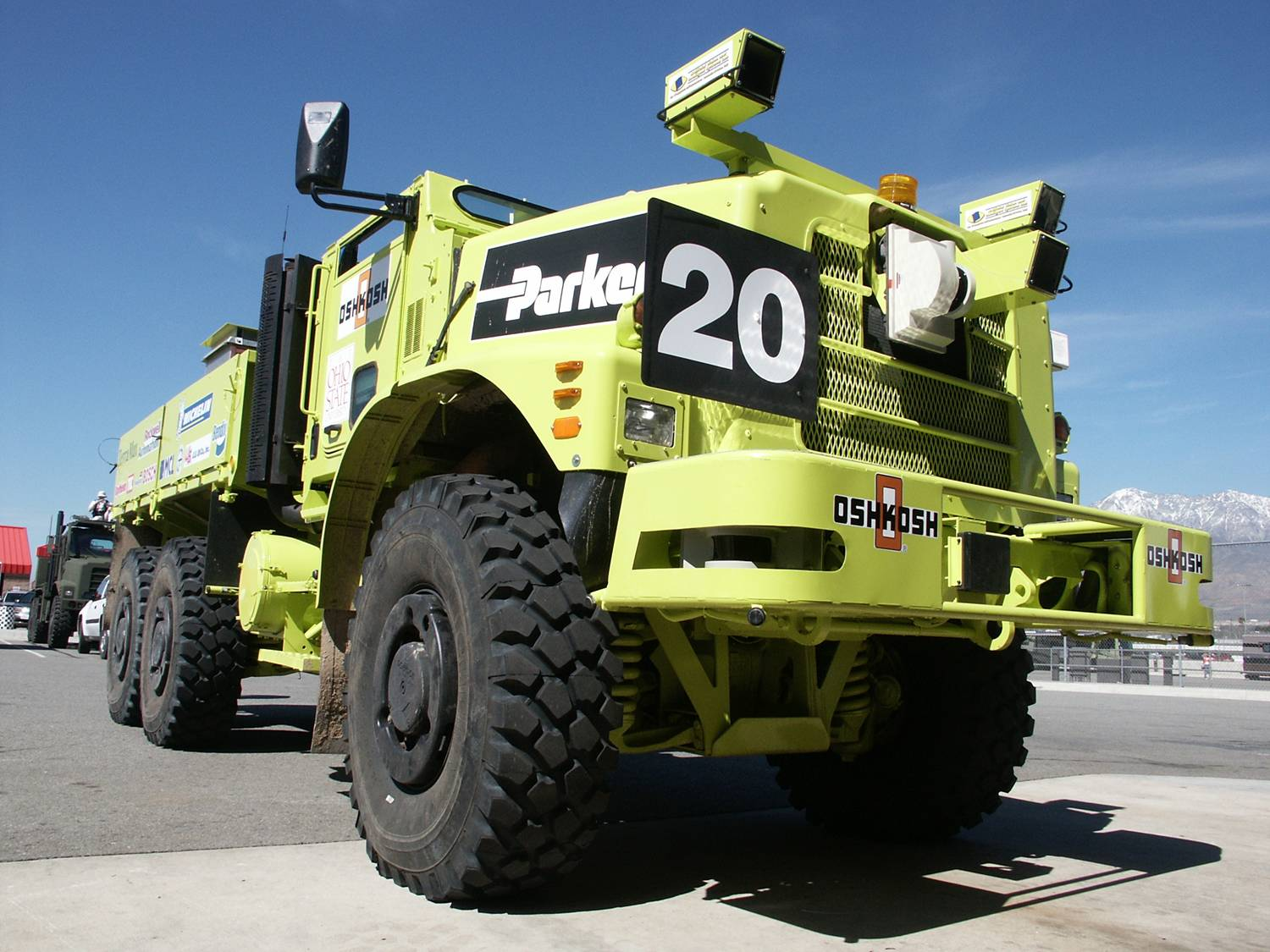
TerraMax at the 2004 DARPA Grand Challenge

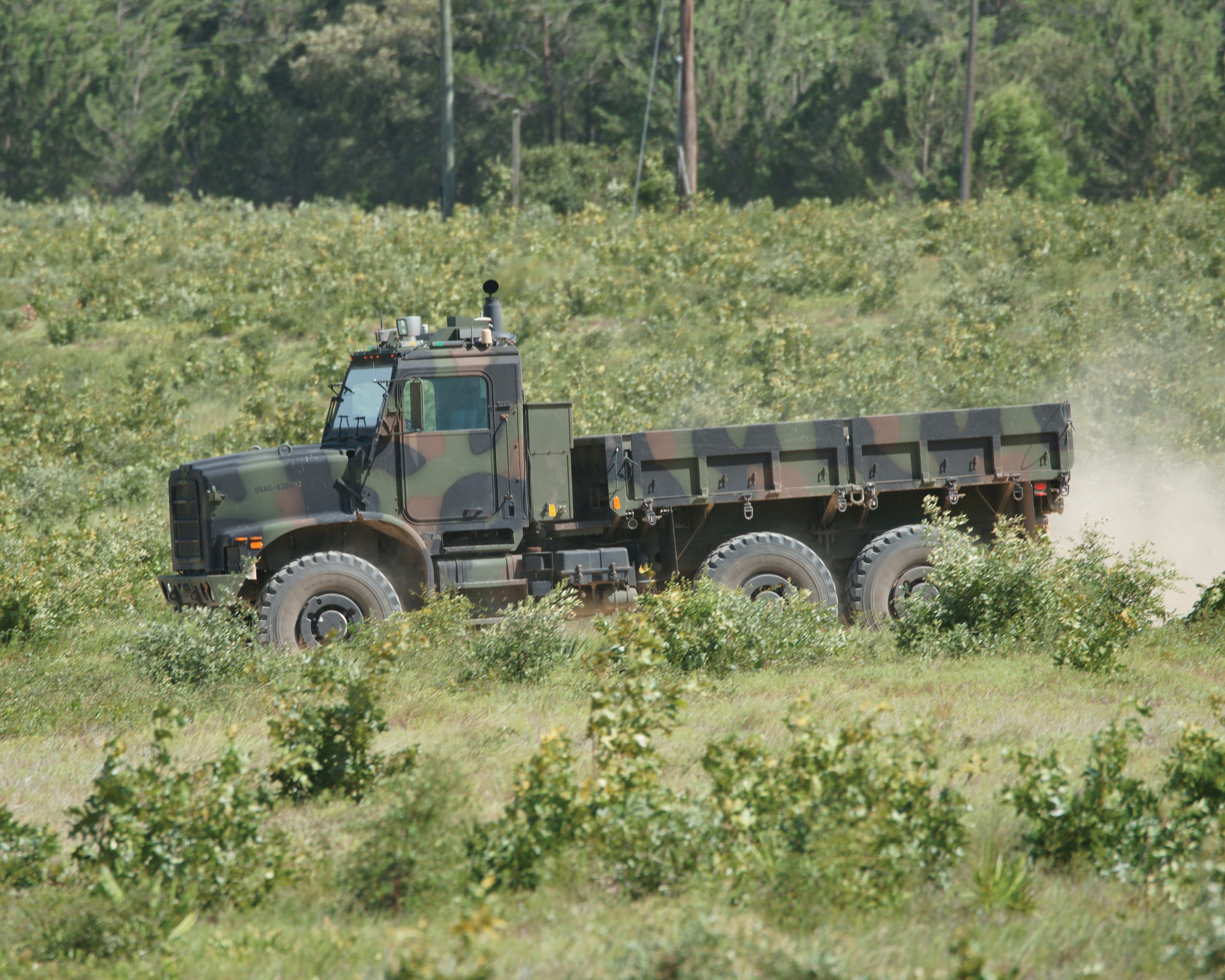
MTVR with TerraMax

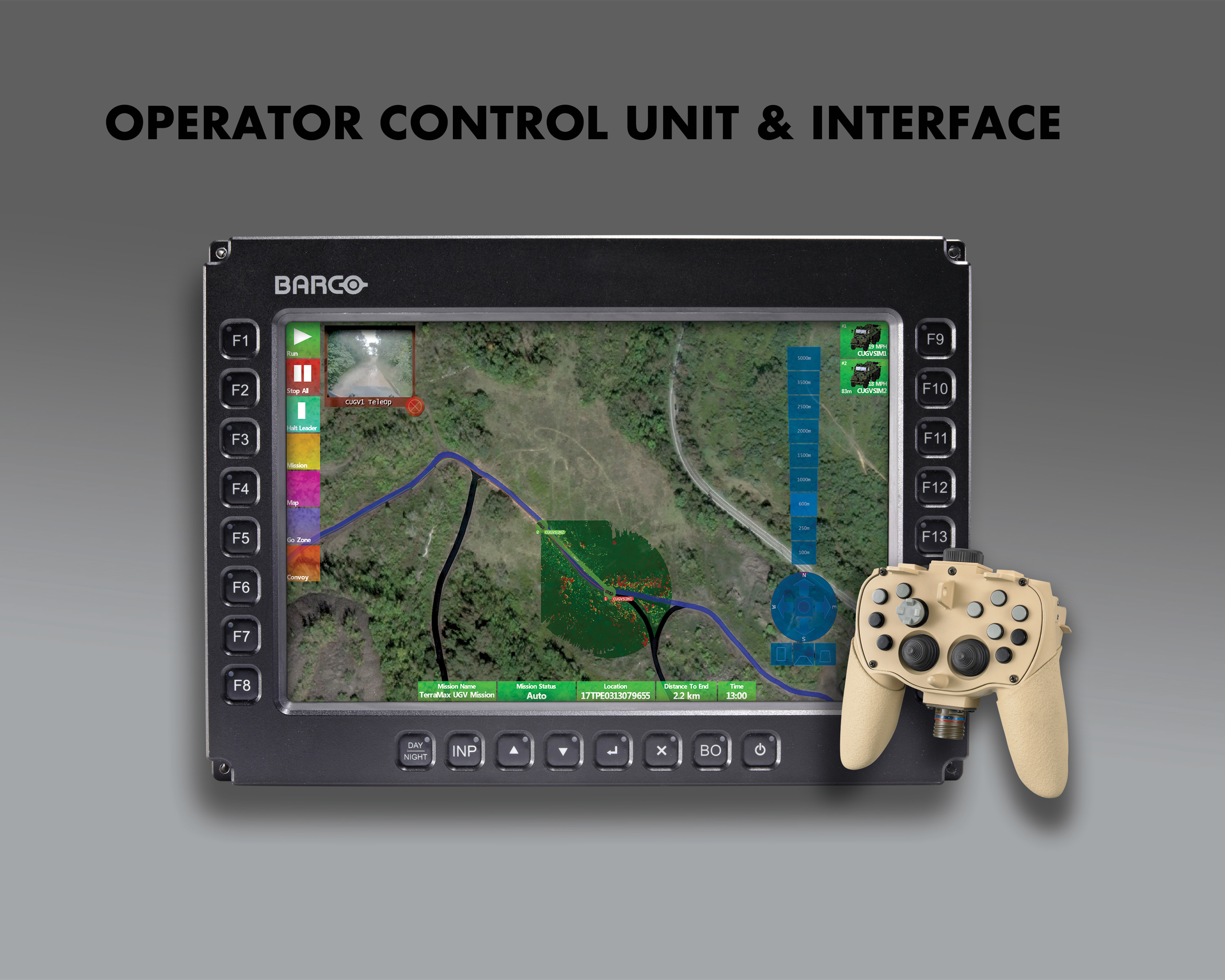
Operator Control Unit and Interface for TerraMax

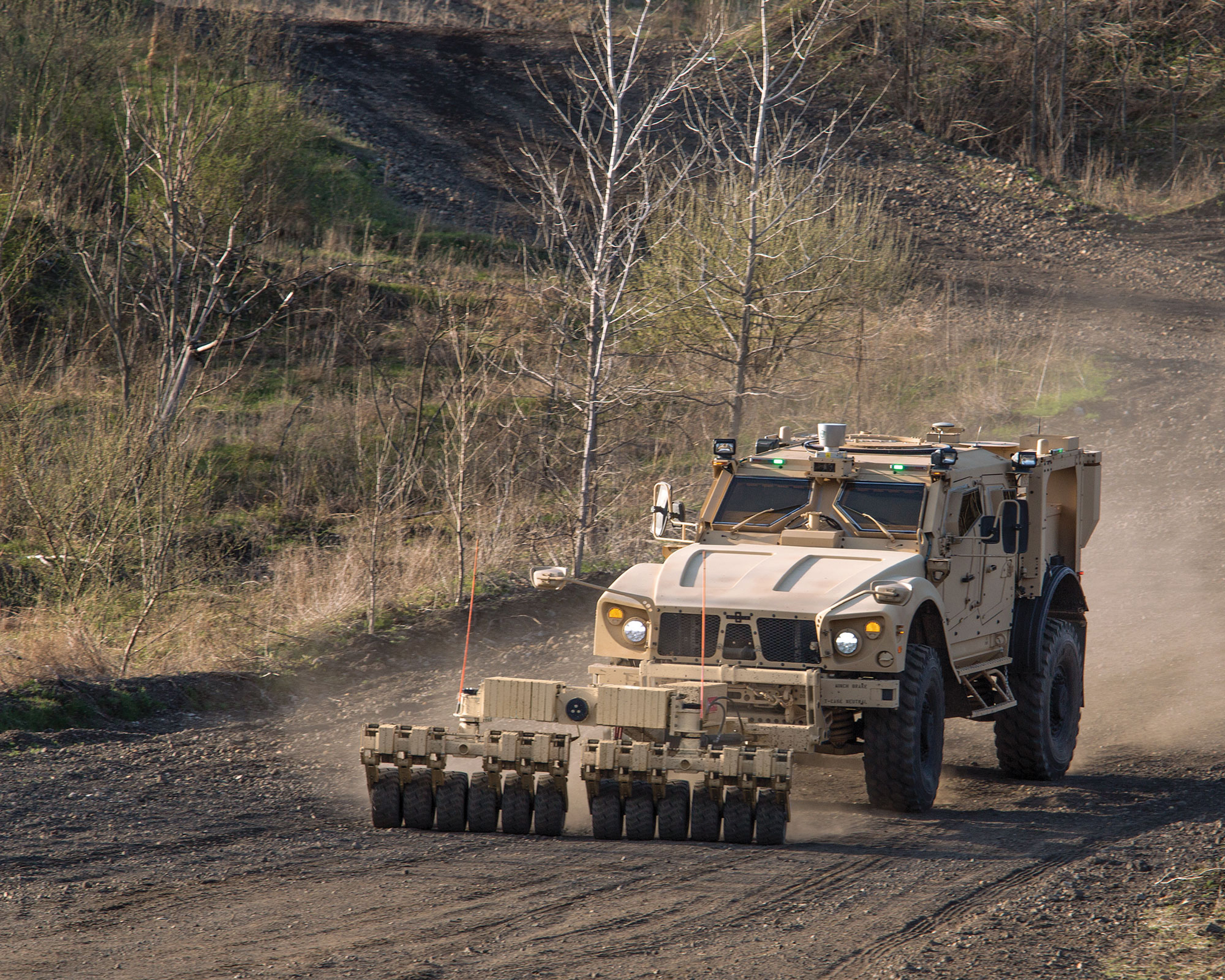
M-ATV (with mine roller attachment) with TerraMax

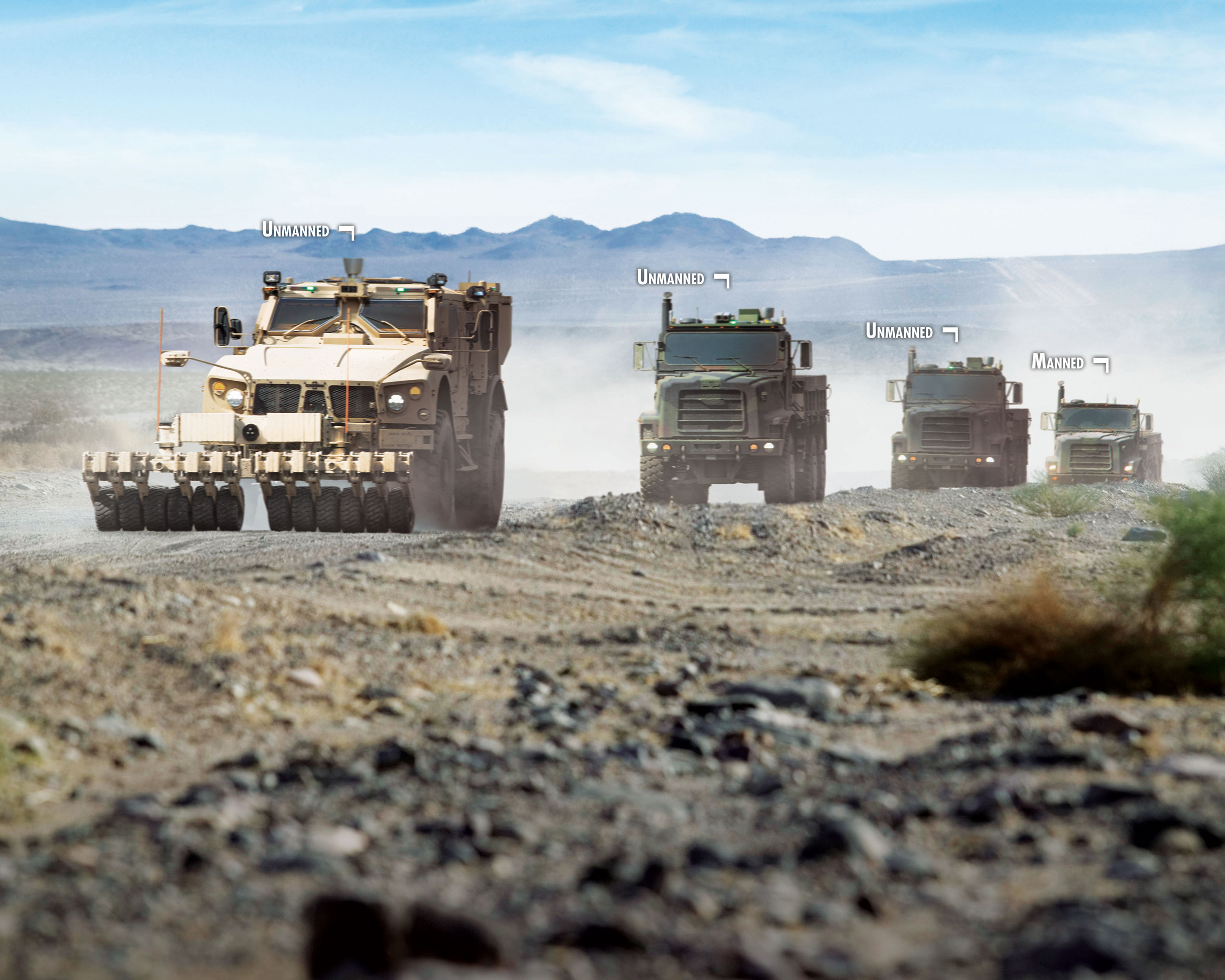
In convoy, an M-ATV with mine roller attachment) and two MTVRs with TerraMax. The third MTVR is manned.

== See also ==
- Oshkosh Medium Tactical Vehicle Replacement (MTVR)
- Oshkosh M-ATV
- Oshkosh Corporation
- Palletized Load System
- Unmanned ground vehicle
- Vehicular automation
- Autonomous logistics
- DARPA Grand Challenge
- Top Gear (series 19) (TerraMax vs. Range Rover)
