= Mastretta MXT =

Mexican sportscar (2011–2014)

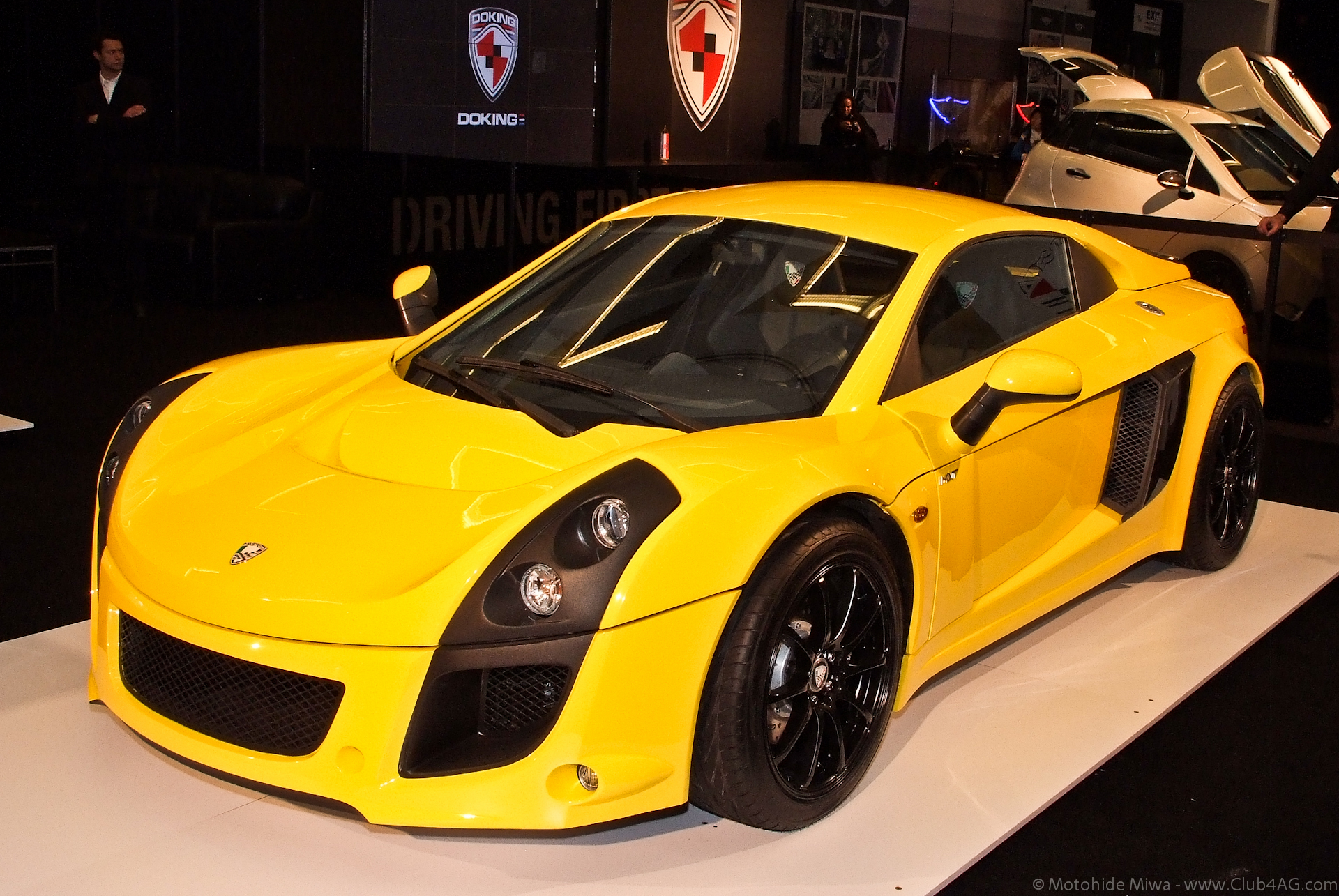

Overview
- Manufacturer: Mastretta
- Also called: MXT
- Production: 2011–2014
- Assembly: Mexico: Mexico City
- Designer: Daniel Mastretta

Body and chassis
- Class: Sports car
- Body style: 2-door coupé
- Layout: MR layout

Powertrain
- Engine: 2.0 L turbocharged GDI I4
- Transmission: 5-speed manual

Dimensions
- Length: 3,900 mm (153.5 in)
- Width: 1,790 mm (70.5 in)
- Height: 1,150 mm (45.3 in)
- Curb weight: 900 kg (1,984 lb)

Chronology
- Predecessor: Mastretta MXB

The Mastretta MXT is an automobile produced by the Mexican car manufacturer Mastretta. It is the first car that Mastretta has designed without any foreign input. The MXT is based loosely on the Lotus Elise and the Audi R8. The MXT entered production on 1 January 2011. It received national and international attention for being almost entirely produced and designed in Mexico. Production of the Mastretta MXT ended in May 2014.

== History ==
=== Prototipo Cero ===
The MXT Prototipo Cero (Spanish for Prototype Zero) was the third automobile developed by Mastretta, succeeding the MXB and MXA kit cars. The name "MXT" refers to the car's MeXican origins, and to its Transverse engine configuration.

The Prototipo Cero was developed between 2004 and 2007, and was powered by a modified straight-four Volkswagen EA827 engine. This configuration allowed the vehicle to reach 200 km/h (124 mph), but Mastretta decided the vehicle needed more power. Production was originally set to begin in the first quarter of 2008, but the vehicle's release was postponed while Mastretta negotiated with several automobile manufacturers to source a more powerful engine.

=== Pre-production version ===
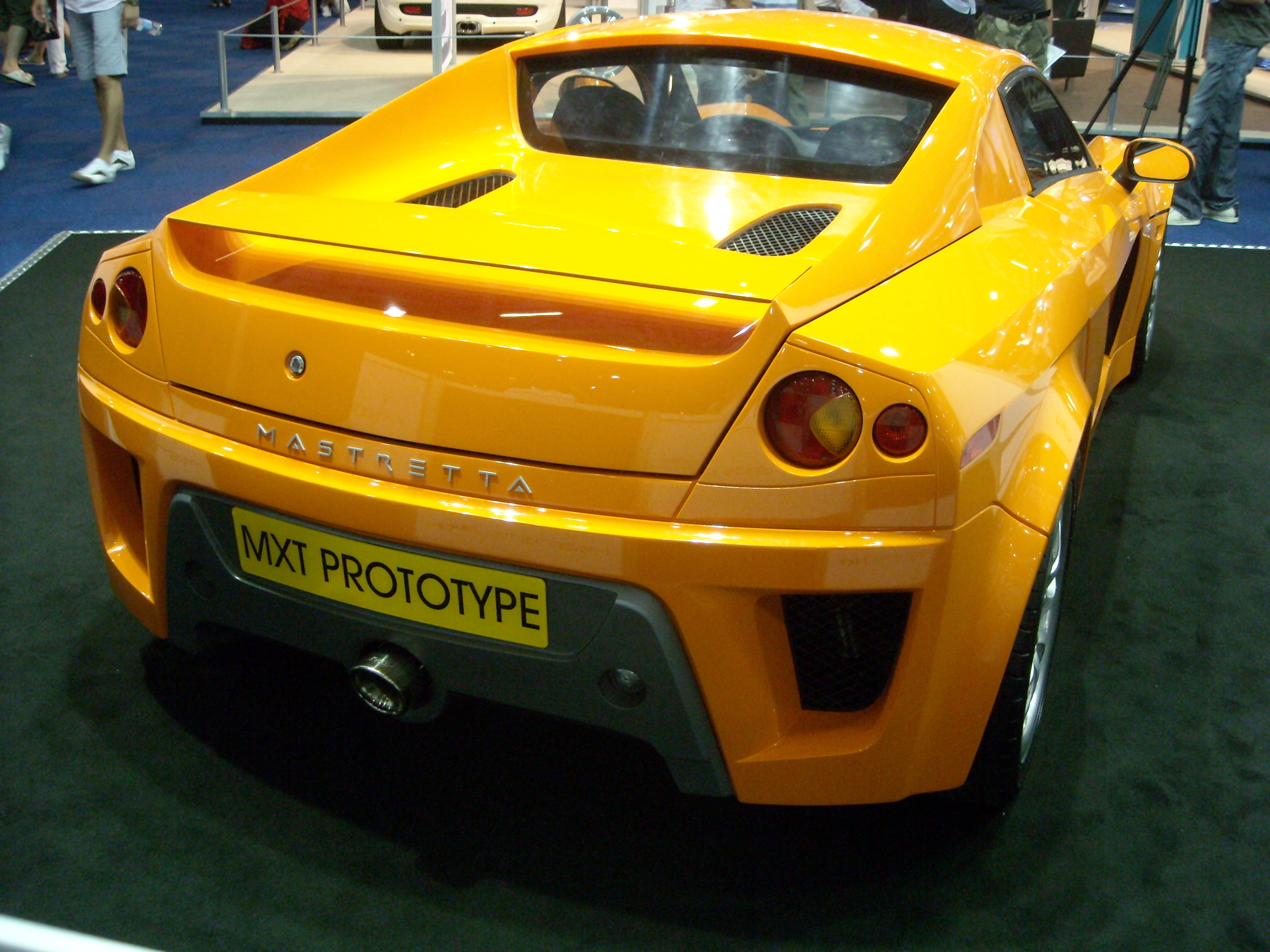
Rear view of the Mastretta MXT at the British International Motor Show.

On 22 July 2008, the Mastretta MXT was unveiled at the British International Motor Show in London. The car shown was the prototype version, but the company announced that the final production version would be significantly different, and that production specifications would be released soon.

In 2009 Mastretta revealed the specifications and equipment for the 2011 production MXT. Standard features were to include racing bucket seats and seatbelts, Hella xenon headlights, ABS brakes, a Supplemental Restraint System, 17 inch magnesium wheels, digital instrument panel, a Borla Exhaust system, an LCD based digital MP3 and CD player entertainment system, and an automatic climate control system. The vehicle's security and safety features were specifically designed to exceed EU crash and safety standards, and lead designer Daniel Mastretta reported that the vehicle was already undergoing tests to qualify for European quality and safety standards in 2009.

The 2011 production MXT was powered by a turbocharged, intercooled 2.0-liter straight-four engine with more than 240 hp (180 kW), allowing it to reach a top speed of over 230 km/h (143 mph).

Three years after its first appearance on Automóvil Panamericano, the 2011 production model MXT debuted at the 2010 Paris Motor Show on 30 September 2010. The MXT entered production on 1 January 2011 at Mastretta's new factory in the State of Mexico, with an expected 2011 production of 150 units. Around 70% (105 cars) were to be exported to Europe and the United States, and 45 were to be for domestic sales.

=== Production version ===
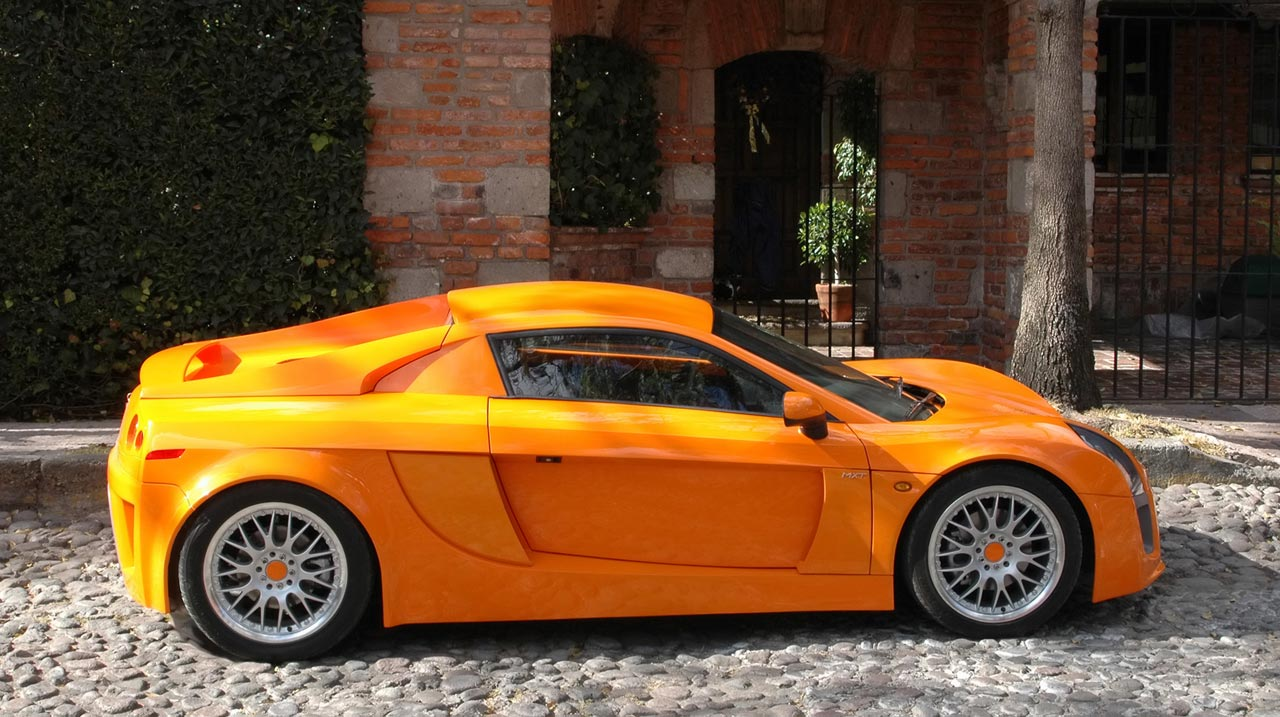
Mastretta MXT side

The 2012 Mastretta MXT was officially introduced to the international motoring press at the Los Angeles motor show in November 2011. In production, it is constructed on a tube-frame monocoque chassis, using double wishbone suspension pieces front and rear, carrying coil springs and monoshocks. Carbon-fiber body elements and aluminum elements in the chassis contribute to a low curb weight of 930 kg. The engine is Ford's Duratec inline 4-cylinder, with an announced power output of 250 PS (184 kW; 247 hp) and 348 N⋅m (257 lbf⋅ft) of torque connected to a 5-speed manual gearbox.

== Prices ==
The price for the MXT started at US$58,000 depending on options. Sales began in early 2011 in the United Kingdom and Mexico, followed by other countries including France and the U.S.

== See also ==
- Cars in Mexico
