= Daniel Mastretta =

Mexican engineer and designer (born 1953)

Juan Daniel Mastretta Guzmán (born 1953, Puebla) is a Mexican engineer and designer. In 1987 he founded Mastretta Design, a design and automotive company. Mastretta was chiefly responsible for the development of the first Mexican sports car, the Mastretta MXT, in 2008.

Daniel Mastretta trained in industrial design, and in his early career worked primarily in furniture and packaging design and in the design of public spaces. However, his primary work has been in the public transport sector. One of the founders of the Mexican design companies, Tecnoidea and CV/Tecnosport, he has been the chief designer of 17 different models of buses (both in Mexico and abroad). In 1997 he was awarded the Premio al Mérito Profesional in design by the Colegio de Diseñadores Industriales y Gráficos de México (College of Industrial and Graphic Designers of Mexico).
