= Grupo Industrial Ramirez =

Automotive Company of Mexico

- Industry: Automotive
- Founded: 1946
- Fate: Still Unknown
- Headquarters: Monterrey, Mexico
- Key people: Gregorio Ramirez Gonzalez, founder
- Products: Automobiles, Trucks, Trailers, Buses

Grupo Industrial Ramirez was the first Mexican automotive company and also the first Mexican company to ever produce pickup trucks and vans.

== History ==
The company was started in 1946 by Gregorio Ramirez Gonzalez, with a small shop to reconstruct dry van trailers. It later grew into a larger corporation with a full list of products in which he invited his brothers to participate.

Trailers de Monterrey

The flagship of the Corporation was Trailers de Monterrey, which began as a dry van fabricator and grew into making trucks and buses under the Ramírez and Sultana brands.

Industria Automotriz

In 1957 Industria Automotriz, S.A. was established, manufacturing rims, stampings, assembly and sub assembly.

Berg de Mexico

In 1964 Berg de Mexico, S.A was established to produce air brakes for heavy vehicles. In 1982 it was renamed to Industrias Vortec, S.A.

Holding company

By 1978 Grupo Industrial Ramirez was established as a holding company, controlling all of the group's interests.

== Products ==
- Rural Ramirez Pick Up
- Ramirez Truck
- Sultana Buses
- Ramirez Trailer
- Rims
- Wheels
- Assembly for Automotive Industry
