= EInfochips =

Engineering and design services company

eInfochips
- Type: Subsidiary
- Industry: Product engineering; Semiconductor design; Embedded systems
- Founded: 1994 or 1995
- Headquarters: San Jose, California, United States; Ahmedabad, Gujarat, India
- Key people: Pratul Krishnakant Shroff (former CEO)
- Products: Semiconductor and ASIC design, embedded software, IoT engineering, digital engineering, system validation
- Parent: Arrow Electronics (since 2018)
- Website: www.einfochips.com

eInfochips is a product engineering and semiconductor design services company that provides engineering solutions across industries including automotive, industrial, aerospace, healthcare, and consumer electronics. Originally founded in 1994 by former Intel chip designer Pratul Shroff, it was acquired by Arrow Electronics in 2018.

== History ==
eInfochips was founded in India in the 1995 as a product engineering services firm and later expanded its operations internationally. In 2009, the company acquired nGIN Technologies to strengthen its embedded systems and networking capabilities. In January 2018, Arrow Electronics announced the acquisition of eInfochips as part of its strategy to expand engineering services and Internet of Things (IoT) capabilities.

== Partnerships ==
eInfochips has collaborated with semiconductor and technology companies on engineering and reference design initiatives. Reported collaborations include work with Samsung Foundry, Qualcomm, Infineon, Taoglas, Microchip (Microsemi), Dukosi, NxP, and others on semiconductor, wireless, automotive, and edge-AI solutions. In April 2026, eInfochips introduced the EIC PROPEL, its enterprise IoT platform in the Microsoft Marketplace.
