= Geography of the state of Hidalgo =

Location of Hidalgo in the Mexican territory

Map of the state of Hidalgo

The geography of the State of Hidalgo refers to the physical geography and human geography of Hidalgo, a state in central Mexico.

Hidalgo is located in the eastern part of Mexico. To the north, it borders San Luis Potosí and Veracruz; to the east, it borders Puebla; to the south it borders Tlaxcala and the State of Mexico. It is made up of 84 municipalities.

According to INEGI, Hidalgo has an area of 20,813.57 km^{2}, making up 1.06% of the total area of Mexico. (Note: According to the Government of Hidalgo its area is 20,987 km^{2}.) It is the 6th smallest state by area — ahead of Querétaro, Colima, Aguascalientes, Morelos, and Tlaxcala. The largest municipality within Hidalgo is Zimapán (with an area of 872.24 km^{2}), (Note: According to the Government of Hidalgo its area is 860.9 km^{2}; and according to the SEDESOL it is 874,682 km^{2}.) and its smallest municipality is Tlahuelilpan (with an area of 28.18 km^{2}). (Note: According to the Government of Hidalgo its area is 31.3 km^{2}; according to the INAFED is 28.60 km^{2}; and according to the SEDESOL it is 28,265 km^{2}.)

== Geographical regions ==
=== Characteristics ===
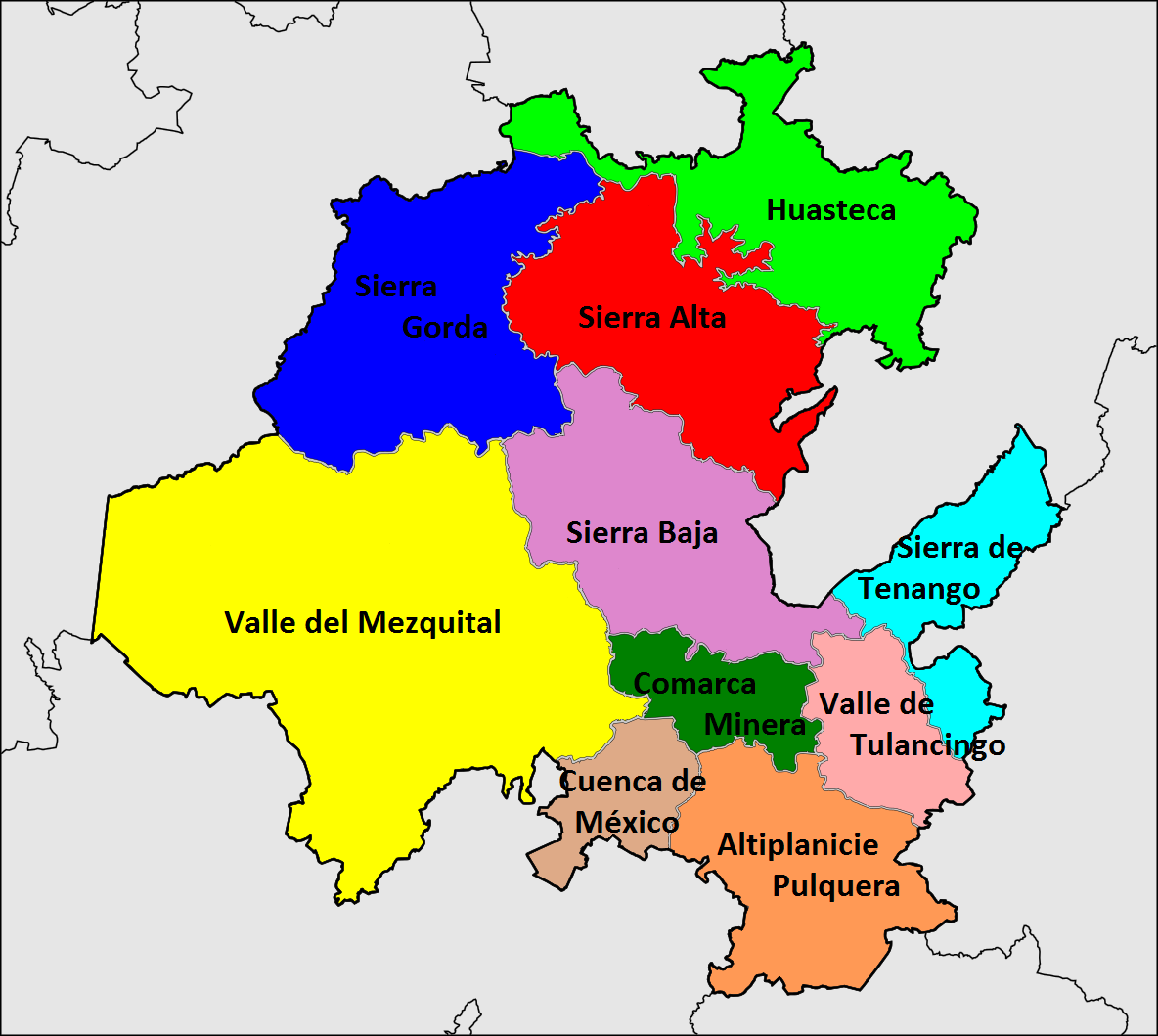
Geographical regions of the state of Hidalgo

The state of Hidalgo has significant geographical diversity, featuring an extensive variety of flora and fauna and a wide range of climatic and geomorphological conditions. From north to south, the state is split into three distinct regions: the Northern Gulf Coastal Plain, which has the lowest altitude, the Eastern Mother Sierra, which has a medium altitude, and the Neovolcanic Axis, which has the highest altitude in the state.

The state has been divided into ten cultural regions that group similar municipalities. The cultural characteristics of each region are influenced by its geographical features, which directly affect the social and economic situation of its inhabitants.

The Huasteca region is located in the coastal plains in the northwestern portion of the state. The Huasteca is a long and narrow strip of abundant vegetation, with mostly flat terrain except for some small hills.

The Sierra Madre Oriental is a mountainous region that runs through the center of the state, in a southeast–northwest direction. Municipalities in this central area are grouped into four cultural regions: Sierra Gorda, Sierra Alta, Sierra Baja, and Sierra de Tenango. The Sierra Alta and Sierra Gorda are known for their very rugged landscape and sharp mountain peaks, compared to the relatively smaller elevations of the Sierra de Tenango (also called Sierra Otomí-Tepehua). The Sierra Baja has plains that seem to sink through its canyons and ravines.

In the southern Neovolcanic Axis lies the central Mining Valley, the Tulancingo Valley and the Altiplanicie pulquera to the southeast, the Mezquital Valley to the west, and the Cuenca de México to the south. The Mining Region is an area rich in deposits of metals such as lead, gold and silver. The Tulancingo Valley is a large valley that may have formerly been the basin of a lake, and is characterized by the presence of volcanic rock formations. The Altiplanicie pulquera, also known as the plains of Apan, is a highland with three lake areas, called the lagoons of Tochac-Atocha and Apan. The area is known for its agriculture, and produces a popular agave wine called maguey pulque. The Basin of Mexico, also called the Pachuca-Tizayuca Valley, is a semi-arid plain protected by a chain of hills on each side. The Mezquital Valley is an extremely arid region, made up of valleys and plains with isolated volcanic mountains and basaltic spills.

=== Delimitation ===
The number of regions that make up the state of Hidalgo is a matter of some debate. Some sources combine the Sierra Alta and the Sierra Baja into a single region called the Sierra Hidalguense. Likewise, the Tulancingo Valley, the Mining Region, the Altiplanicie pulquera, and the Basin of Mexico are sometimes combined into a single region called the Altiplano Hidalguense. The Sierra de Tenango can be confused with the slopes that go down to the Huasteca; sometimes it is referred to as part of the Sierra Norte de Puebla and other times as part of the Sierra de Huayacocotla. The Acaxochitlán is sometimes named as part of the Totonacapan region.

The Huasteca is a multicultural region that includes the southern part of the state of Tamaulipas, the north of Veracruz, the east of San Luis Potosí, the north of Hidalgo, and the north of Querétaro. Within Hidalgo the Huasteca comprises the municipalities in the northwest of the state. Some sources extend the borders of the region south, to include the municipalities of Molango de Escamilla, Metztitlán, Zacualtipán de Ángeles, parts of the municipality of Huasca de Ocampo, and the northern portion of Sierra de Tenango up to Puebla.

The Basin of Mexico is an endorheic basin formed by a large system of lakes: Chalco, Xochimilco, Texcoco, San Cristóbal-Xaltocan. The region is made up of four valleys, the Valley of Mexico, Valley of Cuautitlán, Valley of Apan and the Pachuca-Tizayuca Valley. It comprises four federal entities: the state of Mexico, Mexico City, Hidalgo and Tlaxcala.

The Sierra Gorda originates in Hidalgo as a branch of the Sierra Madre Oriental and extends to San Luis Potosí, after crossing Querétaro and Guanajuato.

The Mezquital Valley extends to the northern part of the state of Mexico and a limited area of the southeast of the state of Querétaro.

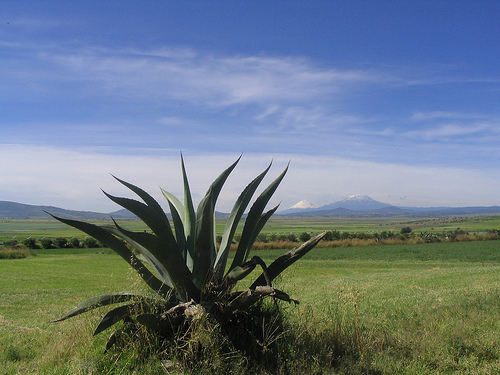
Municipality of Apan in the Valley of Apan

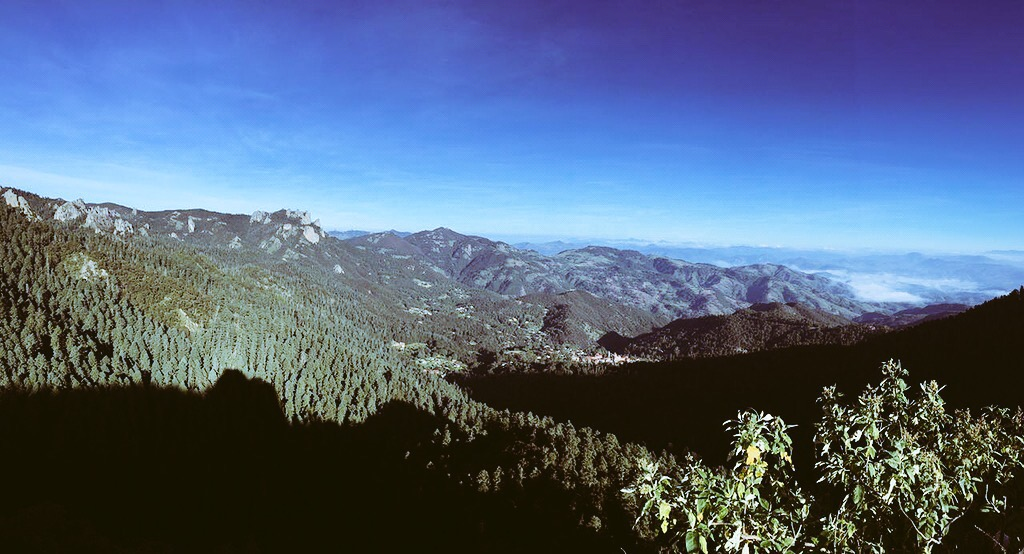
Municipality of Mineral del Chico in the Mining Mine

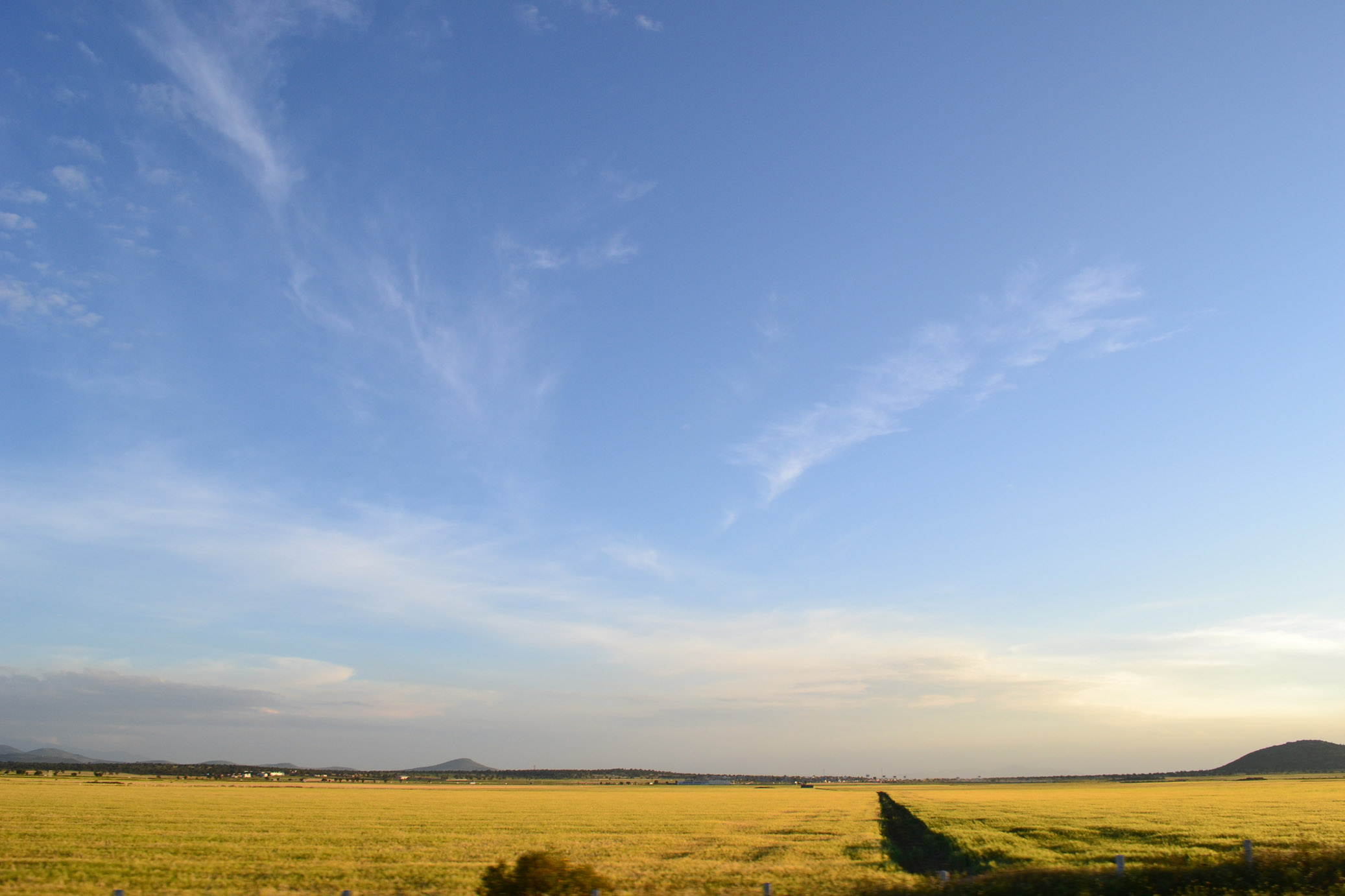
Municipality of Tizayuca in the Basin of Mexico

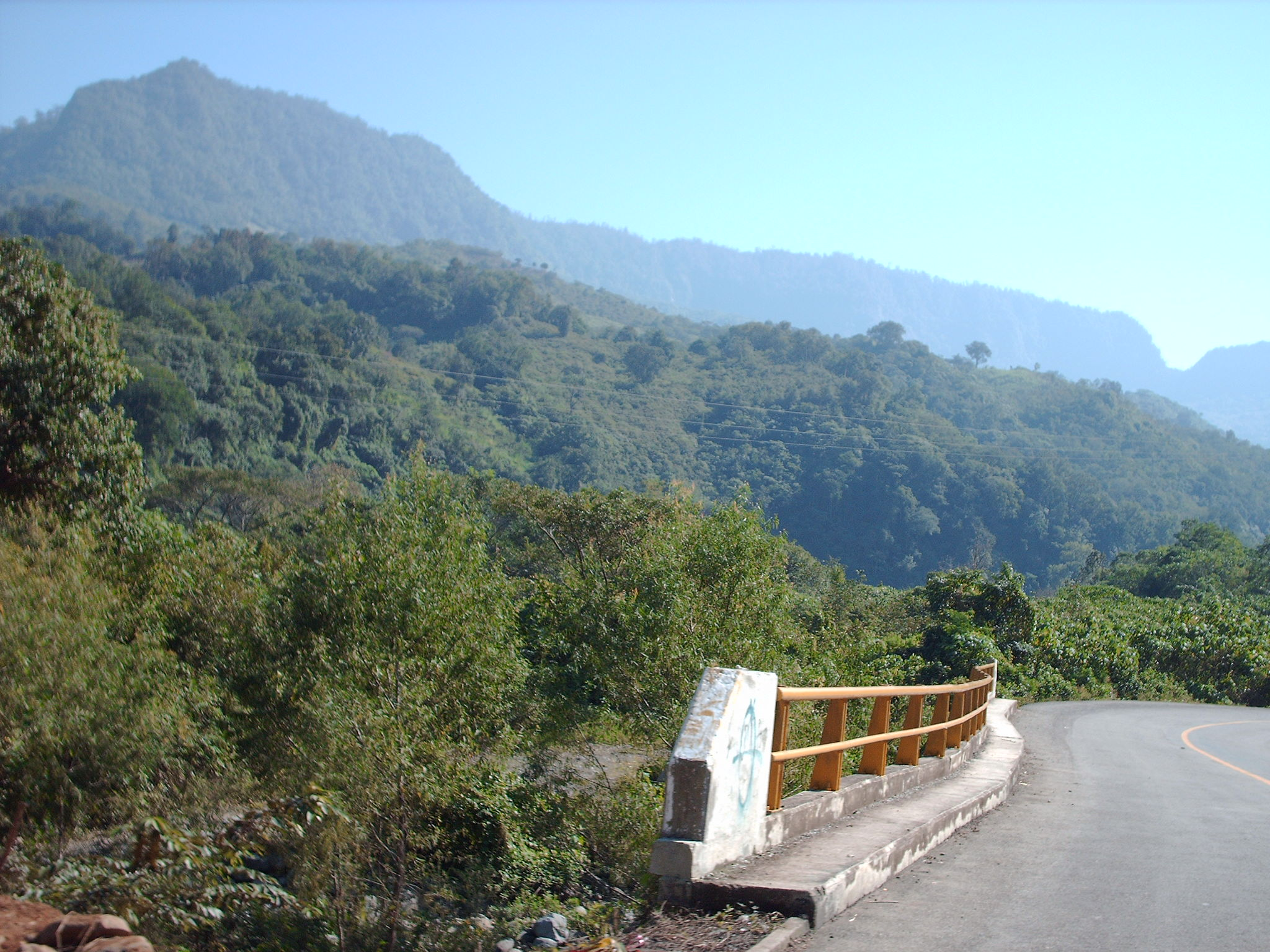
Municipality of San Felipe Orizatlán in the Huasteca

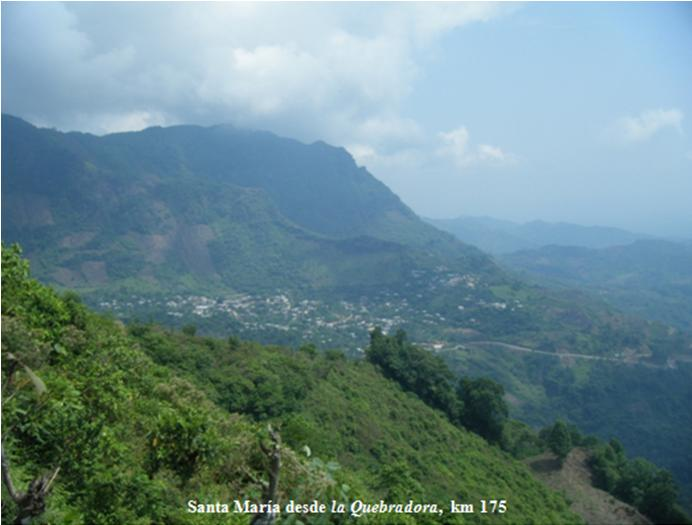
Tlanchinol in the Sierra Alta

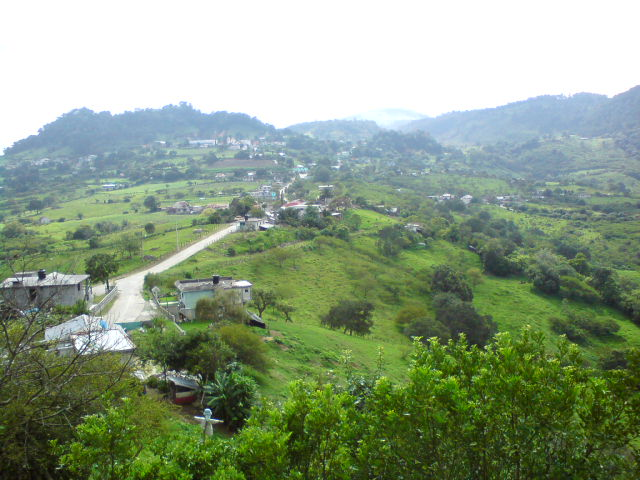
Municipality of Juárez, Hidalgo in the Sierra Baja

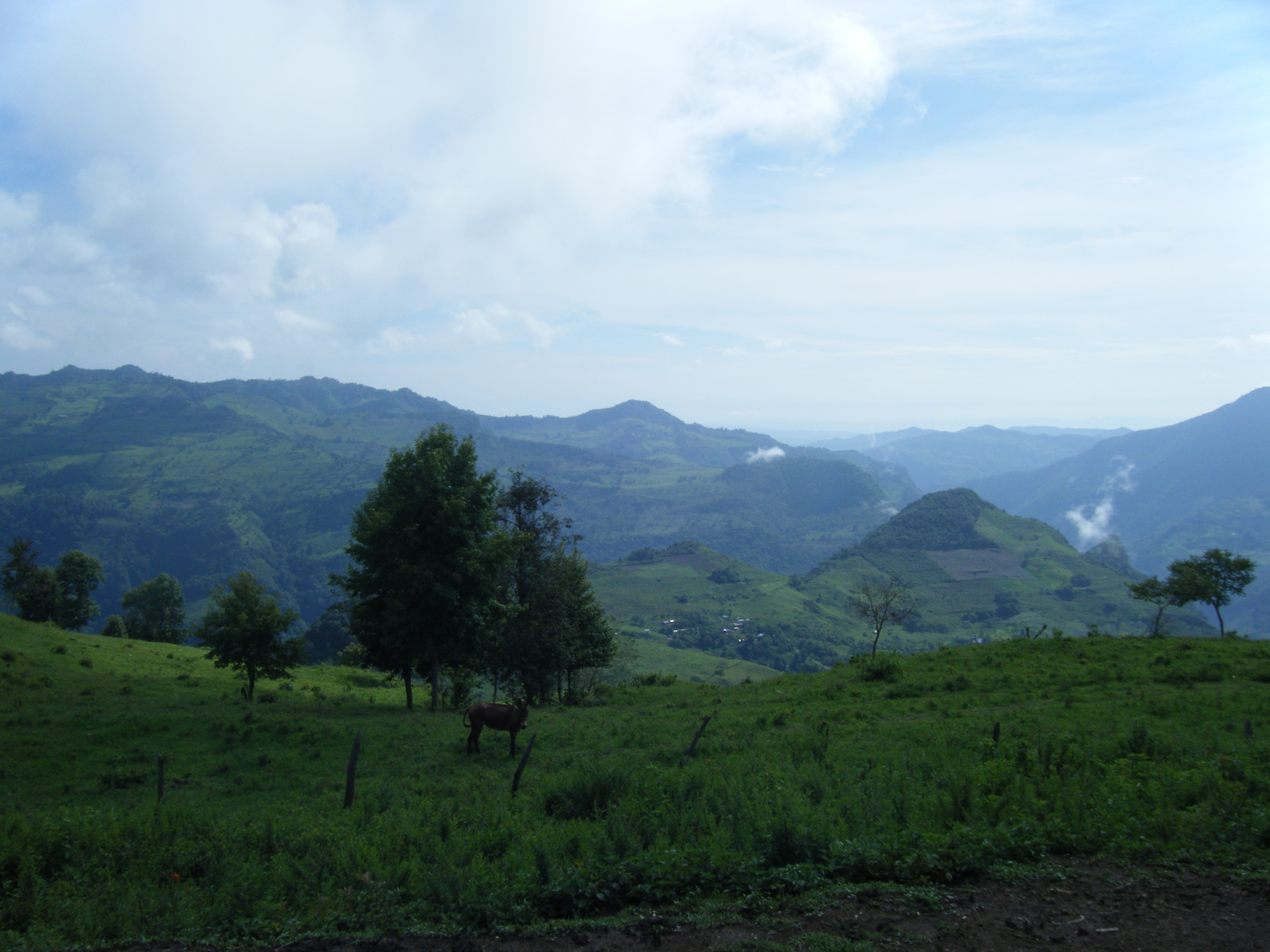
Municipality of San Bartolo Tutotepec in the Sierra de Tenango

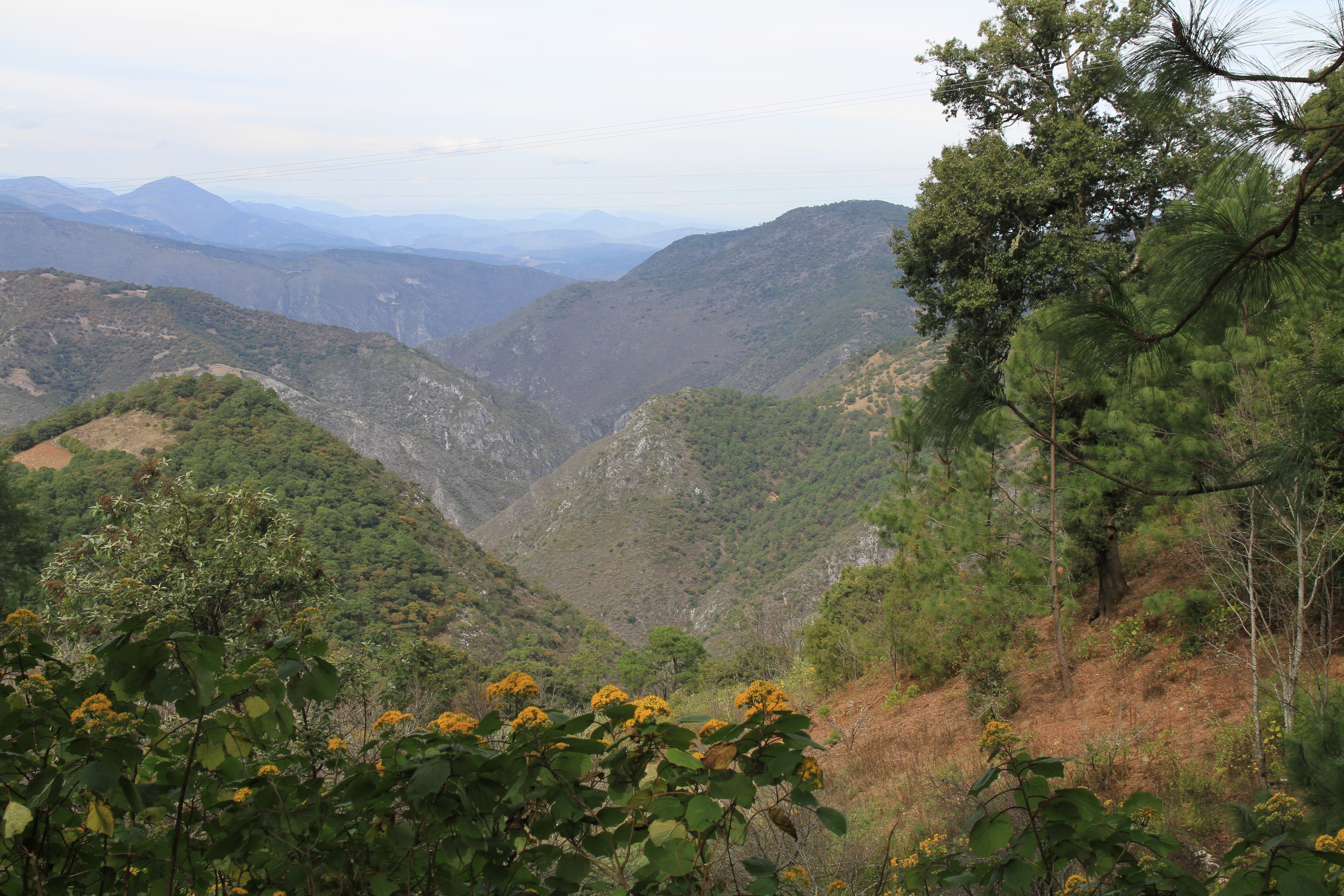
Municipality of Zimapán in the Sierra Gorda

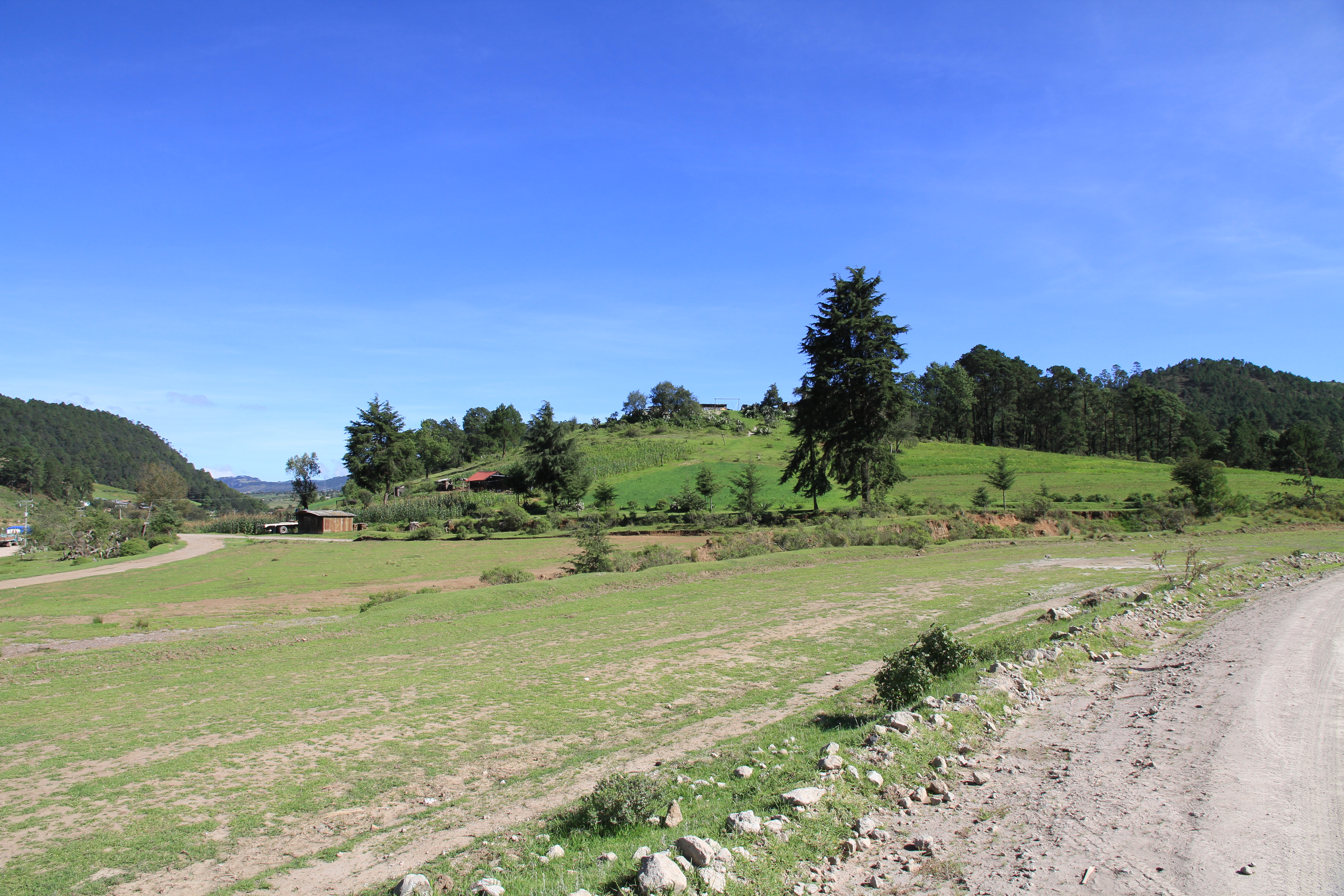
Cuautepec de Hinojosa in the Tulancingo Valley

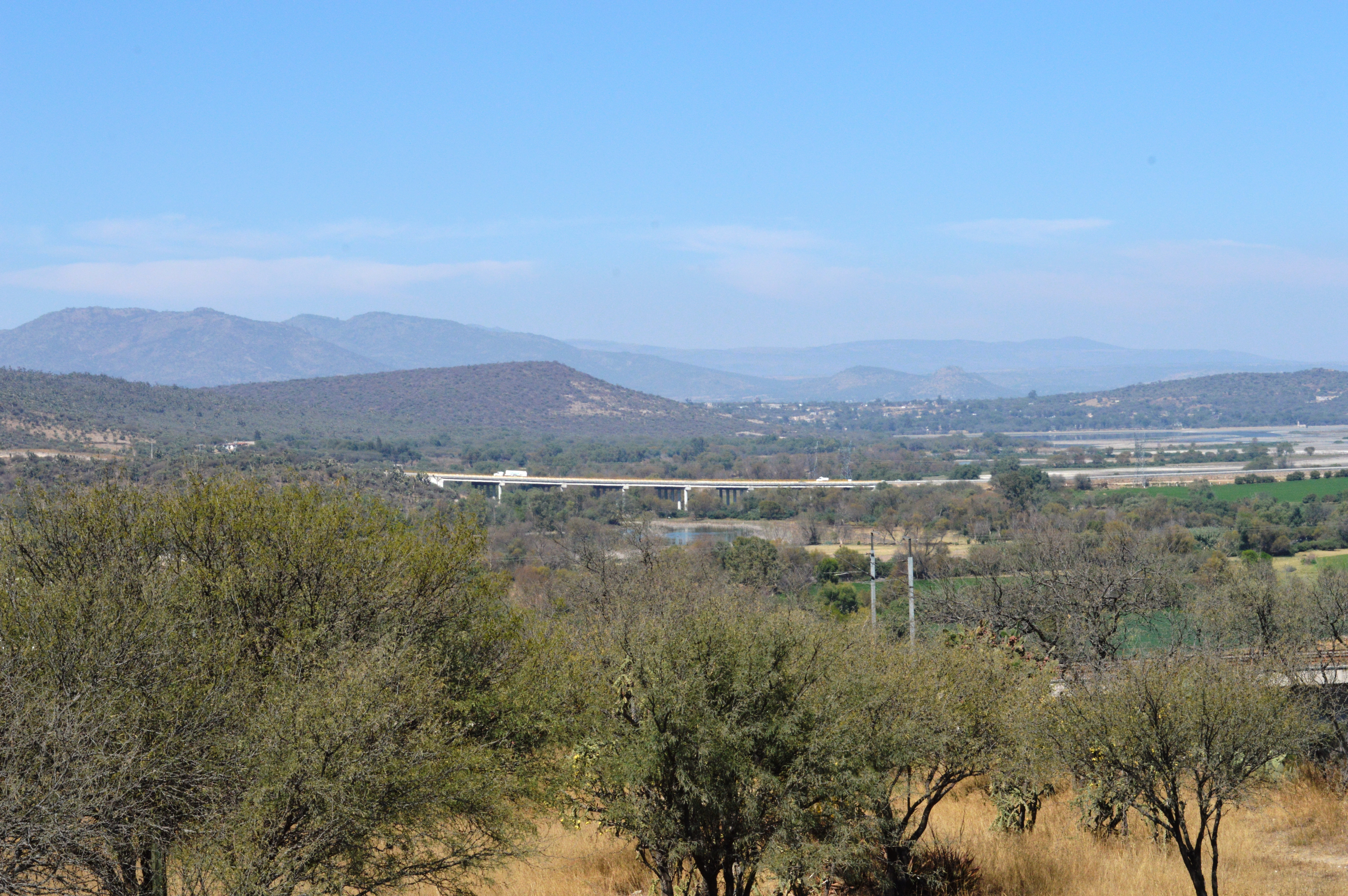
Tula de Allende in the Mezquital Valley

== Climatology ==
=== Climate ===
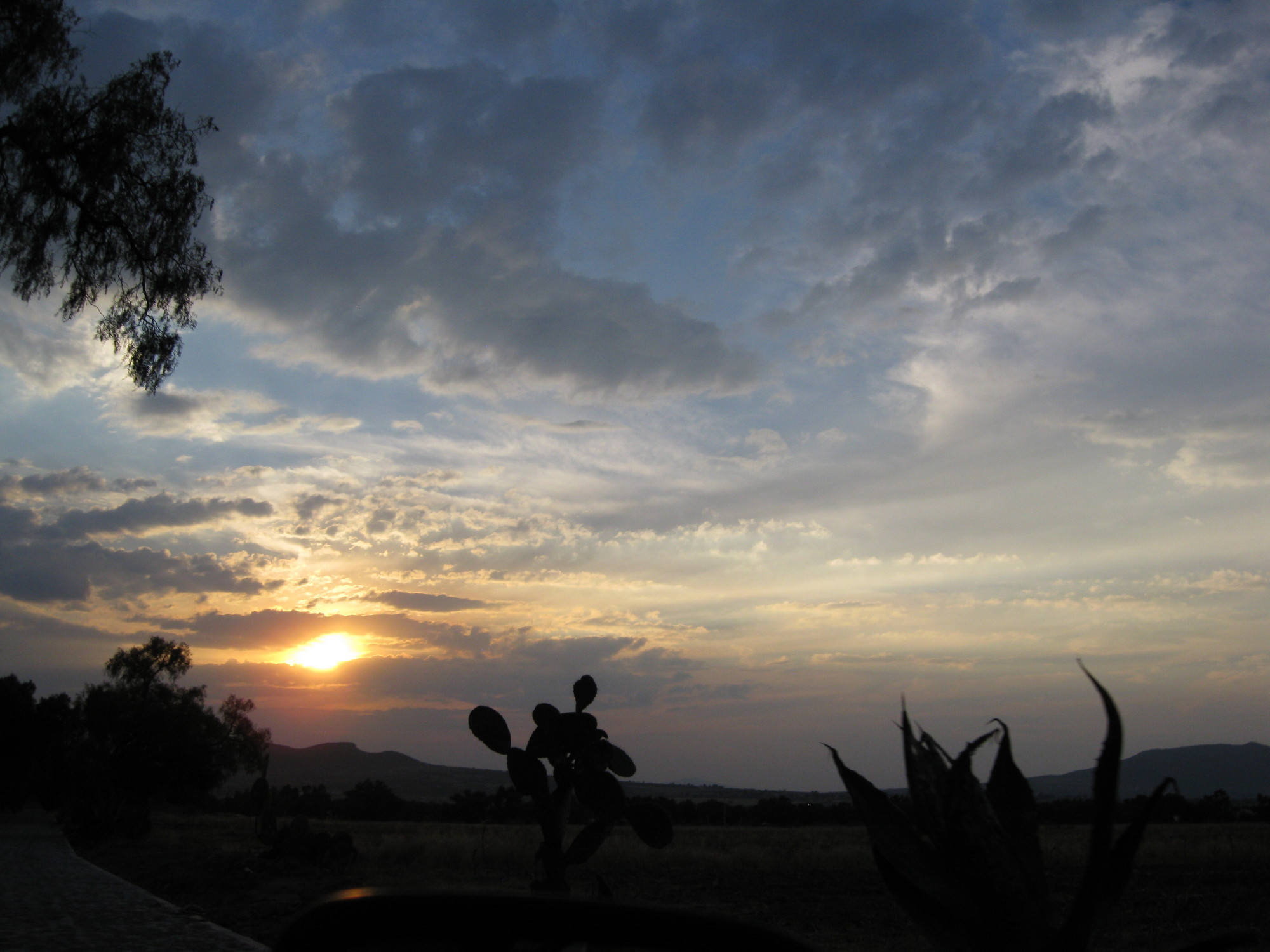
Sunset in Xihuingo, municipality of Tepeapulco

Hidalgo has three well-defined climatic zones: a warm or semi-warm zone, a temperate zone, and a dry or semi-dry zone. Some areas of higher altitude have a semi-cold climate.

Average annual climate parameters of Hidalgo (1951–2010)
Stational lap	Municipality	Altitude (m. s. n. m.)	Temperature (°C)			Precipitation (mm)
Stational lap	Municipality	Altitude (m. s. n. m.)	Minimum (average)	Median	Maximum (average)	Precipitation (mm)
00013011	Huejutla de Reyes	150.0	17.3	23.7	30.1	1469.7
00013038	Tlanchinol	1365.0	13.4	17.6	21.8	2416.2
00013034	Tenango de Doria	1666.0	11.6	17.0	22.5	1733.7
00013074	Ixmiquilpan	1700.0	8.8	17.7	26.6	342.4
00013050	Zacualtipán de Ángeles	1980.0	8.5	13.6	18.8	1287.3
00013056	Pachuca de Soto	2368.0	6.6	14.0	21.4	411.9
00013115	Mineral del Monte	2812.0	7.5	13.0	18.5	870.7
Fuente: Servicio Meteorológico Nacional.

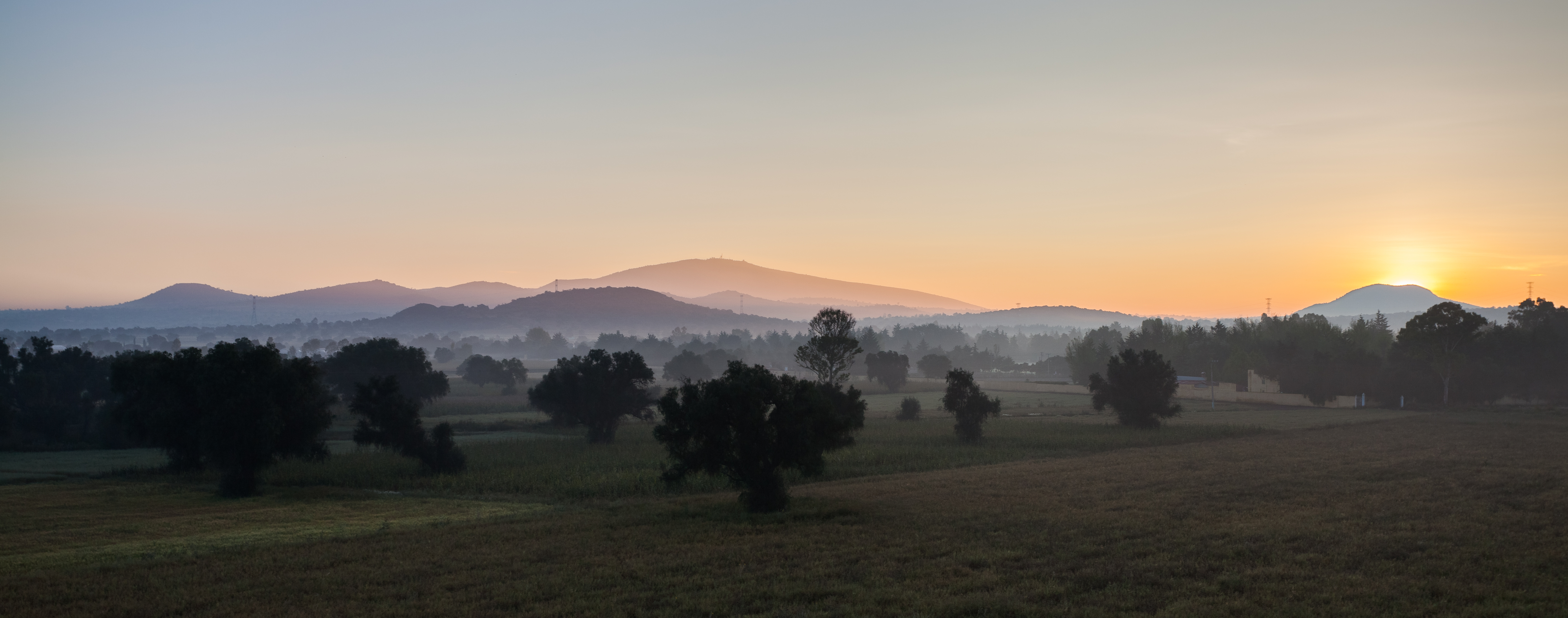
Sunrise in Huitzila, municipality of Tizayuca

== See also ==
- Geography of Mexico
