= Omar Fayad =

Former governor of Hidalgo, Mexico

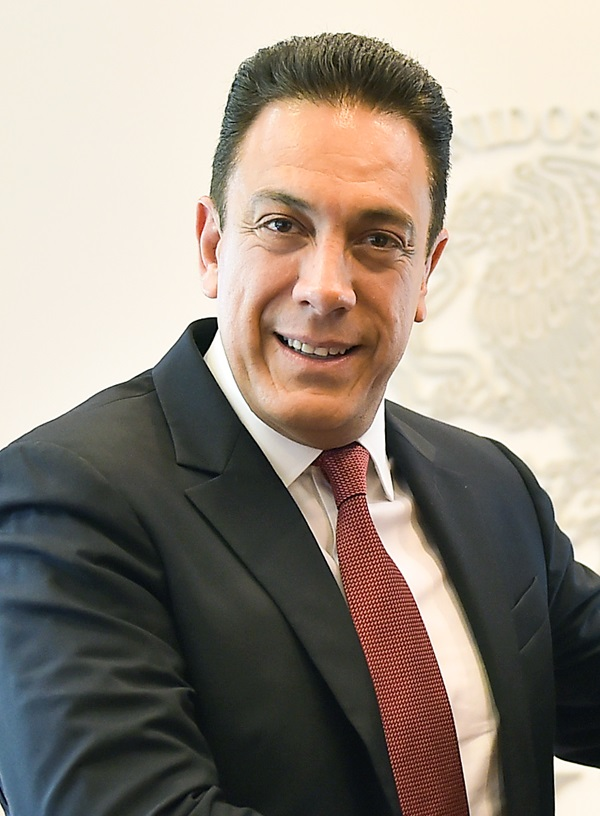

Governor of Hidalgo
- In office 5 September 2016 – 4 September 2022
- Preceded by: Francisco Olvera Ruiz
- Succeeded by: Julio Menchaca

Member of the Chamber of Deputies for Hidalgo's 1st district
- In office 1 September 2009 – 31 August 2012
- Preceded by: Joel Guerrero Juárez
- Succeeded by: Darío Badillo Ramírez

Personal details
- Born: Omar Fayad Meneses; 26 August 1962 (age 62); Zempoala, Hidalgo, Mexico
- Political party: Institutional Revolutionary Party
- Spouse: Victoria Ruffo (m. 2001)
- Children: 2
- Education: National Autonomous University of Mexico (LLB)
- Occupation: Lawyer

Omar Fayad Meneses (born 26 August 1962) is a Mexican politician from the state of Hidalgo who has served as a federal deputy and senator. He served as the Governor of Hidalgo from 2016 to 2022. He is a member of the Institutional Revolutionary Party.

== Political career ==
Fayad was born on 26 August 1962 in Zempoala, Hidalgo, to a Lebanese father and a Mexican mother. He obtained his law degree from the National Autonomous University of Mexico (UNAM) in 1985. After his graduation, he worked in Attorney General of Mexico's office for several years. In 1989, he moved to the National Institute of Penal Sciences (INACIPE) and later served at various education posts in the state of Hidalgo. He served as Hidalgo's secretary of public education and attorney general during 1996–98. He then served in several public safety and security capacities, including as a police commissioner or customs administrator. He also made regular appearances on radio programs as a political analyst.

In 2000, Fayad was elected to the LVIII Legislature as a federal deputy for Hidalgo's seventh district, serving as secretary of Special Commission on Public Safety and sitting on the Communications, Government and Public Safety Committees. He resigned in April 2003.

After his brief spell in Congress, Fayad returned to the Hidalgo state government, serving as Secretary of Agriculture (2003–05) and Secretary of Social Development (2005–06). In 2006, he ran for and won the municipal presidency of Pachuca. During his mayoral spell, he presided over Mexico's association of mayors.

In 2009, Fayad returned to Congress, representing Hidalgo's first district; during that term, he served as parliamentary secretary of the Commission of Strengthening Federalism. Three years later, he ran and won a campaign for Senate, where he would serve in the LXII and LXIII Legislatures. He served on an array of commissions, including Public Safety, which he presided.

In 2010, Fayad was selected as the leader of the Institutional Revolutionary Party in Hidalgo. Fayad was strongly criticized in October 2015 when he attempted to introduce a new law against cybercrime that also criminalized the freedom of expression. One organization billed it "the worst Internet-related bill in history".

On 2 February 2016, Fayad left the Senate in order to seek the PRI nomination for Governor of Hidalgo. He won the gubernatorial election later that year and was sworn-in as governor on 5 September 2016.

== Personal life ==
He married actress Victoria Ruffo in 2000. The couple have two children. During Fayad's term as municipal president of Pachuca, he designated Ruffo as the local director of the National System of Integrity and Familial Development.

In February 2016, Fayad was hospitalized after suffering an anaphylactic shock triggered by Rocephin.

In March 2020 he was confirmed to be infected with COVID-19.

== See also ==
- List of presidents of Pachuca Municipality
