= 1st federal electoral district of Hidalgo =

Federal electoral district of Mexico

Hidalgo's 1st
- Electoral district of the Chamber of Deputies of Mexico

- 1st district since 2023

Incumbent
- Member: Daniel Andrade Zurutuza
- Party: ▌Morena
- Congress: 66th (2024–2027)

District
- State: Hidalgo
- Head town: Huejutla de Reyes
- Coordinates: 21°08′N 98°25′W
- Covers: 18 municipalities: Atlapexco, Calnali, Eloxochitlán, Huautla, Huazalingo, Huejutla, Jaltocan, Juárez Hidalgo, Lolotla, Molango de Escamilla, San Felipe Orizatlán, Tepehuacán de Guerrero, Tianguistengo, Tlanchinol, Xochiatipan, Xochicoatlán, Yahualica, Zacualtipán de Ángeles
- PR region: Fourth
- Precincts: 321
- Population: 443,425 (2020 census)
- Indigenous: Yes (81%)

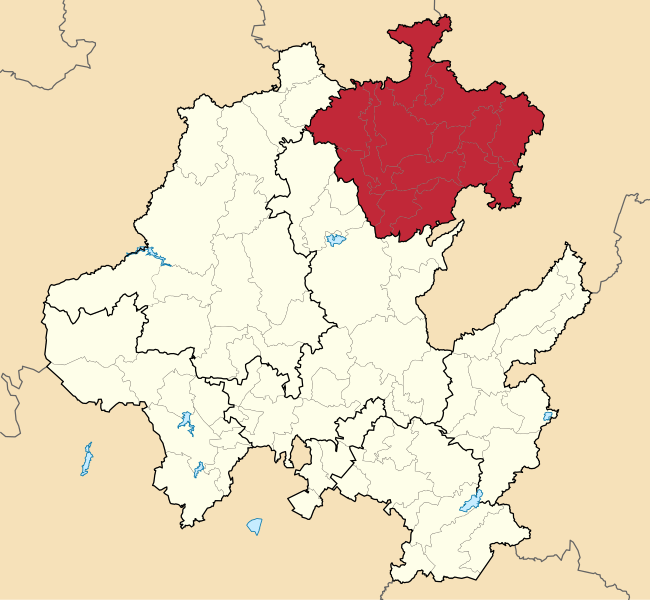
1st district in 2017–2022

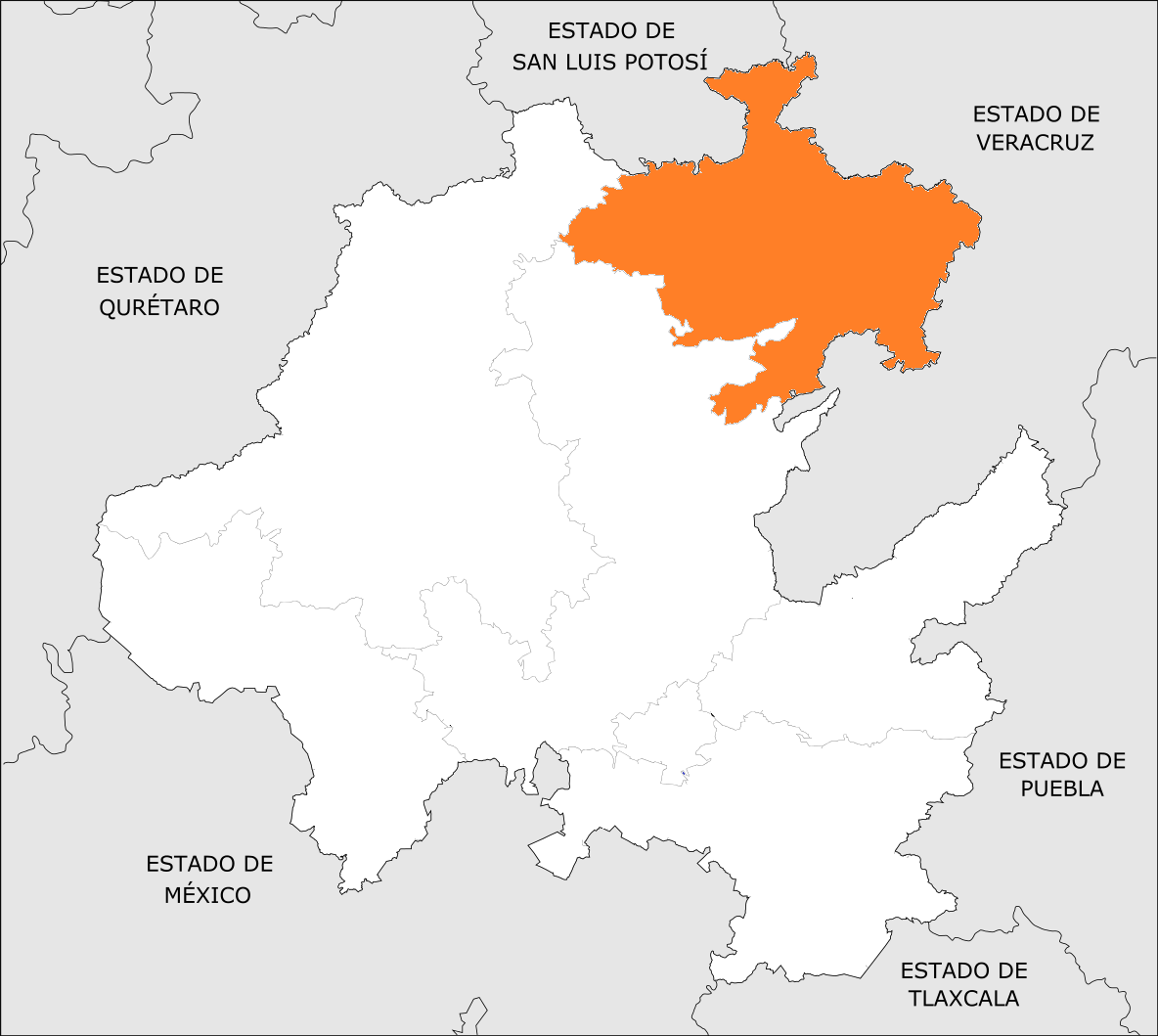
1st district in 2005–2017

The 1st federal electoral district of Hidalgo (Spanish: Distrito electoral federal 01 de Hidalgo) is one of the 300 electoral districts into which Mexico is divided for elections to the federal Chamber of Deputies and one of seven such districts in the state of Hidalgo.

It elects one deputy to the lower house of Congress for each three-year legislative period by means of the first-past-the-post system. Votes cast in the district also count towards the calculation of proportional representation ("plurinominal") deputies elected from the fourth region. (Note: Between 2005 and 2023, Hidalgo was assigned to the fifth region.)

The current member for the district, elected in the 2024 general election, is Daniel Andrade Zurutuza of the National Regeneration Movement (Morena).

== District territory ==
Under the 2023 districting plan adopted by the National Electoral Institute (INE), which is to be used for the 2024, 2027 and 2030 federal elections, the 1st district's head town (cabecera distrital), where results from individual polling stations are gathered together and tallied, is the city of Huejutla de Reyes in the extreme north-east of the state.

The district covers 321 electoral precincts (secciones electorales) across 18 of the state's municipalities:

- Atlapexco, Calnali, Eloxochitlán, Huautla, Huazalingo, Huejutla, Jaltocan, Juárez Hidalgo, Lolotla, Molango de Escamilla, San Felipe Orizatlán, Tepehuacán de Guerrero, Tianguistengo, Tlanchinol, Xochiatipan, Xochicoatlán, Yahualica and Zacualtipán de Ángeles.

The district reported a population of 443,425 in the 2020 census and, with Indigenous and Afrodescendent inhabitants accounting for over 81% of that total, it is classified by the INE as an indigenous district. (Note: The INE deems any local or federal electoral district where Indigenous or Afrodescendent inhabitants number 40% or more of the total population to be an indigenous district.)

== Previous districting schemes ==
Evolution of electoral district numbers
	1974	1978	1996	2005	2017	2023
Hidalgo	5	6	7	7	7	7
Chamber of Deputies	196	300				

2017–2022

Under the 2017 plan, the district covered 15 municipalities in the same part of the state:
- Atlapexco, Calnali, Huautla, Huazalingo, Huejutla, Jaltocan, Lolotla, Molango de Escamilla, San Felipe Orizatlán, Tepehuacán de Guerrero, Tianguistengo, Tlanchinol, Xochiatipan, Xochicoatlán and Yahualica.
Thus, the municipalities of the 2023–2030 district, minus Eloxochitlán, Juárez Hidalgo and Zacualtipán.

2005–2017

Between 2005 and 2017, it comprised 13 municipalities in the same part of the state:
- Atlapexco, Calnali, Huautla, Huazalingo, Huejutla, Jaltocan, Lolotla, San Felipe Orizatlán, Tepehuacán de Guerrero, Tianguistengo, Tlanchinol, Xochiatipan and Yahualica.
That is, the 2017 district minus Molango and Xochicoatlán.

1996–2005

The 1996 redistricting process created Hidalgo's 7th district. The 1st district covered 14 municipalities in the same part of the state as in the later plans:
- Atlapexco, Calnali, Huautla, Huazalingo, Huejutla, Jaltocan, Lolotla, Molango de Escamilla, San Felipe Orizatlán, Tepehuacán de Guerrero, Tianguistengo, Tlanchinol, Xochiatipan and Yahualica.
The only change compared to the 2005 configuration was the inclusion of Molango.

1978–1996

The districting scheme in force from 1978 to 1996 was the result of the 1977 electoral reforms, which increased the number of single-member seats in the Chamber of Deputies from 196 to 300. Under that plan, Hidalgo's seat allocation rose from five to six. The 1st district's head town was at the state capital, Pachuca, and it comprised 12 nearby municipalities:
- Emiliano Zapata, Epazoyucan, Mineral de la Reforma, Pachuca, San Agustín Tlaxiaca, Tepeapulco, Tezontepec, Tizayuca, Tlanalapa, Tolcayuca, Zapotlán de Juárez and Zempoala.

== Deputies returned to Congress ==
(Mexico) National parties
- Current
- PAN
- PRI
- PT
- PVEM
- MC
- Morena
- PAZ
- Somos
- Defunct or local only
- PLM
- PNR
- PRM
- PNM
- PP
- PPS
- PARM
- PFCRN
- CON
- PANAL
- PSD
- PES
- PES
- PRD

Hidalgo's 1st district
Election	Deputy	Party	Term	Legislature
1916	Antonio Guerrero		1916–1917	Constituent Congress of Querétaro
1917	Efrén Rebolledo		1917–1918	27th Congress
1918	Efrén Rebolledo		1918–1920	28th Congress
1920	Rafael López Serrano		1920–1922	29th Congress
1922	Enrique Trejo Martínez		1922–1924	30th Congress
1924	Damerino Castro		1924–1926	31st Congress
1926	Juan Manuel Delgado		1926–1928	32nd Congress
1928	Ernesto P. Sánchez		1928–1930	33rd Congress
1930	José Rivera		1930–1932	34th Congress
1932	Carlos Velázquez Méndez	Institutional Revolutionary Party	1932–1934	35th Congress
1934	José A. Lara		1934–1937	36th Congress
1937	Daniel C. Santillán	Institutional Revolutionary Party	1937–1940	37th Congress
1940	José Pérez Jr.		1940–1943	38th Congress
1943	Daniel Olguín Díaz	Institutional Revolutionary Party	1943–1946	39th Congress
1946	David Cabrera Villagrán	Institutional Revolutionary Party	1946–1949	40th Congress
1949	Jorge Viesca y Palma	Institutional Revolutionary Party	1949–1952	41st Congress
1952	Librado Gutiérrez	Institutional Revolutionary Party	1952–1955	42nd Congress
1955	Julián Rodríguez Adame	Institutional Revolutionary Party	1955–1958	43rd Congress
1958	Andrés Mannig Valenzuela	Institutional Revolutionary Party	1958–1961	44th Congress
1961	Jorge Quiroz Sánchez	Institutional Revolutionary Party	1961–1964	45th Congress
1964	Humberto Velasco Avilés	Institutional Revolutionary Party	1964–1967	46th Congress
1967	Adalberto Cravioto Meneses	Institutional Revolutionary Party	1967–1970	47th Congress
1970	Darío Pérez González	Institutional Revolutionary Party	1970–1973	48th Congress
1973	Rafael Cravioto Muñoz	Institutional Revolutionary Party	1973–1976	49th Congress
1976	Ladislao Castillo Feregrino	Institutional Revolutionary Party	1976–1979	50th Congress
1979	Adolfo Castelán Flores	Institutional Revolutionary Party	1979–1982	51st Congress
1982	Juan Mariano Acoltzin Vidal	Institutional Revolutionary Party	1982–1985	52nd Congress
1985	Germán Corona del Rosal	Institutional Revolutionary Party	1985–1988	53rd Congress
1988	Estela Rojas de Soto	Institutional Revolutionary Party	1988–1991	54th Congress
1991	Julieta Guevara Bautista	Institutional Revolutionary Party	1991–1994	55th Congress
1994	Mario Alberto Viornery Mendoza	Institutional Revolutionary Party	1994–1997	56th Congress
1997	Orlando Arvizu Lara	Institutional Revolutionary Party	1997–2000	57th Congress
2000	Carolina Viggiano Austria (Note: Viggiano Austria resigned her seat on 18 June 2002. Hernández Hernández, her alternate, was sworn in on 30 August 2002.); Juan Alonso Hernández Hernández	Institutional Revolutionary Party	2000–2002; 2002–2003	58th Congress
2003	Emilio Badillo Ramírez	Institutional Revolutionary Party	2003–2006	59th Congress
2006	Joel Guerrero Juárez	Institutional Revolutionary Party	2006–2009	60th Congress
2009	Omar Fayad Meneses	Institutional Revolutionary Party	2009–2012	61st Congress
2012	Darío Badillo Ramírez	Institutional Revolutionary Party	2012–2015	62nd Congress
2015	Carolina Viggiano Austria	Institutional Revolutionary Party	2015–2018	63rd Congress
2018	Fortunato Rivera Castillo	National Regeneration Movement	2018–2021	64th Congress
2021	Sayonara Vargas Rodríguez	Institutional Revolutionary Party	2021–2024	65th Congress
2024	Daniel Andrade Zurutuza	National Regeneration Movement	2024–2027	66th Congress

== Presidential elections ==
Hidalgo's 1st district
Election	District won by	Party or coalition	%
2018	Andrés Manuel López Obrador	Juntos Haremos Historia	58.0444
2024	Claudia Sheinbaum Pardo	Sigamos Haciendo Historia	73.0370
