= Emilio Badillo Ramírez =

Mexican politician

- Born: 22 September 1950 (age 75); Huejutla de Reyes, Hidalgo, Mexico
- Occupation: Politician
- Political party: PRI

Emilio Badillo Ramírez (born 22 September 1950) is a Mexican politician affiliated with the Institutional Revolutionary Party (PRI). In 2003–2006 he served as a federal deputy in the 59th Congress, representing Hidalgo's first district.
