= Xochiatipan =

- Town and municipality
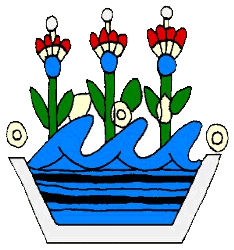
- Coat of arms

- Location within Hidalgo Location within Mexico
- Coordinates: 20°50′00″N 98°17′06″W
- Country: Mexico
- State: Hidalgo
- Municipality: Xochiatipan

Government
  - Federal electoral district: Hidalgo's 1st

Area
  - Total: 149 km^{2} (58 sq mi)

Population (2005)
  - Total: 18,157
- Time zone: UTC-6 (Zona Centro)
- Website: www.xochiatipan.gob.mx

Xochiatipan is a town and one of the 84 municipalities of Hidalgo, in central-eastern Mexico. The municipality covers an area of 149 km^{2} (58 sq mi).

As of 2005, the municipality had a total population of 18,157.
