= Orizatlán =

Town in the Mexican state of Hidalgo

San Felipe Orizatlán Orizatlán
- Town and municipality
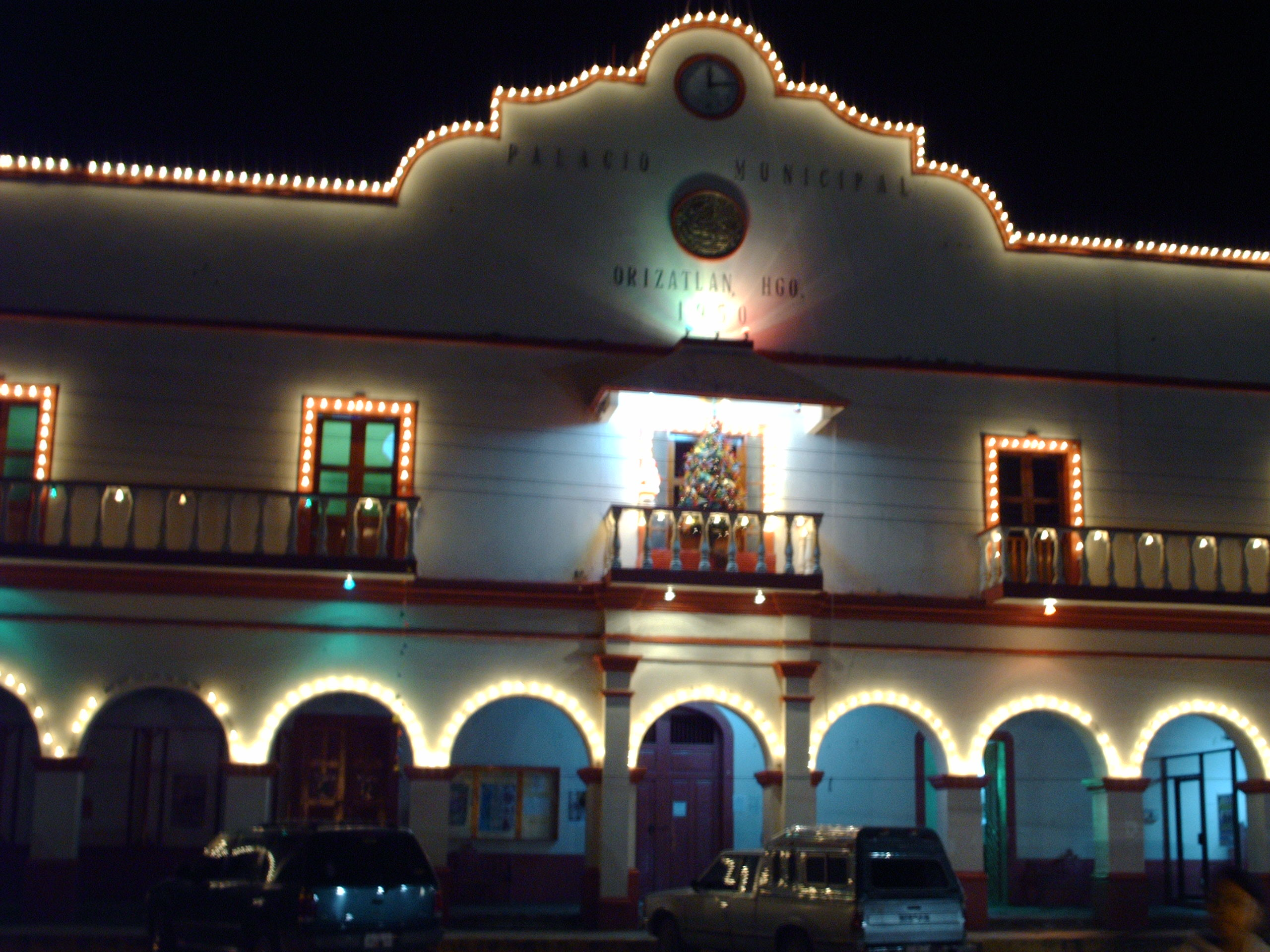
- Municipal palace

- Coat of arms

- Location within Hidalgo Location within Mexico
- Coordinates: 21°10′19″N 98°36′23″W
- Country: Mexico
- State: Hidalgo
- Municipality: Orizatlán

Government
  - Federal electoral district: Hidalgo's 1st

Area
  - Total: 323.59 km^{2} (124.94 sq mi)

Population (2020)
  - Total: 38,492
  - Density: 45.86/km^{2} (118.77/sq mi)
- Time zone: UTC-6 (Zona Centro)
- Postal code: 43020
- Area code: 483
- Website: orizatlan.gob.mx

Orizatlán (officially: San Felipe Orizatlán) is a town in the north of the Mexican state of Hidalgo. It serves as the municipal seat for the surrounding municipality of the same name.

The municipality covers an area of 323.59 km^{2} (124.94 sq mi) and, in the 2020 census, reported a population of 38,492, up from 38,472 in 2005. It is located on Hidalgo's borders with Veracruz and San Luis Potosí.

== Toponymy ==
Its name is due in its first part to the patron saint San Felipe de Jesús and in the second part to the Greek root oryza (rice) and the Nahuatl tlan (place), so it is understood that it means "place of rice". (Note: The etymological origin of the name of a municipality can have different interpretations or have an uncertain origin, this is the most common or most accepted by the municipal government and its residents, according to the Encyclopedia of the Municipalities of Mexico.)

== History ==
The first inhabitants of the area were Huasco indigenous people who settled in the area before the conquest. Originally, San Felipe Orizatlán was Indian political society belonging to the jurisdiction of Huejutla. The municipal seat was founded in the 16th century by indigenous people and Spaniards, thus carrying out an evangelization. In 1870, the state of Hidalgo declared Orizatlán a municipal seat.
