= Efrén Rebolledo =

Mexican poet and diplomat (1877–1929)

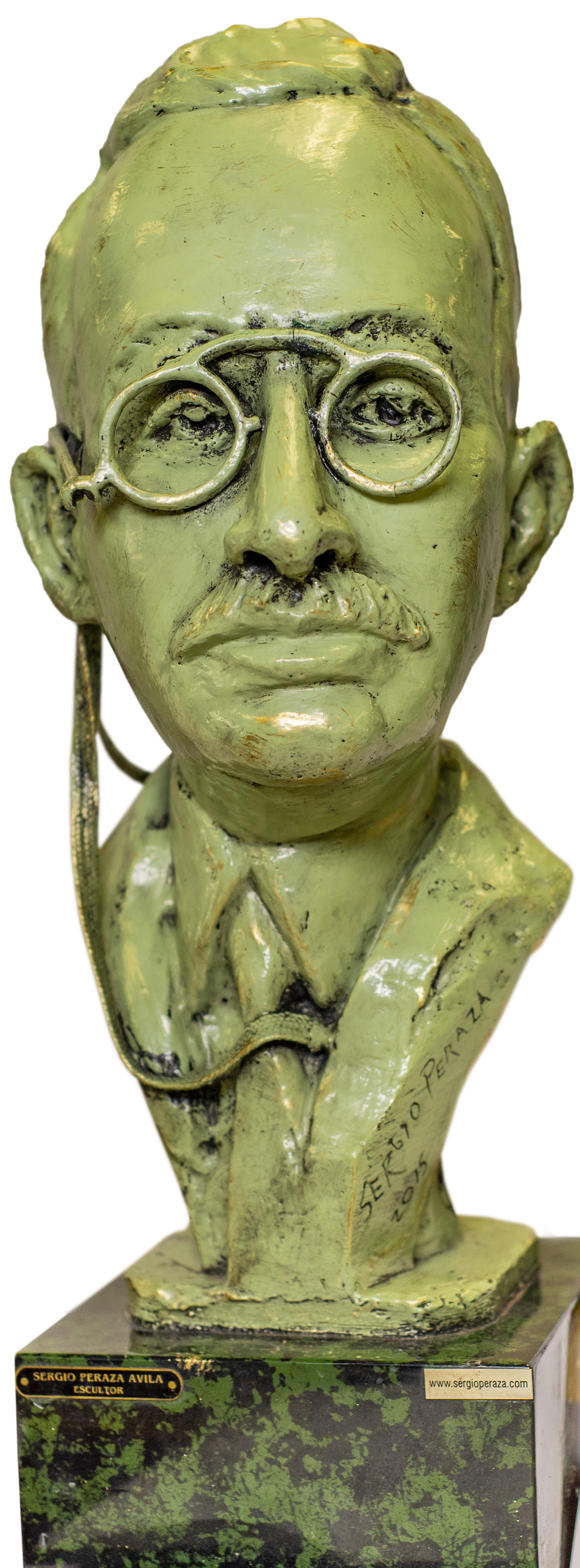

Efrén Rebolledo, born Santiago Procopio Rebolledo, (Actopan, Hidalgo, Mexico, 9 July 1877 – Madrid, Spain, 10 December 1929) was a Mexican orientalist, modernist poet, diplomat, and lawyer. His poetry had parnassianist influences, such as in Cuarzos. It also touched erotic themes such as lesbianism in Victrix Caro and El beso de Safo; similar to José Juan Tablada, Rebolledo was ostracized by his contemporaries for this.

== Biography ==
On 9 July 1877, Rebolledo was born in Actopan, Hidalgo, Mexico, to Petronilo Flores, who abandoned the family, and Otomi Petra Rebolledo; he also had a brother named Francisco. He was baptized at San Nicolás Tolentino parish as Santiago Procopio but took the name of Ephrem the Syrian and did not take his father's surname. During his youth, his family faced poverty and also grew up in Pachuca. He received a scholarship to secondary and college-preparatory school, attending the Scientific and Literary Institute at the Universidad Autónoma del Estado de Hidalgo; he then attended the Faculty of Law and graduated with a law degree. He received attention on 17 June 1899 for an ode to Emilio Castelar, leading to his professional beginnings in poetry in 1900, collaborating with the Revista Moderna, whose director and founder, Jesús E. Valenzuela, encouraged his pursuit. He also collaborated with Revista de Revistas, El Mundo Ilustrado, and Vida Moderna, among others. Álvaro Matute Aguirre compared Rebolledo's values to the Mexican Youth Athenaeum based on his strong inclination to literature and his works published in Vida Moderna.

In 1901, he joined the diplomatic corps, possibly as suggested by Bernardo Reyes, under the protection of Ignacio Mariscal. He represented Mexico in Cuba, Chile, Guatemala, the French Third Republic, the Kingdom of the Netherlands, Great Qing, and the Empire of Japan. His near decade-long stay in Japan had a lasting effect on his work, writing a novel of his experience in Nikkō and translating a local saying to Spanish that reads: "Who has never seen Nikko, cannot say magnificent." He composed Rimas japonesas while in Tokyo, writing of its nights while thinking of prostitutes:

In tempestuous bursts of wild fury;
the uproar reaches my excited ear
and the fine painted mouths of vice
are brimming with the venom of lust.

Before ambassador Luis G. Pardo's departure for Europe, he designated Rebolledo as chargé d'affaires. He himself left in June 1915 funded by a loan from Mitsui & Co.

Between 1911 and 1919, in addition to his own works he translated those by Rudyard Kipling, Oscar Wilde, and Maurice Maeterlinck. In 1912, he founded Nosotros magazine with Gregorio López y Fuentes, Francisco González Guerrero, and Rodrigo Torres Hernández; with Enrique González Martínez and Ramón López Velarde, he founded the Revista Pegaso in 1917. Between 1918 and 1922, he served as deputy for Hidalgo's first district to the Congress of the Union. In his campaign he made home visits and held literary gatherings where he gave out his books. During his tenure, he fought for the rights of the Mezquital Valley peasants, however was comfortable under the regimes of Porfirio Díaz and Victoriano Huerta.

He served as first secretary in Oslo, Norway, from August 1919 to 1922. His 1922 works were published by Peter Tidemand Malling's Det Mallingske Bogtrykkeri. In 1919, he met 19-year-old Thorborg Blomkvist, whom he married in spring 1921. They had three children: Thor Rebolledo Blomkvist (December 1921), Efrén Rebolledo Blomkvist (1924–2006), and Gloria Rebolledo Blomkvist. Between July and December 1921, he worked on Saga de Sigrida la Blonda; he gave a personal copy to his son Efrén, who gifted it to friend and co-worker at the University of Oslo Professor Juan López Pellicer. After his tenure he moved to Madrid, Spain.

On 10 or 11 December 1929, he died in Madrid due to complications with face paralysis first suffered in 1910. Javier Sánchez Mejorada requested his remains be returned to Mexico and his family receive a lifetime pension; neither were granted. Rebolledo was buried in the Cementerio de la Almudena on 15 July 1940 and no pension was awarded to Blomkvist-Rebolledo. He is commemorated in the name of the Foro Cultural Efrén Rebolledo in Pachuca. One of his descendants is his Norwegian grandson, Torgeir Rebolledo Pedersen.

== Works ==
- El enemigo (novel, 1900)
- Cuarzos (poems, 1902)
- Más allá de las nubes (poems, 1903)
- Hilos de corales, (poems, 1904)
- Estela (poems and prose poems, 1907)
- Joyeles (anthology, 1907)
- Rimas japonesas (poems, 1907, edited in 1915)
- Nikko (travelogue, 1910)
- Hojas de bambú (novel, 1910)
- El desencanto de Dulcinea (prose poems, 1916)
- Caro victrix (poems, 1916)
- Libro de loco amor (1916)
- El águila que cae (tragedy, 1916)
- Salamandra, novela de Efrén Rebolledo (1919, edited in Norway in 1922)
- Joyelero (collection of poems, 1922)
- Saga de Sigrida la Blonda (novel, 1922)

== Bibliography ==
- Aguilar Dornelles, Maria Alejandra (2011). "La Poesía Erótica de Mercedes Matamoros en la Genealogía del Modernismo Latinoamericano". Latin American Literary Review. 39 (78): 36–60. ISSN 0047-4134. JSTOR 41478092.
- Feria, Miguel Ángel (2016). "El Canon Parnasiano de la Poesía Modernista Mexicana". Nueva Revista de Filología Hispánica. 64 (2): 457–493. doi:10.24201/nrfh.v64i2.2573. ISSN 0185-0121. JSTOR 44114772.
- Lorenzo-Monterrubio, Carmen; Vergara-Hernández, Arturo; Pacheco-Medina, María Esther (2020). "Efrén Rebolledo y las fronteras literarias". MAGOTZI Boletín Científico de Artes del IA. 8: 34–40. doi:10.29057/ia.v8i16.5509. S2CID 225538504.
- Monsiváis, Carlos (1997). ""Los que tenemos unas manos que no nos pertenecen" (A propósito de lo "Queer" y lo "Rarito")". Debate Feminista. 16: 11–33. doi:10.22201/cieg.2594066xe.1997.16.401 (inactive 12 July 2025). ISSN 0188-9478. JSTOR 42624435.
- Quintana Pareja, Emilio (7 February 2020). "Noruega como espacio periférico en la depuración del Modernismo hispánico. El caso de Efrén Rebolledo y su libro Saga de Sigrida la Blonda (1922)". Nordic Journal of Modern Language Methodology. 7 (2). doi:10.46364/njmlm.v7i2.667. ISSN 1894-2245. S2CID 216727994.
- Rosenzweig, Gabriel (2012). "Los Diplomáticos Mexicanos Durante la Revolución: Entre el Desempleo y el Exilio". Historia Mexicana. 61 (4 (244)): 1461–1523. ISSN 0185-0172. JSTOR 41472678.
- Tenorio-Trillo, Mauricio (2012). I speak of the city : Mexico City at the turn of the twentieth century. Chicago: University of Chicago Press. ISBN 9780226792736.
