= Juan Alonso Hernández Hernández =

Mexican politician (born 1960)

- Born: 15 November 1960 (age 65); Hidalgo, Mexico
- Occupation: Politician
- Political party: PRI

Juan Alonso Hernández Hernández (born 15 November 1960) is a Mexican politician from the Institutional Revolutionary Party (PRI). From 2002 to 2003 he served in the Chamber of Deputies during the 58th Congress, representing Hidalgo's 1st district as the alternate of Carolina Viggiano Austria.
