= Tianguistengo =

- Town and municipality
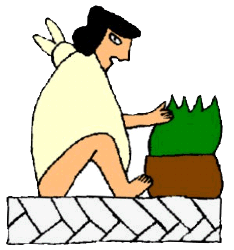
- Coat of arms

- Location in Mexico Tianguistengo (Mexico)
- Coordinates: 20°43′40″N 98°37′44″W
- Country: Mexico
- State: Hidalgo
- Municipality: Tianguistengo

Government
  - Federal electoral district: Hidalgo's 1st

Area
  - Total: 134 km^{2} (52 sq mi)

Population (2020)
  - Total: 14,340
- Time zone: UTC-6 (Zona Centro)
- Website: tianguistengo.gob.mx

Tianguistengo is a town and one of the 84 municipalities of Hidalgo, in central-eastern Mexico. The municipality covers an area of 134 km^{2} (52 sq mi).

As of 2020, the municipality had a total population of 14,340.
