= Eloxochitlán, Hidalgo =

Eloxochitlán
- Village and municipality
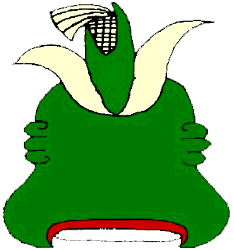
- Coat of arms

- Location within Hidalgo Location within Mexico
- Coordinates: 20°44′43″N 98°48′36″W
- Country: Mexico
- State: Hidalgo
- Municipality: Eloxochitlán

Government
  - Federal electoral district: Hidalgo's 1st

Area
  - Total: 200.4 km^{2} (77.4 sq mi)

Population (2005)
  - Total: 2,417
- Time zone: UTC-6 (Central)
- Website: ayuntamientoeloxochitlanhgo.gob.mx

Eloxochitlán is a village and one of the 84 municipalities of Hidalgo, in central-eastern Mexico. The municipality covers an area of 200.4 km^{2} (77.4 sq mi).

In 2005, the municipality had a total population of 2,417.

The name contains the Nahuatl elements elotl (maize), xochitl (flower) and tlan (place).
