= Huautla, Hidalgo =

Huautla
- Town and municipality
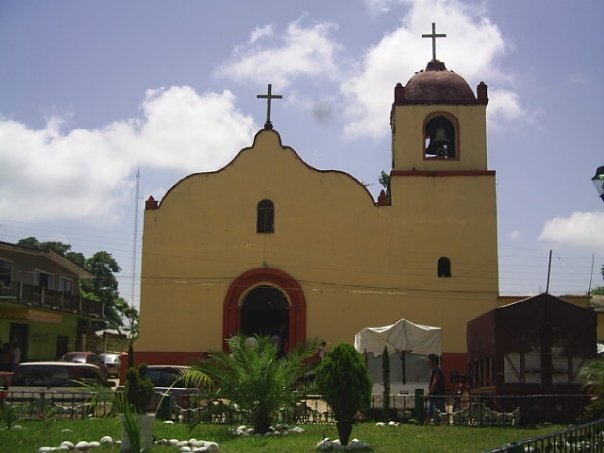
- Parish church of St. John, Huautla

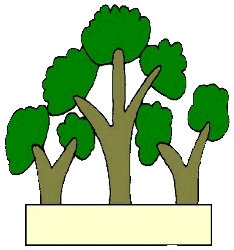
- Coat of arms

- Location within Hidalgo Location within Mexico
- Coordinates: 21°01′51″N 98°17′06″W
- Country: Mexico
- State: Hidalgo
- Municipality: Huautla

Government
  - Federal electoral district: Hidalgo's 1st

Area
  - Total: 287.8 km^{2} (111.1 sq mi)

Population (2005)
  - Total: 22,521
- Time zone: UTC-6 (Zona Centro)

Huautla is a town and one of the 84 municipalities of Hidalgo, in central-eastern Mexico. The municipality covers an area of 287.8 km^{2} (111.1 sq mi).

As of 2005, the municipality had a total population of 22,521.
