= Tepehuacán de Guerrero =

- Town and municipality
- Location within Hidalgo Location within Mexico
- Coordinates: 21°0′47″N 98°50′39″W
- Country: Mexico
- State: Hidalgo
- Municipality: Tepehuacán de Guerrero

Government
  - Federal electoral district: Hidalgo's 1st

Area
  - Total: 426.6 km^{2} (164.7 sq mi)

Population (2005)
  - Total: 27,240
- Time zone: UTC-6 (Central)

Tepehuacán de Guerrero is a town and one of the 84 municipalities of Hidalgo, in central-eastern Mexico. The municipality covers an area of 426.6 km^{2}.

In 2005, the municipality had a total population of 27,240.
