= Xochicoatlán =

- Town and municipality
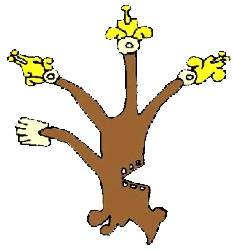
- Coat of arms

- Location of the municipality of Xochicoatlán in the state of Hidalgo.

- Location within Mexico
- Coordinates: 20°46′36″N 98°40′48″W
- Country: Mexico
- State: Hidalgo
- Municipality: Xochicoatlán

Government Labor Party
  - Mayor: Elda Ramírez Maya (2020-2024)
  - Federal electoral district: Hidalgo's 1st

Area
  - Total: 159.3 km^{2} (61.5 sq mi)

Population (2020)
  - Total: 7,015
  - Density: 397/km^{2} (1,030/sq mi)
- Time zone: UTC-6 (Zona Centro)
- Postal code: 43250
- Area code: 774
- Website: www.xochicoatlan.gob.mx

Xochicoatlán is a town and one of the 84 municipalities of Hidalgo, in central-eastern Mexico. The municipality covers an area of 159.3 km^{2} (61.5 sq mi).

As of 2020, the municipality had a total population of 7,015.

== Toponymy ==
The word Xochicoatlán comes from the Nahuatl Xóchitl 'flower' and cuauhtl 'tree'; so its meaning is "Place of the viper flower". (Note: The etymological origin of the name of a municipality can have different interpretations or have an uncertain origin, this is the most common or most accepted by the government municipality and its residents, according to the Encyclopedia of the Municipalities of Mexico.)

== Geography ==
=== Terrain and hydrology ===
Xochicoatlánis located within the province of Sierra Madre Oriental, within the Carso Huasteco subprovince. Its terrain is mountainous or hilly uplands (70.0%) and plateaux (30.0%).

Its geology corresponds to the Jurassic period (46.3%), Permian (16), Triassic (13.0%), Cretaceous (12.0%) and neogene (12.0%). With extrusive igneous type rocks: acid tuff (7.0%) and basalt (4.3%) Sedimentary: shale-sandstone (38.0%), limestone-shale ( 26.0%), sandstone-conglomerate (13.0%) and limestone (11.0%). Regarding pedology the dominant soil is leptosol (35.0%), luvisol (23.3%), umbrisol (30.5%), cambisol (7.5%) and regosol (3.0%).

Regarding hydrology it is positioned in the hydrological region of the Pánuco (3.0%); in the basins of the Moctezuma River; within the subbasin of the Los Hules River.

=== Climate ===
The municipality presents a variety of climates: Humid temperate with rain all year round (59.0%); humid temperate with abundant rains in summer (22.0%); humid semi-warm with rain all year round (16.0%); and temperate subhumid with rains in summer, with higher humidity (3.0%).It registers an average annual temperature of 19 °C and a rainfall of 1,890 millimeters per year, the rainy period is from June to December .

=== Ecology ===
In flora it has vegetation made up of broadleaf forest and medium-sized subevergreen forest. As for fauna there are wild boar, porcupine, hare duck, falcon and eagle.

== Politics ==
It was erected as a municipality on February 15, 1826. The Honorable City Council is composed of: a Municipal President, a Syndic, eight Councilors, and 34 Municipal Delegates. According to the National Electoral Institute (INE) the municipality is made up of 9 electoral sections, from 1576 to 1584. For the election of federal deputies to the Chamber of Deputies of Mexico and local deputies to the Congress of Hidalgo, it is integrated into the I Federal Electoral District of Hidalgo and the II Local Electoral District of Hidalgo. A state administrative level belongs to Macroregion IV and Microregion III, as well as to Operational Region XII Molango.

=== Chronology of municipal presidents ===
Period	Name	Political affiliation
1961-1964	Santiago Beltrán Pérez	-
1964-1967	Manuel Juarez Hernandez	-
1967-1970	Javier Camargo Lara	-
1970-1973	José Villegas de Ita	-
1973-1976	Jesus L. Bustos Perez	-
1976-1979	Edmundo López Lara	-
1979-1982	Liborio Perez Perez	-
1982-1985	Crisógono Ramírez Cerecedo	-
1985-1988	José E. Cuevas de Ita	-
1988-1991	Tomás Soní Juárez	-
1991-1994	Ricardo Juárez Salas	-
16/01/1994 to 15/01/1997	Tomas Juárez Cisneros	PRI
16/01/1997 to 15/01/2000	Reynaldo Pérez Soní	PRI
16/01/2000 to 15/01/2003	Angel Baltazar Perez	PRI
16/01/2003 to 15/01/2006	Moises Perez Sierra	PRI
16/01/2006 to 15/01/2009	Baltazar Torres Villegas	PVEM
16/01/2009 to 15/01/2012	Angel Baltazar Perez Perez	PRI
16/01/2012 to 01/05/2012	David Cuevas Covarrubias	Interim City; Council
02/05/2012 to 04/09/2016	Baltazar Soní Guillermo	PT
05/09/2016 to 04/09/2020	Nabor Perez Juarez	PT
05/09/2020 to 14/12/2020	Guillermo Vite Refugio	Interim City; Council (Note: Due to the postponement of the 2020 Hidalgo State Election, due to the COVID-19 pandemic; Interim Municipal Councils are appointed.)
15/12/2020 to 04/09/2024	Elda Ramírez Maya	PT

== Economy ==
In 2015 the municipality had an HDI of 0.684 Medium, so ranks 53rd at the state level; and in 2005 it presented a GDP of $315,651,036.00 Mexican pesos, and a GDP per capita of $45,391.00 (current prices of 2005). According to the National Council for the Evaluation of Social Development Policy (Coneval), the municipality registers a Marginalization Index Medium. 39.4% of the population is in moderate poverty and 37.7% is in extreme poverty. In 2015, the municipality ranked 58th out of 84 municipalities in the state scale of social backwardness.

As of 2015, in terms of agriculture, corn, beans, coffee, oranges and piloncillo cane are grown. In livestock cattle are raised for milk and meat, sheep, pigs and goats, laying and fattening birds, as well as turkeys, also producing honey and beeswax.

In 2015, there were 49 economic units, which generated jobs for 98 people. As far as commerce is concerned, there is one tianguis, nine Diconsa stores and two Liconsa dairy shops. According to figures for the year 2015 presented in the Economic Censuses by INEGI, the Economically Active Population (EAP) of the municipality amounts to 2094 people, of which 1977 are employed and 117 are unemployed. (Note: Size of the community according to the number of inhabitants for the population aged 12 and over.) 42.19% belong to the primary sector, 22.71% belong to the secondary sector, 34.45% belong to the tertiary sector and 0.65% did not specify.
