= Lolotla =

- Town and municipality
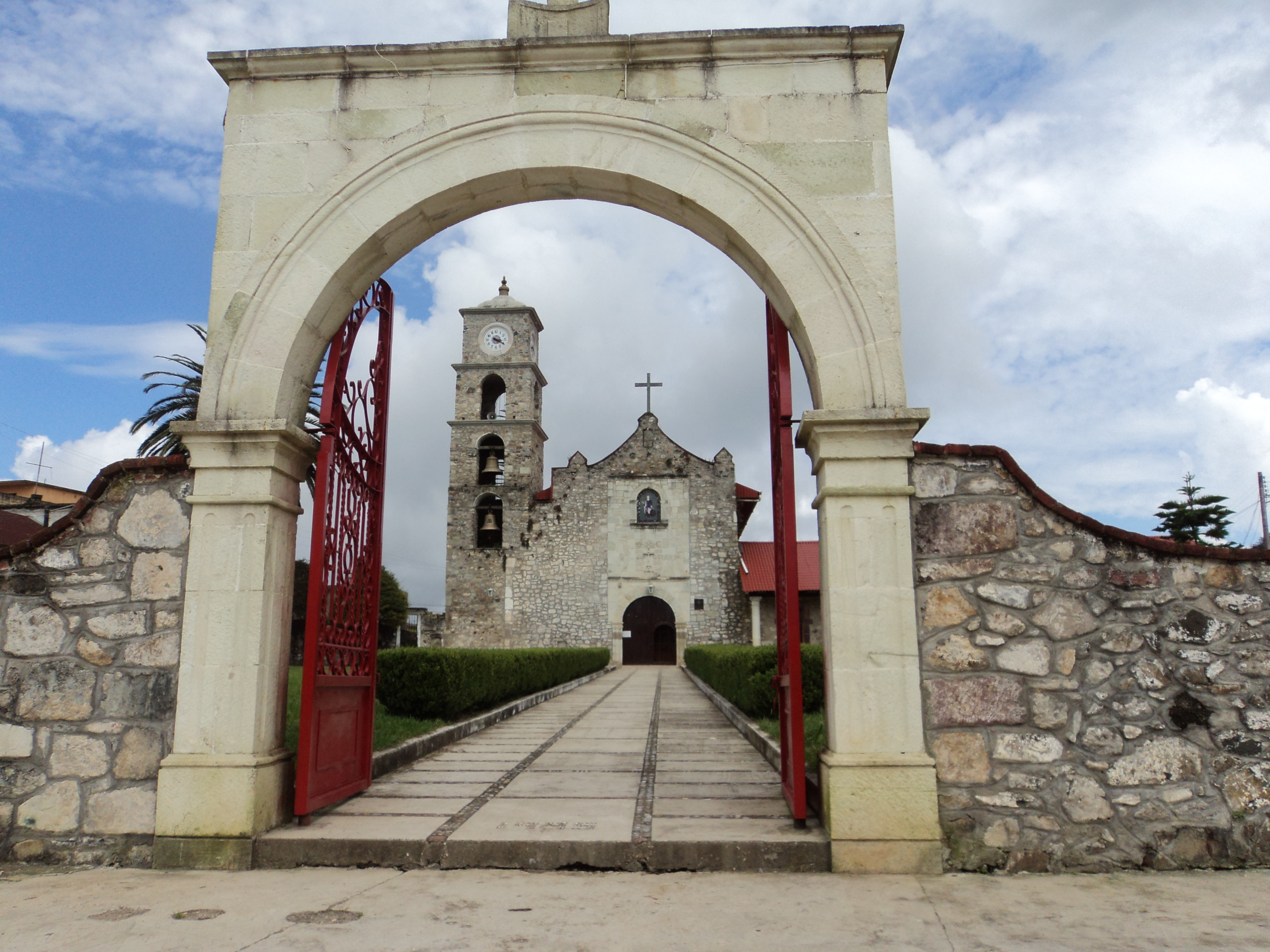
- Church of St Catherine, Lolotla

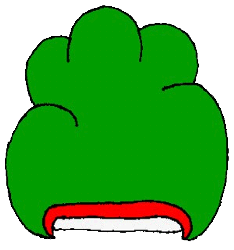
- Coat of arms

- Location within Hidalgo Location within Mexico
- Coordinates: 20°50′21″N 98°43′4″W
- Country: Mexico
- State: Hidalgo
- Municipality: Lolotla

Government
  - Federal electoral district: Hidalgo's 1st

Area
  - Total: 215.9 km^{2} (83.4 sq mi)

Population (2005)
  - Total: 9,541
- Time zone: UTC-6 (Zona Centro)
- Website: lolotla.gob.mx

Lolotla is a town and one of the 84 municipalities of Hidalgo, in central-eastern Mexico. The municipality covers an area of 215.9 km^{2} (83.4 sq mi).

As of 2005, the municipality had a total population of 9541.
