= Darío Badillo Ramírez =

Mexican politician (born 1959)

- Born: 10 December 1959 (age 66); Huejutla de los Reyes, Hidalgo, Mexico
- Occupation: Deputy
- Political party: PRI

Darío Badillo Ramírez (born 10 December 1959) is a Mexican politician affiliated with the Institutional Revolutionary Party (PRI). In 2012–2015 he served as a federal deputy in the 62nd Congress, representing Hidalgo's first district.
