= Atlapexco =

- Town and municipality
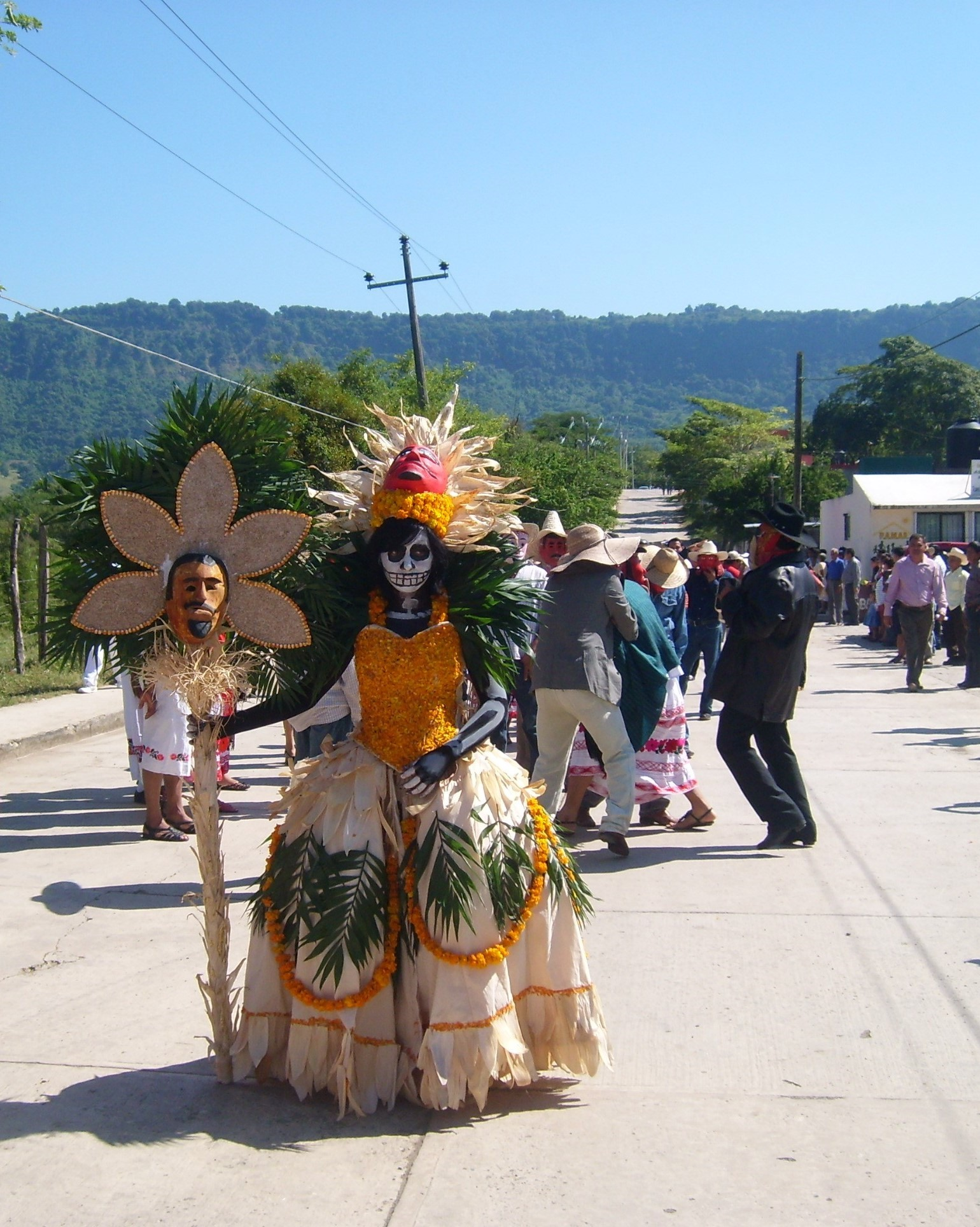
- Xantolo festival in Atlapexco

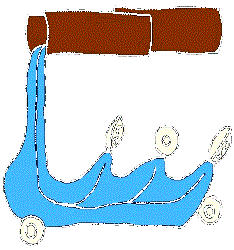
- Coat of arms

- Location within Hidalgo Location within Mexico
- Coordinates: 21°0′15″N 98°30′20″W
- Country: Mexico
- State: Hidalgo
- Municipality: Atlapexco

Government
  - Federal electoral district: Hidalgo's 1st

Area
  - Total: 84.8 km^{2} (32.7 sq mi)

Population (2020)
  - Total: 19,812
- Time zone: UTC-6 (Zona Centro)

Atlapexco is a town and one of the 84 municipalities of Hidalgo, in central-eastern Mexico. The municipality covers an area of 84.8 km^{2}.

As of 2005, the municipality had a total population of 18,769.
