= Jaltocán =

- Town and municipality
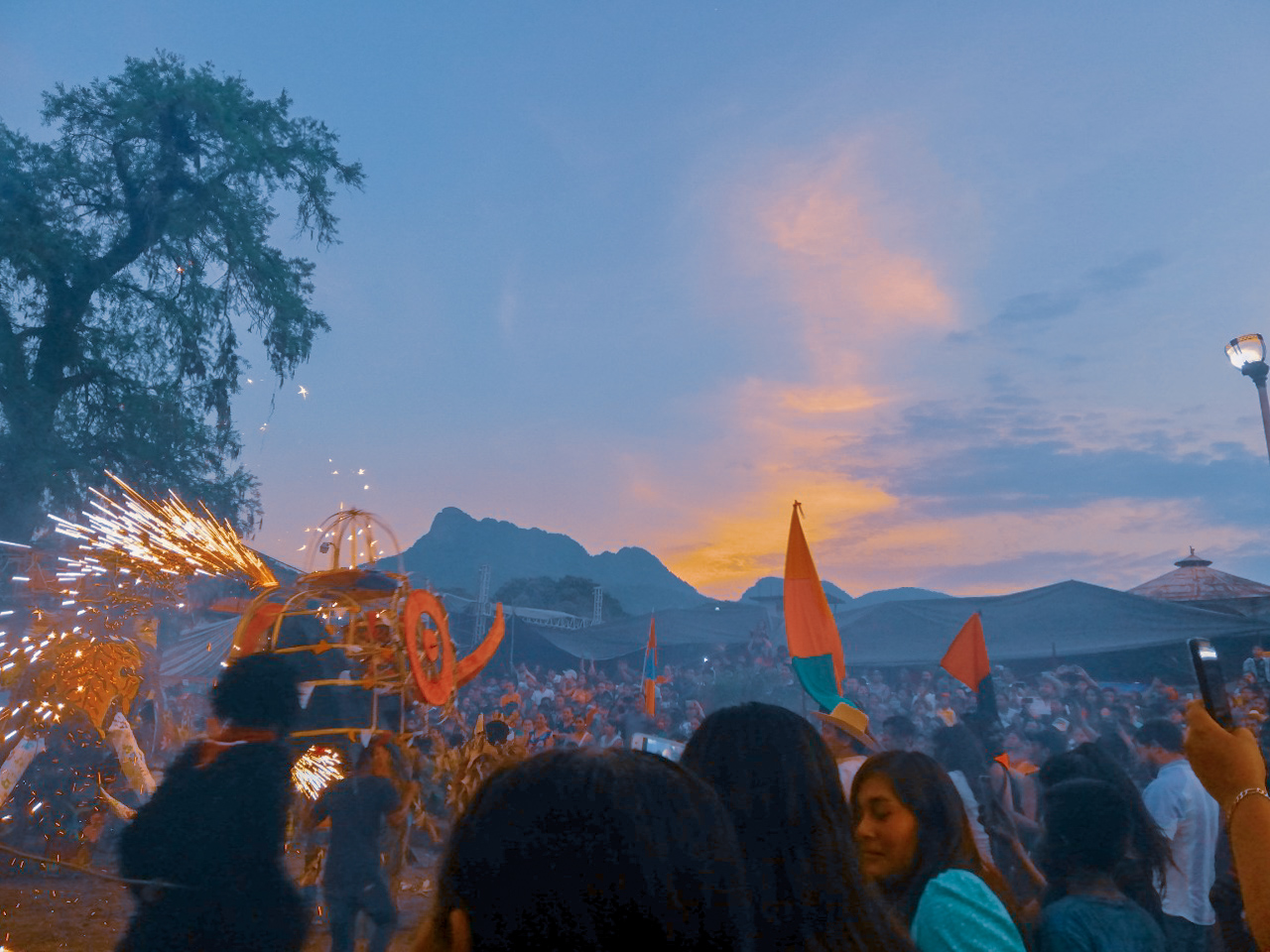
- Carnival in Jaltocán, 2019

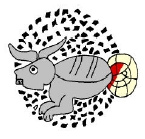
- Coat of arms

- Location within Hidalgo Location within Mexico
- Coordinates: 21°08′00″N 98°32′18″W
- Country: Mexico
- State: Hidalgo
- Municipality: Jaltocan

Government
  - Federal electoral district: Hidalgo's 1st

Area
  - Total: 48.8 km^{2} (18.8 sq mi)

Population (2005)
  - Total: 10,265
- Time zone: UTC-6 (Zona Centro)
- Website: jaltocan.gob.mx

Jaltocán is a town and one of the 84 municipalities of Hidalgo, in central-eastern Mexico. The municipality covers an area of 48.8 km^{2}. The origin of its name comes from the word Xaltocan, of origin Nahuatl, which translates to "Place where it is sown in sand"

As of 2005, the municipality had a total population of 10,265. In 2017 there were 9,468 inhabitants who spoke an indigenous language, primarily Huasteca Nahuatl.
