= Huazalingo =

- Town and municipality
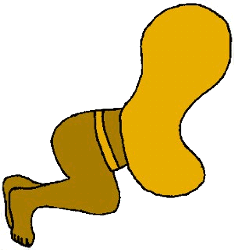
- Coat of arms

- Location within Hidalgo Location within Mexico
- Coordinates: 20.981°N 98.507°W
- Country: Mexico
- State: Hidalgo
- Municipality: Huazalingo

Government
  - Federal electoral district: Hidalgo's 1st

Area
  - Total: 113.1 km^{2} (43.7 sq mi)

Population (2020)
  - Total: 12,766
- Time zone: UTC-6 (Zona Centro)

Huazalingo is a town and one of the 84 municipalities of Hidalgo, in central-eastern Mexico. The municipality covers an area of 113.1 km^{2} (43.7 sq mi).

As of 2020, the municipality had a total population of 12,766.
