= Joel Guerrero Juárez =

Mexican politician

- Born: 3 December 1950 (age 75); Pachuca, Hidalgo, Mexico
- Occupation: Politician
- Political party: PRI

Joel Guerrero Juárez (born 3 December 1950) is a Mexican politician affiliated with the Institutional Revolutionary Party (PRI).

Guerrero Juárez has served in the Chamber of Deputies on three occasions: during the 55th Congress (1991–1994), for Hidalgo's fourth district; during the 57th Congress (1997–1999), for Hidalgo's seventh district; and during the 60th Congress (2006–2009), for Hidalgo's first district.
