= Tlanchinol =

- Town and municipality
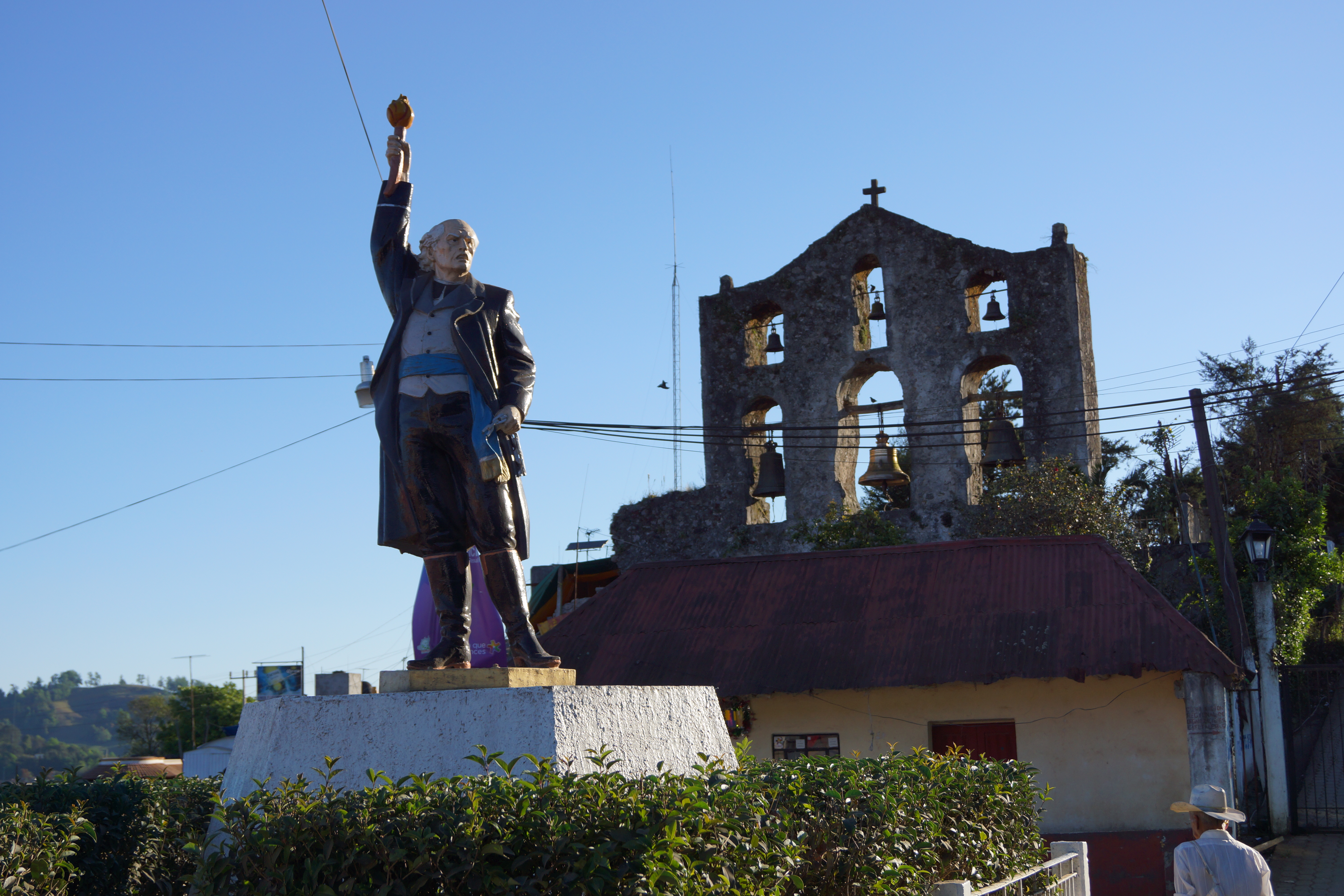
- Statue of Miguel Hidalgo in Tlanchinol

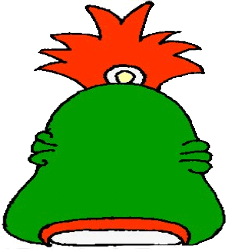
- Coat of arms

- Location in Mexico Tlanchinol (Mexico)
- Coordinates: 20.989°N 98.662°W
- Country: Mexico
- State: Hidalgo
- Municipality: Tlanchinol
- Granted municipal status: 1869

Government
  - Federal electoral district: Hidalgo's 1st

Area
  - Total: 380.3 km^{2} (146.8 sq mi)

Population (2020)
  - Total: 37,722
- (municipality)
- Time zone: UTC-6 (Zona Centro)
- Website: tlanchinol.gob.mx

Tlanchinol is a town and one of the 84 municipalities of Hidalgo, in central-eastern Mexico. The municipality covers an area of 380.3 square kilometres (146.8 sq mi). The town stands on Federal Highway 105 in the mountains of the Sierra Madre Oriental.

The name comes from the Nahuatl Tlanchinolli ("burnt house") and icpac (locative of superposition); hence: "on the burnt house". An earlier form of the name was Tlanchinaltic.

The municipality was created in 1869. In the 2020 INEGI census, it reported a total population of 37,722, up from 33,694 in 2005.
