= Molango =

- Town and municipality
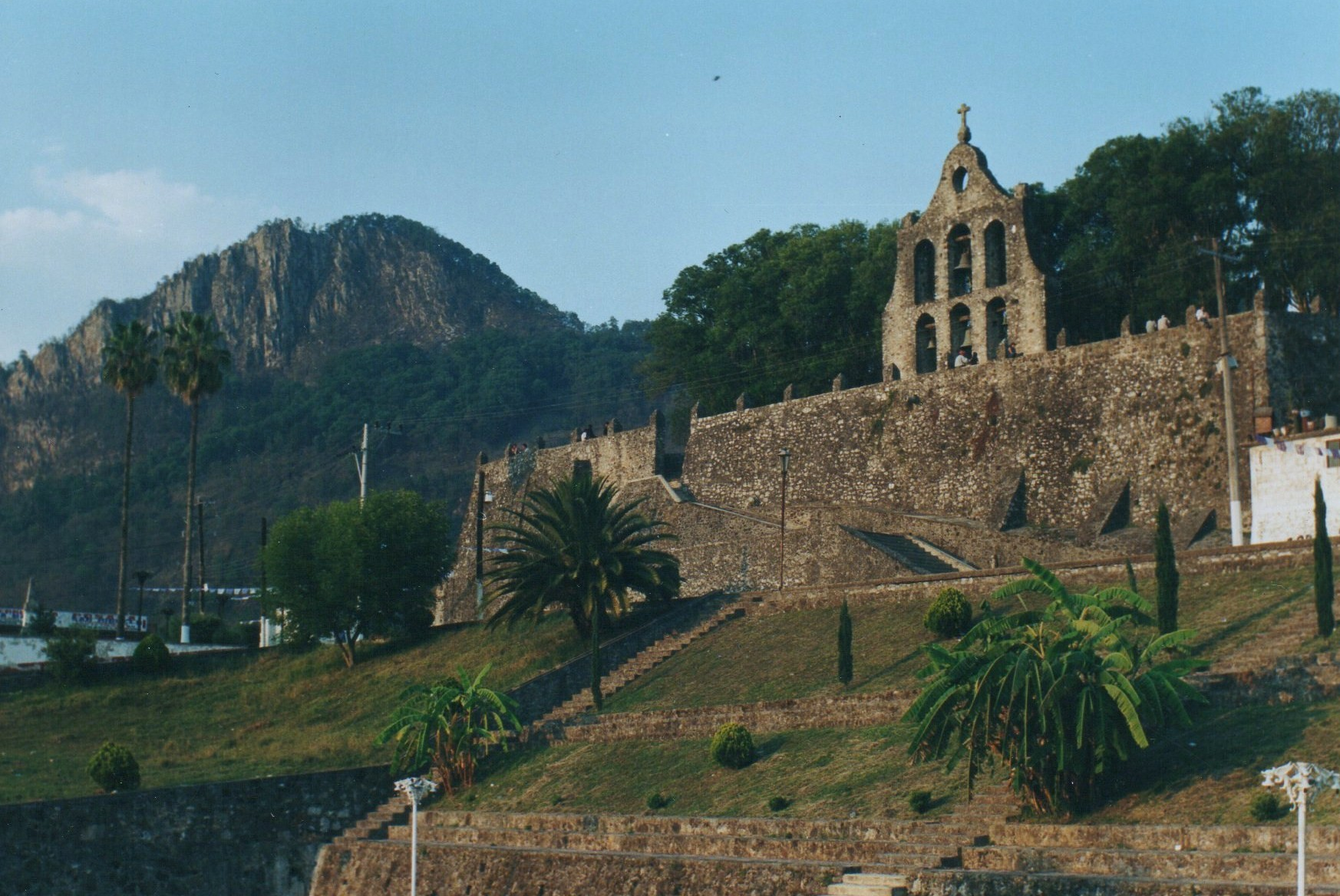

- Coat of arms

- Location within Hidalgo Location within Mexico
- Coordinates: 20°47′04″N 98°43′03″W
- Country: Mexico
- State: Hidalgo
- Municipality: Molango

Government
  - Federal electoral district: Hidalgo's 1st

Area
  - Total: 246.7 km^{2} (95.3 sq mi)

Population (2005)
  - Total: 10,385
- Time zone: UTC-6 (Zona Centro)
- Website: molango.hidalgo.gob.mx

Molango (officially Molango de Escamilla) is a town and one of the 84 municipalities of Hidalgo, in central-eastern Mexico. The municipality covers an area of 246.7 km^{2} (95.3 sq mi).

As of 2005, the municipality had a total population of 10,385.

Molango comes from the Word Molanco a nahuatl name that means place of the god mola a pre-Columbian deity that represents the surrounding mountains and was worshipped within the territory by Nahua and Otomi People's Who still live within this municipality to this day. The three languages spoken within molango are Spanish Nahuatl De La Huasteca Hidalguense and Otomí-Tepehua. The current mayor is Raul Lozano Cano.
