= Juárez Hidalgo =

- Town and municipality
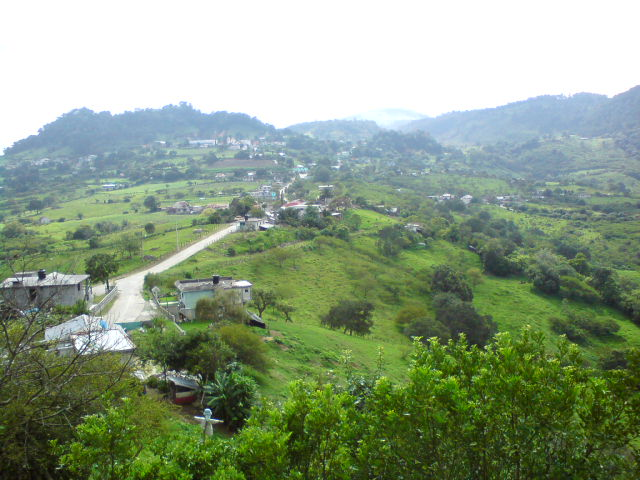
- View over Juárez Hidalgo

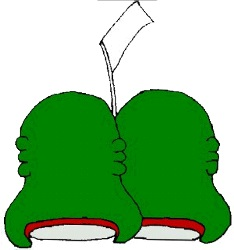
- Coat of arms

- Location within Hidalgo Location within Mexico
- Coordinates: 20°46′59″N 98°49′44″W
- Country: Mexico
- State: Hidalgo
- Municipality: Juárez Hidalgo
- Municipality created: 1869

Government
  - Federal electoral district: Hidalgo's 1st

Area
  - Total: 161.9 km^{2} (62.5 sq mi)

Population (2005)
  - Total: 1,820
- Time zone: UTC-6 (Central)
- Website: www.juarez-hidalgo.gob.mx

Juárez Hidalgo is a town and one of the 84 municipalities of Hidalgo, in central-eastern Mexico. Created in 1869, its name honours both Benito Juárez and Miguel Hidalgo. The present-day municipal seat was known as Itztapanitla prior to European contact and, in colonial times, as San Guillermo.

The municipality of Juárez Hidalgo covers an area of 161.9 km^{2} (62.5 sq mi). In 2020, it had a total population of 2,895, down from the 2010 figure but up from the 1,820 reported in the 2005 census. Fewer than 1.5% of the population are indigenous language speakers, with Nahuatl the most common.
