= Municipalities of Hidalgo =

List of municipalities of Mexican state

Map of Mexico with Hidalgo highlighted

Hidalgo is a state in central Mexico divided into 84 municipalities. According to the 2020 INEGI census, Hidalgo is the 16th most populous state with 3,082,841 inhabitants and the 26th largest by land area spanning 20,813 square kilometres (8,036 sq mi).

Municipalities in Hidalgo are administratively autonomous of the state according to the 115th article of the 1917 Constitution of Mexico. Every three years, citizens elect a municipal president (Spanish: presidente municipal) by a plurality voting system who heads a concurrently elected municipal council (ayuntamiento) responsible for providing all the public services for their constituents. The municipal council consists of a variable number of trustees and councillors (regidores y síndicos). Municipalities are responsible for public services (such as water and sewerage), street lighting, public safety, traffic, and the maintenance of public parks, gardens and cemeteries. They may also assist the state and federal governments in education, emergency fire and medical services, environmental protection and maintenance of monuments and historical landmarks. Since 1984, they have had the power to collect property taxes and user fees, although more funds are obtained from the state and federal governments than from their own income.

The largest municipality by population in Hidalgo is Pachuca, with 314,331 residents, and the smallest is Eloxochitlán with 2,593 residents. The largest municipality by area in Hidalgo is Zimapán, which spans 824.20 km^{2} (318.23 sq mi), while Tlahuelilpan is the smallest at 28.20 km^{2} (10.89 sq mi). The first municipality to incorporate was Huichapan on March 11, 1824, and the newest municipality is Progreso de Obregón which incorporated January 8, 1970.

== Municipalities ==
Largest municipalities in Hidalgo by population

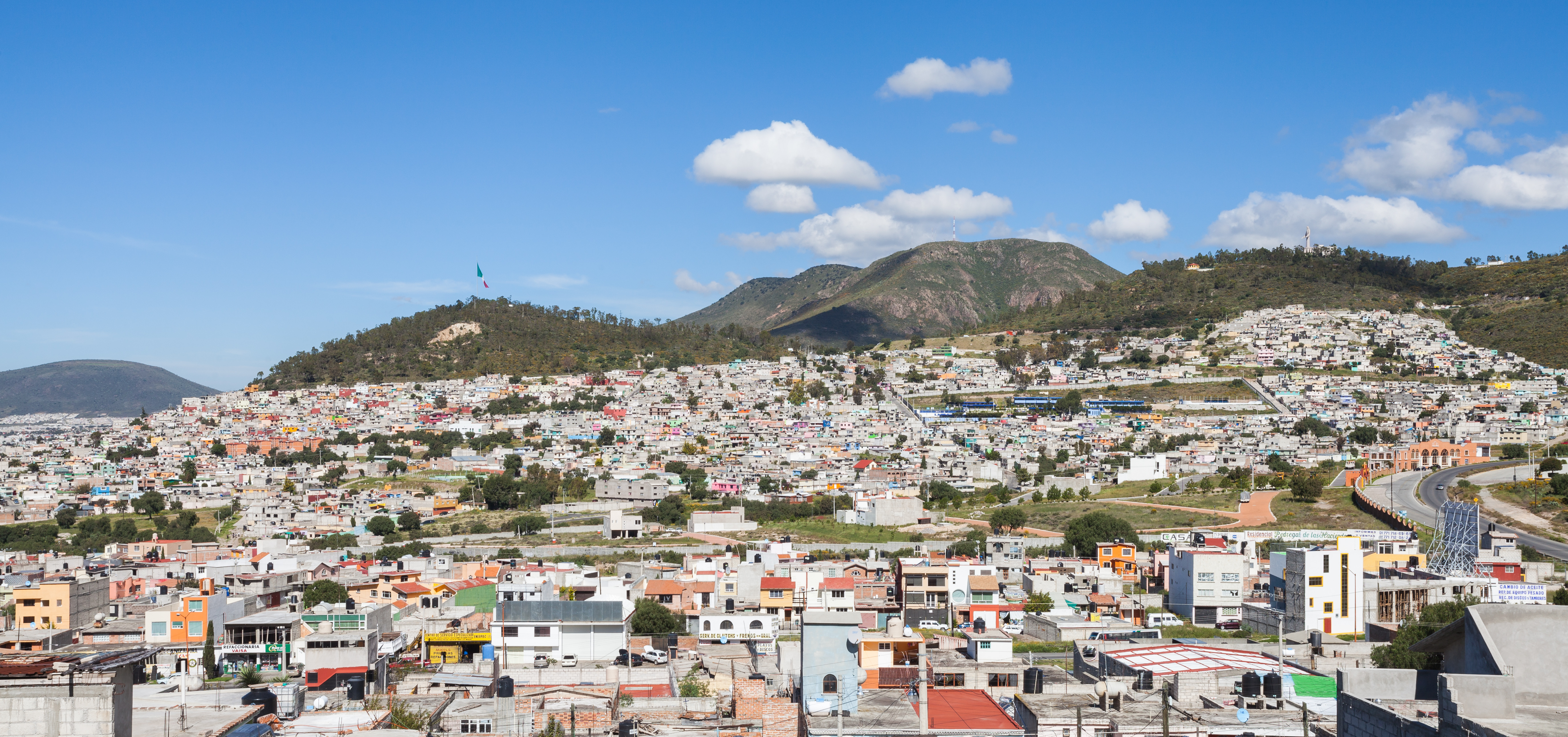
Pachuca de Soto, Hidalgo's capital and largest municipality by population.

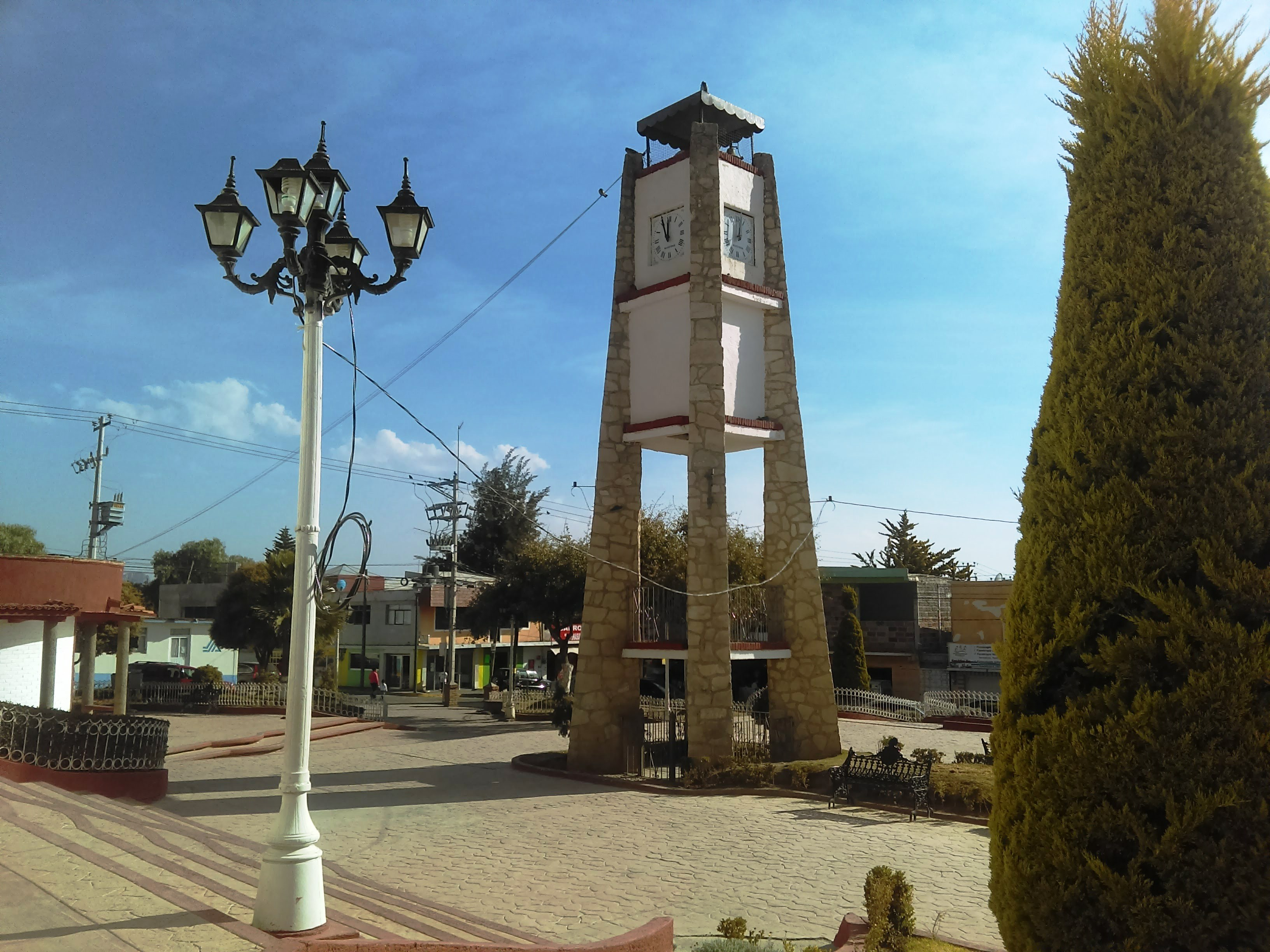
Mineral de la Reforma is the second largest municipality by population

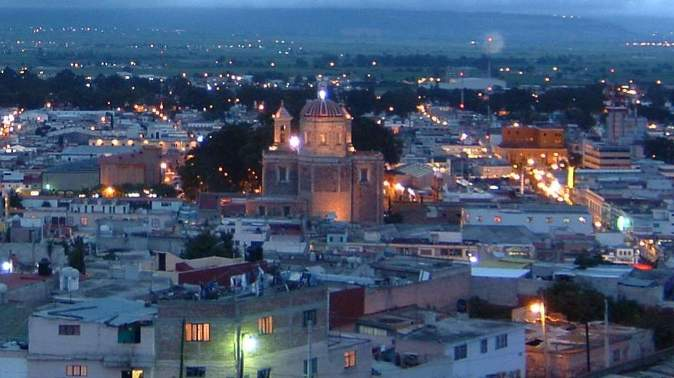
Tulancingo de Bravo is the third largest municipality by population

† State capital

Municipalities of Hidalgo
Name	Municipal seat	Population (2020)	Population (2010)	Change	Land area		Population density (2020)	Incorporation date (Note: The earliest year in which the municipality is referred to is listed if the actual creation date is unknown.)
Name	Municipal seat	Population (2020)	Population (2010)	Change	km^{2}	sq mi	Population density (2020)	Incorporation date
Acatlán	Acatlán	22,268	20,077	+10.9%	241.6	93.28	92.2/km^{2} (238.7/sq mi)	August 8, 1865
Acaxochitlán	Acaxochitlán	46,065	40,583	+13.5%	238.9	92.24	193.6/km^{2} (501.3/sq mi)	February 15, 1826
Actopan	Actopan	61,002	54,299	+12.3%	271.9	104.98	224.4/km^{2} (581.1/sq mi)	August 6, 1824
Agua Blanca de Iturbide	Agua Blanca de Iturbide	10,313	8,994	+14.7%	120.0	46.33	85.9/km^{2} (222.6/sq mi)	March 27, 1874
Ajacuba	Ajacuba	18,872	17,055	+10.7%	253.1	97.72	74.6/km^{2} (193.1/sq mi)	June 16, 1936
Alfajayucan	Alfajayucan	19,162	18,879	+1.5%	433.5	167.38	44.2/km^{2} (114.5/sq mi)	February 15, 1826
Almoloya	Almoloya	12,546	11,294	+11.1%	272.3	105.14	46.1/km^{2} (119.3/sq mi)	October 17, 1868
Apan	Apan	46,681	42,563	+9.7%	322.2	124.40	144.9/km^{2} (375.2/sq mi)	August 6, 1824
El Arenal	El Arenal	19,836	17,374	+14.2%	137.6	53.13	144.2/km^{2} (373.4/sq mi)	February 15, 1826
Atitalaquía	Atitalaquía	31,525	26,904	+17.2%	63.4	24.48	497.2/km^{2} (1,287.8/sq mi)	February 15, 1826
Atlapexco	Atlapexco	19,812	19,452	+1.9%	142.7	55.10	138.8/km^{2} (359.6/sq mi)	December 7, 1870
Atotonilco El Grande	Atotonilco El Grande	30,135	26,940	+11.9%	457.1	176.49	65.9/km^{2} (170.7/sq mi)	February 15, 1826
Atotonilco de Tula	Atotonilco de Tula	62,470	31,078	+101.0%	121.3	46.83	515.0/km^{2} (1,333.9/sq mi)	May 31, 1867
Calnali	Calnali	16,150	16,962	−4.8%	211.0	81.47	76.5/km^{2} (198.2/sq mi)	February 15, 1826
Cardonal	Cardonal	19,431	18,426	+5.5%	593.6	229.19	32.7/km^{2} (84.8/sq mi)	March 6, 1827
Cuautepec de Hinojosa	Cuautepec de Hinojosa	60,421	54,500	+10.9%	391.4	151.12	154.4/km^{2} (399.8/sq mi)	August 8, 1865
Chapantongo	Chapantongo	12,967	12,271	+5.7%	278.3	107.45	46.6/km^{2} (120.7/sq mi)	May 31, 1865
Chapulhuacán	Chapulhuacán	22,903	22,402	+2.2%	232.3	89.69	98.6/km^{2} (255.4/sq mi)	February 15, 1826
Chilcuautla	Chilcuautla	18,909	17,436	+8.4%	222.8	86.02	84.9/km^{2} (219.8/sq mi)	June 2, 1850
Eloxochitlán	Eloxochitlán	2,593	2,800	−7.4%	239.5	92.47	10.8/km^{2} (28.0/sq mi)	September 21, 1937
Emiliano Zapata	Emiliano Zapata	15,175	13,357	+13.6%	123.0	47.49	123.4/km^{2} (319.5/sq mi)	November 11, 1942
Epazoyucan	Epazoyucan	16,285	13,830	+17.8%	139.6	53.90	116.7/km^{2} (302.1/sq mi)	August 8, 1865
Francisco I. Madero	Tepatepec	36,248	33,901	+6.9%	105.0	40.54	345.2/km^{2} (894.1/sq mi)	May 16, 1927
Huasca de Ocampo	Huasca de Ocampo	17,607	17,182	+2.5%	302.8	116.91	58.1/km^{2} (150.6/sq mi)	February 15, 1826
Huautla	Huautla	20,673	22,621	−8.6%	292.3	112.86	70.7/km^{2} (183.2/sq mi)	February 15, 1826
Huazalingo	Huazalingo	12,766	12,779	−0.1%	107.5	41.51	118.8/km^{2} (307.6/sq mi)	February 15, 1826
Huehuetla	Huehuetla	22,846	23,563	−3.0%	214.8	82.93	106.4/km^{2} (275.5/sq mi)	April 26, 1827
Huejutla de Reyes	Huejutla de Reyes	126,781	122,905	+3.2%	394.1	152.16	321.7/km^{2} (833.2/sq mi)	August 6, 1824
Huichapan	Huichapan	47,425	44,253	+7.2%	660.7	255.10	71.8/km^{2} (185.9/sq mi)	March 11, 1824
Ixmiquilpan	Ixmiquilpan	98,654	86,363	+14.2%	486.6	187.88	202.7/km^{2} (525.1/sq mi)	August 6, 1824
Jacala de Ledezma	Jacala	12,290	12,804	−4.0%	441.0	170.27	27.9/km^{2} (72.2/sq mi)	February 15, 1826
Jaltocan	Jaltocan	10,523	10,933	−3.8%	48.8	18.84	267.1/km^{2} (691.7/sq mi)	February 15, 1826
Juárez Hidalgo	Juárez	2,895	3,193	−9.3%	38.4	14.83	75.4/km^{2} (195.3/sq mi)	October 1, 1920
Lolotla	Lolotla	9,474	9,843	−3.7%	177.1	68.38	53.5/km^{2} (138.6/sq mi)	February 15, 1826
Metepec	Metepec	13,078	11,429	+14.4%	146.3	56.49	89.4/km^{2} (231.5/sq mi)	August 8, 1865
San Agustín Metzquititlán	Mezquititlán	9,449	9,364	+0.9%	245.7	94.87	38.5/km^{2} (99.6/sq mi)	February 15, 1826
Metztitlán	Metztitlán	20,962	21,623	−3.1%	796.9	307.68	26.3/km^{2} (68.1/sq mi)	August 6, 1824
Mineral del Chico	Mineral del Chico	8,878	7,980	+11.3%	193.8	74.83	45.8/km^{2} (118.6/sq mi)	March 13, 1828
Mineral del Monte	Mineral del Monte	14,324	13,864	+3.3%	53.4	20.62	268.2/km^{2} (694.7/sq mi)	February 15, 1826
La Misión	La Misión	9,819	10,452	−6.1%	232.8	89.88	42.2/km^{2} (109.2/sq mi)	September 21, 1920
Mixquiahuala de Juárez	Mixquiahuala	47,222	42,843	+10.2%	136.6	52.74	345.7/km^{2} (895.3/sq mi)	February 15, 1826
Molango de Escamilla	Molango	11,578	11,209	+3.3%	198.3	76.56	58.4/km^{2} (151.3/sq mi)	February 15, 1826
Nicolás Flores	Nicolás Flores	6,265	6,614	−5.3%	249.7	96.41	25.1/km^{2} (65.0/sq mi)	March 3, 1870
Nopala de Villagrán	Nopala	16,948	15,666	+8.2%	341.3	131.78	49.7/km^{2} (128.6/sq mi)	February 15, 1826
Omitlán de Juárez	Omitlán de Juárez	9,295	8,963	+3.7%	79.7	30.77	116.6/km^{2} (302.1/sq mi)	August 8, 1865
San Felipe Orizatlán	Orizatlán	38,492	39,181	−1.8%	323.9	125.06	118.8/km^{2} (307.8/sq mi)	February 15, 1826
Pacula	Pacula	4,748	5,049	−6.0%	385.2	148.73	12.3/km^{2} (31.9/sq mi)	January 16, 1869
Pachuca de Soto†	Pachuca	314,331	267,862	+17.3%	154.1	59.50	2,039.8/km^{2} (5,283.0/sq mi)	August 6, 1824
Pisaflores	Pisaflores	18,723	18,244	+2.6%	180.2	69.58	103.9/km^{2} (269.1/sq mi)	August 25, 1877
Progreso de Obregón	Progreso	23,641	22,217	+6.4%	91.0	35.14	259.8/km^{2} (672.9/sq mi)	January 8, 1970
Mineral de la Reforma	Pachuquilla	202,749	127,404	+59.1%	115.2	44.48	1,760.0/km^{2} (4,558.3/sq mi)	April 13, 1920
San Agustín Tlaxiaca	San Agustín Tlaxiaca	38,891	32,057	+21.3%	297.2	114.75	130.9/km^{2} (338.9/sq mi)	October 16, 1872
San Bartolo Tutotepec	San Bartolo Tutotepec	17,699	18,137	−2.4%	358.5	138.42	49.4/km^{2} (127.9/sq mi)	August 8, 1865
San Salvador	San Salvador	36,796	32,773	+12.3%	205.7	79.42	178.9/km^{2} (463.3/sq mi)	December 28, 1870
Santiago de Anaya	Santiago de Anaya	18,329	16,014	+14.5%	256.2	98.92	71.5/km^{2} (185.3/sq mi)	December 28, 1870
Santiago Tulantepec	Santiago Tulantepec	39,561	33,495	+18.1%	64.3	24.83	615.3/km^{2} (1,593.5/sq mi)	April 1, 1944
Singuilucan	Singuilucan	15,142	14,851	+2.0%	420.2	162.24	36.0/km^{2} (93.3/sq mi)	March 6, 1827
Tasquillo	Tasquillo	17,441	16,865	+3.4%	240.0	92.66	72.7/km^{2} (188.2/sq mi)	February 15, 1861
Tecozautla	Tecozautla	38,010	35,067	+8.4%	535.1	206.60	71.0/km^{2} (184.0/sq mi)	May 31, 1865
Tenango de Doria	Tenango de Doria	17,503	17,206	+1.7%	176.6	68.19	99.1/km^{2} (256.7/sq mi)	February 15, 1826
Tepeapulco	Tepeapulco	56,245	51,664	+8.9%	242.9	93.78	231.6/km^{2} (599.7/sq mi)	February 15, 1826
Tepehuacán de Guerrero	Tepehuacán de Guerrero	31,235	29,125	+7.2%	347.3	134.09	89.9/km^{2} (232.9/sq mi)	September 28, 1882
Tepeji del Río	Tepeji del Rio de Ocampo	90,546	80,612	+12.3%	353.4	136.45	256.2/km^{2} (663.6/sq mi)	August 8, 1865
Tepetitlán	Tepetitlán	10,830	9,940	+9.0%	147.9	57.10	73.2/km^{2} (189.7/sq mi)	September 29, 1871
Tetepango	Tetepango	11,768	11,112	+5.9%	44.9	17.34	262.1/km^{2} (678.8/sq mi)	August 8, 1865
Villa de Tezontepec	Tezontepec	13,032	11,654	+11.8%	90.7	35.02	143.7/km^{2} (372.1/sq mi)	August 8, 1865
Tezontepec de Aldama	Tezontepec de Aldama	55,134	48,025	+14.8%	163.3	63.05	337.6/km^{2} (874.4/sq mi)	May 31, 1865
Tianguistengo	Tianguistengo	14,340	14,037	+2.2%	255.5	98.65	56.1/km^{2} (145.4/sq mi)	February 15, 1826
Tizayuca	Tizayuca	168,302	97,461	+72.7%	76.7	29.61	2,194.3/km^{2} (5,683.2/sq mi)	February 15, 1826
Tlahuelilpan	Tlahuelilpan	19,067	17,153	+11.2%	28.2	10.89	676.1/km^{2} (1,751.2/sq mi)	November 8, 1969
Tlahuiltepa	Tlahuiltepa	9,086	9,753	−6.8%	531.6	205.25	17.1/km^{2} (44.3/sq mi)	September 29, 1871
Tlanalapa	Tlanalapa	11,113	10,284	+8.1%	82.9	32.01	134.1/km^{2} (347.2/sq mi)	August 8, 1865
Tlanchinol	Tlanchinol	37,722	36,382	+3.7%	392.1	151.39	96.2/km^{2} (249.2/sq mi)	February 15, 1826
Tlaxcoapan	Tlaxcoapan	28,626	26,758	+7.0%	42.3	16.33	676.7/km^{2} (1,752.7/sq mi)	May 31, 1865
Tolcayuca	Tolcayuca	21,362	13,228	+61.5%	117.2	45.25	182.3/km^{2} (472.1/sq mi)	August 8, 1865
Tula de Allende	Tula de Allende	115,107	103,919	+10.8%	336.1	129.77	342.5/km^{2} (887.0/sq mi)	August 6, 1824
Tulancingo de Bravo	Tulancingo	168,369	151,584	+11.1%	217.4	83.94	774.5/km^{2} (2,005.9/sq mi)	August 6, 1824
Xochiatipan	Xochiatipan	18,260	19,067	−4.2%	135.4	52.28	134.9/km^{2} (349.3/sq mi)	March 6, 1827
Xochicoatlán	Xochicoatlán	7,015	7,320	−4.2%	187.1	72.24	37.5/km^{2} (97.1/sq mi)	February 15, 1826
Yahualica	Yahualica	24,674	23,607	+4.5%	154.4	59.61	159.8/km^{2} (413.9/sq mi)	August 6, 1824
Zacualtipan de Ángeles	Zacualtipan	38,155	32,437	+17.6%	272.7	105.29	139.9/km^{2} (362.4/sq mi)	April 8, 1825
Zapotlán de Juárez	Zapotlán de Juárez	21,443	18,036	+18.9%	117.0	45.17	183.3/km^{2} (474.7/sq mi)	September 8, 1935
Zempoala	Zempoala	57,906	39,143	+47.9%	317.9	122.74	182.2/km^{2} (471.8/sq mi)	August 6, 1824
Zimapán	Zimapán	39,927	38,516	+3.7%	824.2	318.23	48.4/km^{2} (125.5/sq mi)	August 6, 1824
Hidalgo	—	3,082,841	2,665,018	+15.7%	20,813	8,035.94	148.1/km^{2} (383.6/sq mi)	—
Mexico	—	126,014,024	112,336,538	+12.2%	1,972,550	761,606	63.9/km^{2} (165.5/sq mi)	—
