= Huejutla de Reyes =

- City and municipality
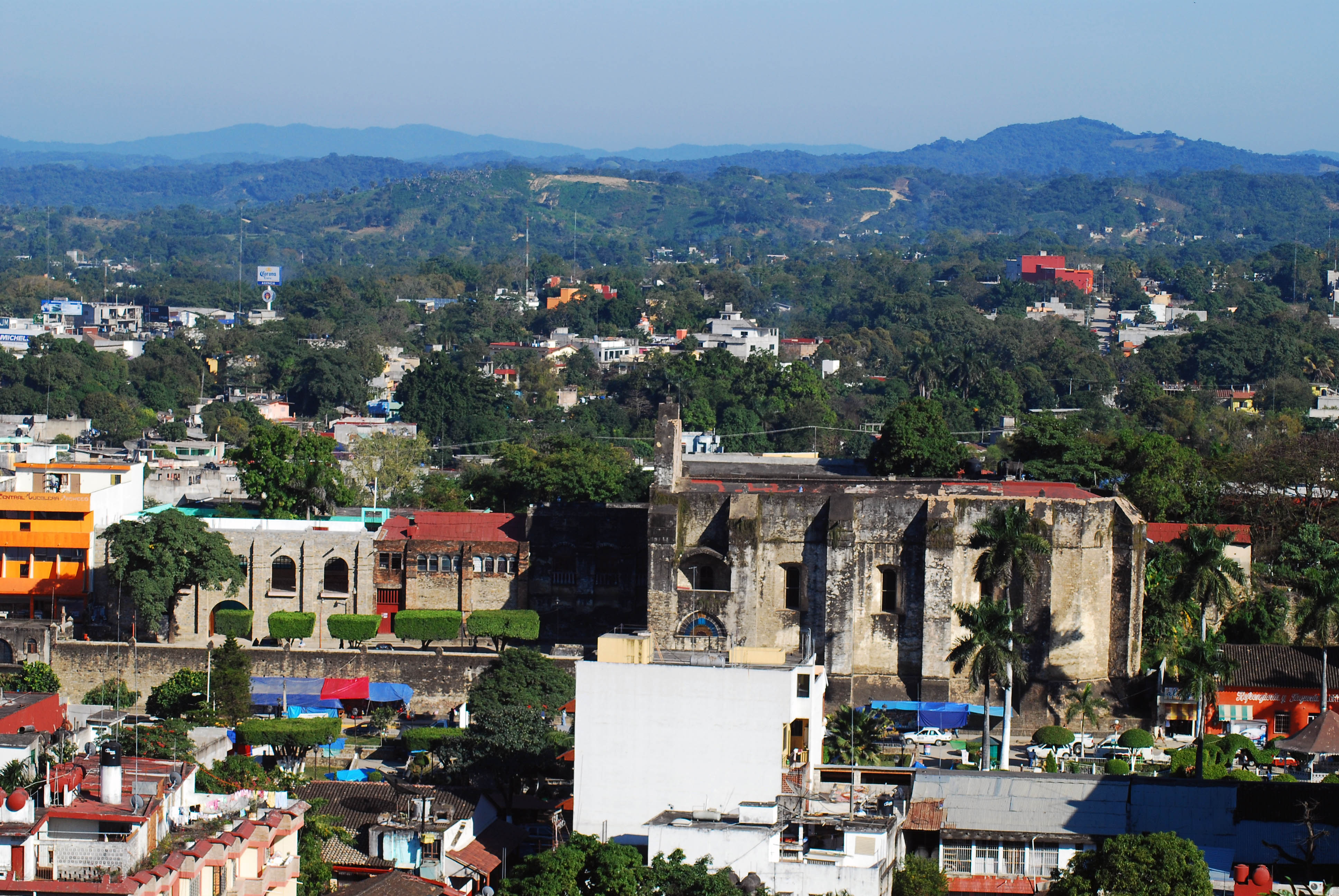

- Coat of arms

- Location within Hidalgo Location within Mexico
- Coordinates: 21°08′N 98°25′W
- Country: Mexico
- State: Hidalgo
- Municipality: Huejutla

Government
  - Federal electoral district: Hidalgo's 1st

Area
  - Total: 377.8 km^{2} (145.9 sq mi)

Population (2005)
  - Total: 115,786
- Time zone: UTC-6 (Zona Centro)

Huejutla de Reyes is a city and one of the 84 municipalities of Hidalgo, in central-eastern Mexico. The name comes from the Nahuatl huexotl ("willow") and tlan ("place"), while "de Reyes" commemorates local cobbler Antonio Reyes Cabrera who died defending Huejutla from French invaders in 1866.

The municipality covers an area of 377.8 km^{2} in the northeast of Hidalgo, in the Huasteca region, on the border with the state of Veracruz. As of 2005, the municipality had a total population of 115,786. but only 36,305 live in the metropolitan area, whereas the remaining population live in various small communities. Around 73,200 people speak indigenous languages, primarily Huasteca Nahuatl.

It has been called "the Heart of La Huasteca".

== History ==
Some aspects of the prehispanic history of the town are documented in the relacion of Uexutla. For instance, according to this document, the last pagan ruler of Huejutla was named Cocotecuhtli and was believed to control the rain and the fertility of the earth. The cult of Tezcatlipoca had a particular importance here, and child sacrifice and bloodletting were practiced. Priests were painted black and served for year-long terms, and during this time were not allowed to bathe or have sexual relations with their wives.

Prehispanic Huejutla was agriculturally productive and a significant center for regional trade, with goods such as salt coming from as far as Campeche and possibly attracting Aztec, Cholultec and Tepehua merchants. It ruled over at least twelve lesser settlements, extending for a radius of 20 to 30 Spanish leagues. Although it was primarily inhabited by ethnic Nahuas, Tepehuas were also found in the area. At some point, perhaps during the reign of Moctezuma II, it was conquered by the Aztec Empire. However, according to Fray Juan de Torquemada, it was conquered earlier and the population rebelled by assaulting Aztec officials and refusing to deliver tribute, forcing Ahuitzotl to reconquer the area.

== Geography ==
=== Climate ===
Huejutla de Reyes has a tropical monsoon climate (Köppen Am) featuring short, but extremely hot springs and also short, warm winters with cool mornings. The average high temperature in June is 34.4 °C (93.9 °F), with an average minimum temperature in June of 21.5 °C (70.7 °F). The average high temperature in January is 24.5 °C (76.1 °F), with an average minimum temperature in January of 11.5 °C (52.7 °F). The highest temperature ever recorded in Huejutla de Reyes is 50.0 °C (122 °F), recorded on April 26, 2017. A low temperature of -3.0 °C (26.6 °F) was recorded on December 14, 1997. Annual precipitation is 1,463.7 millimetres (57.626 in); July and September being the wettest months.

Climate data for Huejutla de Reyes, Hidalgo (1981–2010, extremes (1977–present)
Month	Jan	Feb	Mar	Apr	May	Jun	Jul	Aug	Sep	Oct	Nov	Dec	Year
Record high °C (°F)	38.0 (100.4)	38.0 (100.4)	41.0 (105.8)	50.0 (122.0)	49.0 (120.2)	47.0 (116.6)	42.0 (107.6)	39.0 (102.2)	40.0 (104.0)	38.0 (100.4)	38.0 (100.4)	34.0 (93.2)	50.0 (122.0)
Mean daily maximum °C (°F)	24.5 (76.1)	26.3 (79.3)	29.0 (84.2)	32.0 (89.6)	34.0 (93.2)	34.4 (93.9)	33.1 (91.6)	33.5 (92.3)	32.0 (89.6)	30.3 (86.5)	27.4 (81.3)	25.1 (77.2)	30.1 (86.2)
Daily mean °C (°F)	18.0 (64.4)	19.3 (66.7)	21.8 (71.2)	24.9 (76.8)	27.1 (80.8)	27.9 (82.2)	27.0 (80.6)	27.1 (80.8)	26.2 (79.2)	24.2 (75.6)	21.2 (70.2)	18.8 (65.8)	23.6 (74.5)
Mean daily minimum °C (°F)	11.5 (52.7)	12.2 (54.0)	14.6 (58.3)	17.8 (64.0)	20.3 (68.5)	21.5 (70.7)	20.9 (69.6)	20.8 (69.4)	20.3 (68.5)	18.2 (64.8)	14.9 (58.8)	12.4 (54.3)	17.1 (62.8)
Record low °C (°F)	−1.0 (30.2)	2.0 (35.6)	2.0 (35.6)	6.0 (42.8)	10.5 (50.9)	12.0 (53.6)	10.0 (50.0)	11.5 (52.7)	8.0 (46.4)	7.0 (44.6)	3.0 (37.4)	−3.0 (26.6)	−3.0 (26.6)
Average precipitation mm (inches)	48.8 (1.92)	48.7 (1.92)	51.3 (2.02)	65.0 (2.56)	92.5 (3.64)	177.3 (6.98)	225.5 (8.88)	190.3 (7.49)	278.6 (10.97)	167.7 (6.60)	67.9 (2.67)	50.1 (1.97)	1,463.7 (57.63)
Average precipitation days (≥ 0.1 mm)	8.0	6.9	5.5	5.6	5.1	8.5	12.3	9.8	12.3	8.6	6.9	6.9	96.4
Source: Servicio Meteorológico Nacional (Average temperatures, 1981-2010 - Extreme temperatures, 1977–2014)

== Sister cities ==
- Brownsville, United States (2009)
