= Economy of the State of Hidalgo =

Economy of a state of Mexico

Economy of Hidalgo
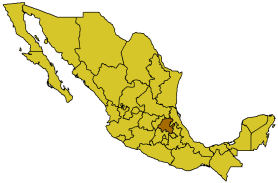

Statistics
- Population: 3,082,841
- GDP: $24,400,000,000
- Unemployment: 1.95%
- All values, unless otherwise stated, are in US dollars.

The economy of the Mexican state of Hidalgo is based on a free market system. Its gross domestic product (GDP) in 2024 was $31.8 billion USD, contributing 1.72% to Mexico's national GDP.

Hidalgo's largest economic sectors are producing manufacturing, textile manufacturing, and metallurgy. Hidalgo's exports comprise industrial machinery, transportation technology, and mineral products.

The state of Hidalgo is traditionally a mining center. The main products extracted from its soil are sulfur, zinc, and lead; silver and gold are also extracted, although reserves have largely been depleted. Agriculturally, the main crops include alfalfa, maguey, sugarcane, barley, beans, and coffee. Hidalgo's waters have carp, trout, and a small lake fish called charal.

== Economic indicators ==
=== Gross domestic product ===
GDP Hidalgo. Percentage share in current values (preliminary figures)
Sector of economic activity	Percentage
Primary Activities	3.67
Agriculture, animal husbandry and exploitation, forestry, fishing and hunting	3.67
Side Activities	41.98
Mining	1.06
Generation, transmission, and distribution of electricity, water, and gas supply by pipelines to the final consumer	2.52
Construction	9.56
Manufacturing	28.84
Tertiary activities	54.35
Commerce	14.38
Temporary lodging and food and beverage preparation services	1.87
Transport and Information in the Mass Media	8.91
Financial & Real Estate Services	13.79
Educational & Medical Services	9.07
Government Activities	4.52
Other services	1.81
Source: INEGI (2015).

The gross domestic product of Hidalgo amounted to 276,784 million pesos in 2014, and the GDP per capita was 97,364 pesos.

Manufacturing industries are the most important sector in Hidalgo; these industries contributed 33.3% of Hidalgo's GDP in 2003 in current pesos. This contribution decreased to 29% in 2014, due to a low real average annual growth of 0.7% from 2003 to 2014. Among the sectors that grew the most during this period were financial and insurance services, information, and mass media, which presented average annual real growth rates of 13.3 and 9.4%, respectively, figures well above the 2.7% reached by the total GDP of the state in the period. Tula de Allende concentrates almost half of the wealth generation in the state, contributing 0.34% of the gross domestic product (GDP). However, according to the Mexican Business Information System (MBIS), there are very few companies in that region. Tula contributes 47.6 percent of the state's gross domestic product (GDP), and Pachuca de Soto contributes 13.6 percent of the wealth, so between the two cities they concentrate more than 60 percent of the total value.

=== Human Development Index ===
The most recent information (2023) places Hidalgo with a state Human Development Index of 0.77 (High), comparable to Azerbaijan. The gross domestic product of Hidalgo in 2014 represented 1.7% of the national total and, compared to the previous year, had an increase of 0.12%. As of December 2025, the unemployment rate was 1.95%.

In 2010, Mineral de la Reforma was the municipality with the highest human development in Hidalgo, with an HDI of 0.822; in contrast, the municipality with the lowest performance in the state is Tepehuacán de Guerrero, whose HDI is 0.537. The development gap between the two municipalities is 34.6%.

Comparing the difference in development of the municipalities to countries, in Hidalgo there are development conditions similar to those of Barbados and the Lao People's Democratic Republic.

The 10 highest HDIs by municipality (2010).

Stand		Municipality	HDI
2010 Report	Change from 2005 report	Municipality	2010 Report
1	▲ (1)	Mineral de la Reforma	0.822
2	▼ (1)	Pachuca de Soto	0.803
3	▲ (7)	Mineral del Monte	0.759
4	▲ (1)	Tizayuca	0.758
5	▼ (2)	Tepeapulco	0.757
6	Steady	Tlanalapa	0.748
7	▼ (3)	Tula de Allende	0.748
8	▲ (1)	Progreso	0.746
9	▲ (11)	Actopan	0.743
10	▲ (1)	Atotonilco de Tula	0.742

The 10 lowest HDIs by municipality (2010).

Stand		Municipality	HDI
2010 Report	Change from 2005 report	Municipality	2010 Report
75	▲ (7)	Yahualica	0.574
76	▲ (1)	Flower Footsteps	0.574
77	▼ (2)	Acaxochitlán	0.570
78	▲ (2)	Huehuetla	0.570
79	▲ (4)	San Bartolo Tutotepec	0.568
80	▲ (4)	Xochiatipan	0.567
81	▼ (16)	Tenango de Doria	0.567
82	▼ (16)	Calnali	0.558
83	▼ (7)	The Mission	0.542
84	▼ (3)	Tepehuacán de Guerrero	0.537

=== Economically active population and employed personnel ===
In 2013, the total number of people employed was 353,978; of these, 50.4% corresponded to paid employed personnel; 37.5% to owners, family members, and other workers, who collaborated for the economic unit without receiving remuneration, and 12.1% were made up of personnel who are non-dependent on the company name. For the total employed personnel, 33.1% were concentrated in Commerce, 32.4% in Non-Financial Private Services, and 25.7% in Manufacturing.

By the third quarter of 2016, the Economically Active Population (EAP) amounted to 1,230,173 people, of whom 61.7% were men and 38.3% were women. In total, the EAP represented 57.64% of the working-age population. Of the total EAP, 97.33% was occupied and 2.67% unoccupied. Of the total, 798,603 were salaried, 290,541 were self-employed, 48,304 were employers, and 59,909 were unpaid.

=== Poverty and social marginalization ===
Percentage and number of people by poverty indicator.
Indicator	Population	Percentage of population
Moderate poverty	1,197,356	42.0%
Extreme poverty	350 456	12.3%
Vulnerable due to social deprivation	735 629	25.8%
Income Vulnerable	145 501	5.1%
Not poor and not vulnerable	421 354	14.8%
Unspecified	8063
Source: Estimates by the CONEVAL, 2014.

According to the National Council for the Evaluation of Social Development Policy in 2014, 54.3% of the total population lived in poverty, of which 42.0% were in moderate poverty, and 12.3% were in extreme poverty. According to measurements, in 2008, 55.0% of the population was in poverty; by 2010, it decreased to 54.8%, by 2012, it decreased to 52.8%, and by 2014, the percentage increased again to 54.3%. The municipalities with the highest percentage of their population living in poverty were Yahualica, Xochiatipan, Tepehuacán de Guerrero, Huehuetla, and Calnali. The municipalities with the lowest percentage of their population living in extreme poverty were: Mineral de la Reforma, Pachuca de Soto, Tizayuca, Atotonilco de Tula, and Tepeji del Río de Ocampo. On the other hand, those with the highest concentration of people in poverty were: Pachuca de Soto, Huejutla de Reyes, Tulancingo de Bravo, Ixmiquilpan, Tula de Allende.

The municipalities with the highest percentage of the population living in extreme poverty were: Xochiatipan, Yahualica, Huehuetla, Tepehuacán de Guerrero and San Felipe Orizatlán. The municipalities with the lowest percentage of their population living in extreme poverty were: Mineral de la Reforma, Pachuca de Soto, Tizayuca, Atotonilco de Tula and Tepeapulco.

19.1% of the population is behind in education; 17.3% lack access to health services; 68.9% lack access to social security; 9.2% lack access to housing; 27.0% lack basic services in their homes, and 31.7% lack access to food.

The three municipalities with the highest degree of marginalization in the state are: Huehuetla, Yahualica and Xochiatipan. The five municipalities with the lowest degree of marginalization in the state are: Pachuca de Soto, Mineral de la Reforma, Tepeapulco, Tizayuca, and Atitalaquia.

== Economic sectors ==
=== Primary activities ===
The primary activities include agriculture, ranching, fishing, and forestry. The territory of Hidalgo has an area of 2.1 million hectares. 29% are used for agriculture, 39% for livestock, 22% for forest areas, 9% for urban areas, roads, facilities, and similar, and only 1% is occupied by bodies of water.

==== Agriculture ====
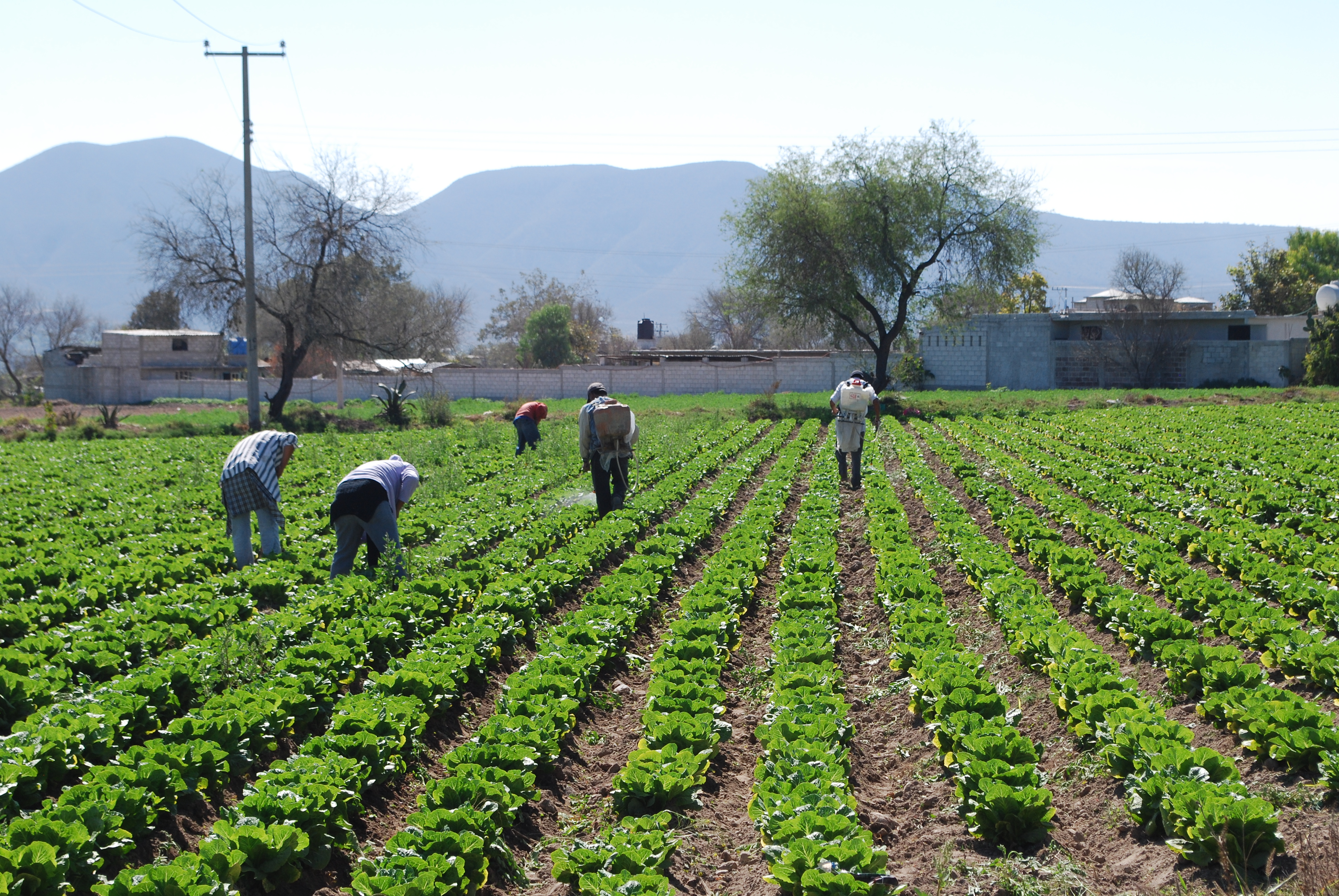
Cabbage field in the community of El Nith, Ixmiquilpan.

The agricultural area planted in 2013 was 576,907 hectares, of which 146,428 hectares were irrigated (25.4%) and 430,479 hectares were rainfed (74.6%). Of the seventy-six crops planted in the state, the main ones in account of planted area were corn (44%), barley (19%), alfalfa (8%), bean (6%), fodder oats (5%), cherry coffee (4%), and pastures (4%), which together account for 91% of the total area.

The production volume of 7,557,117 tons, in turn, 5,732,467 tons were produced in irrigation (75.9%) and 1,824,650 tons in rainfed (24.1%). The main crops in terms of production are: alfalfa (58%), pastures (12%), corn (9%), forage oats (7%), maguey (6%), and barley (2%), that add up to 93% of the state's production. The value of production amounted to 8,015,293,000 pesos, 4,018,827,000 pesos (50.1%) in irrigation, and 3,996,466,000 pesos (49.9%) in rainfall.

The irrigated area is 154,000 ha, comprising 90,000 hectares of the Irrigation Districts and the rest corresponding to the 646 Irrigation Units, located mainly in the Tulancingo and Tecozautla Valleys. 66% of the irrigated area is located in the Rural Development District of Mixquiahuala; 13.83% in the Rural Development District of Huichapan; 9.6% in the Rural Development District of Tulancingo and the remaining 10.57% is distributed in the Rural Development Districts of Huejutla, Zacualtipán and Pachuca. The largest agricultural area is the one bathed by the Tula River. The production of non-traditional crops for the production of innovative products, such as preparations based on amaranth, xoconostle, and maguey honey.

Hidalgo is the first state in Mexico in the production of grain barley, coriander seed, pulquero maguey, lion's hand and forage turnip; in second place of national production are green alfalfa, alstroemeria (coarse), peas, pomegranate, cloud and Zempoaxochitl. In third place: canola, green fodder barley, green beans and figs; in fourth place nationally: olives, oats, grain oats, sugar cane other uses, peas, cauliflower, beans and prickly pears; and fifth: artichoke, raspberry and radish.

Prickly pears, apples, citrus, and coffee are also significant crops.

==== Ranching ====
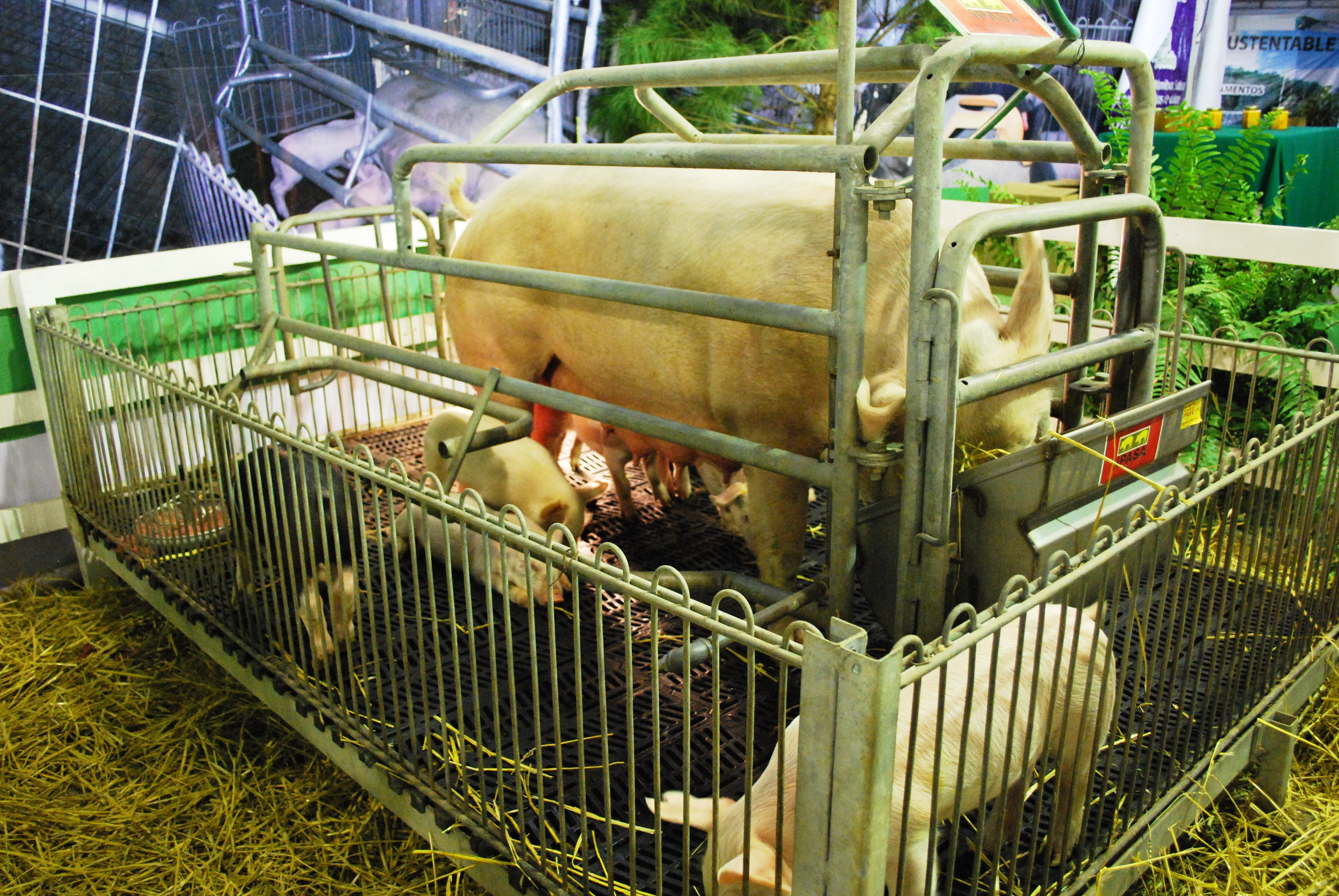
Livestock exhibition in Pachuca de Soto.

The volume of livestock production during the year 2013 was 545,000, of which 109,732 tons were carcass meat, highlighting the production of sheep. The value of livestock production amounted to 8.015 billion pesos. Its main products are classified into three categories: carcass meat with a share of 20.6%, milk 78.0%, and other products 1.4%.

In turn, the most prominent products were milk from bovine livestock at 78%, carcass meat from poultry 10.8%, bovine carcass meat at 5.9%, carcass meat pork at 2.2%, and carcass meat sheep at 1.4%, which together represent 98.2% of the state's livestock production.

Hidalgo has a wide tradition of sheep ranching concentrated in the regions of Apan, Tulancingo de Bravo, Tizayuca, Actopan and Ixmiquilpan. There are seven slaughterhouses and nineteen slaughterhouses, which have coverage in twenty-eight municipalities of the state, with fifty-six municipalities without a registered establishment.

The products that stand out in their production at the national level are: 2nd place in Sheep carcass meat, 9th place in bovine milk, 6th place in meat in the Guajolote Canal, 15th place in Poultry carcass meat and bee honey.

==== Fishing and aquaculture ====
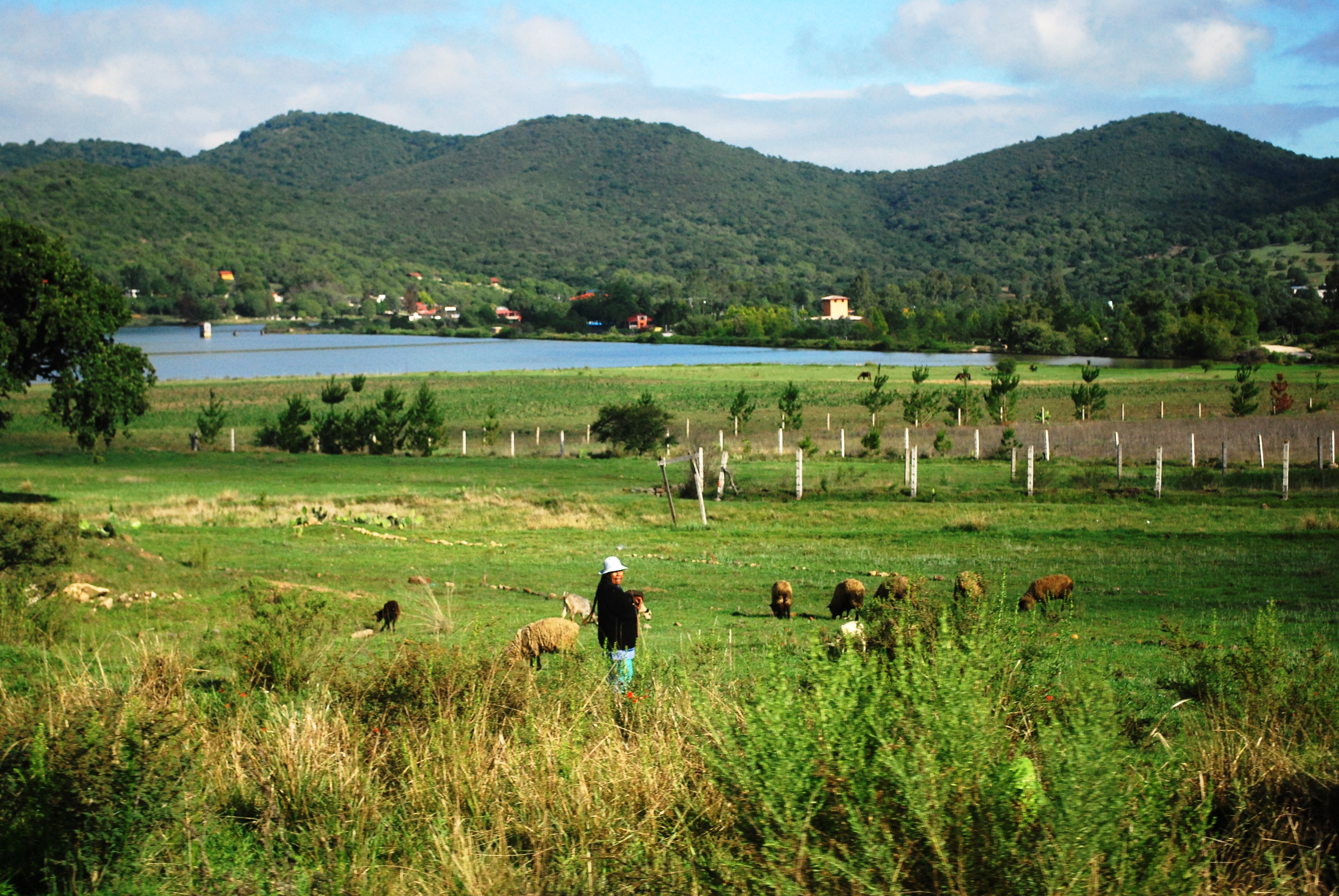
Seedbeds, livestock grazing, as well as trout fishing; at the dam of San Antonio Rule in Huasca de Ocampo.

Aquaculture production in the state has gained relevance in recent years, with the consolidation of the trout and tilapia production chains. During the 2013 cycle, there was a production volume of 8,000 tons with a production value of 193.5 million pesos.

The volume of fishing production in Hidalgo is 8,000 tons, ranking 2nd nationally in fishing production in states without coastline. The main species are carp, with 55.6% participation in production, mojarra, with 39.1%, and trout, with 3.7%, which represent 98.4% of production state.

It is a state with important fishing and aquaculture activities; produces annually: 3,531.3 tons with a value of 52.2 million pesos. The main species caught are mojarra, tilapia, carp, trout and charal.

The majority of fishing production in the state is reported without an official record, because the vast majority is destined for self-consumption, there are not enough organized groups, and, consequently, there is no National Fisheries Registry.

==== Forestry ====
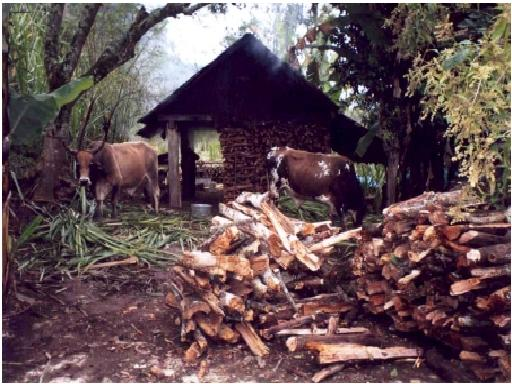
Silviculture in Calnali.

In Hidalgo, there is a wooded area of temperate forest, where timber species such as pine, oyamel, white cedar and oak are found, the first three belonging to the group of the conifers, and the last to the arboreal group of the broad-leaf trees. The forest area of the state is 817 640 hectares, of which 454 486 are forest, 252,036 are arid zones and 13,184 are other formations. Forestry contributed just under 1% of the state's GDP.

According to the State's forest inventory, the land susceptible to reforestation can reach up to 743,224 hectares, of which only 2,500 are reforested on an annual average, despite having an infrastructure for the production of plants from more than 60 nurseries in dependencies, communities and municipalities. This is due to reforestation programs being generally short-term with limited social participation, insufficient resources, technological obsolescence, and in work processes, from the collection of germplasm to the evaluation of reforestation.

Forestry activity in the State contributed just under 1% of the GDP. Timber forest production in 2009 was 110,000 cubic meters in rolls, with a value of 107.5 million pesos. The process of deforestation goes beyond the reforestation actions carried out by the various agencies, organizations, and the social sector.

In 1997, only 28,000 hectares were exploited, representing 12 per cent of the previous area; in other words, there is a potential of 88% of this area that can later be incorporated into commercial exploitation. Of these 28,000 hectares, 63% correspond to ejidos of the entity and the remaining 27 percent to small property, that is, most of the forest resources are located on communal property areas and are therefore, exploited jointly by the inhabitants of said ejido, the rest of the forest area is used by small owners.

=== Secondary activities ===
This sector refers to industrial activities, those that transform the resources of the primary sector. Considering the number of companies installed in the state, the sectors with the greatest participation in the industry are: textile, metal-mechanical, automotive, construction, food, furniture, jewelry, leather, footwear, chemical, and plastic.

==== Mining ====
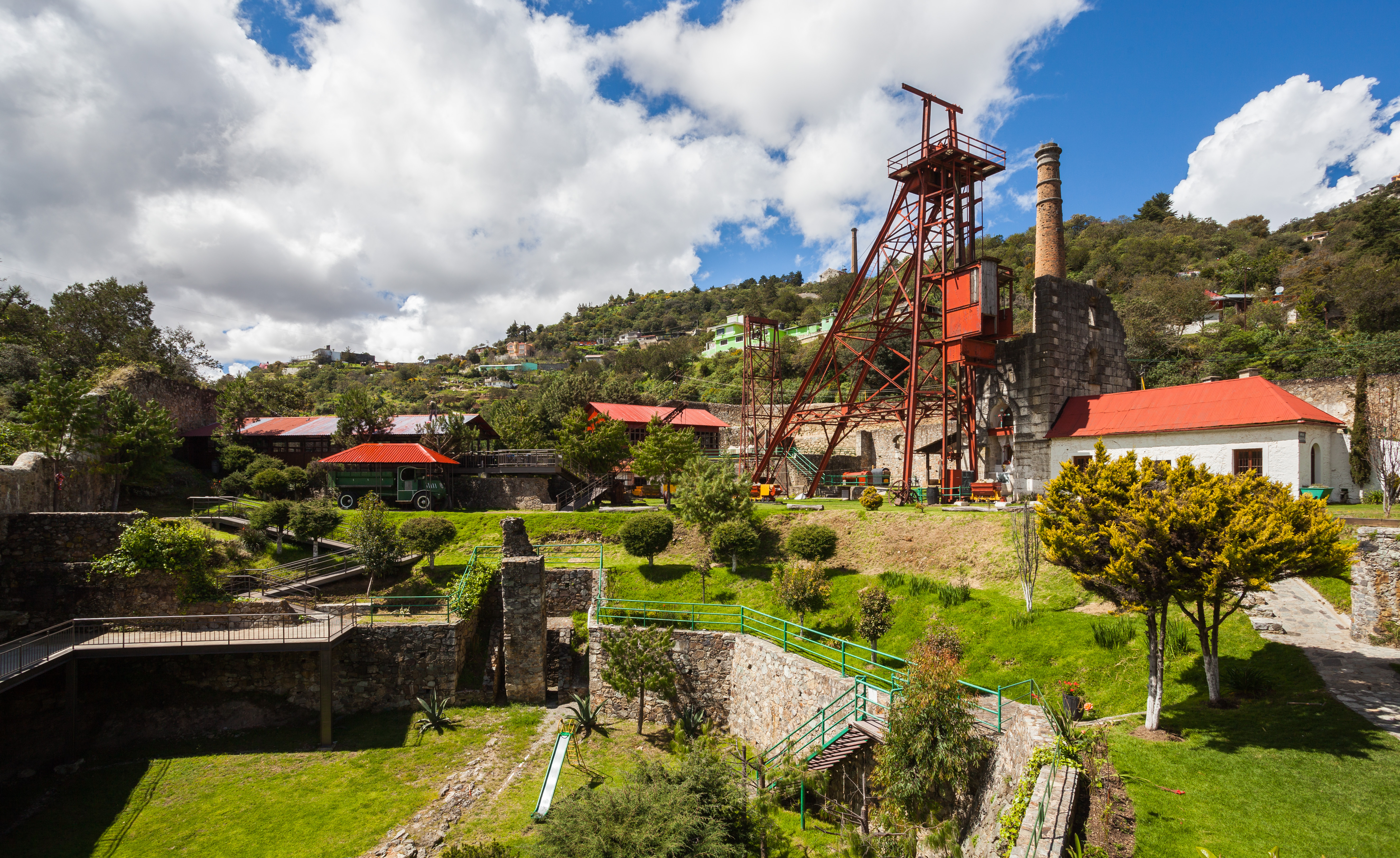
The Acosta mine in Mineral del Monte began operations in 1727 and continued its production until 1985.

Mining is one of the oldest industries, with a long tradition in the state. Mining in the state of Hidalgo accounts for 1.06% of the state's GDP. About 75.4% of the value of mining production corresponds to non-metallic minerals, highlighting gravel, sand and limestone.

Approximately forty-five mines are mined in the state; the municipalities of Tula de Allende, Francisco I. Madero and Zimapán, are producers of limestone deposits, they also produce stone aggregates such as gravel, sand and road seals, and produce raw materials for the production of lime and cement. In Huichapan, Tecozautla and Chapantongo, there are quarry deposits for the construction industry. In Zimapán there are deposits of calcium carbonate. The municipalities of Agua Blanca de Iturbide and Metepec have deposits of kaolin, an input in the production of the cement industry. Tepehuacán de Guerrero has one of the state's largest veins of manganese, contributing to 89% of the state's total manganese production.

The Pachuca-Real del Monte Mining District is located north of the Mexico Basin, in the Sierra de Pachuca, in the metallogenetic province called Neovolcanic Axis, which explains the presence of polymetallic deposits of silver, lead, zinc, copper, and gold. This district is divided into two areas: Pachuca and Real del Monte.

The mining district of Zimapán is located in the western portion of the state of Hidalgo. This district is made up of a considerable number of mining works that include mines, shafts, and levels, among others, where the Las Ánimas and Lomo de Toro mines have been the most relevant. The morphology of the mineral bodies of the Zimapán mining district is represented by mantles, chimneys and disseminations in both the intrusive and the skarn.

The Molango mining district is located in the northeastern portion of Hidalgo, approximately 260 km northeast of Mexico City, covering an area of approximately 1250 km^{2}. The deposit is divided into two parts, to the north Tetzintla, with a mineralogy composed of: manganocalcite, kutnahorite, rhodochrosite, and calcite with accessory minerals of clay, quartz, pyrite, magnetite, and plianite. In the southern part of the site (Nonoalco) the mineralogy is composed of nsutite with small amounts of psilomelane, pyrolusite, cryptomelane and hausmanite.

Volume of mineral production in tonnes
Mineral	Year 2003	Year 2004	Year 2005	Year 2006	Year 2007
Gold	79.1	43.8	41.6	7.1	11.5
Silver	25,360	17,448	17,448	30,582	15,614
Lead	1057	1057	1331	——	4428
Copper	118	118	254	1,068	1,437
Zinc	4775	4775	6616	——	16,687
Manganese	114.550	114.550	135.896	132.872	——
Sulphur	——	61,026	——	33,175	54,414

==== Food industry ====
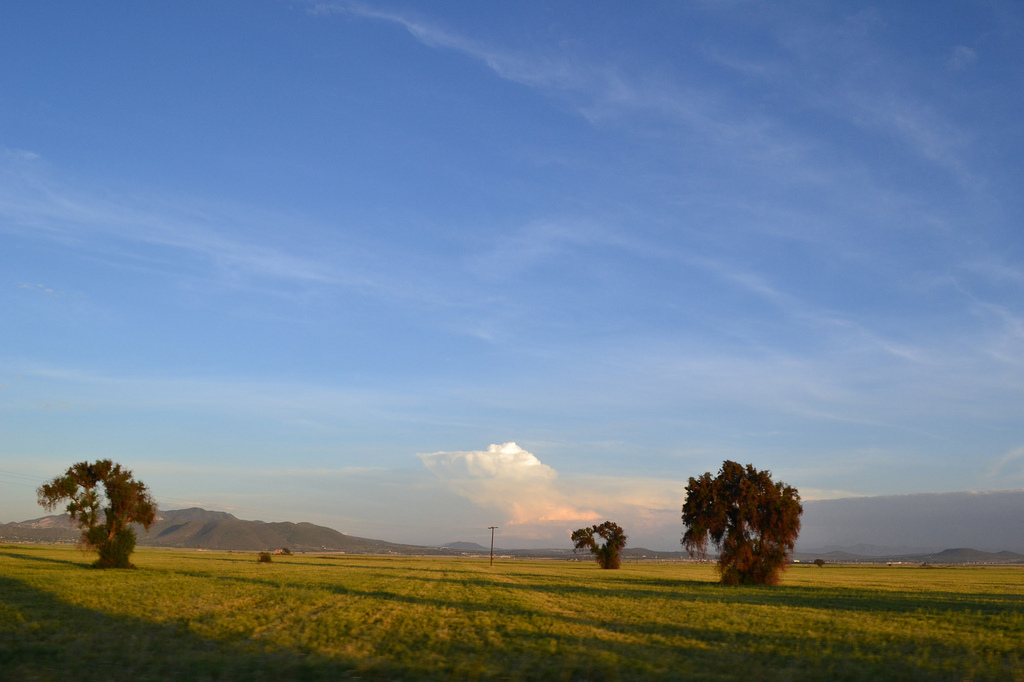
Pachuca-Tizayuca Valley, where the Tizayuca Dairy Basin is located.

In terms of processing agricultural and livestock products, there are 3,518 establishments dedicated to it. The municipalities with the highest amount are Pachuca, Ixmiquilpan, Actopan, and Tula, which together represent 29.8% of the total.

The products that make up the food industry sector in the state are coffee, malt, honey, jams, sauces, carbonated beverages and carbonated water, products for bread production and food additives, sausages, fryings and milk and their derivatives such as: cheese, heavy cream, yogurt and ice cream among others.

The Tizayuca Dairy Basin, created in 1976, has the Tizayuca Agroindustrial Complex (Caitsa) and occupies 120 hectares of land, in which 126 stables and 25,000 cows are located. 90 producers are working there, generating 2300 direct jobs and 7500 indirect jobs, and a combined production of 500,000 liters of milk. In the 1990s, the ranchers created their own production and marketing company under the name of Leche Real de Tizayuca, but in 2009, it went bankrupt. In 1976, the dairy basin produced 2.8 million liters per week, in 2008 its production was around 1.4 million per week, and in 2010 the production is around 500,000 liters per week. In 2012, the 70 active stables sold their product to firms such as: Santa Clara, Alpura, and Liconsa.

The Santa Clara Productos Lácteos company was founded in Pachuca in 1924 with just a small herd of 17 Creole cows, and in 2012 it was classified among the top 5 Mexican dairy groups, manufacturer of milk, yogurt, cream, ice cream, cheese and coffee. It processes more than 200,000 liters of milk per day, of which 75% is used for milk and the remaining 25% is used for the production of ice cream, yogurt and cheese. In Tizayuca, there is a plant of the company Fritos Totis.

==== Manufacturing ====
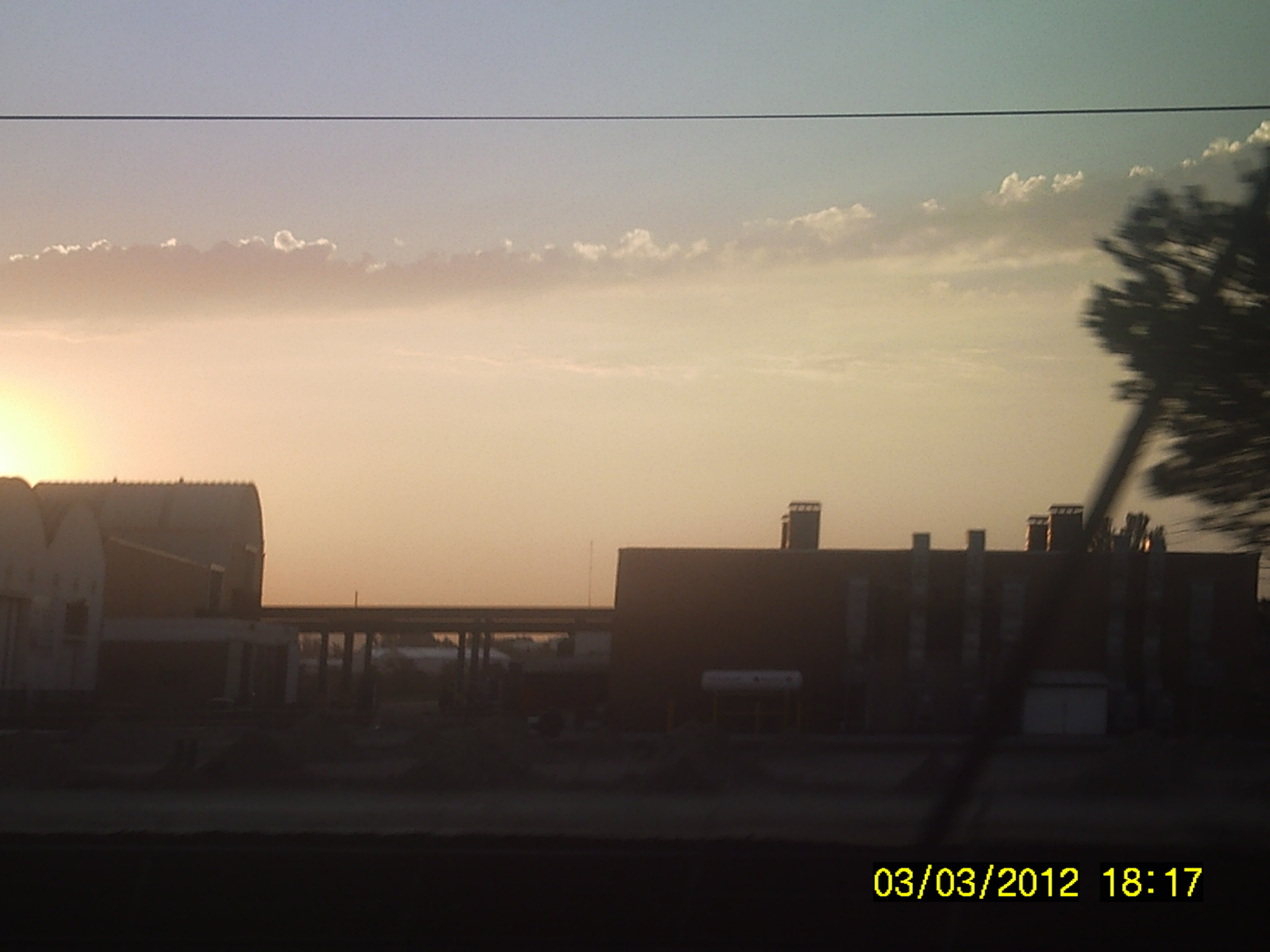
YSD Doors industrial plant, which is part of the industrial zone of Ciudad Sahagún.

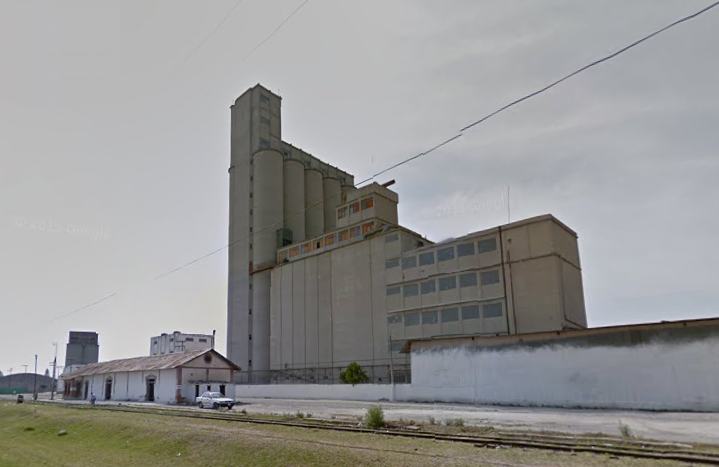
El Molino San Pedro in Tlaxcoapan.

Manufacturing industries in Hidalgo contribute to 28.84% of Hidalgo's GDP. In the area of productive infrastructure, the state has thirteen industrial and/or technological parks operating, located in Pachuca de Soto, Mineral de la Reforma, Tula de Allende, Tizayuca, Huejutla de Reyes, Atitalaquia and Ciudad Sahagún.

The municipalities with the highest levels of production of textile inputs and finishes, textile products and clothing are Tepeji del Río de Ocampo, Tizayuca, Tlaxcoapan, Zapotlán, Tlanalapa, Tepeapulco, Pachuca de Soto, Mineral de la Reforma, Progreso de Obregón, Actopan, Cuautepec de Hinojosa and Tulancingo de Bravo.

In 1952, the industrial zone of Ciudad Sahagún was created. It was considered the most important industrial center in Mexico, and the area had about 40,000 workers. In 1986 a cycle of 36 years of industrial heyday came to an end, in which the companies Constructora Nacional de Carros de Ferrocarril (CNCF), Diesel Nacional S.A. (Dina), Dikona (Dina-Komatsu) and National Steelworks (Sidena), closed. In 2008, there were three major companies located in the industrial corridor of Ciudad Sahagún: the U.S. transnational ASF-Keystone, the Canadian Bombardier-Concarril, and the Japanese Komatsu Mexicana, which reached 3,200 jobs between them. There are 17 medium-sized companies, divided into metalworking, automotive and railway; there are Aceros Corsa, Aerospace, American Coach, CAPDTIMM, CAPROME, CIMMATH, Dina-Camiones, Ferro Partes Mexicanas, Giant Motors, Global Transporte, Grupo Bler, Gunderson-Concarril, Kapton, Maquinados Teysa, MET-MET, SYCSA, Té Laggs and Timsa. In addition, there are 40 micro-enterprises, including the maquilado, embroidery, dairy products and profiling of metalworking parts, associated in the corporation called Industriales de Sahagún, AC (ISAC). Industries in the area account for almost 11,800 established jobs.

==== Petroleum industry ====
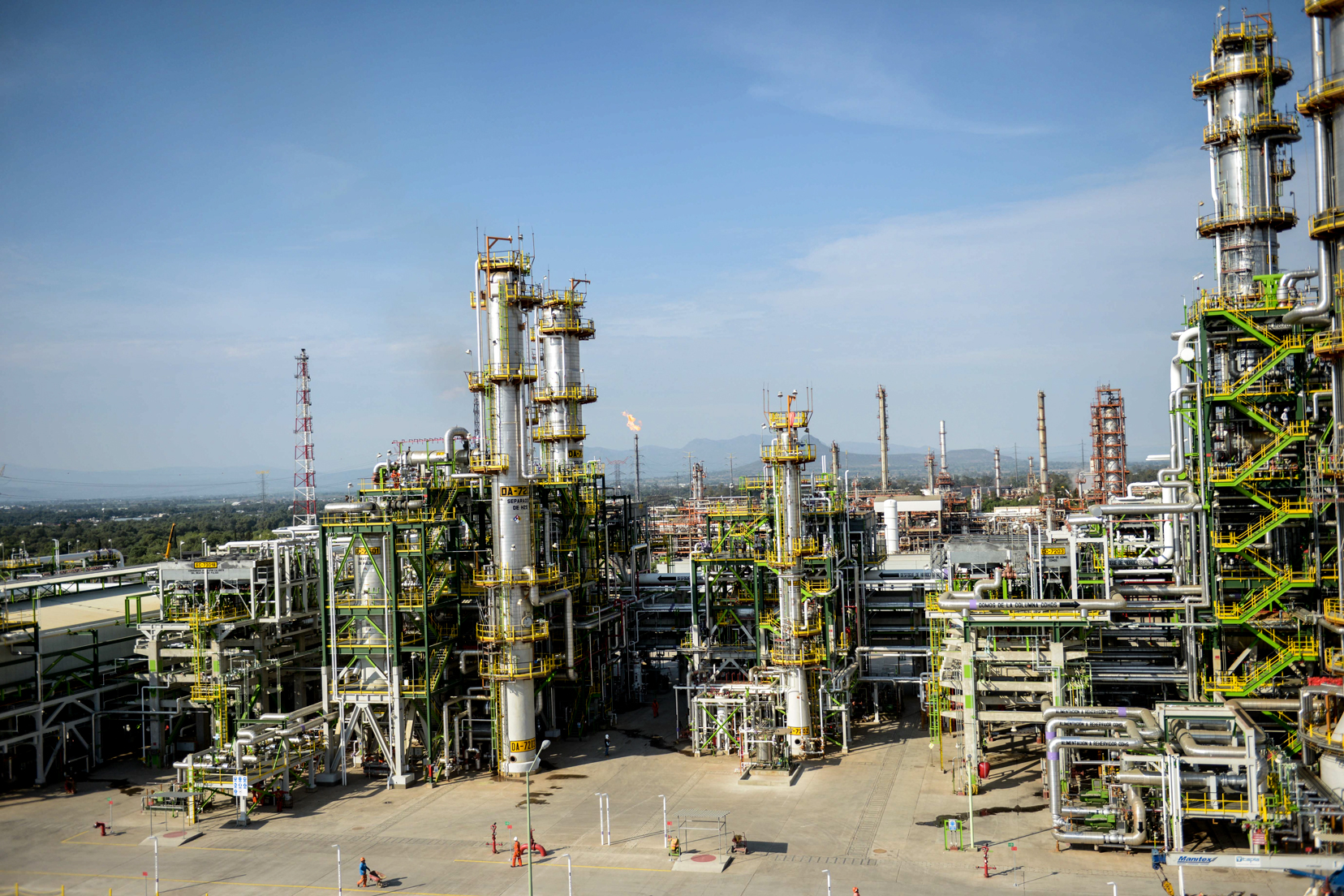
Panoramic view of the Miguel Hidalgo Refinery in Tula de Allende.

As for the oil industry, there is the "Miguel Hidalgo" refinery in Tula de Allende, its facilities occupy a total area of 749 hectares; It was the first refinery to be fully planned with high-capacity hydrocarbon processing plants. Its construction was carried out in several stages, the first stage being inaugurated on March 18, 1976.

This refinery is considered one of the most important in the country due to its installed capacity, and the share of the market it controls, since it processes 24% of the total crude oil that is refined in Mexico. The average production volume of refined products was 127,821,900 barrels, of which 40.1% corresponded to gasoline; 28.5% to fuel oil; 19.3% to diesel; 6.3% to kerosene and the remainder to liquefied gas, industrial fuel and asphalts. In addition, three important gas pipelines pass through the state (Poza Rica-Venta de Carpio, Zempoala-Salamanca and Tabasco-Salamanca).

The petrochemical industry produced 263 974 tonnes in 1998; Of these, 15.9% corresponded to sulphur, 20.2% to acrylonitrile, 36.9 % to propylene, 24.3% to carbon black, and the rest to hydrocyanic acid and acetonitrile.

==== Construction ====
The construction industry participated in 1997 with 3.61% of Hidalgo's GDP; This percentage is slightly lower than the national average of 4.6%). In 1998, the value of production in the construction industry amounted to 298.6 million pesos, of which 77.2% was public works and 22.8% private works. Of this amount, 29.5% corresponded to buildings, 25.3% to transport, 16.1% to oil and petrochemicals, 12.7% to other constructions, 10% to electricity and communications and 6.4% to water, irrigation and sanitation. There are 146 construction companies in the state: 127 are micro, 8 small, 4 medium, and 7 large, employing 2054 employees and workers.

The Cementera Cruz Azul is a Mexican company in the construction industry. It has four plants, one of which is located in the Cruz Azul Cooperative City, the city was born with the installation of a cement factory at the end of the 19th century, installed in what was the former Hacienda de Jasso, in the southwest of the state within the municipality of Tula de Allende.

The cement industry is made up of four large companies: Cementos Mexicanos, Cruz Azul, Portland Blanco de México, and Apasco, whose growth has been significant in recent years, generating a significant economic spillover in the state. The Cementera Santa Anita crusher and materials processing plant has about 372 hectares in the Mezquital Valley; This plant generated around 1,200 jobs during its construction; Already in operation, it represents no less than 900 direct and indirect jobs.

==== Energy ====
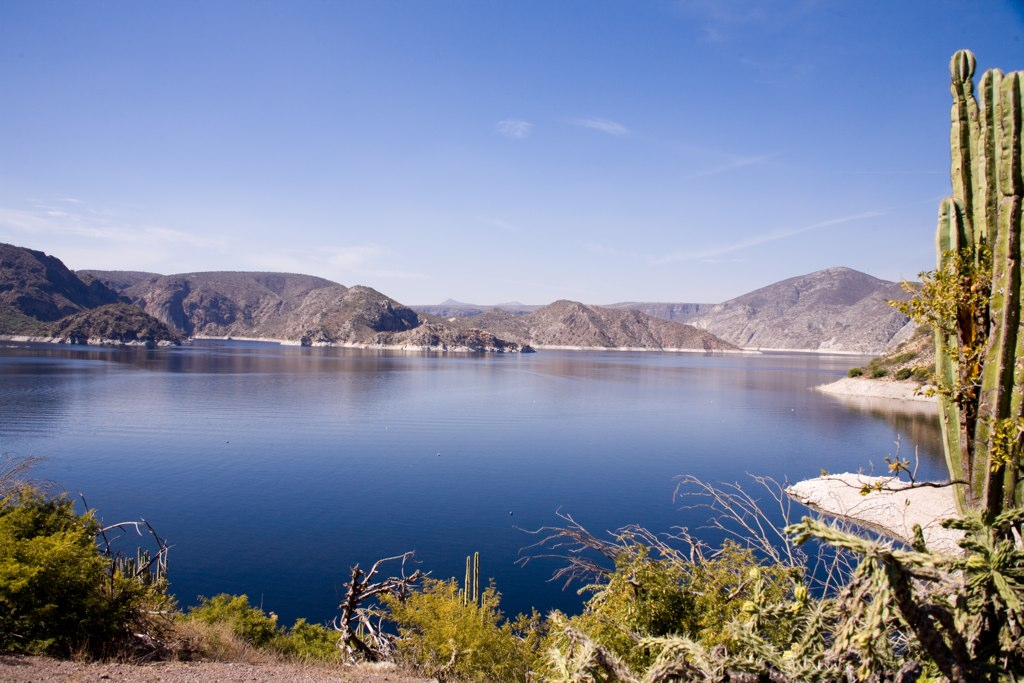
Reservoir formed by the Zimapán Dam.

In electricity, this sector accounted for 3.87% of the state's GDP in 1997, higher than the national average (1.2%), and 4.3% of the national electricity GDP. In the same year, Hidalgo accounted for 8.7% of the total electricity generated in the country. Of the energy generated, 91.5% comes from thermoelectric plants. The value of sales was 996.2 million pesos. In terms of the degree of electrification of the State, in 1998 a total of 1405 localities were served, with 469,028 electrical outlets.

In terms of power generation, the state is self-sufficient as it has electricity generating plants in different municipalities, the state generates 9.4% of the country's electrical energy with 2900 megawatts (MW). The Fernando Hiriart Balderrama Dam, located in the riverbed that joins the rivers Tula and Moctezuma at Zimapán was launched on September 27, 1996. The curtain has a height of 203 meters from the floor to the crown and has a hydroelectric power plant capable of generating 292 megawatts of electricity.

=== Tertiary activities ===
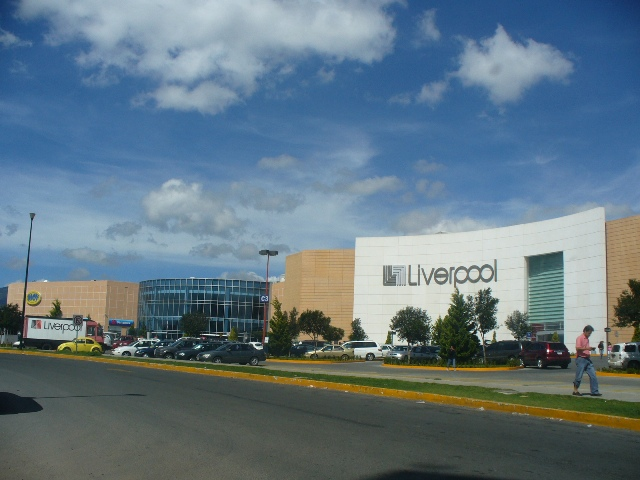
Shopping Center Galerías Pachuca.

Market in Santiago Tulantepec.

==== Trade ====
Commerce in the state has been stable in recent years; being the second sector with the highest contribution to the state's GDP. Hidalgo has seven supply centers, 60 markets, and 211 tianguis. 54% of the municipalities do not have a public market and the inhabitants of these municipalities are supplied through tianguis that are set up at least once a week.

As for commercial branches, the most important, in terms of the personnel it employs, is that of retail food products, which includes groceries, butchers, poultry shops and others. Secondly, there are pharmacies, haberdashery, shoe stores, and clothing stores, among others.

Thirdly, according to its importance, is the wholesale food trade, where we find establishments distributing fruits, eggs, groceries, beverages, and others. Trade is concentrated in the main urban centers such as Pachuca de Soto, Tulancingo de Bravo, Actopan, Huejutla de Reyes and Tula de Allende. Hidalgo's foreign trade went from a deficit in 2000 to 2004 to a surplus from 2005 to 2009. The main export products during the period from January to December 2009 were vehicles and railway equipment, cotton, clothing and accessories, rubber and its derivatives, machinery, apparatus, and mechanical devices.

During 2014 in Hidalgo, the value of exports reached an amount of 1721.6 million pesos, which represented 0.5% at the national level. The manufacturing industry stood out as the main activity with an export value of 1,719.1 million pesos. The subsectors with the highest participation were: petroleum and coal products (40.1%) and transport equipment (34.4%). With respect to remittances, it reached a total of 725.2 million pesos during the period January–December 2015.

==== Tourism ====
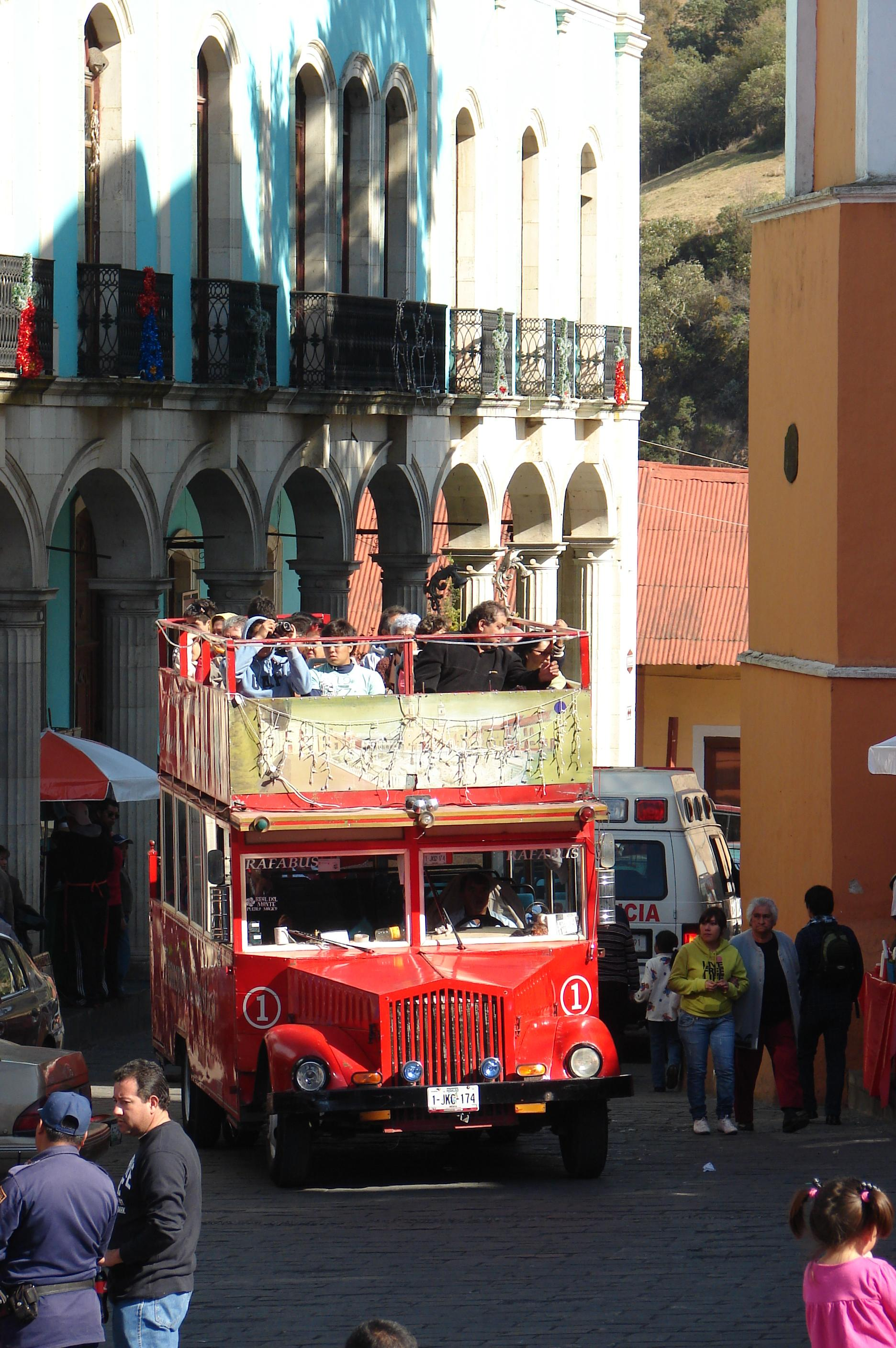
Turibus in Real del Monte; other cities that have this service are Actopan and Pachuca.

The state of Hidalgo can be consolidated as an important tourist destination in Mexico, representing 1.6% of the national tourism offer. It also offers a wide market of tourist services, 567 hotels, 598 restaurants, 102 spas, 93 bars, 22 nightclubs, 74 travel agencies, 5 hunting ranches, 39 rental and transport companies and five golf courses.

The State of Hidalgo is divided into six tourist corridors: the Spa Corridor, the Mountain Corridor, the Four Elements Corridor, the Toltec Corridor, the Hacienda Corridor and the Sierra-Huasteca Corridor, which represent differentiated levels of development and tourism products.

Tourist destinations are visited annually by an average of 1,800,000 tourists. In 2010 alone, 310,322 tourists arrived in Pachuca, of which 86% (276,351) were residents of the country. At the state level, 1,063,757 tourists arrived at lodging establishments, with a percentage of 94% of national origin. The Hidalgo Fair receives an average of 750 to 850 thousand visitors per edition.

===== Spa Corridor =====
Within the Mezquital Valley is one of the most representative areas of the Otomi region. Located at more than 1500 m s. n. m., enjoys a mild climate suitable for tourism..

The Spa Corridor is characterized by spas of thermal waters, which spring at average temperatures of 38 °C, since the geographical location places it On the Transversal Neovolcanic Axis and therefore beneath the earth there are cracks and magma rivers that heat the aquifers and enrich them with minerals, sulfates, carbons and nitrates; This corridor passes through the municipalities of El Arenal, Cardonal, Actopan, Santiago de Anaya, Ixmiquilpan, Tasquillo, Tecozautla and Huichapan.

===== Mountain Corridor =====
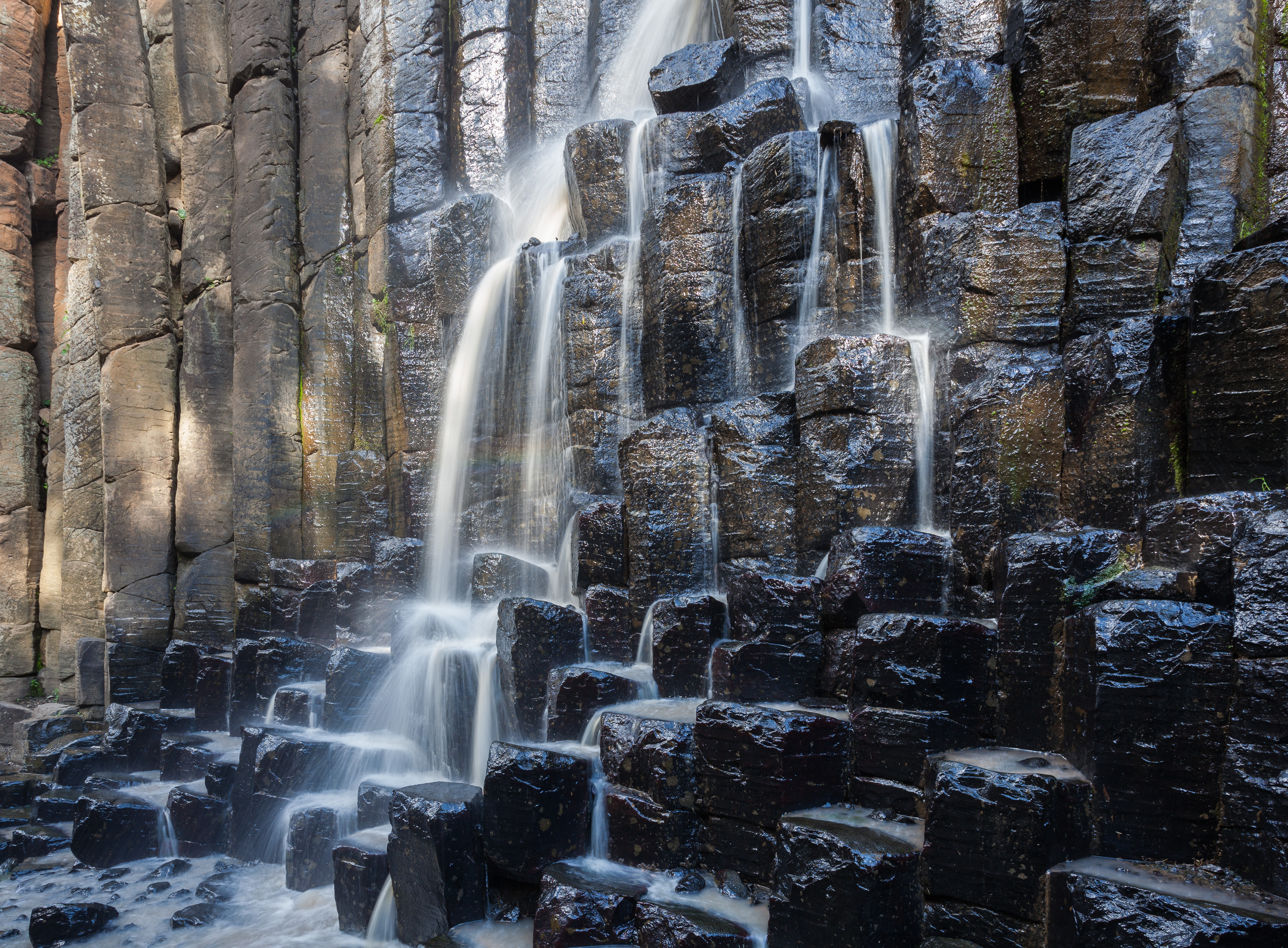
Basaltic Prisms of Santa María Regla.

The name of the corridor is derived from the geographical area it occupies within the state of Hidalgo, due to the natural characteristics of each municipality that integrates it. The Mountain Corridor is visited for its attractive ecotourism, where you can practice sports such as rappelling, mountaineering, canoeing, sport fishing and paragliding.

There are interesting examples of historical monuments, both civil and religious, as well as their mining haciendas of the 17th century, built by Pedro Romero de Terreros, the Count of Regla. It has the mining towns of Huasca de Ocampo, Real del Monte and Mineral del Chico, which are part of the program called Magical Towns.

===== Corridor of the 4 Elements =====
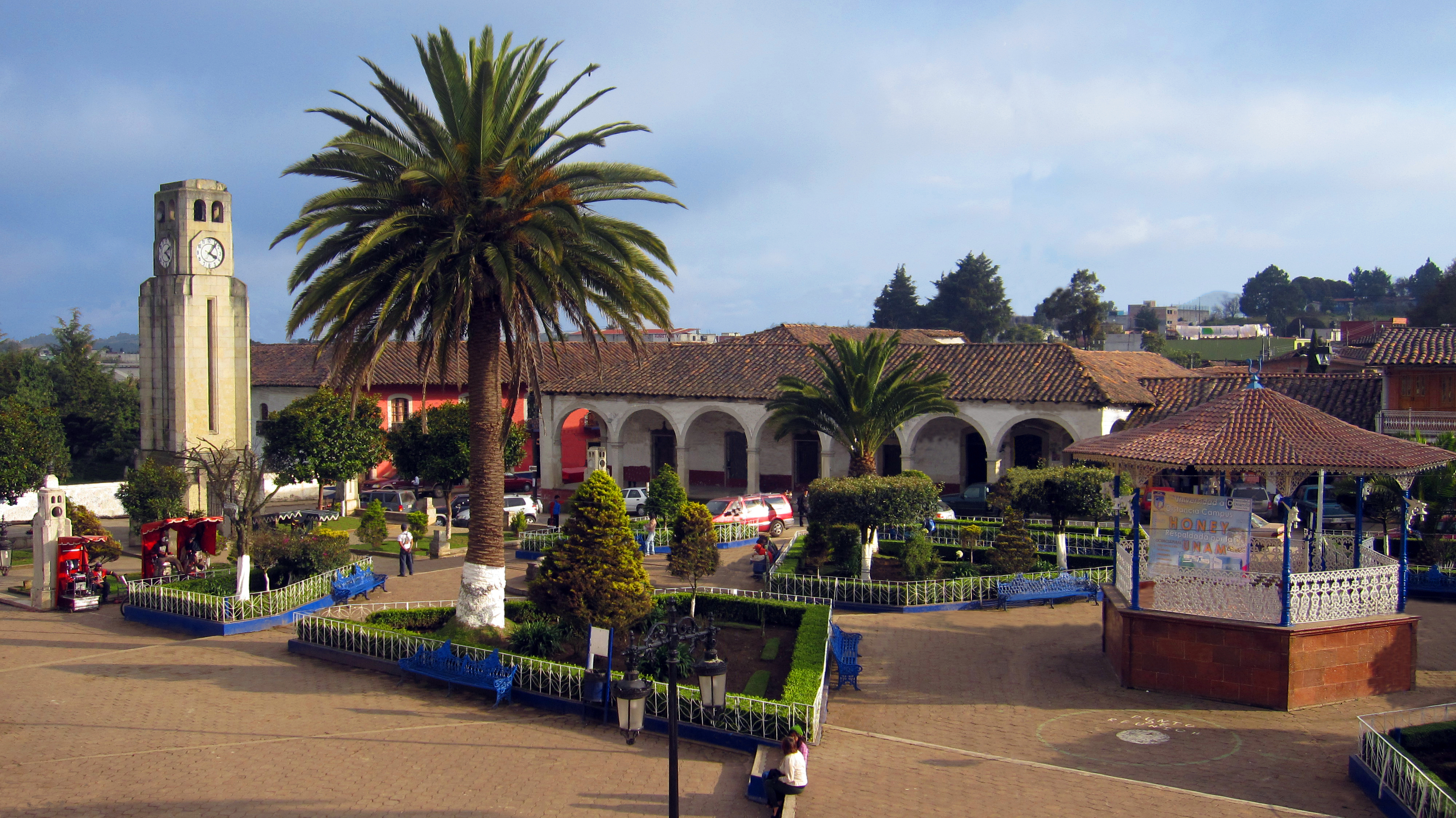
Monumental Clock of Acaxochitlán.

The route is named after the four elements represented along the corridor: Air, which allows you to live the experience of flying in a hot air balloon; Water, which presents itself in the immense waterfalls and lagoons where activities such as sport fishing and boat riding can be enjoyed recreationally; Fire, Which is shown through the manufacture of cast iron products in the Apulco factory; and Land, which is characterized by scenic expanses and beautiful landscapes. the Corridor also features places that serve exotic foods such as deer, crocodile and ostrich, which stand out. It is made up of the municipalities of Tulancingo, Acaxochitlán, Metepec, Tenango de Doria and San Bartolo Tutotepec.

===== Toltec Corridor =====
The Toltec Corridor because of the geographical area it occupies within the state, the Toltec culture, is characterized by the municipalities of Mixquiahuala, Tlahuelilpan, Atotonilco de Tula, Tula de Allende and Tepeji del Río.

This corridor is characterized by the diversity of tourist attractions, history, and tradition that exist in each of its municipalities. Attractions in the Toltec Corridor include the Mesoamerican archaeological zone of Tula, historic 16th century convents, and hot springs.

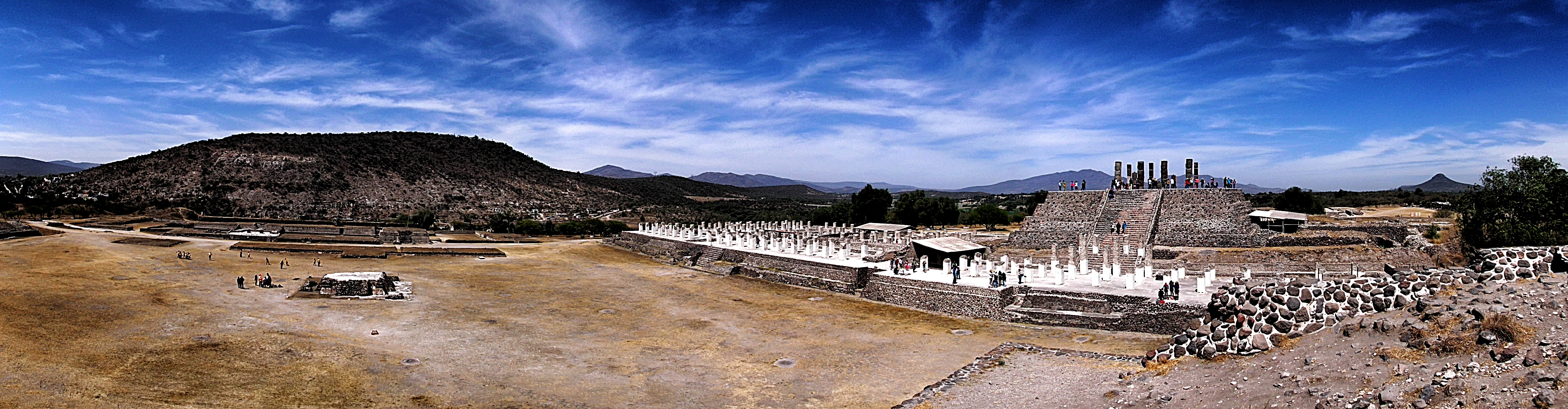
Panoramic view of Tollan-Xicocotitlan.

===== Corridor of the Haciendas =====
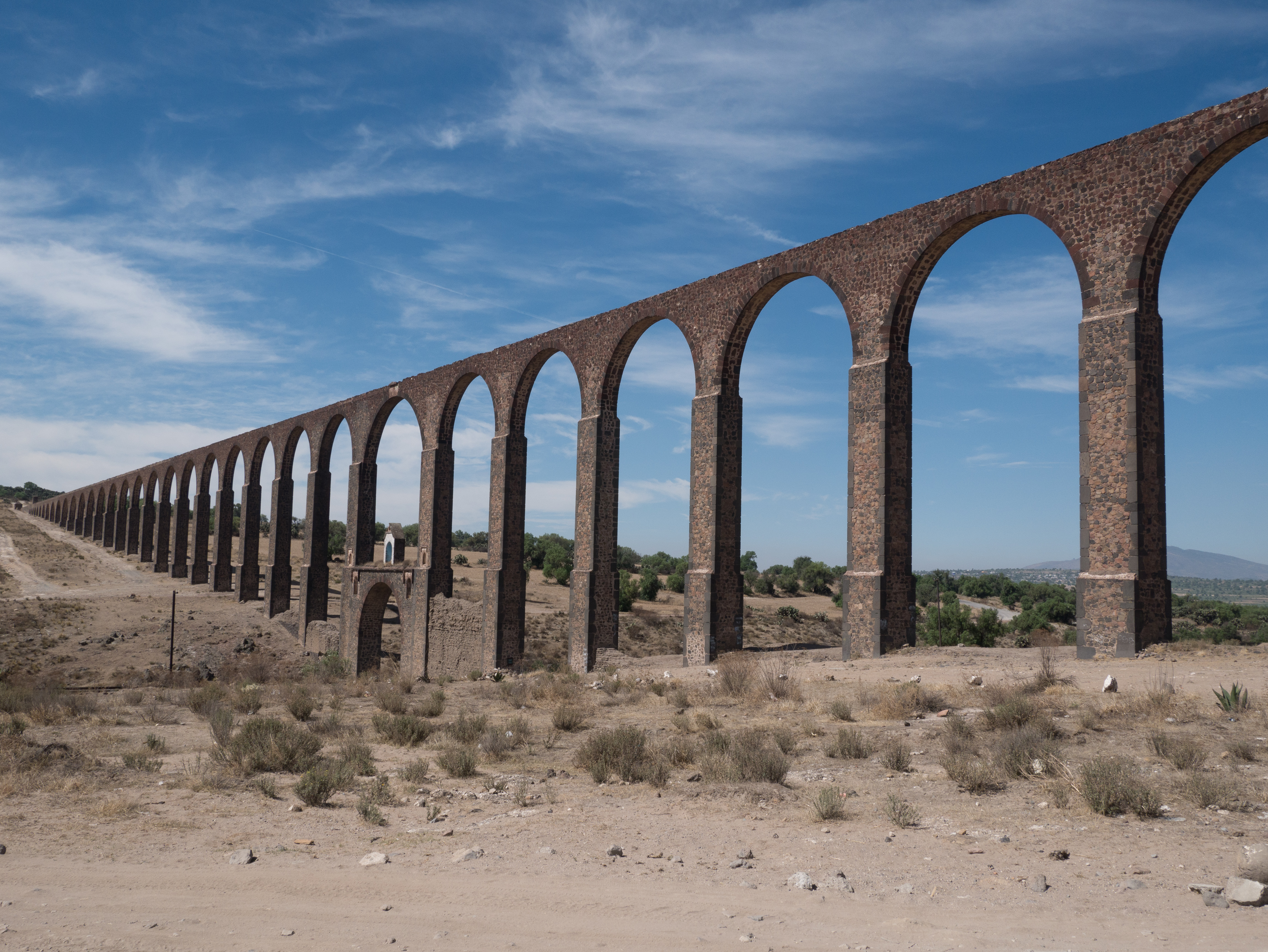
Aqueduct of Padre Tembleque.

The Corridor of the Haciendas, on this route there are the centers of haciendas that were built during the 16th century, 17th century, 18th century and 19th century, is made up of municipalities of Zempoala, Tepeapulco and Apan. This corridor is made up of municipalities in which you can visit from typical villages that preserve their roots, to the area of the altiplanicie pulquera, where it is advisable to visit the haciendas dedicated to the production of pulque, as well as some of the religious complexes, an archaeological zone, and civil constructions such as the Aqueduct of Padre Tembleque.

===== Corridor of the Sierra and the Huasteca =====
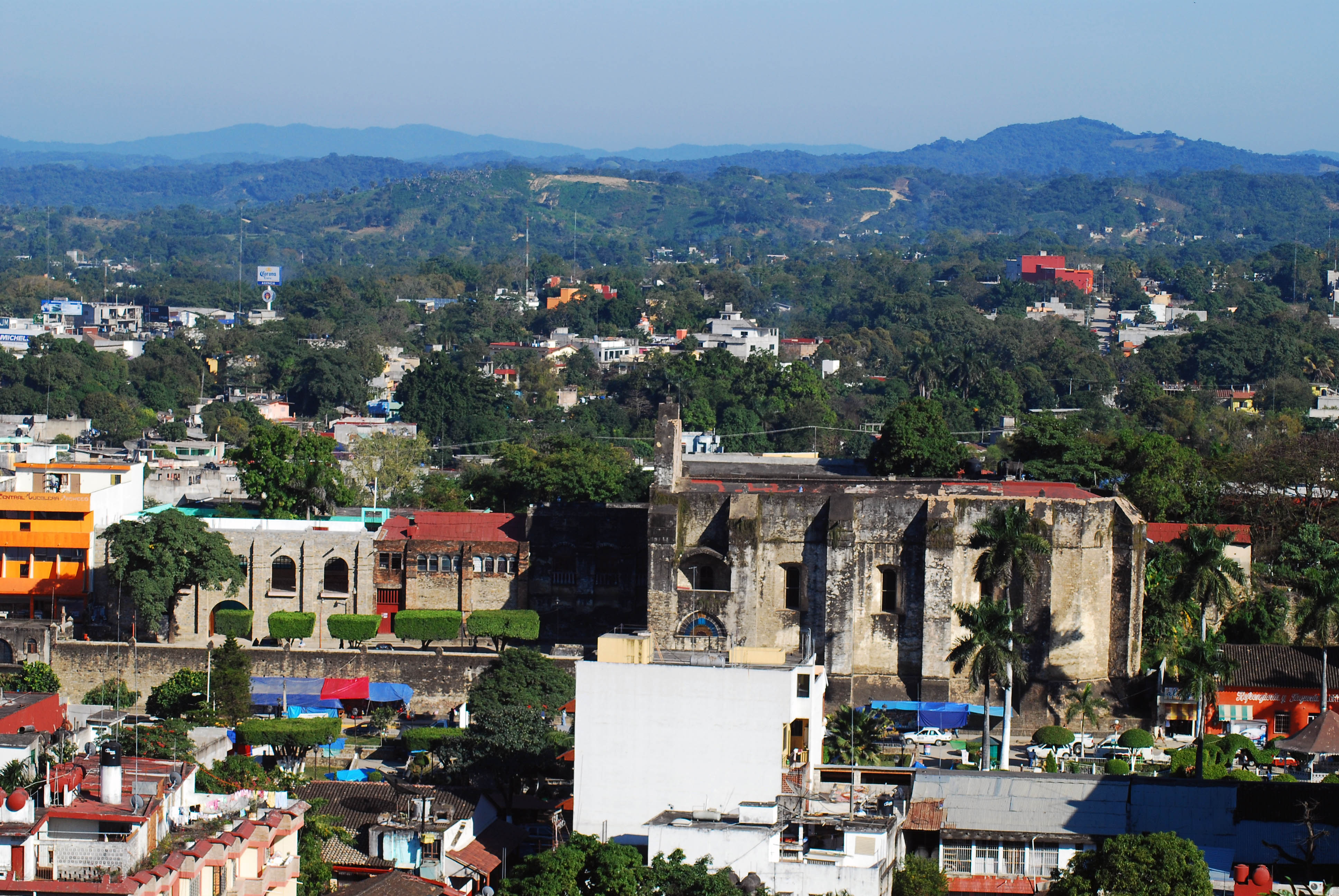
Huejutla de Reyes

===== Urban corridor of Pachuca and its surroundings =====
Pachuca is the most important city in the state. The municipality's tourism infrastructure is as follows: 32 lodging establishments with a capacity of 1,471 rooms, 157 beverage and food preparation establishments, 36 travel agencies, 13 car rental companies, 4 convention centers, and 1 golf course.

The main tourist attractions of the city are the buildings, monuments, and museums of the historic center, as well as the various cultural centers in the other parts of the city, highlighting the David Ben Gurion Park. The Hidalgo Stadium is a major tourist attraction, especially during the matches of the Primera División of Mexican Soccer. In the city there is a Turibús called the Tranvía Turístico de Pachuca, installed in 2003 that runs through the main attractions of the city center.

The Calinda Hotel which was established in 1987 and is now Fiesta Inn, later the Hotel Excelencia Plaza in 1992, Hotel La Joya in 1993, the Camino Real Hotel in charge of the Angeles Business Group (formerly Crowne Plaza Hotel) which was established in 2005; and the Holiday Inn Hotel are a sample of the hotels in the city. One of the most requested products by tourists is pasta.

== See also ==
- Economy of Mexico
