= Almoloya =

Almoloya is a Mexican toponym from the Nahuatl atl (water) and molonhi (spring). It may refer to:

- Estado de México:
  - Almoloya de Juárez, site of a federal maximum security prison
  - Almoloya de Alquisiras
  - Almoloya de las Granadas
  - Almoloya del Río
- Hidalgo:
  - Almoloya, Hidalgo
