= Paola Monroy =

Mexican footballer (born 1996)

Personal information
- Full name: Diana Paola Monroy Cabrera
- Date of birth: 29 August 1996 (age 30)
- Place of birth: Tepeapulco, Hidalgo, Mexico
- Height: 1.72 m (5 ft 8 in)
- Position: Centre-back

Senior career*
Years	Team	Apps	(Gls)
2017–2021	Pachuca	75	(2)
2022	Monterrey	7	(0)
2023–2025	Toluca	51	(1)
- * Club domestic league appearances and goals as of 4 June 2023

Diana Paola Monroy Cabrera (born 29 August 1996) is a Mexican professional footballer who plays as a Left-back.

== Career ==
In 2017, she started her career in Pachuca. In 2022, she was transferred to Monterrey. In 2023, she joined to Toluca.
