= Apa y Tepeapulco =

Administrative division of New Spain

Apa y Tepeapulco was a Spanish corregimiento during the colonial period in New Spain (what is today Mexico). It was located in south-eastern Hidalgo consisting of the modern municipalities of Almoloya, Tepeapulco and at least some of Tlanalapa.

The region was a frontier province of the Aztec Empire. Tepepolco was also part of this province, and it was a point of resistance to Tlaxcallan invasions. It may have had a connection with Huehue-ichocayan.

In 1527 the Franciscans established a parish at Tepeapulco.

The population was primarily Nahuatl- and Otomi-speaking prior to the Spanish incursion. By 1521 the Spanish power had been asserted over this area. It was made its own corrigimento in 1531. For a brief time around 1545 Tlanalapa was a separate unit but was reunited with Apa y Tepeapulco shortly later.

In 1787 when the government of New Spain was reorganized Apa y Tepeapulco was made a subdelegacion retaining its old boundaries.

In 1792 the population consisted of 1,295 Spaniard (both peninsulares and creoles), 651 mestizos, 1,059 mulattos and at least 5,000 indios.

== Sources ==
- Gerhard, Peter. Guide to the Historical Geography of New Spain. Cambridge: Cambridge University Press, 1972.
