= Centro de Investigaciones Cientifícas de las Huastecas 'Aguazarca' =

Mexican research station

Centro de Investigaciones Científicas de las Huastecas 'Aguazarca' (CICHAZ) is a research station in Calnali, Hidalgo, Mexico, located at an elevation of 986 m on the eastern slope of the Sierra Madre Oriental. Founded in 2005, CICHAZ is privately owned and a member of the Organization of Biological Field Stations. CICHAZ has hosted researchers from Texas A&M University, Yale University, UNAM, UAEH, CIBNOR, the University of Oklahoma, the University of Texas at Austin, Harvard University, the University of Zurich and the University of Navarra. Social-science research focuses on local government and local and national educational policy. Natural science work involves the ecology of freshwater systems in the local Veracruz moist forests, and the evolutionary biology of hybrid zones between the poeciliid fish Xiphophorus birchmanni and X. malinche.
