= Calnali =

- Town and municipality
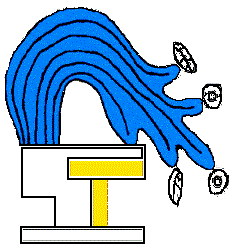
- Coat of arms

- Location within Hidalgo Location within Mexico
- Coordinates: 20°54′N 98°35′W
- Country: Mexico
- State: Hidalgo
- Municipality: Calnali
- Founded: 1730

Government
  - Type: Partido Encuentro Social
  - Mayor: Miguel Jimenez Espinoza
  - Federal electoral district: Hidalgo's 1st

Area
  - Total: 190.2 km^{2} (73.4 sq mi)

Population (2015)
  - Total: 17 163
- Time zone: UTC-6 (Central)
- Website: https://calnali.gob.mx/

Calnali is a town and one of the 84 municipalities of Hidalgo, in central-eastern Mexico. The municipality covers an area of 190.2 km^{2} (73.4 sq mi). Calnali is a Nahuatl name meaning house on the other side of the river. As of 2005, the municipality had a total population of 15,815.

The cabecera or municipal seat is primarily mestizo, while the outlying communities (including Papatlatla, Tula, Atempa, and Ahuacatlan) are heavily populated by Nahuatl-speaking indigenous people. The town's tianguis is held every Sunday morning in the central plaza and surrounding streets. Despite its small size, Calnali is important as a regional cultural center, hosting an annual music festival featuring local Bandas de Viento and huapango performers, as well as an annual festival of indigenous culture. Large celebrations are also held for the Day of the Dead, Carnival and 25 April which is the festival of Calnali's patron saint, San Marcos.

In the 2008 municipal elections, Calnali became the first and only municipality in Hidalgo to be governed by the progressive Convergencia party. In 2009, over the objections of the municipal administration, the Diocese of Huejutla temporarily suspended all Catholic Church functions in Calnali, including baptisms and funerals, in response to indigenous carnival activities on Ash Wednesday. The municipal government reverted to the Partido Revolucionario Institucional in 2011.

Calnali supports six hotels, including three rustic eco-tourism lodges. The Centro de Investigaciones Cientifícas de las Huastecas 'Aguazarca' (CICHAZ) is located on the western outskirts of the municipal seat.

Central Calnali is located at 980 m elevation, and the entire municipality occupies the eastern slope of the Sierra Madre Oriental. The terrain is largely mountainous Veracruz moist forests fragmented by pasture and cropland. The Río Calnali and the Río Tula/Atempa, tributaries of the Río Conzintla and ultimately the Río Pánuco, traverse the municipality from west to east. Each of these rivers is a hybrid zone between two species of the swordtail fish Xiphophorus.

== Gallery ==
Cerro de la Aguja, Needle Mountain Guardian of Calnali

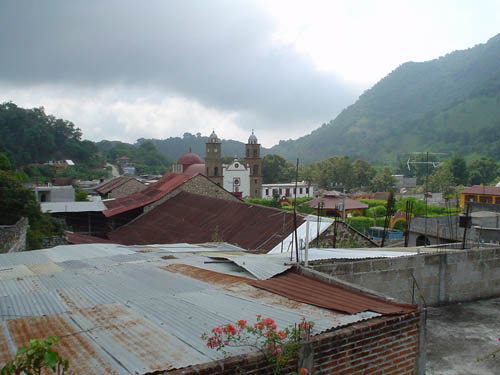
Downtown Calnali in 1998

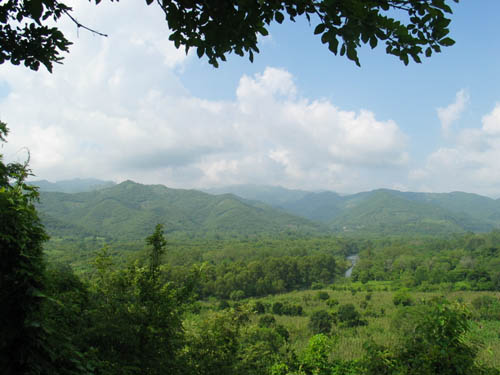
Valley of the Río Tula, Calnali, facing west from Papatlatla

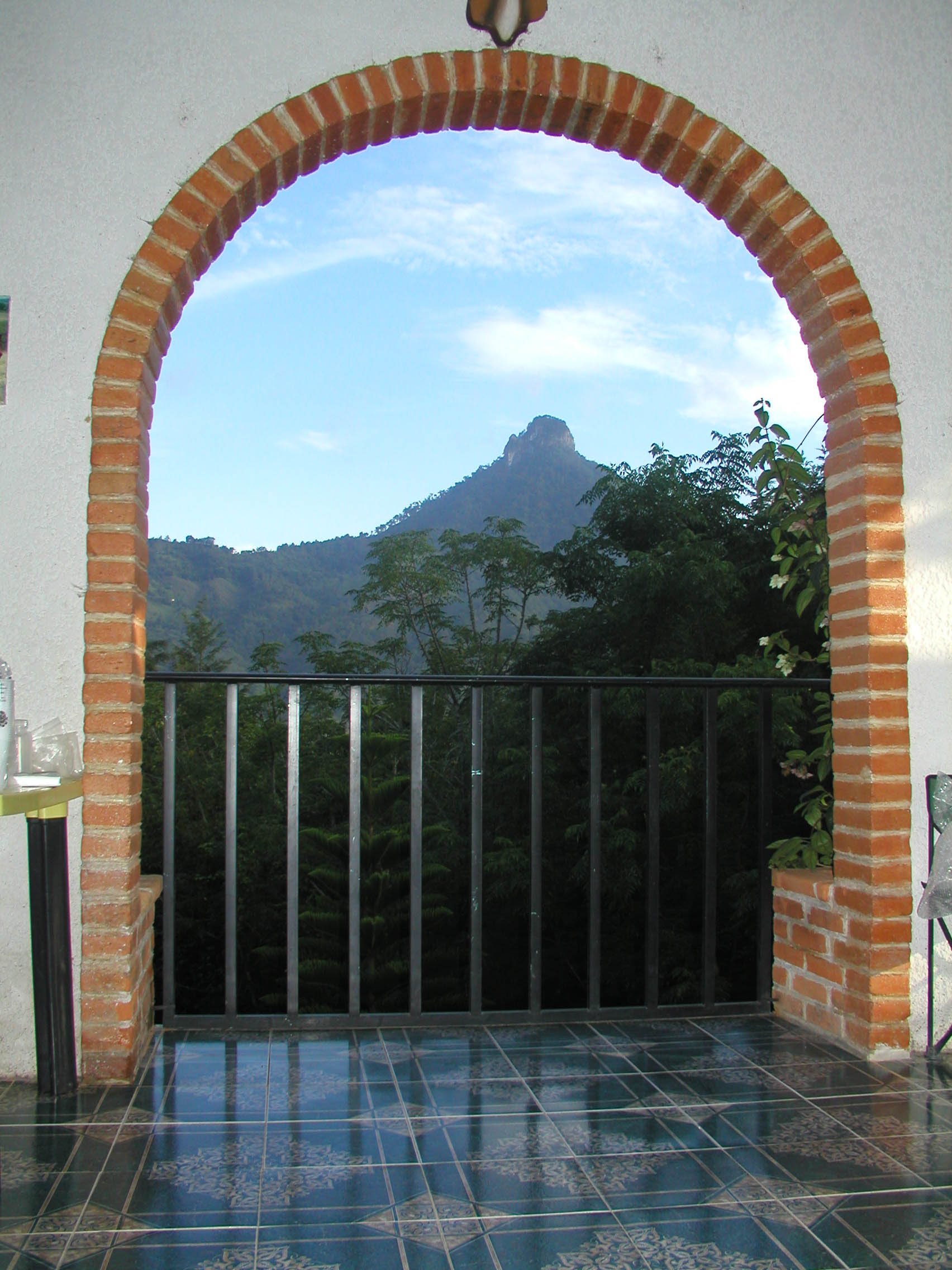
View of Cerro de la Aguja (Needle Mountain) from Rancho Ahuimol, Calnali

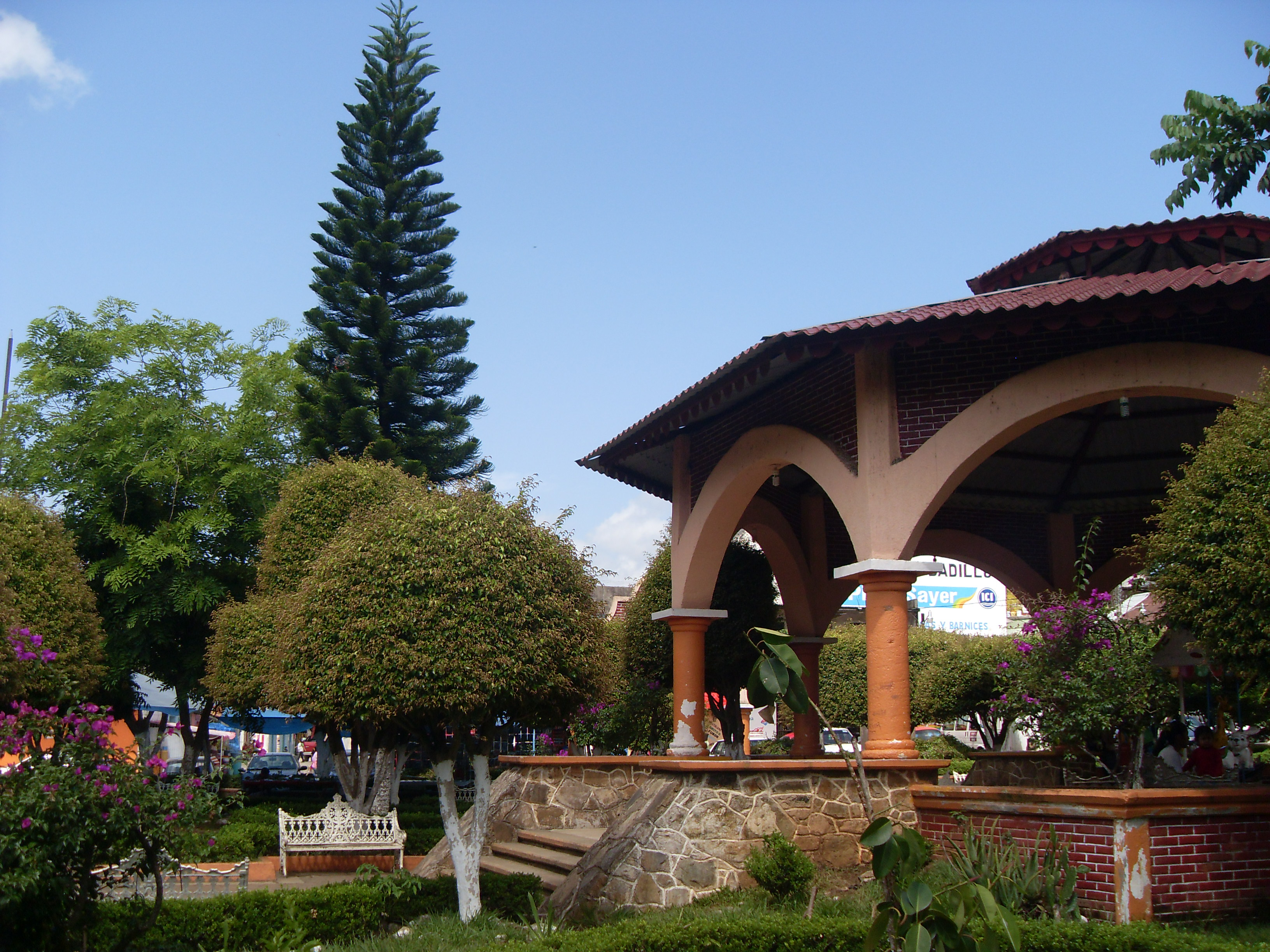
Plaza Calnali in 2009

One of Calnali's historical bridges

Quinta la Palapa, Calnali's Eco-Tourism Lodge

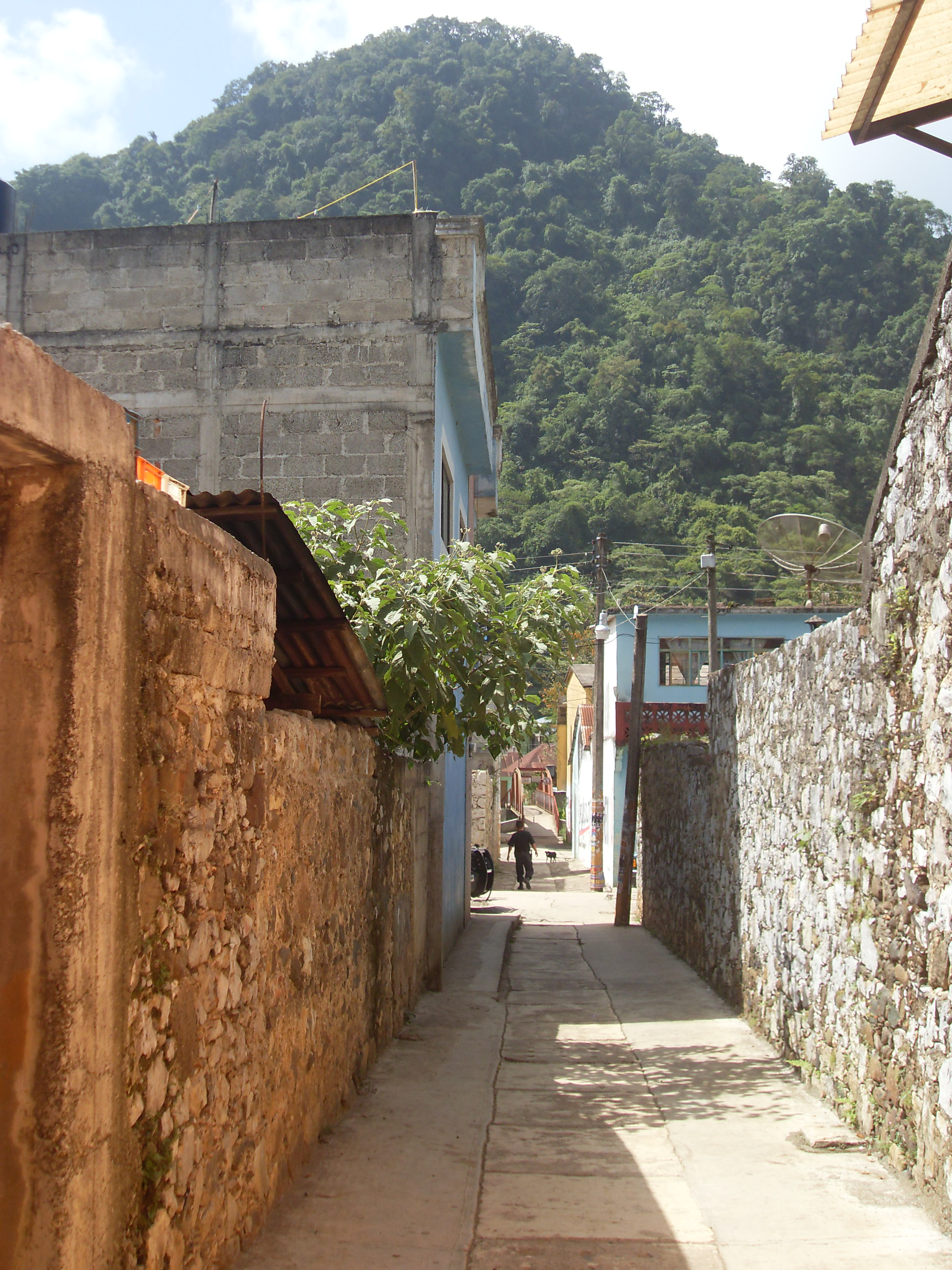
View of the Serpent Mountain from an alley in downtown Calnali
