= Ciudad Sahagún =

Ciudad Sahagún, Hidalgo
- Town and industrial city
- Fray Bernardino de Sahagún
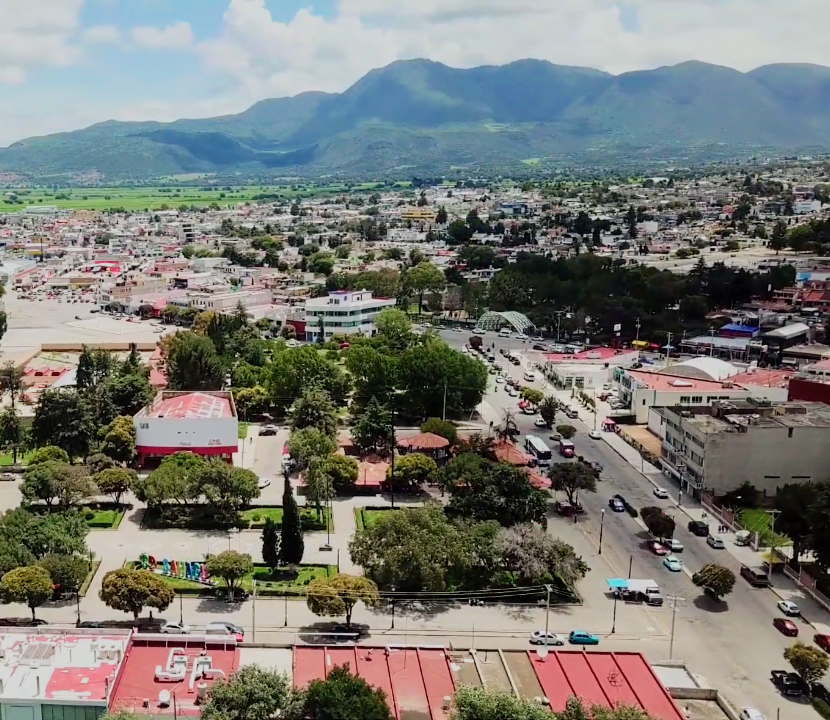

- Location within Hidalgo Location within Mexico
- Coordinates (Town): 19°46′17″N 98°34′49″W
- Country: Mexico
- State: Hidalgo
- Municipality: Tepeapulco
- First factories: 1951
- Official ignauguration: 1952
- Incorporation to municipality of Tepeapulco: 1971
- Named after: Bernardino de Sahagún
- Colonias: 38

Government (Note: The town has no self-government; the highest authority (as with all towns in Mexico) is the mayor of the municipality, in this case Tepeapulco.)
  - Type: Ayuntamiento
  - Mayor or President of municipality of Tepeapulco: Alberto Franco
  - Federal electoral district: Hidalgo's 7th
- Elevation: 2,450 m (8,040 ft)

Population (2010)
  - Total: 28,609
- Demonym: Sahagunense
- Time zone: UTC-6 (Zona Centro)
- Postal code: 43990
- Area code: 791
- Website: www.sahagun.tepeapulco.gob.mx

Ciudad Sahagún, officially called Fray Bernardino de Sahagún, is a town in the municipality of Tepeapulco, within the Mexican state of Hidalgo.

== History ==
=== Antecedents ===
In the early 1950s, by order of President Miguel Alemán Valdés, land in the municipality of Tepeapulco, Hidalgo, 95 kilometers north of Mexico City, was settled in what was intended as a national model: the industrial area of Ciudad Sahagún.

=== The first factories ===
On July 28, 1951, the Diesel Nacional company (DINA) was created, with a license agreement and technical advice from the Italian company Fiat. The share capital amounted to 75 million pesos, 78% of which represented state participation.

In 1952 work began on building the first vehicle of Constructora Nacional de Carros de Ferrocarril SA (Concarril), a rail vehicle manufacturer. At the same time a resolution was sought to the crisis in the textile industry and in 1954 the National Textile Machinery Factory "Toyoda of Mexico" was formed, which later became National Steel (Sidena), which established the three core anchor factory businesses in Ciudad Sahagún.

=== Housing units (colognes) ===
In parallel, a popular housing group of 1317 houses and 46 apartments, more shops, a market, sports fields, administrative offices and basic medical and educational services were built. Amenities such as paved streets, drainage, drinking water and electricity were introduced. In 1961 he joined 515 houses built by the IMSS.

=== Incorporation to the municipality of Tepeapulco ===
In 1971 Ciudad Sahagún was incorporated into the municipality of Tepeapulco.

=== Entrance to neoliberalism ===
After the arrival of different plants, several economic events (like the arrival of foreign brands in Mexico) forced the Renault plant to shut in 1986, with the loss of 7000 jobs.

At Sidena, in state hands, there were liquidity problems due to the looting of its coffers by managers, according to a study by the state government. In the late 1980s, Concarril was taken over by Bombardier, a Canadian equity firm and its transformation brought less paternalistic policies affecting unionized workers, who until then enjoyed privileges such as exemption from property taxes and utilities, which the company absorbed.

By 1993, National Steel filed for bankruptcy due to liquidity problems. In January 2002 Dina closed its last factory (DINA-Trucks). Earlier it had separated from DINA-Buses, acquired by Motor Coach Industries (MCI).

=== Restart ===
Since 2005 new businesses have arrived in the industrial area of Ciudad Sahagún, the result of several government attempts to restore the city's economy. Although it is generally considered that while Ciudad Sahagún may not return to its economic status of the past, it should have economic stability for a while.

== Economy ==
In 2008, Ciudad Sahagún housed 3 large companies, 17 medium-sized companies and 40 microenterprises, adding 60 companies and nearly 12,000 jobs, unlike 40.000 work places that had been made for nearly 36 years of tremendous progress. The Svenska Cellulosa Aktiebolaget (SCA), Praxair, Gerdau and The Greenbrier Companies are among companies that have recently arrived.

Bombardier split construction of 204 Flexity Outlook streetcars, for the Toronto Transit Commission, and 182 Flexity Freedom light rail vehicles for service in the Greater Toronto Area between its Ciudad Sahagún factory, and one of its factories in Thunder Bay, Ontario. Welding the basic chassis was to take place in the Ciudad Sahagún factory. Bombardier fell years behind in delivery of these vehicles. Reports in the Canadian press repeated claims that the workers in the Thunder Bay plant that the work done in Ciudad Sahagún was incompetent. Bombardier tried to accelerate construction by opening an additional production line at its plant in Kingston, Ontario.

== Festivities ==
- The September 15th Parade, the Mexican Independence Day (Cry of Dolores), where most of the local schools participate.
- The November 20th Parade takes place through the main streets of the city where schools focus on a single topic: the extracurricular activities of each campus. The students show their sports and cultural skills.
- The anniversary of the founding of the city, which is celebrated the second week of October. Cultural, artistic and sports events are held that entire week at Rodrigo Gómez Square (Downtown).
- The pilgrimage of December 12. The tradition is to form an allegorical float and walk around with images of the Virgin of Guadalupe through the main streets of the city until the main church is reached, located in front of Rodrigo Gómez Square. The allegorical floats are adorned with flowers and accompanied by music. At the end, each image of the virgin is placed in the church and the parish priest presides over a special mass. Once this is finished, people are invited to watch the fireworks show that takes place at Rodrigo Gómez Square.
- Hidalgo's Paper Globe Festival. This tradition began in 2008 and is celebrated on the second weekend of the month of December. This festival consists of making and releasing paper balloons.
- National Huapango Competition. This competition takes place during the fair.
