= Tlanalapa =

- Town and municipality
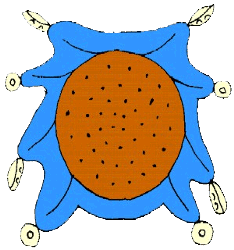
- Coat of arms

- Location within Hidalgo Location within Mexico
- Coordinates: 19°49′N 98°36′W
- Country: Mexico
- State: Hidalgo
- Municipality: Tlanalapa

Government
  - Federal electoral district: Hidalgo's 7th

Area
  - Total: 156.7 km^{2} (60.5 sq mi)

Population (2020)
  - Total: 8,062
- Time zone: UTC-6 (Zona Centro)
- Website: tlanalapa.gob.mx

Tlanalapa is a town and one of the 84 municipalities of Hidalgo, in central-eastern Mexico. The municipality covers an area of 156.7 km^{2}.

As of 2020, the municipality had a total population of 8,062.

== History ==
This was the center of the Tlanalapan state prior to the Spanish incursion. It was a dependency of Otompa. By 1521 the area was taken over by the Spanish. During the colonial period it was part of Apa y Tepeapulco except for a short time around 1545 when it was the center of a separate jurisdiction.
