= DINA S.A. =

Mexican truck and bus manufacturer

Grupo DINA S.A.
- Type: Private (Sociedad Anonima - S.A.)
- Industry: OEM
- Founded: 1951; 75 years ago
- Headquarters: Ciudad Sahagún, Hidalgo, Mexico
- Key people: Miguel Angel Velasco Martinez, President
- Parent: Grupo Empresarial G, S.A
- Subsidiaries: Dina Camiones & Dina Autobuses
- Website: dina.com.mx

DINA (Diesel Nacional, S.A. de C.V, in English: National Diesel) is a Mexican bus and truck manufacturer based in Ciudad Sahagún, Hidalgo, Mexico. It was created by the federal government of Mexico in 1951 as Diesel Nacional, S.A., and is currently owned by Grupo Empresarial G and its subsidiaries (since 1989). The company has gone through several stages of production of freight and bus models throughout its history, thanks to technological and commercial agreements and partnerships with various companies such as Fiat, Renault, Marcopolo S.A., Flxible, Cummins, Perkins, Chrysler, Caterpillar, Scania, MCI, Škoda, Spicer, Eaton and Dana. Today its primary production is buses for urban, domestic and foreign use. They have developed their truck technology with a subsidiary of BMW.

Currently, nearly 20% of the national vehicle fleet operate in Mexico, along with other Latin American countries.

== History ==
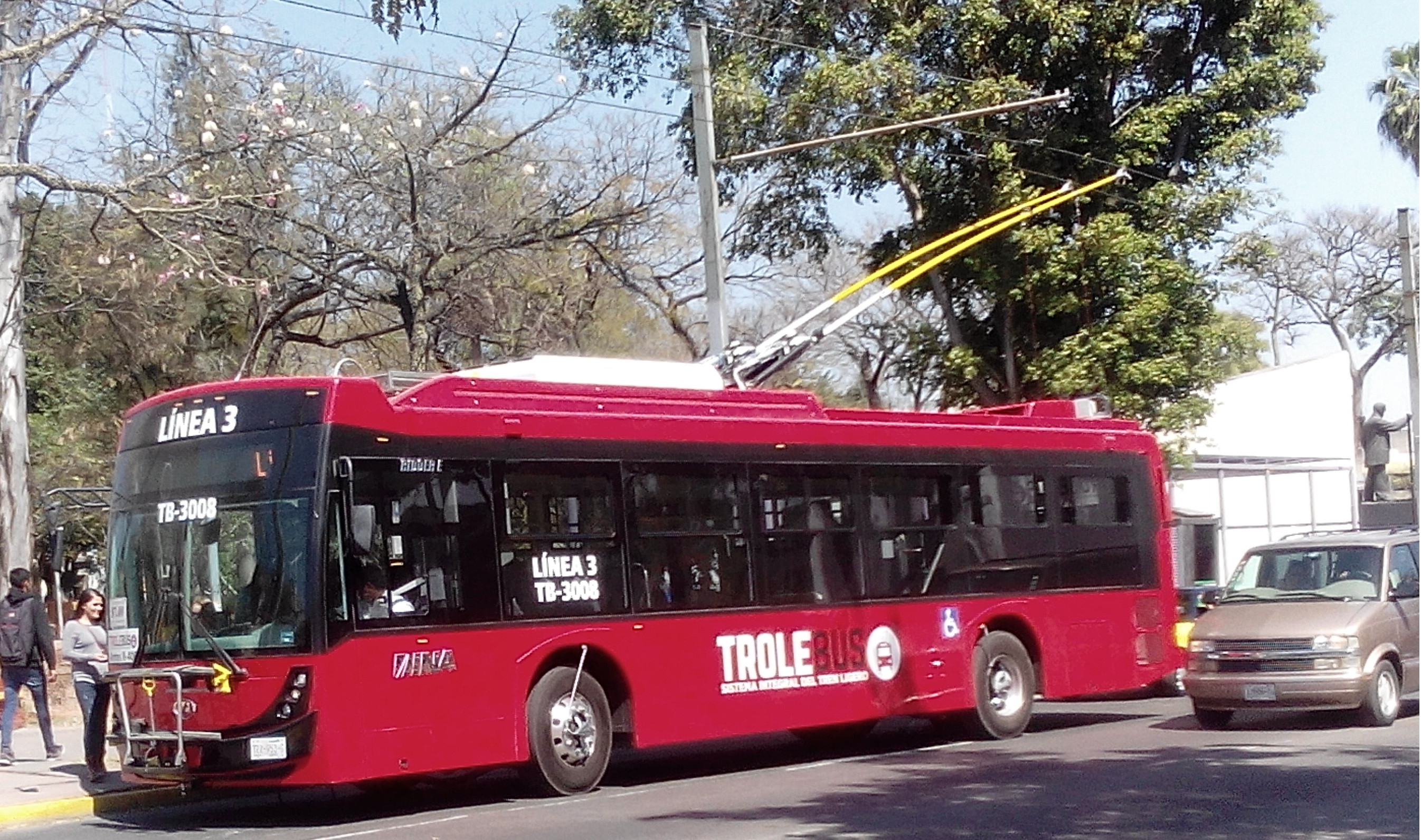
A Dina Electric Trolleybus in Guadalajara

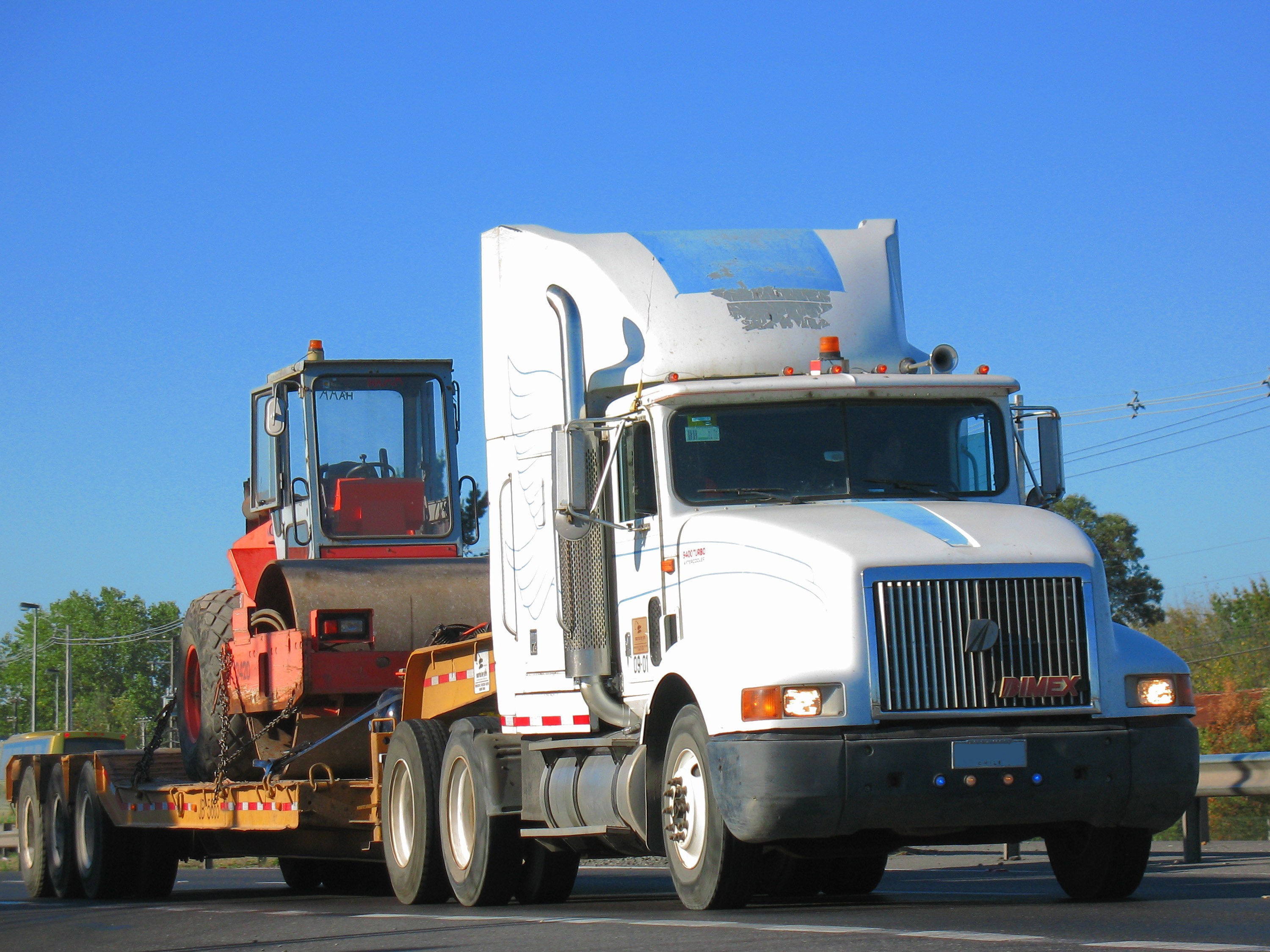
Dimex 9400 Turbo 1998

=== The beginning ===
DINA was founded as Diesel Nacional S.A in 1951 by the Mexican federal government, through the Ministry of Finance and Public Credit and Ministry of Economy. It approved the constitution of the company Diesel Nacional, SA, with a duration of 45 years and a capital stock of 75 million Mexican pesos, which was contributed by the private sector and government, with the latter being the majority shareholder. Its plant was built in the Fray Bernardino de Sahagún City in Hidalgo, Mexico.

In 1952, Diesel Nacional signed manufacturing and technical assistance agreements with the Fiat. The result was production of the first assembled units: the 682 / T tractor-truck, and later production was extended to the automotive segment with the FIAT 600, FIAT 1100 and FIAT 1400B models. The passenger transportation segment started with model 682 RN bus in 1956. The high production cost of Fiat vehicles forced the cancellation of the contract in January 1960.

In 1961, an association was started with Flxible, which allowed obtaining the license to build two bus models in Mexico, the Flxible Hi-Level and the Flxliner, known in Mexico as the DINA 311 "Hunchback" and the Olympic Dina respectively.

In 1962, the Mexican government imposed limitations on the automotive industry, which included tariff barriers on the importation of vehicles entering Mexico, for both freight and passenger transportation, as well as obtaining their components from abroad. Thus, domestic production companies benefited from protectionist policies, a situation favorable to DINA during the next three decades. Other policies served as important factors for the export of freight trucks to several Latin American countries starting in the 1970s.

In 1968, the national production of the NT and NH engines of the Cummins company began. In 1973 it bought 60% of the shares of Motores Perkins S. A., established in Mexico, to counteract its main competitor, Chrysler, which previously owned that shares. In 1987, a technological alliance was signed with Navistar International. Two years later DINA was acquired by the Consortium "G" Group DINA, though it continued to use Navistar engines.

=== Consolidation of the parastatal in the Mexican market ===
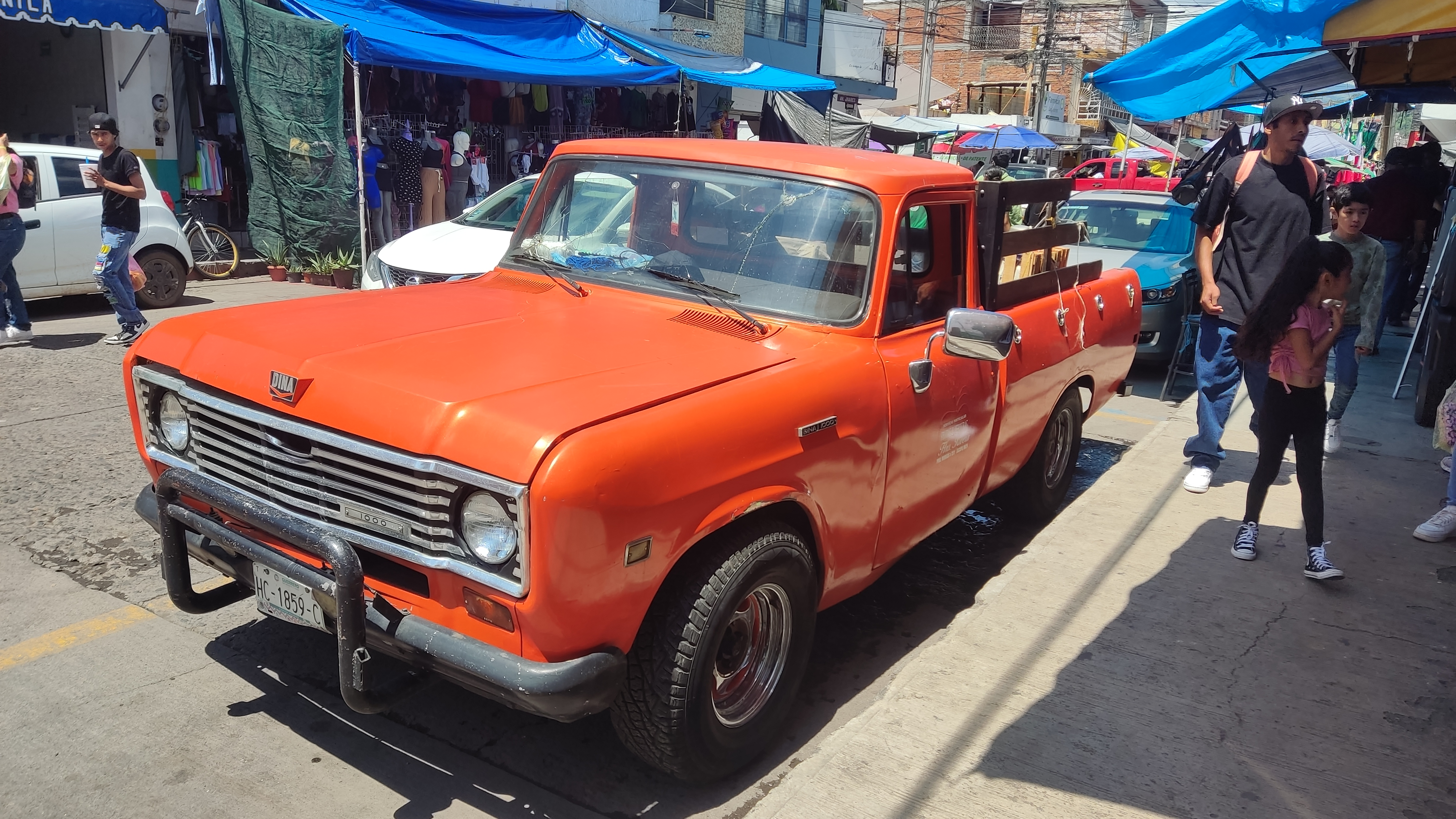
Dina D1000 in Zacapu, Mexico

Being an engine production and assembly company with tariff protection, DINA obtained agreements with Mexican companies that produced freight trucks and foreign transportation sector, from the 1970s. This was primarily with CASA (Carrocerías de Aluminio SA), CATOSA (Carrocerías Toluca S.A.) (currently OperBus) and CAPRE (Carrocerías Preconstruidas S.A.) (currently NovaCapre).

In 1974, the Maquiladora Automotriz Nacional Company (MAN) was formed to assemble pickup trucks with the DINA brand. The 1000, 3000 and 3200 models were manufactured, all with International's Scout model technology with Perkins engines, the Dina D1000 was based on International D-Series between 1974 and 1976. Later, DINA trucks were manufactured with bodies similar to Chevrolet's Custom. MAN ceased truck production in 1983.

Due to the growing demand and diversified in its line of products, from 1976 different commercial divisions were created within Diesel National SA, remaining as the main controller and forming a decentralized parastatal corporate group. Hence the corporation was primarily composed of these operating groups:

Corporate parastatal Diesel Nacional S.A. (1976–1988)
Terminal Industry
Dina Camiones S.A. de C.V.	Assemble of medium and heavy freight trucks and truck tractors.
Dina Autobuses S.A. de C.V. Mexicana de Autobuses S.A de C.V. (incorporated in 1982 until 1989)	Foreign and urban, Bus assembly companies.
Diesel Engine Industry
Dina Motores S.A. de C.V.	Company manufacturer of engines under the brand license Cummins, heavy and industrial type.
Autoparts and Support Services
Plásticos y Automotrices Dina S.A. de C.V.	Production Division of cabins, fenders, seats and other fiberglass parts.
Other companies incorporated into the corporation
Planta de Transmisiones de Dina Motores S.A. de C.V.	Manufacturer of gearboxes and machining of various metal automotive parts.
División Servicios de Dina Motores S.A. de C.V.	Catering and hospitality services for plant workers.
Planta de Herramental de Dina Camiones S.A. de C.V.	Manufacturer of tooling for assembly and machining.
División Partes de Dina Camiones, S.A. de C.V.	Service and sales of spare parts for trucks.

During the early 1980s, the bus and freight truck industry of was monopolized in Mexico, primarily concentrated in the hands of DINA and Mexicana de Autobuses S.A. (MASA). Reasons for this were unfair competition practices by other companies, with prices below actual cost, and the consolidation of previously imposed tariff restrictions. This as a result of the economic crises in that began in 1982, a situation that would be less favorable for domestic companies constituted by private investment. Thus, companies such as bus manufacturer Sultana had to suspend production and temporarily close its plants in 1982.

In 1981, DINA and Navistar (now International) entered into a technology cooperation contract. The result was the introduction of model S-series trucks, the 7400, 7800 and 9400. In 1985 it formed a partnership with General Motors for the manufacture and export of vehicles and assembly parts. During that decade DINA Autobuses reached their sales peak, led by CEO Miguel Ángel Anguiano Rodríguez.

In 1987, after several years of sales of the "Dina Olímpico" in the bus sector, a new model was launched, the D-350 G-7, later known as the "Dina Avante". It was based on the Eagle 15 adapting some features of the Flxible bodies. Other variations of the same model were later released: "Dina Dorado" and "Avante Plus".

Although the situation for the company reflected some market control, this was complicated by economic problems in the 1980s. These problems precluded continuing investment in modernization of equipment and maintenance. During 1987, the process of de-incorporation of the companies began, with the sale and closing of some companies. Dina Motores was purchased by foreign minority investor Cummins. Other companies such as Mexicana de Autobuses were sold to a group of entrepreneurs. Thus, from 1988 to 1989, the corporate liquidation process of DINA was carried out, which ended with the sale of the existing companies in the group (trucks, engines, plastics and buses) in a stock package. This ended the operation and control of DINA by the Mexican government after 38 years of operation.

=== Privatization and globalization ===
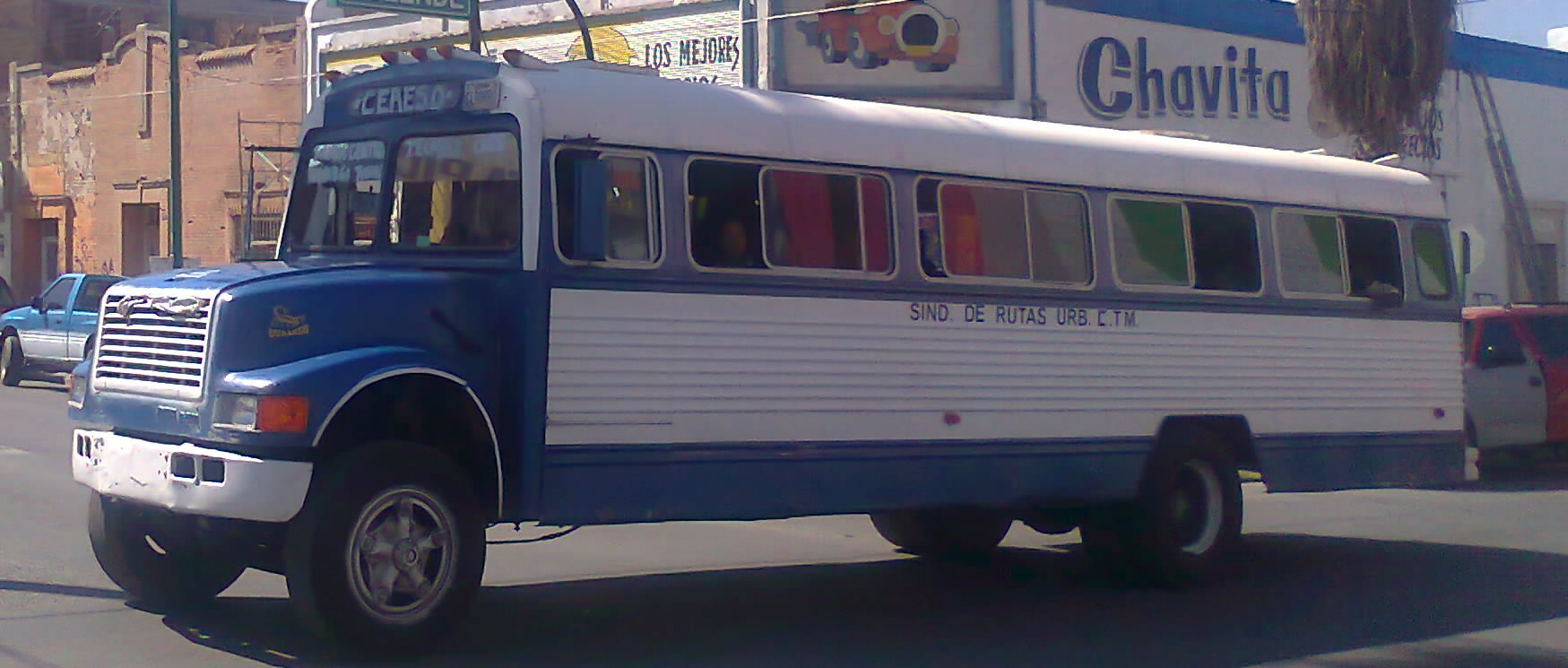
DINA bus built by Gomez Palacio company

In 1989 the parastatal Diesel Nacional, S.A. (trucks, engines, plastics and buses) was acquired by Consorcio Grupo G S.A. de C.V., owned by the Rafael (†), Armando, Guillermo, Alfonso and Raymundo Gómez Flores brothers, from Jalisco. The Gómez Flores family was a shareholder in Mexicana de Autobuses S.A. (MASA), through Motor Coach Industries (MCI).

During the first years of privatization, it maintained commercial relations with partners who had obtained agreements during its stage as a parastatal company. Thus, in 1991, DINA introduced the NAVISTAR series DTA-360 and DTA-466 engines to the freight truck and bus segments. In 1992, and lacking sufficient production capacity, a commercial and technological agreement with Marcopolo S.A., was necessary to deliver trucks in semi-knock-down form and knowledge sufficient to fulfill new bus orders. Marcopolo was a leader in production and sales of buses in South America at that time. The result of this agreement was manufacture of bodies for the Marcopolo Paradiso and Viaggio models for the Mexican market for a 10-year term. In 1993, export of these models to Central and South America began.

Chrysler had an equity percentage and sales through its dealers. Grupo G acquired these shares and consolidated its own network of distributors. Navistar was also liquidated in its shareholding.

In 1994, the DINA Composites, S.A. of C.V. company was established to develop plastic technologies for the automotive industry.

That same year, Grupo G acquired the assembly plants of Motor Coach Industries to facilitate exports to the North American market. MCI was for many years the largest producer of intercity and tour buses in the US and Canada. It had plants in Winnipeg and North Dakota.

In 1996, it introduced Caterpillar CAT engines, instead of Navistar engines, for freight trucks and passenger buses.

In 1997 it inaugurated its truck and bus assembly plant in the industrial zone of the Mercedes town, in Buenos Aires, Argentina, becoming the company "International Dina" in "DIMEX" as a subsidiary of DINA Camiones S.A. de C.V. of Mexico. Negotiations to operate there took place two years before. The production started with the assembly of the S-series trucks imported from its Mexican headquarters. The sales of trucks had achieved a 5% and 1% in buses and trucks in 1998, based on the then-current Argentine automotive market. In April 1999, the production, assembly and sales of its own range of HTQ (High Technology and Quality) of chassis and trucks in Argentina began: D1416, D1721 and D1725.

With the growth of the company, different operating groups were integrated as DINA subsidiaries, as had been done when the company was federally-owned in the 1980s. At the end of the 1990s the company had several subsidiaries and operating groups:

Grupo Diesel Nacional S.A. de C.V. (1989–2001)
Transportation Industry
Dina Camiones S.A. de C.V	Assemble of medium and heavy freight trucks, and tractor-trucks.
Dina Autobuses S.A. de C.V	Bus assembly companies, foreign and urban.
International subsidiaries
Motor Coach Industries International Inc.	US subsidiary company of DINA (from 1994 to 1999) bus manufacturer in North America.
Internacional DINA S.A.	Argentine subsidiary company of DINA (from 1998 to 2001) assembly and manufacturer of buses, chassis and trucks in South America.
DINAMEX Chile S.A.	Distributor subsidiary of Internacional DINA (from 1998 to 2001) in Chile.
Autoparts and Support Services
DINA Composites S.A. de C.V.	Production division of reinforced thermosetting plastics and molding compounds for cabins.
Universal Coach Parts México S.A. de C.V.	Subsidiary in charge of purchase, sale, distribution, import and export of spare parts, parts and accessories for trucks, buses and tractor-trucks.
Mexicana de Manufacturas Especiales S.A. de C.V	Support of supplies of metal-mechanical parts for production of trucks and buses, and manufacture of urban and suburban bodies.
Other companies incorporated into the group
Arrendadora Financiera Dina S.A. de C.V.	Financial services for the acquisition of buses and trucks of the company in Mexico.

In 1997 new models of buses and trucks were built in the Sahagún plant, based on their own designs and entirely Mexican. In the bus segment were the F11 models, in 1998 the F12 model, and in 1999 the F14 model. In the truck segment were the HTQ series (models 55117572, 66121072, 77631072, 9400 and 65019570). The development of the new HTQ series was jointly designated by Design Works, a subsidiary of BMW, MCII and Roush Industries USA, with an investment of nearly US$100 million.

=== The importance of being called DINA ===
In October 1999 Sterling Trucks of Freightliner LLC (subsidiaries of Daimler) acquired Western Star Trucks, with the sole purpose of breaking it so that it in turn damaged DINA Trucks, since it had signed an agreement with DINA for the production of 9,000 freight trucks. On February 7, 2000, the strike of the Sindicato Nacional Independiente de Trabajadores de la Industria Automotriz, Similares y Conexos broke out, whose main request was a 24% increase in salary, when the company could only offer 13% more 2% in benefits. Concludied three days later with the acceptance of 13% increase.

On July 20, 2000, Western Star Trucks was acquired by Freightliner, the reaction was that contracts with DINA were reviewed in October 1999 that contemplated the assembly of HTQ trucks to re-branded trucks in the North American market. Once acquired Western Star by Freightliner, it cancelled the contract with DINA unilaterally and only 700 units were manufactured for sale in North America, instead of the 9,000 units contracted. Workers began a strike on October 6, 2000, lasting until March 6, 2001, demanding a 40% salary increase. On October 28, DINA filed a claim for breach of contract with Western Star Trucks with the International Chamber of Commerce for US$110 million. On January 31, 2001, it announced cuts of 6% of its workers followed by a 40% layoffs in April 2001.

In February 2001, the resizing of the company DINA Trucks for the resumption of regular operations without the Western Star contract was evident. On September 11, 2001, the DINA Trucks plant in Ciudad Sahagún, Hidalgo, was shuttered due to the termination of a 52-year union with the Federal Government. The strategy was for the purchase of the collective contract with the union that had many faults, and was highly inefficient.

The plants had more than 80 hectares, much of it surplus. It was decided to downsize and liquidate the union. The company was left with 23 hectares, which was what was actually needed for production.

The government of the state of Hidalgo led by Manuel Ángel Núñez Soto, took charge of the assets of the company, only of DINA Camiones, liquidating its 559 workers in the year 2002.

=== Conclusion of the resizing of DINA Buses in Mexico ===
In 2001, to avoid bankruptcy, a group of administrative staff of Grupo Empresarial G, owners of the company remnants, carried out the financial restructuring of DINA Camiones. This process consisted of the sale of the plants that the group owned. In 2002, the government of the state of Hidalgo bought the facilities of the DINA Camiones plant. In 2005, a group of Argentine businessmen bought the Argentine DINA plant. Subsequently, problems arising due to the cancellation of the contract with Western Star Trucks, was settled by legal means. Freightliner paid a large compensation to the Mexican company. In compliance with the agreement, the amount was not disclosed.

In 2004, the process of designing new passenger units began, based on HTQ technology, as well as on national and international standards.

Starting in 2007, the first five prototypes of the chassis were concluded. The design and construction of a new plant began, along with the necessary equipment and tools. This was in the same industrial zone of Ciudad Sahagún, state of Hidalgo, Mexico. In July 2007, a prototype departed the new DINA plant. Its purpose was to conduct road tests, prior to production and marketing.

In May 2008, the restart of DINA Camiones was announced, with the production and sales of four new bus models, all of them the urban type: DINA Linner, Runner, Picker and Outsider.

At the time of restarting operations that year, the investment was US$100 million. The plant had a capacity of 23 units per day, 450 direct and 750 indirect jobs, and five concessionaires in different Mexican states to sell their units in Mexico.

=== Present ===
To this day, the company offers different products and services for transport, always focused on the urban and foreign bus market. The firm launched a gas-powered bus, the DINA Linner G in the year 2010, and also a specific cargo truck, the DINA Hustler in the year 2011, a tractor-truck for container transport in commercial ports.

By increasing their participation in the Mexican market once again, DINA resumed exporting units to some countries in Central America, where certain models of the company currently circulate. Thus, by increasing its commercial presence, other bus models were launched in 2013. The firm returned to the foreign transport segment, the DINA Buller.

== Products and services ==
=== Buses and trucks ===
- Family of light, medium and heavy trucks HTQ, class 5, 6, 7 and 8;
- Yard tractor-truck for ports;
- Family of urban buses Liner: 8, 10, 12 to Diesel and Natural gas, rear engine;
- Family of urban buses Runer: 8, 9, 10, 11 to Diesel and Natural gas, front engine;
- Family of urban buses Picker: 8, 10 m to Diesel and Natural gas, front engine;
- Family Bus Rapid Transit, urban buses, from 12 to 18 m, Brighter and Rider models, to Diesel and Natural gas, rear engine;
- Trolleybus Rider 12 m low floor;
- Long-distance bus Buller of 12 m to Diesel rear engine (in development for reintroduction to that market);
- Model Outsider bus, rear engine, 11 m to Diesel, suburban;
- Urban bus Silux of 8 m to Diesel, rear engine.

=== Other services ===
- Post-sale;
- Warranty;
- Spare parts;
- Financing;
- Training for customers about their DINA products.

== Bus models ==
Throughout its history, Dina has produced a variety of passenger buses.

=== Previous models ===
- 231 Convencional
- 311 FLEXIBLE
- Ayco
- Avante
- Avante Plus
- CAPRE 500 Convencional
- Casabus
- CATOSA 500 Convencional Sansón
- CATOSA Atlántico
- CATOSA Pacífico
- CATOSA Puma
- CATOSA Tollocan MT
- Chasis D-1622
- Chasis D-1422
- Chasis D-1116
- Citus
- Dorado
- Eurocar HR
- Eurocar BR2000
- Foráneo 11
- Foráneo 12
- Foráneo 14
- Marcopolo Paradiso
- Marcopolo Viaggio
- Olímpico

=== Current models ===
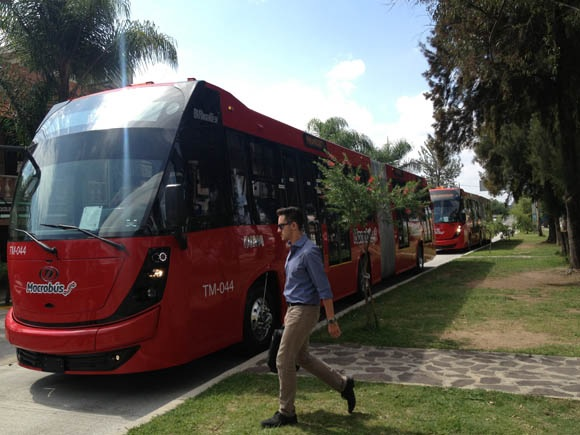
DINA BRighTer

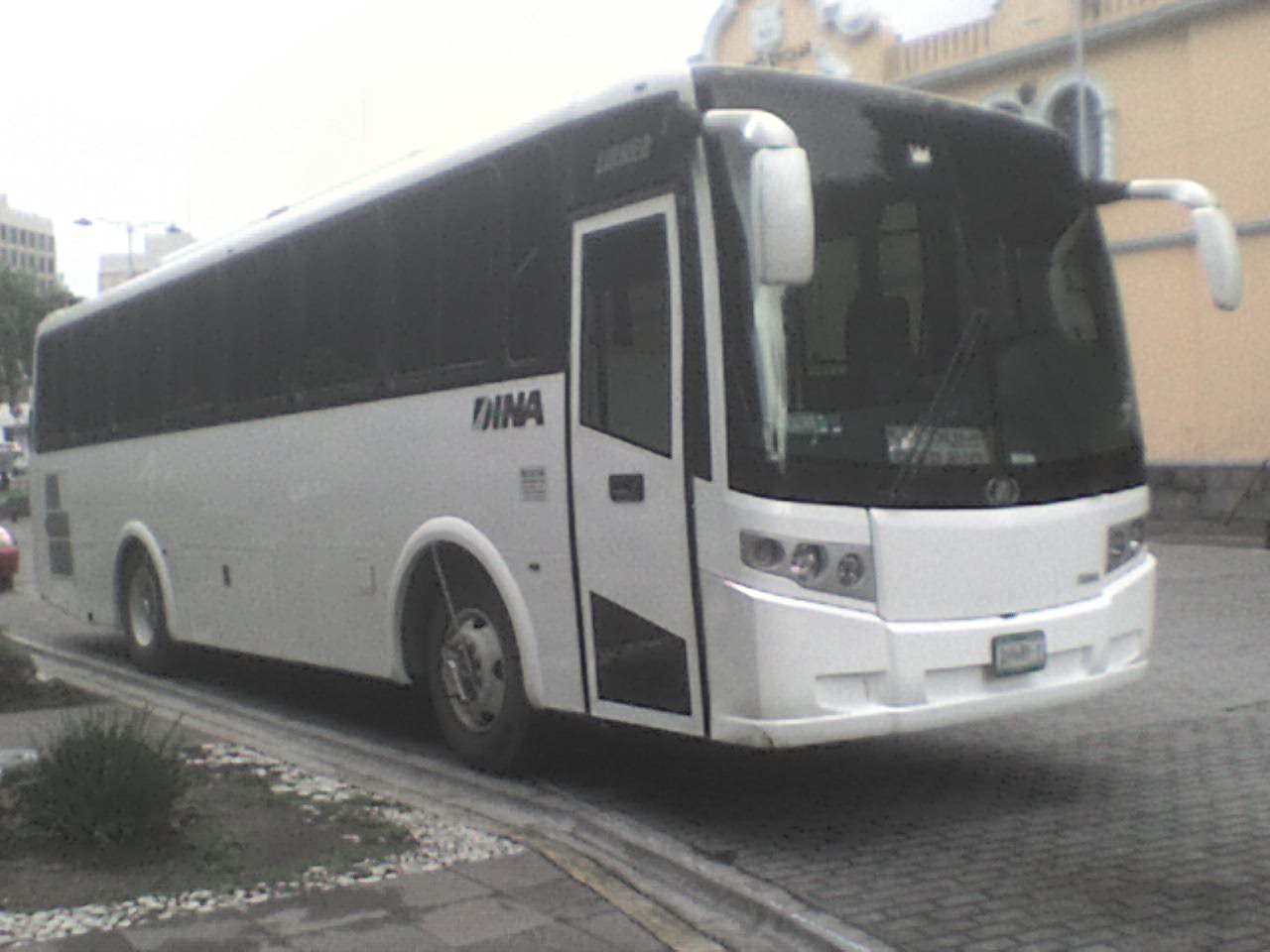
DINA Linner

- BRighTer - Bus Rapid Transport
- Buller
- HTQ Runner 8 - Front engine
- HTQ Runner 9 - Front engine
- HTQ Runner 9G - Front engine / Natural gas
- HTQ Runner 10 - Front engine
- HTQ Linner 10 - Rear engine
- HTQ Linner G - Rear engine / Natural gas
- HTQ Outsider - Rear engine
- HTQ Picker - Front engine
- Hustler
- Ridder
- Ridder G
- Ridder E (Trolleybus)

== Companies operating DINA vehicles ==
=== Domestic ===
- Trolebús de Guadalajara (SITREN Línea 3 at Guadalajara City)
- Transregio (Monterrey City, natural gas buses)
- Metrobus (Mexico City, articulated units)
- Grupo Martínez (transport operator at state of Nuevo León, natural gas buses)
- Grupo Trees (Monterrey City, natural gas buses)
- Estrella Blanca (Conexión, outsiders)
- Acabús (Acapulco City, integrated transportation system)
- Red de Transporte de Pasajeros (Mexico City)
- Grupo Senda (business transport units)
- Transportes Vencedor (business transport units)
- Transportes Roca de Juárez (business transport units)
- CityBus (Oaxaca City, metropolitan transportation system)
- Transportes Unidos Costa Pacífico (Puerto Vallarta City, gas and diesel units, integrated system)
- Lipu (business transport units)

=== Foreign ===
- Managua, Nicaragua (replacement of yellow buses). Buses are now retired and replaced by Yutong and Asiastar buses.
- Colombia, natural gas units and shuttle service in Medellín City (SAO)
- SSA Marine, Long Beach, CA, USA (Yard tractor-trucks)
