= Almoloya, Hidalgo =

Almoloya
- Town and municipality
- Coat of arms

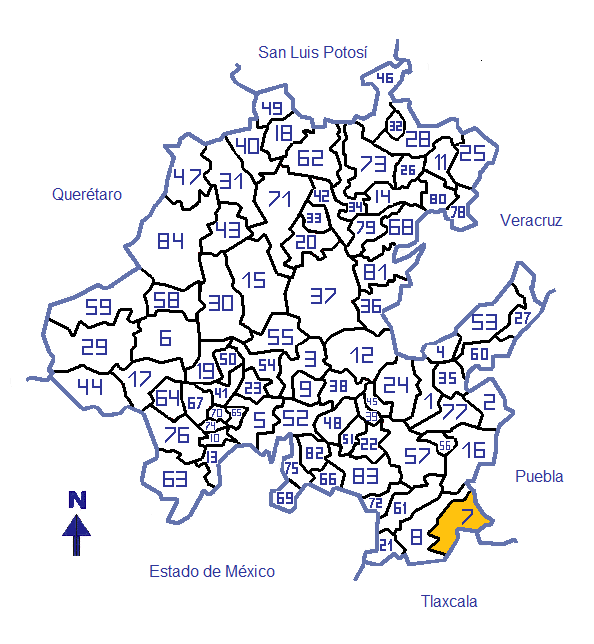
- Location in the state of Hidalgo

- Location in Mexico
- Coordinates: 19°42′N 98°24′W
- Country: Mexico
- State: Hidalgo
- Municipality: Almoloya

Government
  - Federal electoral district: Hidalgo's 7th

Area
  - Total: 282.7 km^{2} (109.2 sq mi)

Population (2005)
  - Total: 10,638
- Time zone: UTC-6 (Zona Centro)
- Website: almoloya.hidalgo.gob.mx

Almoloya is a town and one of the 84 municipalities of Hidalgo, in central-eastern Mexico. The municipality covers an area of 282.7 km^{2} (109.2 sq mi).

As of 2005, the municipality had a total population of 10,638.

During the colonial period Almoloya was part of the corregimiento of Apa y Tepeapulco. The church of Concepcion Almoloya was established by 1697.
