= Tepeapulco =

- Town and municipality
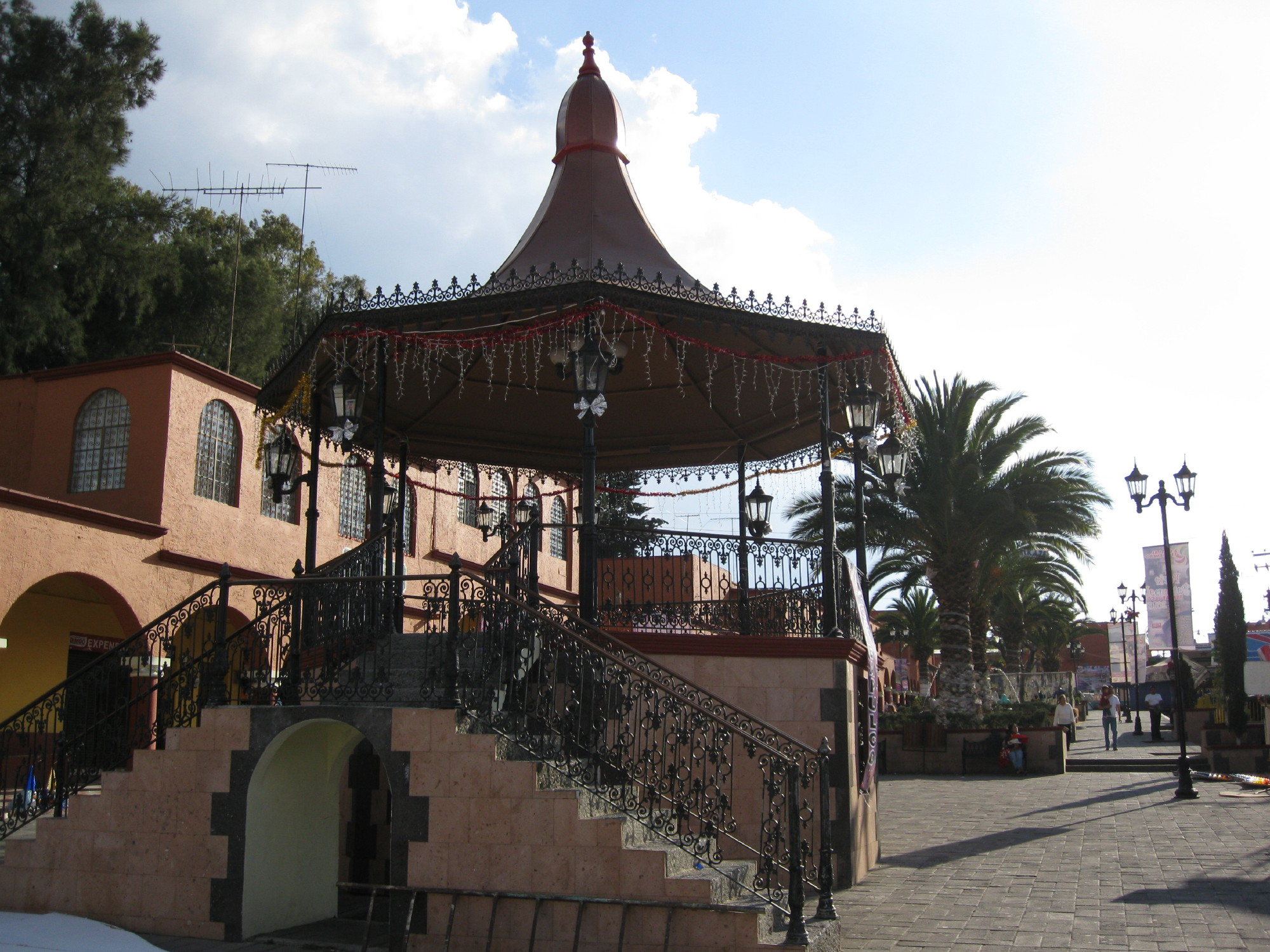

- Coat of arms

- Location within Hidalgo Location within Mexico
- Coordinates: 19°47′08″N 98°33′06″W
- Country: Mexico
- State: Hidalgo
- Municipality: Tepeapulco
- Town: 1527
- Municipality: 1824
- Municipal seat: City of Tepeapulco

Government
  - Body: Honorable City Hall of Tepeapulco
  - Mayor or municipal president: Alberto Franco (Institutional Revolutionary Party)
  - Federal electoral district: Hidalgo's 7th

Area
  - Total: 239 km^{2} (92 sq mi)

Population (2005)
  - Total: 49,850
- Time zone: UTC-6 (Zona Centro)
- Postal code (C.P.): 43978
- Area code: 791
- Website: tepeapulco.gob.mx

Tepeapulco is a town and one of the 84 municipalities of Hidalgo, in central Mexico.The municipality covers an area of 239 km^{2} (92 sq mi).

As of 2005, the municipality had a total population of 49,850.

During the Spanish colonial period it was part of the domain of the alcaldia mayor of Apa y Tepeapulco. The parish of San Francisco Tepeapulco was established in 1527.

== See also ==
- Ciudad Sahagún, the most populous settlement in the municipality.
