= Comarca Minera Geopark =

Geopark in Hidalgo, Mexico

- Location within Mexico
- Coordinates: 20°12′53″N 98°43′50″W
- Area: 1,848 km^{2} (714 sq mi)
- Designated: May 5, 2017
- Administrator: UNESCO
- Website: www.geoparquehidalgo.com

The Comarca Minera Geopark is located in the center-south of the Mexican state of Hidalgo. It extends over nine municipalities: Atotonilco el Grande, Epazoyucan, Huasca de Ocampo, Mineral del Chico, Mineral de la Reforma, Mineral del Monte, Omitlán de Juárez, Pachuca de Soto and Singuilucan. These municipalities are articulated by a network of 31 geosites, elected because they express the geological history of the territory and highlight the relationship between mining and metallurgy, and the historical spaces and cultural development of the region. In addition, they are important for science and education and, mostly, have a significant landscape value.

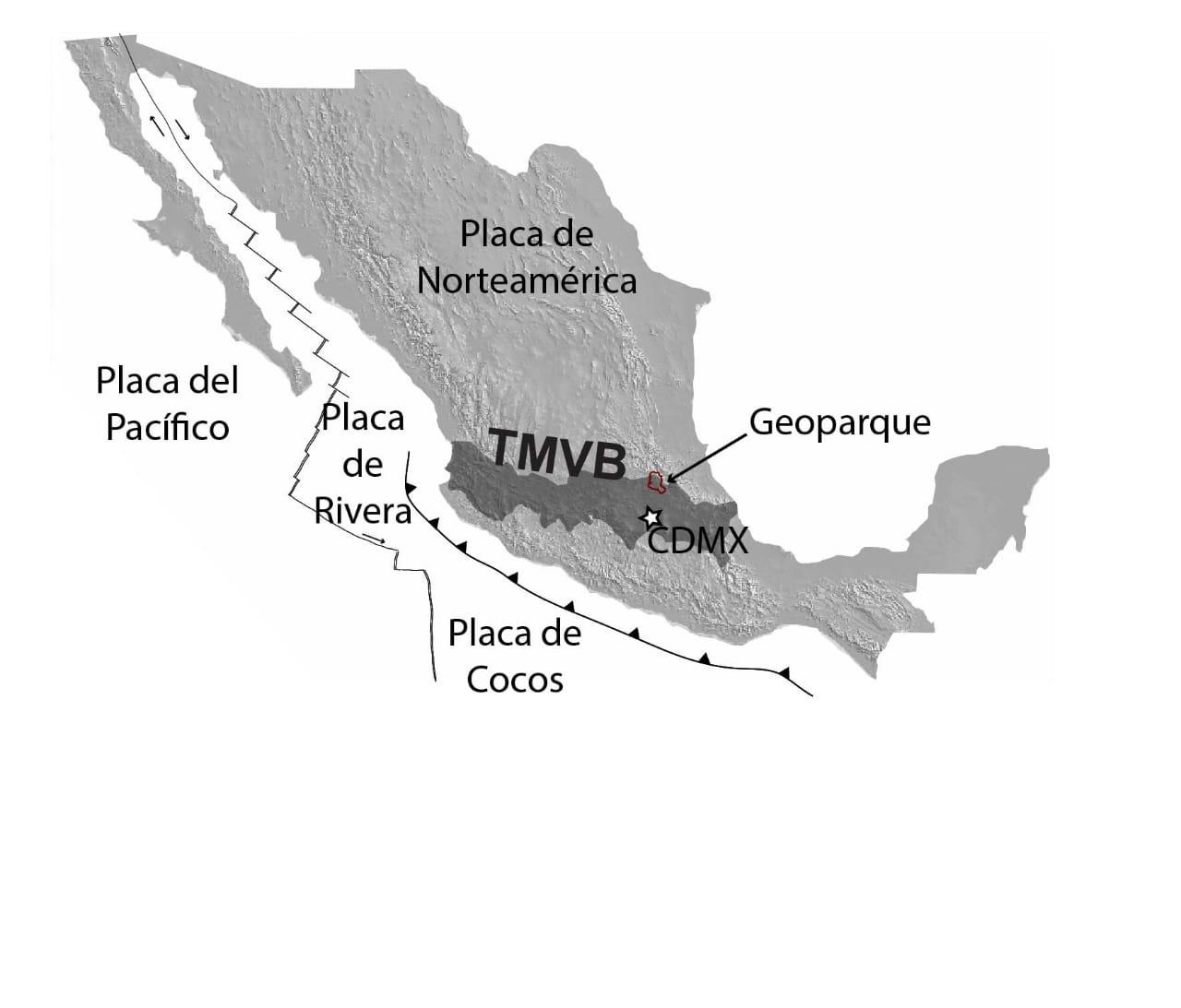
Tectonic situation of the geopark

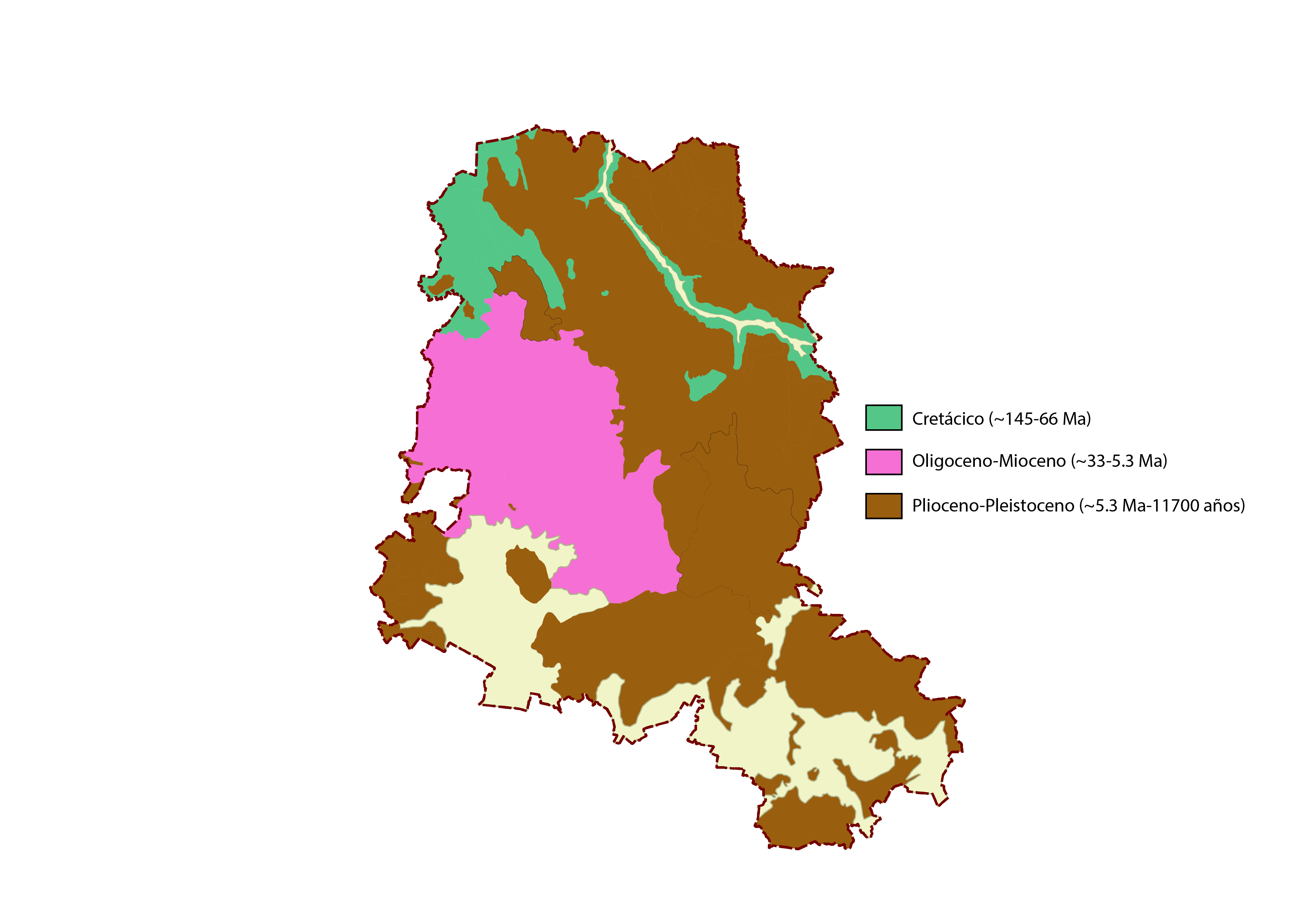
Simplified geological map of the geopark

== Geology ==
The Pachuca and Las Nevajas mountain ranges constitute the most important physiographic element of the Comarca Minera, with maximum altitudes in the Peña de las Ventanas (3090 m) and in the Cerro de las Navajas (3212 m), respectively. This orographic set has a northwest–southeast general orientation, and separates the area of the Sierra Baja and Barranca de Metztitlán (at north of the mountain ranges), with altitudes of ~ 1300–2000 m, from the northern end of the Mexico Basin (at south of the mountain ranges), with an altitude of ~ 2200–2400 m. The huge geodiversity of the park, appreciable in its geosites, is due to the fact that two physiographic provinces converge in the area, the Sierra Madre Oriental and the Transmexican Volcanic Belt, as well as two magmatic provinces, one related to the Transmexican Volcanic Belt and the other related to the volcanism of the Sierra Madre Occidental.

The Comarca Minera is characterized by an outstanding geopatrimony, which includes at least five geological (and cultural elements related to geology) that can be considered of international relevance:

1. The epithermal system (Ag-Au) of Pachuca-Mineral del Monte, one of the largest in the world; its historical production represents 6% of the silver produced globally during the last five centuries.
2. The type locality, in the Cerro de San Cristóbal de Pachuca geosite, of tridymite and cristobalite, minerals discovered by Gerhard vom Rath in the years 1868 and 1887, respectively.
3. The basalts with columnar jointing of Santa María Regla, Huasca de Ocampo, popularly known as the "prismas basálticos" (basaltic prisms), described and drawn by Alexander von Humboldt in 1803; they are generally considered the longest in the world (they reach 40 m in length).
4. The mining industrial heritage, which includes haciendas de beneficio from the colonial era, as well as various mining works, among which those from the English mining period (mid-19th century), with splendid examples of Cornish-type machine houses, stand out.
5. The Cerro de las Navajas, main point of exploitation and supply of obsidian for Mesoamerica, and exceptional site where obsidian in its golden and green varieties can be found.

=== Cretaceous ===
The oldest rocks in the geopark are limestones and shales of marine origin, of Cretaceous age, which are found in the northeastern portion of the territory and outcrop at the bottom of the Barranca de Metztitlán. It can be seen in the geosites:

- Barranca de Aguacatitla
- Aguas termales de Amajac

=== Paleogene ===
During this period, the belt of folds and ridges was formed, geographically known as Sierra Madre Oriental, through a compressive process that thickened and shortened the crust and raised the previously formed rocks in the sea to their current position. Towards the end of this period began the volcanism related to the subduction of the western Mexico. In the northwest sector of the geopark there are deformation structures, mainly asymmetric or even lying folds, of NNO-SSE direction, which can be seen in the geosites:

- Barranca de Aguacatitla
- Aguas termales de Amajac

The volcanic rocks from the Oligocene are found in:

- Depósitos tobáceos de Cubitos
- Mirador Cerro del Lobo

=== Miocene ===
The magmatism initiated at the end of the Paleogene until the Middle Miocene, and it was responsible for large volumes of silicic volcanic rocks that constitute one of the most southeastern manifestations of the igneous province of the Sierra Madre Occidental. Associated with these rocks the epithermal mineral deposits of silver were formed, with an early Miocene age in the case of Pachuca-Real del Monte deposits, and a somewhat more recent (late Miocene) for those of Mineral del Chico.

Rhyolitic tuffs of the Tezoantla and Cerezo formations as well as rhyolitic and dacitic porphyry can be seen in the geosites:

- Peña Las Monjas
- Peña del Cuervo
- Las Ventanas
- Depósitos Volcánicos de El Chico

The mineralization of late Miocene can be seen in:

- Obras Mineras El Milagro

=== Pliocene ===
The style and composition of volcanism changes due to the subhorizontal subduction of the Cocos Plate under the North American Plate, and resulted in the configuration of the Transmexican Volcanic Belt, which is still active today. Examples of volcanic rocks from the Pliocene are found in:

- Cerro de San Cristóbal (in the homonymous formation)
- Peña del Diablo y Peña del Comal

Fossiliferous lacustrine sediments (with remains of plants and fish) are also from the Pliocene and it can be found in:

- Aguas termales de Amajac

=== Pleistocene ===
The volcanism of the Trans-Mexican Volcanic Belt is responsible for the volcanic stream of the geosite:

- Prismas basálticos (dated in 2.58 Myr)

and of the monogenetic volcanoes of Singuilucan, appreciable in the geosite:

- Estructuras volcánicas de la Paila

=== Holocene ===
Regarding the exploitation of natural resources, in the geopark and throughout the continent, the greatest change was triggered by the meeting between the Old and the New World; in the pre-Columbian era, obsidian was intensely exploited and, after the conquest, mining was concentrated on precious metals.

As a manifestation of the active geological phenomena, at the northwest of the geopark there is the geothermal site (and geosite) of:

- Aguas termales de Amajac (hot springs spa)

== Geopark geosites ==
The geopark consists of 31 geosites of geological, biological and cultural interest:

1. Aguas termales de Amajac
2. Barranca de Aguacatitla
3. Cantera de Tezoantla
4. Cerro de las Navajas
5. Cerro de San Cristóbal
6. Cristo Rey
7. Depósitos tobáceos de Cubitos
8. Depósitos volcánicos de El Chico
9. Estructuras volcánicas de La Paila
10. Ex-Convento de San Agustín
11. Ex-Convento de San Andrés Apóstol
12. Ex-Hacienda La Purísima
13. Mirador Cerro del Lobo
14. Mirador Las Ventanas
15. Museo del Paste
16. Museo de la Mineralogía
17. Obras mineras El Milagro
18. Panteón Inglés
19. Parque Estatal Bosque el Hiloche
20. Peña del Aire
21. Peña del Cuervo
22. Peña del Diablo y Piedra del Comal
23. Peñas Cargadas
24. Peñas Las Monjas
25. Presa El Cedral
26. Presa San Antonio
27. Prismas basálticos
28. Reloj Monumental
29. Reserva de la Biósfera de la Barranca de Metztitlán
30. San Miguel Regla
31. Traquita El Guajolote

== Flora and fauna ==
=== Flora ===
Favored by its physiography of contrasts, reflecting its geological complexity, the territory of the Comarca Minera has numerous biomes that alternate with agricultural and urban areas, supporting a very diverse fauna. In the highest areas (altitudes above 2600 m), with a temperate and cold-temperate climate, there are oyamel forests (Abies religiosa), whose best preservation zone is the Parque Nacional El Chico. The mountainous areas of lower altitude, especially the Las Navajas mountain range and the northern slope of the Pachuca mountain range, are covered by pine forests and mixed pine-oak forests. The diversity of pine species is huge; among which the patula pine (Pinus patula), the Hartweg's pine (Pinus hartwegii) and the teocote (Pinus teocote), while the most representative of the oaks is the netleaf oak (Quercus rugosa). In the sunniest slopes of the Pachuca mountain range and at altitudes below 2000 m, at the north end of the geopark xeric shrublands can be found with abundant cactus such as bilberry cactus (Myrtillocactus geometrizans), several species of biznaga (Mammillaria magnimamma, Echinofossulocactus crispatus) and nopal (Opuntia streptacantha, O. tomentosa, O. robusta), cane cholla (Cylindropuntia imbricata) and Mexican fencepost cactus (Marginatocereus marginatus), also several species of agave (Agave horrida, A. triangularis), highlighting the pulquero agave (Agave salmiana) for its use for traditional pulque production.

=== Fauna ===
The variety and alternation of natural and agricultural ecosystems supports an important diversity of birds and reptiles. Among the first, the following species stand out for being easily observable: scarlet flycatcher (Pyrocephalus rubinus), black phoebe (Sayornis nigricans), red warbler (Cardellina rubra), yellow-rumped warbler (Setophaga coronata), house finch (Haemorhous mexicanus), lesser goldfinch (Spinus psaltria), yellow-eyed junco (Junco phaeonotus), black-headed grosbeak (Pheucticus melanocephalus), curve-billed thrasher (Toxostoma curvirostre), broad-billed hummingbird (Cynanthus latirostris), white-eared hummingbird (Hylocharis leucotis), Rivoli's hummingbird (Eugenes fulgens), blue-throated mountaingem (Lampornis clemenciae), Lucifer sheartail (Calothorax lucifer), ladder-backed woodpecker (Dryobates scalaris), golden-fronted woodpecker (Melanerpes aurifrons), acorn woodpecker (Melanerpes formicivorus), black-vented oriole (Icterus wagleri), bullock's oriole (Icterus bullockii), Steller's jay (Cyanocitta stelleri) and green kingfisher (Chloroceryle americana). As for reptiles, more than 30 species have been identified; the more relevant, due to their emblematic character and for being listed as threatened (NOM-059-SEMARNAT-2010), is the Mexican plateau horned lizard (Phrynosoma orbiculare). Among mammals, the rock squirrel (Otospermophilus variegatus), Mexican gray squirrel (Sciurus aureogaster), ring-tailed cat (Bassariscus astutus), North American opossum (Didelphis virginiana) and eastern cottontail (Sylvilagus floridanus) are regularly observed. More elusive, they also inhabit the geopark: white-tailed deer (Odocoileus virginianus), southern pocket gopher (Thomomys umbrinus), coyote (Canis latrans) and the gray fox (Urocyon cinereoargenteus). Also various bats species (Leptonycteris nivalis, Desmodus rotundus, Choeronycteris mexicana, Dermanura azteca). This biodiversity also includes 10 species of amphibians.

== Protected natural areas ==
=== National ===
- Parque Nacional El Chico
- Reserva de la Biósfera de la Barranca de Metztitlán

=== State-owned ===
- Parque Ecológico Cubitos
- Parque Estatal Bosque el Hiloche
- Zona de Preservación Ecológica de los Centros de Población Cerro La Paila-Matías Rodríguez

== Human settlement ==
=== First settlers ===
According to the geoarchaeological evidence of the Cerro de las Navajas geosite, the territory of the Comarca Minera played a fundamental role in the economic development and military power of the pre-Columbian states of Mesoamerica, as it was the control center of exploitation and focal point of distribution of obsidian. These activities were carried out successively by the Teotihuacan (100 BC – 650 AD), Toltec (950–1100 AD) and Mexica (1325–1521 AD) cultures, extending until the early colonial period.

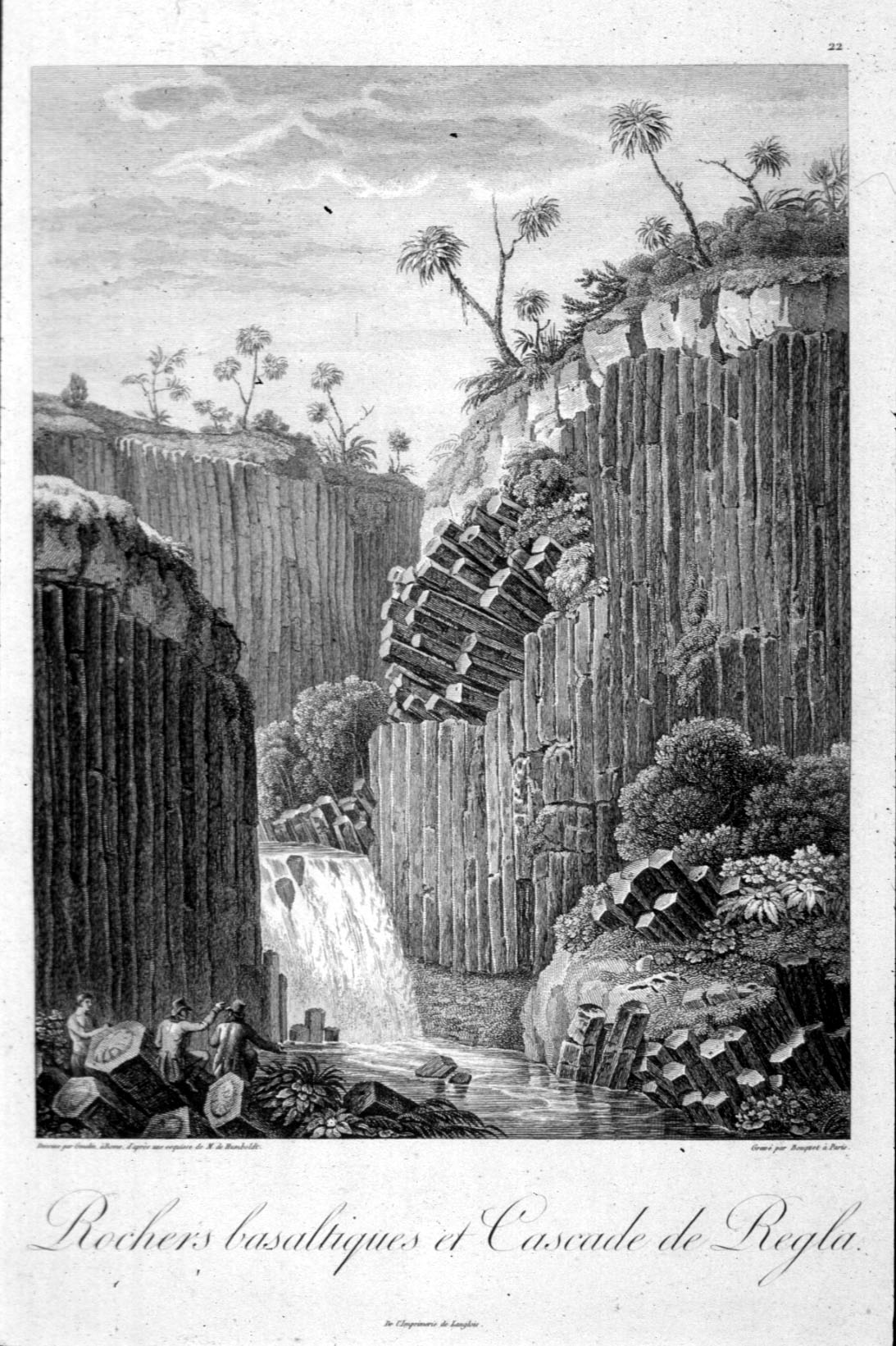
"Views of the mountain ranges and monuments of the indigenous peoples of America" (1810)

=== Geological explorations ===
The Comarca Minera has been the subject of geological studies and surveys for five centuries. In particular, it was in the 19th century when Mexican and foreign scientists conducted detailed studies. One of them was the German geologist Friedrich Traugott Sonneschmid (1763–1824) who was commissioned by the Monarchy of Spain in 1788 to carry out the improvement of mining, profit and extraction, and to make mineralogical descriptions in New Spain. In the course of twelve years he toured the current states of México, Hidalgo, Guanajuato, San Luis Potosí, Zacatecas, Durango and Jalisco. As a result of this commission there are several studies; one of them, the "Mineralogical description of the important mining regions of Mexico or New Spain", published in 1804, includes valuable data on the Comarca Minera, such as obsidian and clays of Real del Monte, Pachuca and Atotonilco el Chico, as well as the basalts with columnar jointing of Huasca de Ocampo.

Prussian wise Alexander von Humboldt (1769–1859) toured and described several places of Pachuca, Las Navajas mountain range, the mines of El Morán, Real del Monte, Regla, La Vizcaína, El Jacal and El Encino, as part of the expedition that he went on between May 15 and 27, 1803. After his visit, he integrated his observations in his vast scientific work; in his book "Views of the mountain ranges and monuments of the indigenous peoples of America" (1810) he dedicated a chapter to the geosite Prismas basálticos, under the title of "Basaltic Rocks and Cascade of Regla", in which he makes comparisons with those of the Giant's Causeway of Ireland.

After the Independence of Mexico, in 1821, numerous foreign capitals arrived in the country, establishing the first mining companies of English and German investors in the most productive former colonial districts, such as Guanajuato, Jalisco, Zacatecas, Chihuahua, Oaxaca and Estado de México. Some foreign engineers, travelers and diplomats made expeditions and wrote books about the economic possibilities of mining. The most emblematic are: George Francis Lyon, Henry Ward, Joseph Burkart, Henri Guillaume Galeotti, Eugéne Saint Clair Duport, Carl de Berghes and Friedrich von Gerolt.

=== Mining history ===
Attracted by the enormous mining wealth of the region, the Sevillian metallurgist Bartolomé de Medina arrived in Hidalgo's territory in 1552. One year later, in the Ex-Hacienda La Purísima (current geopark geosite), Pachuca, implemented the method of amalgamation, also known as patio process; using mercury, this method allowed efficiently extract silver from the ore. The patio process, active until the beginning of the 20th century, was exported to all mining districts of America, from Zacatecas in New Spain to Potosí in Bolivia, becoming essential for the silver and economic boom in the Spanish Empire.

At the beginning of the 19th century, with the Independence of Mexico, mining was opened to English participation. Coming from Cornwall, in the southwest extreme of Great Britain, English mining migration arrived, bringing with it technical knowledge and capital. Huge fireplaces and Cornish houses set up a new industrial landscape. However, despite the large investments and numerous efforts, the English failed to recover their investment. In 1848 they sold their rights to Mexican businessmen.

The Escandón brothers integrated foreign technology with local knowledge and rethink the way to extract the ore, bringing a renewed mining bonanza. This period had a 50-year boom; its decline happened due to the worldwide depreciation of silver. The United States Smelting Refining and Mining Company acquired the mining properties in 1906. The American period brought a change of method: the cyanidation. During this period a complex network of air and underground transportation for the mineral was created.

The Americans withdrew in 1947; Since then, the statal period that lasted more than 40 years begins. Currently the Compañía Real del Monte y Pachuca is the owner, as a subsidiary of Altos Hornos de México and Grupo Acerero del Norte.

Silver Mines in the municipalities of Mineral del Monte, Mineral de la Reforma and Pachuca

== Tourism and cultural heritage ==
=== Pueblos mágicos (magical towns) ===
The Pueblos Mágicos tourism program began nationwide in the Comarca Minera, with the designation in 2001 of Huasca de Ocampo, the first in the country. Currently, the geopark includes three Pueblos Mágicos (of the 121 of the program):

- Huasca de Ocampo
- Mineral del Chico
- Mineral del Monte

=== Museums in the geopark ===
- Museo de Mineralogía de la Universidad Autónoma del Estado de Hidalgo
- Museo del Paste

=== Gastronomy ===
The pasty is one of the most typical gastronomic elements of the Comarca Minera, it is a legacy of the migration that arrived in the middle of the 19th century from the English Cornwall county. Traditional pasties are made of potato and meat, although a wide variety of fillings has been popularized. Other traditional dishes are pork carnitas, barbacoa and mixiotes.

The consumption of insects and their larvae such as the maguey worm (Aegiale hesperiaris), escamol (Liometopum apiculatum) and chinicuil (Comadia redtenbacheri) is a custom with pre-Columbian roots in various municipalities of Hidalgo, including those that make up the geopark territory. Thanks to their richness in highly digestible proteins, insects, coming from both the terrestrial and aquatic environment, have constituted and constitute today a food of high nutritional value in the Comarca Minera.

The Gastronomic Route of Pachuquilla, municipal seat of Mineral de la Reforma, is an exponent of the intangible heritage of the Comarca Minera Geopark. The gastronomic tradition of Pachuquilla dates back to 1917, the year in which the sale of prepared foods began. The gastronomic vocation of the locality was consolidated thanks to the construction of the Pachuca-Tuxpan highway in 1930, to the change of headquarters of the municipal seat in 1958, and finally, to the closure of some mines of the district of Pachuca-Real del Monte. With these changes, the number of diners who went there was increased.

== Administration ==
=== Inclusion in the geoparks network ===
The Comarca Minera was included in the Global Geoparks Network on May 5, 2017, when it was recognized as geopark of the UNESCO. On May 26, 2017, in the Achoma District, Peru, the Comarca Minera together with three more geoparks (Araripe, Brazil; Grutas del Palacio, Uruguay; Mixteca Alta, Mexico) founded the UNESCO Global Geoparks Network of Latin America and the Caribbean – Red GeoLAC – which in 2020 has 7 members. The first meeting of the Red GeoLAC took place in the Comarca Minera (in Mineral del Chico) in January 2018.

=== Institutions ===
In the process of candidacy, consolidation and promotion of the Comarca Minera Geopark, numerous educational and governmental institutions and dependencies have participated, mainly: Universidad Nacional Autónoma de México, through the Centro de Ciencias de la Atmósfera, Instituto de Geofísica, Instituto de Geología and Secretaría de Desarrollo Institucional; Universidad Autónoma del Estado de Hidalgo; Universidad La Salle Pachuca; the Hidalgo government, through the Consejo de Ciencia, Tecnología e Innovación de Hidalgo, Secretaría de Turismo, Unidad de Planeación y Prospectiva and the Instituto de Capacitación Para el Trabajo del Estado de Hidalgo; the geopark municipalities governments; the Servicio Geológico Mexicano; and the Comité del Centro Turístico Prismas Basálticos.

== See also ==
- Real Del Monte
- La Comarca Minera (Es)
