= Tillandsia violacea =

Scientific classification
- Kingdom: Plantae
- Clade: Tracheophytes
- Clade: Angiosperms
- Clade: Monocots
- Clade: Commelinids
- Order: Poales
- Family: Bromeliaceae
- Genus: Tillandsia
- Subgenus: Tillandsia subg. Tillandsia
- Species: T. violacea

Binomial name
- Tillandsia violacea Baker

Synonyms
- Anoplophytum violaceum (Baker) Beer; Platystachys violacea Beer

Species of plant

Tillandsia violacea is a species of epiphytic flowering plant in the family Bromeliaceae. It is endemic to Mexico, particularly to the Central Mexican Plateau. This species' habitat is at elevations between 600 and 3,100 meters, and is epiphytic to large trees in humid temperate forests, primarily the species Abies religiosa, Quercus rugosa, and Quercus laurina. In particular, it is a common epiphyte of the temperate pine forests of Hidalgo state, including El Chico National Park. Its range extends to the states of Guerrero, Jalisco, state of Mexico, Michoacán, Morelos, Oaxaca, and Veracruz. Due to its high-elevation habitat, this bromeliad species has tolerance to sub-freezing conditions.
