= Barranca de Metztitlán =

Barranca de Metztitlán Biosphere Reserve
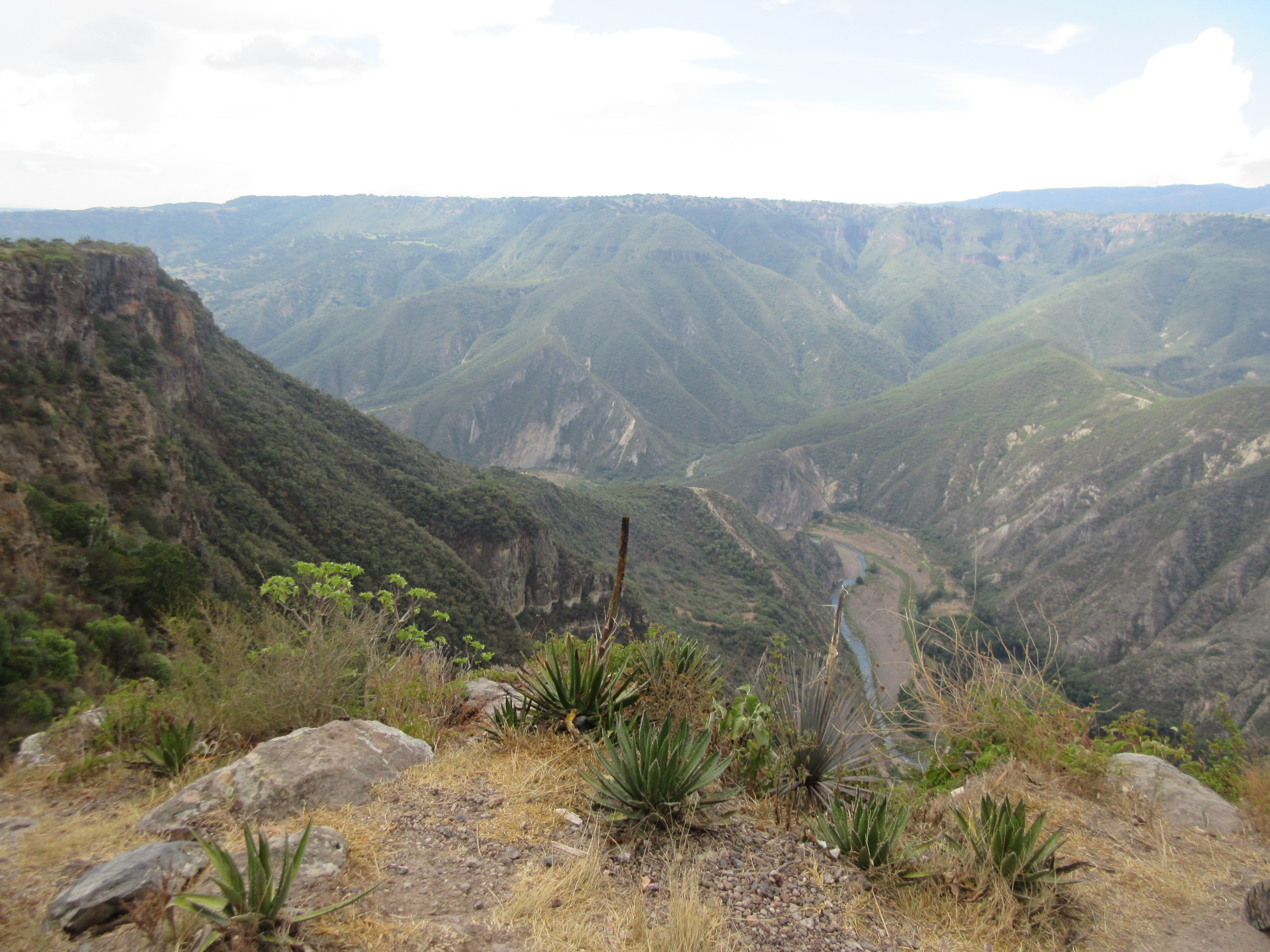
- Peña del Aire near Huasca de Ocampo, Hidalgo

- Location within Hidalgo Location within Mexico
- Location: Hidalgo, Mexico
- Coordinates: 20°40′N 98°52′W
- Area: 960.43 km^{2} (370.82 sq mi)
- Designation: UNESCO-MAB Biosphere Reserve
- Designated: 2006
- Administrator: National Commission of Natural Protected Areas

Ramsar Wetland
- Official name: Laguna de Metztitlán
- Designated: 2 February 2004
- Reference no.: 1934

Barranca de Metztitlán is a biosphere reserve in the Mexican state of Hidalgo. It is protected for its dramatic scenery of steep cliffs and deep winding canyons, and its distinctive flora and fauna.

== Geography ==
The reserve includes the deep and narrow barranca, or canyon, of the Metztitlán River, also known as the Venados River. The barranca is located on a semi-arid plateau which lies between the Sierra Madre Oriental to the east and the Sierra de Pachuca to the west. The Metztitlán River flows generally north–northwest. It is part of the Panuco River system, which drains into the Gulf of Mexico.

The reserve has an area of 960.43 km^{2}. It lies in the municipalities of Acatlán, Atotonilco El Grande, Eloxochitlán, Huasca de Ocampo, Metztitlán, San Agustín Metzquititlán, Metepec, Zacualtipán, and Cardonal.

The canyon floor is 1200 to 1300 meters elevation, while the Sierra Madre Oriental to the east and northeast reaches 1800 to 2600 meters elevation.

The Laguna de Metztitlán is a lake formed when a large landslide blocked the course of the Metztitlán River, creating a natural dam. The lake covers 700 ha and has an average depth of 9 to 10 meters. The area of the lake can increase to 5000 ha during periods of heavy rainfall.

== Flora and fauna ==
The reserve has a variety of plant communities, including xerophilous scrub, submontane scrub, tropical dry deciduous forest, pine–oak forest, pine forest, and juniper woodland. The reserve is rich in biodiversity, and many endemic plants and animals.

== Conservation ==
The Barranca de Metztitlán was designated a national biosphere reserve on 27 November 2000 by presidential decree. It was declared an international biosphere reserve in 2009 by UNESCO. Laguna de Metztitlán was declared a Ramsar Site in 2004.
