= Huasca =

For Huasca, see:

- Huasca de Ocampo, town in the Mexican state of Hidalgo, seat of the Municipality of Huasca de Ocampo
- Ayahuasca, psychoactive concoction prepared from the Amazonian vine Banisteriopsis caapi

== See also ==
- Huesca
