= El Chico National Park =

National park in Hidalgo State, Mexico

- IUCN category II (national park)
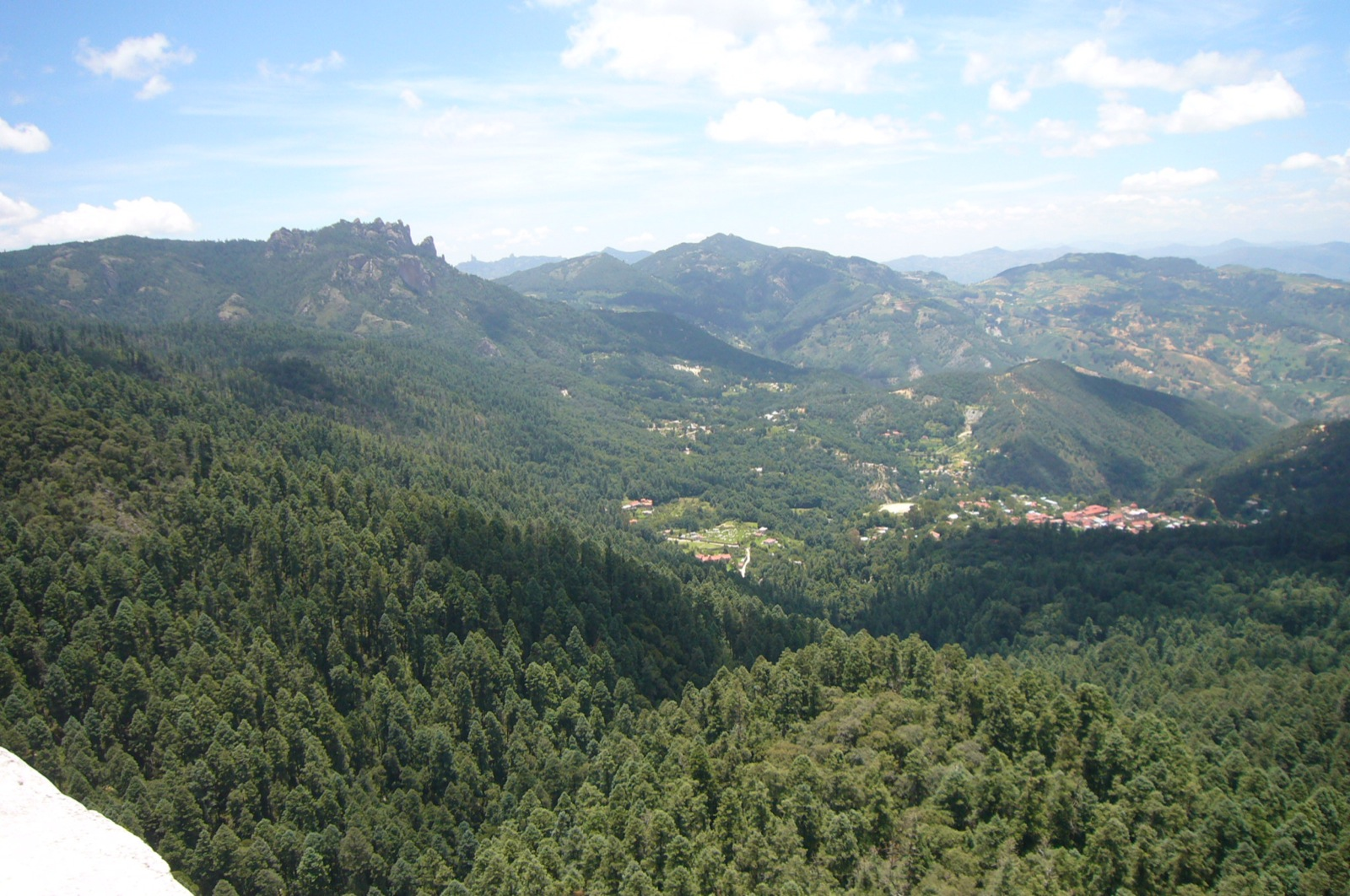
- Panorama of El Chico National Park

- Location within Mexico
- Nearest city: Pachuca
- Coordinates: 20°11′51″N 98°42′58″W
- Area: 27.39 km^{2} (10.58 sq mi)
- Designation: National park
- Designated: 1982
- Administrator: National Commission of Natural Protected Areas

El Chico National Park is a protected area in the State of Hidalgo, Mexico. It is one of the oldest protected areas in Mexico, as its foundation dates to 1898 when the then president of the republic, General Porfirio Díaz, by decree, created "Monte Vedado del Mineral del Chico". Since this date, the ancient conifer forests have been protected from the deforestation suffered in other parts of the country. Another decree followed in 1915 and still another by Presidential Agreement on 13 September 1922, which declared Monte Vedado to be cataloged as a forest reservation.

The park has an extensive and varied ecosystem typical of the region. It contains large forests of conifers, several species of animals.

== Decree ==
El Chico National Park was created by means of an official decree issued on 6 July 1982. It has a surface area of 2,739 hectares (6,770 acres), and is located in the Pachuca Mountains, Hidalgo.

== Orography ==
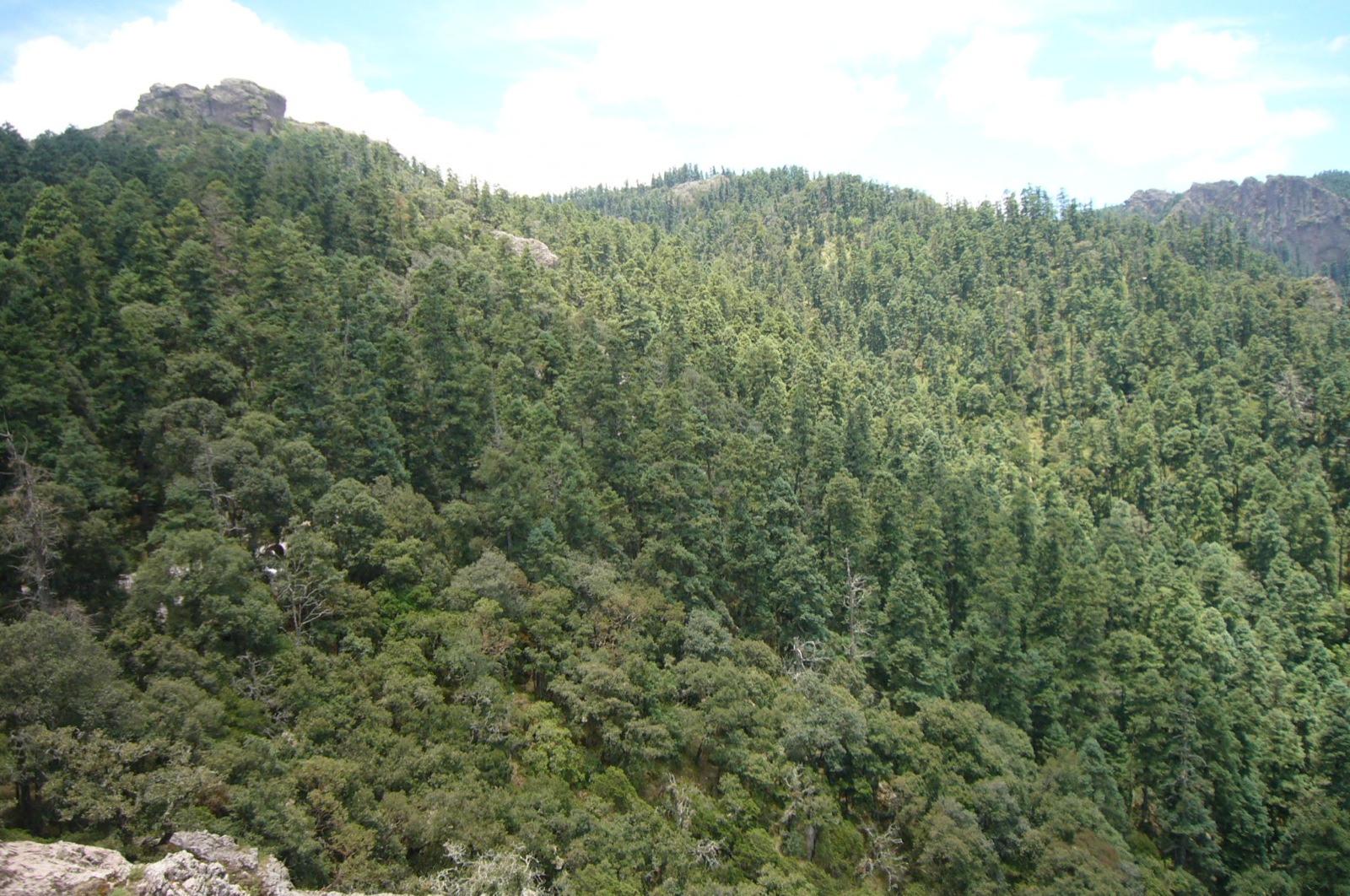
Vista of the mass boscosa of the national park.

The highland zone is in the Pachuca Mountain range. It is of volcanic origin and its limits split it north of the Valley of Mexico. This range is a southwestern extension of the Sierra Madre Oriental where it meets the Trans-Mexican Volcanic Belt. Elevations range between 2,300–3,090 metres (7,550–10,140 ft) above sea level. The majority of these elevations feature rocky crags of volcanic origin that they are eroded by climate. The best known of these are Las Ventanas at 3,090 metres (10,140 ft), as well as Las Monjas, La Peña del Cuervo, La Peña del Sumate, La Muela, Los Enamorados, and La Fortaleza.

== Hydrography ==
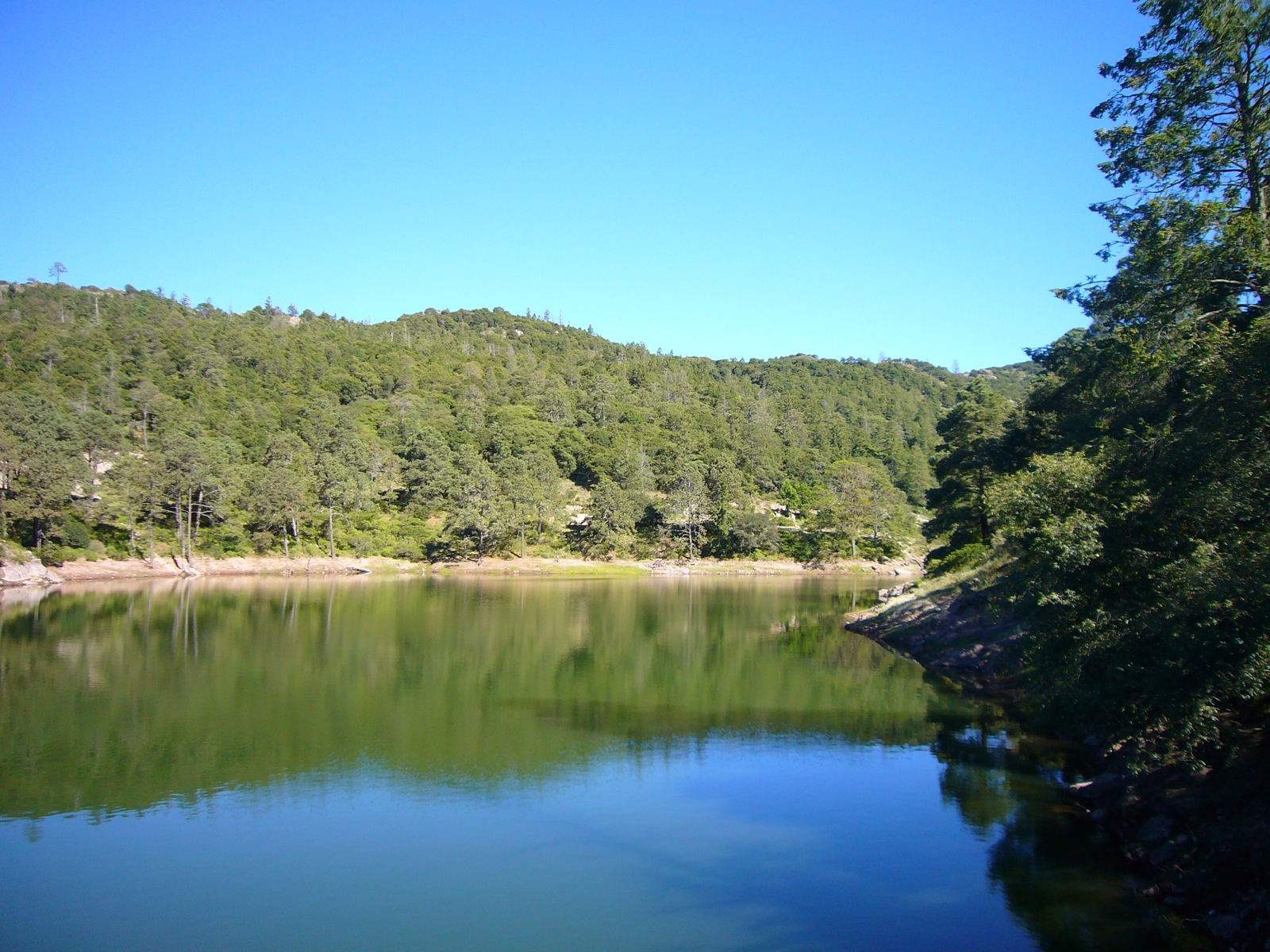
Vista of El Cedral.

In this highland zone, there are several springs which form rivers and tributaries, crossing the greater part of the park. There are waterfalls associated with Río el Milagro. The hydrological basin is that of the Pánuco River. Sportive fishing occurs at El Cedral.

== Flora and fauna ==
This forest presents one of the best ecosystems preserved in the zone that corresponds to the splits between the North and the Valley of Mexico. Vegetation is diverse, housing some endemic species and others that are not very abundant or predominate in the country, in particular the Cupressus which is not very common in the Mexican forests.

The following species of trees are present in the park: Pinus teocote and Pinus rudis; Abies (fir), particularly Abies religiosa; Quercus (oak), particularly Quercus laurina, Quercus affinis, Quercus rugosa, and Quercus mexicana. Of Cupressus, Cupressus lusitanica and Cupressus benthamii are featured. The juniper Juniperus monticola forms thickets.

A total of 17 species have been categorized for special protection under the agreement NOM-59-SEMARNAT-2001).

== Recreation ==
The visitor center and park office offer tourist information, a cafeteria, an audiovisual area, and an exhibition space. Additionally, there is a tower equipped for forest fire detection and surveillance. Accommodations include the Alpine Hostel “Miguel Hidalgo”, a trailer park, and the Oriel “Crag of the Raven”. Two low-impact ecotourism campsites are also available in the area.
