= Huasca de Ocampo =

Huasca
- Town & Municipality
- Huasca de Ocampo
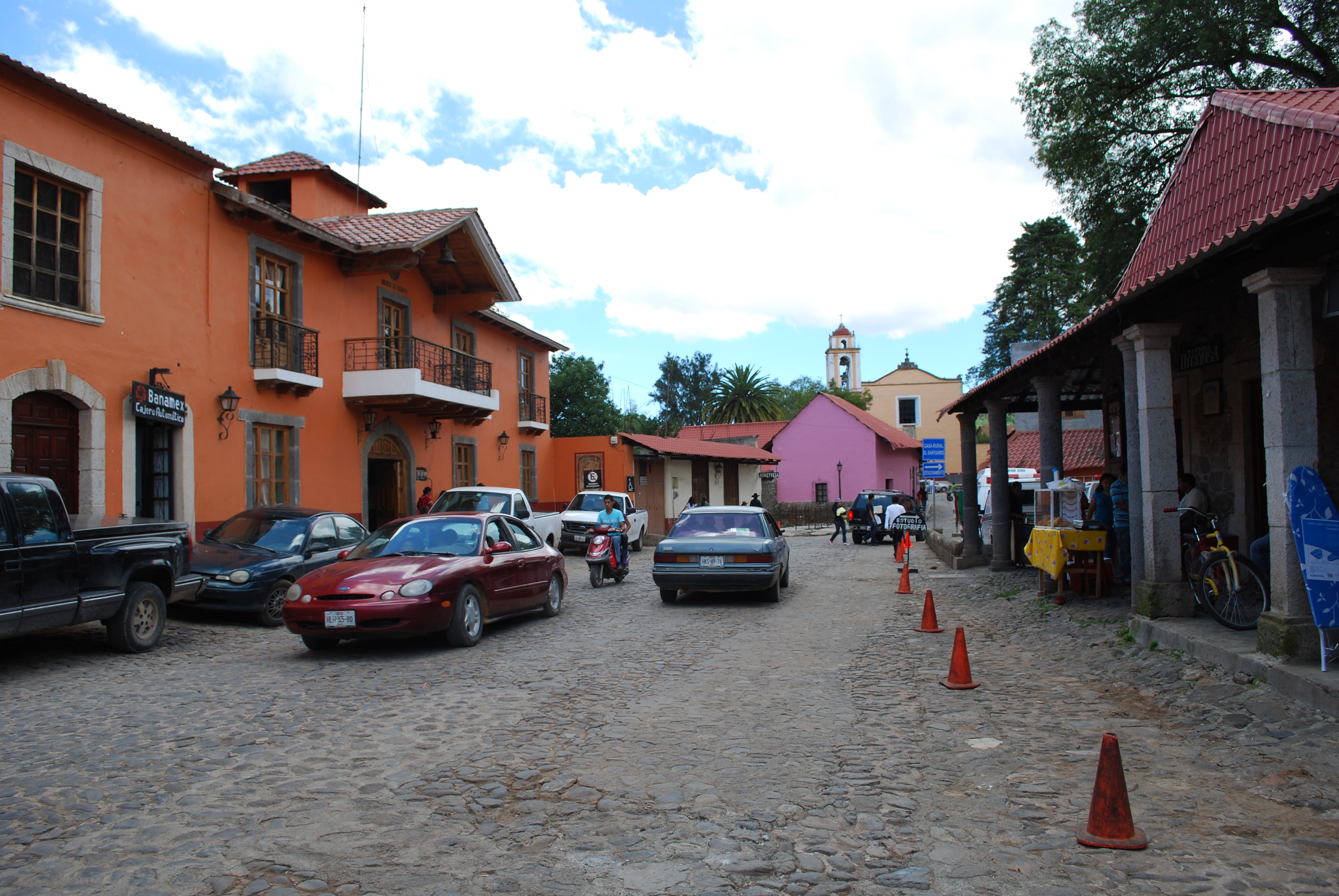
- Streetview looking towards parish church

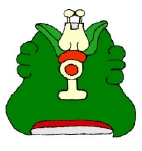
- Coat of arms

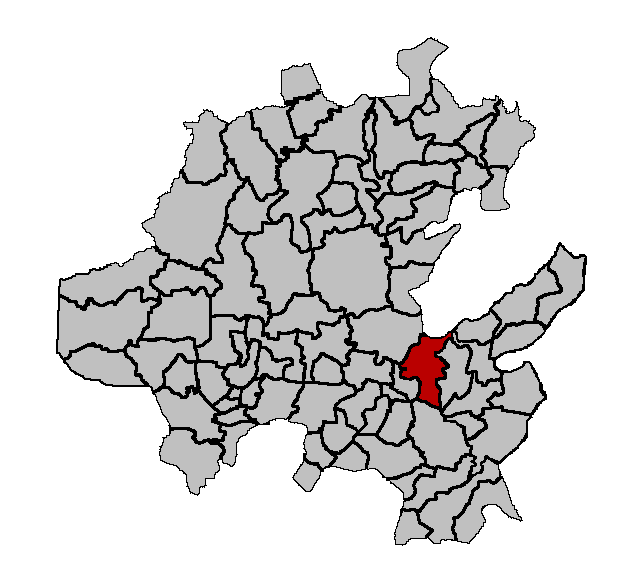
- Location of the municipality of Huasca de Ocampo in Hidalgo.

- Location within Mexico
- Coordinates: 20°12′10″N 98°34′33″W
- Country: Mexico
- State: Hidalgo
- Founded: 18th century
- Municipal Status: 1864

Government
  - Municipal President: Álvaro López Vaca
  - Federal electoral district: Hidalgo's 3rd
- Elevation (of seat): 2,100 m (6,900 ft)

Population (2005) Municipality
  - Municipality: 15,201
  - Seat: 543
- Time zone: UTC-6 (Zona Centro)
- Postal code (of seat): 43503
- Website: huascapueblomagico.gob.mx

Huasca de Ocampo (Spanish: ['waska ðe o'kampo]) is a town and municipality of the state of Hidalgo in central Mexico. It is located 34 km from Pachuca and 16 km from Real del Monte in the Pachuca Mountains. While the town itself is just within the mountain range, much of the municipal land is located in a valley that opens up to the east of the town. While one of the first haciendas to be established in Mexico is located here, economic development started with mining haciendas built by Pedro Romero de Terreros in the 18th century. By the mid 20th century, none of these haciendas were in existence, having been broken up into communal farm lands (ejido) and some even fully or partially under lakes created by dams. While agriculture remains important economically, the area has been promoted as a tourism destination, especially for weekend visitors from Mexico City, with attractions such as canyons, traditional houses, old hacienda facilities and waterfalls.

== Etymology ==
The original name for the area was "Huascazaloya." This come from Nahuatl and has three possible meanings. The first and most probable means "place of happiness and abundance." The second derives from a phrase that means "place of water." The third comes from a phrase that means "place where they make precious cotton shawls (mantas)." The appendage "de Ocampo" was adopted in honor of Melchor Ocampo, who lived briefly here in the mid 19th century.

== History ==
First records of the area extend only as far as the early colonial period. The area came under the encomienda of the Diego de Paz family, who were centered in Atotonilco el Grande starting in 1558. Small villages such as San Sebastian and San Bartolomé are mentioned in early records but not the municipal seat of Huasca. In the late 16th century, the area was acknowledged as an "Indian Republic," meaning that the natives here had a certain amount of autonomy from the Spanish. By the 17th century, the encomienda was broken up and the lands around the Indian republic became haciendas.

The town of Huasca became established between the 1760s and 1780s as Pedro Romero de Terreros, the first Count of Regla, developed mining here. The mines he established along with earlier ones in Pachuca and Real del Monte made him the richest man in the world at the time. Romero established four major mining haciendas here, with the largest being San Miguel Regla and Santa Maria Regla. At their height, these haciendas employed thousands of workers, first to build them then to operate them. This would end after this count's death in 1781 due to poor management. By 1810, the production of the mines here, in Pachuca and in Real del Monte fell almost 80%. Lands were rented out and the raising of cattle grew in importance. However, since the renters had no vested interest in maintaining the properties, overgrazing and other ecological damage would ruin this aspect of the economy as well. By the mid 19th century, many of the granaries and other buildings lay in ruins. This prompted mass migration out of the area.

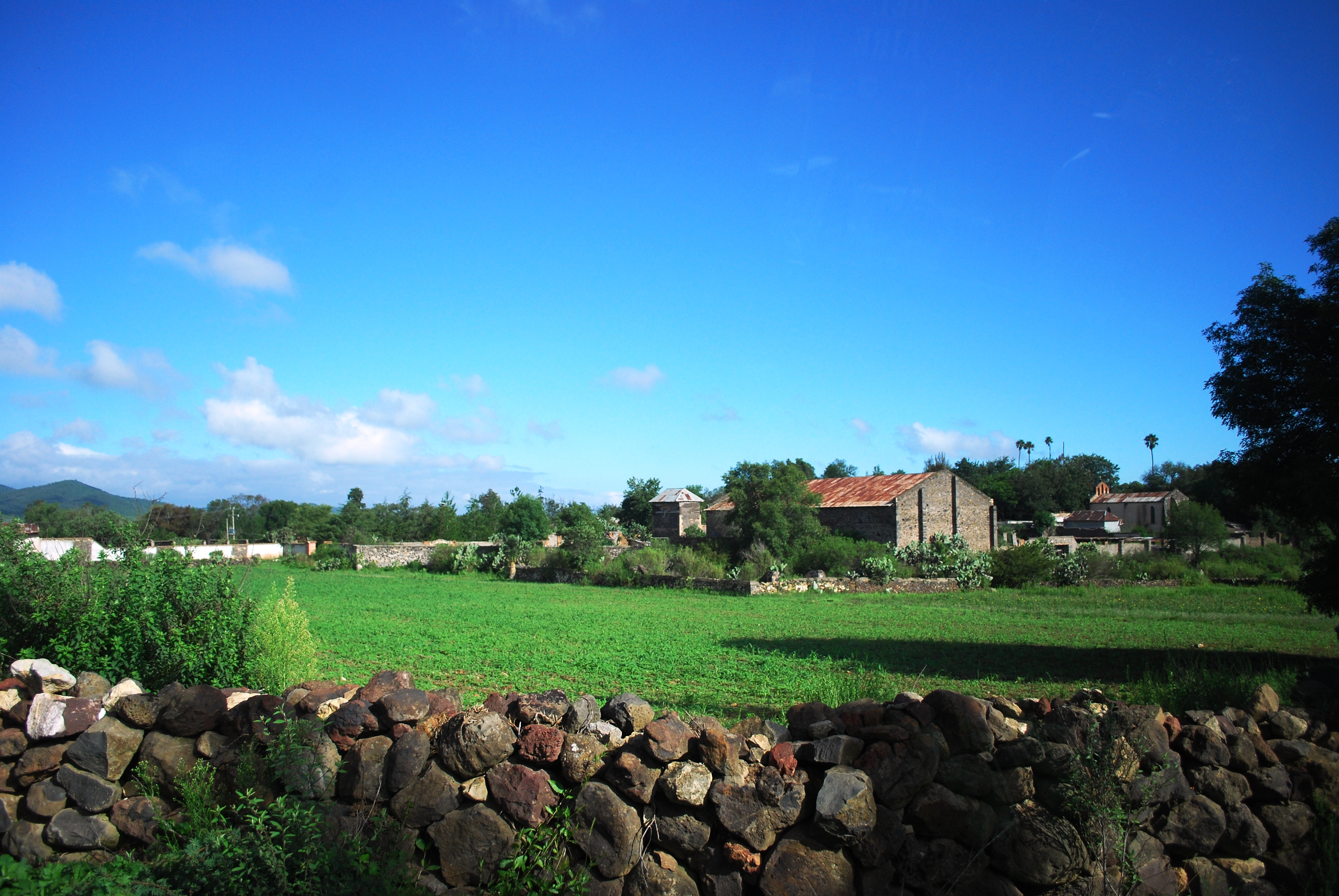
View of the San Juan Hueyapan Hacienda

Since that time, agriculture has continued to be the mainstay economically. The large haciendas of the area were broken up, with much of the land becoming ejidos, or lands held in common by rural communities. By the latter part of the 20th century, the main buildings of Santa Maria Regla and San Miguel Regla were converted into luxury hotels and resorts. The San Antonio Hacienda is almost completely underwater due to one of the many dams that have been constructed here in the 20th century to store water and to provide electricity.

No major indigenous communities remain with only 64 people speaking an indigenous language as of the 2005 census.

In addition to agriculture, ecotourism has become a major aspect of the economy. Huasca de Ocampo was the first in Hidalgo state to become part of the federal Pueblos Mágicos (Magical Towns) tourism program, mostly because most of the town's old buildings remain and the pace of life has changed very little here since the first half of the 20th century.

However, the area's popularity tourist destination has led to property disputes between residents and those wishing to purchase or otherwise gain control of land here, especially around the old Santa María Regla hacienda. Government authorities have pressured about twenty families to sell, and there is pressure from banks which hold outstanding loans on other properties. Some have been threatened with eviction but court orders have prevented this so far. Many of the families have lived on these lands for over 200 years. Attempts to take the land had been tried since the 1970s, but have intensified recently.

== The town ==
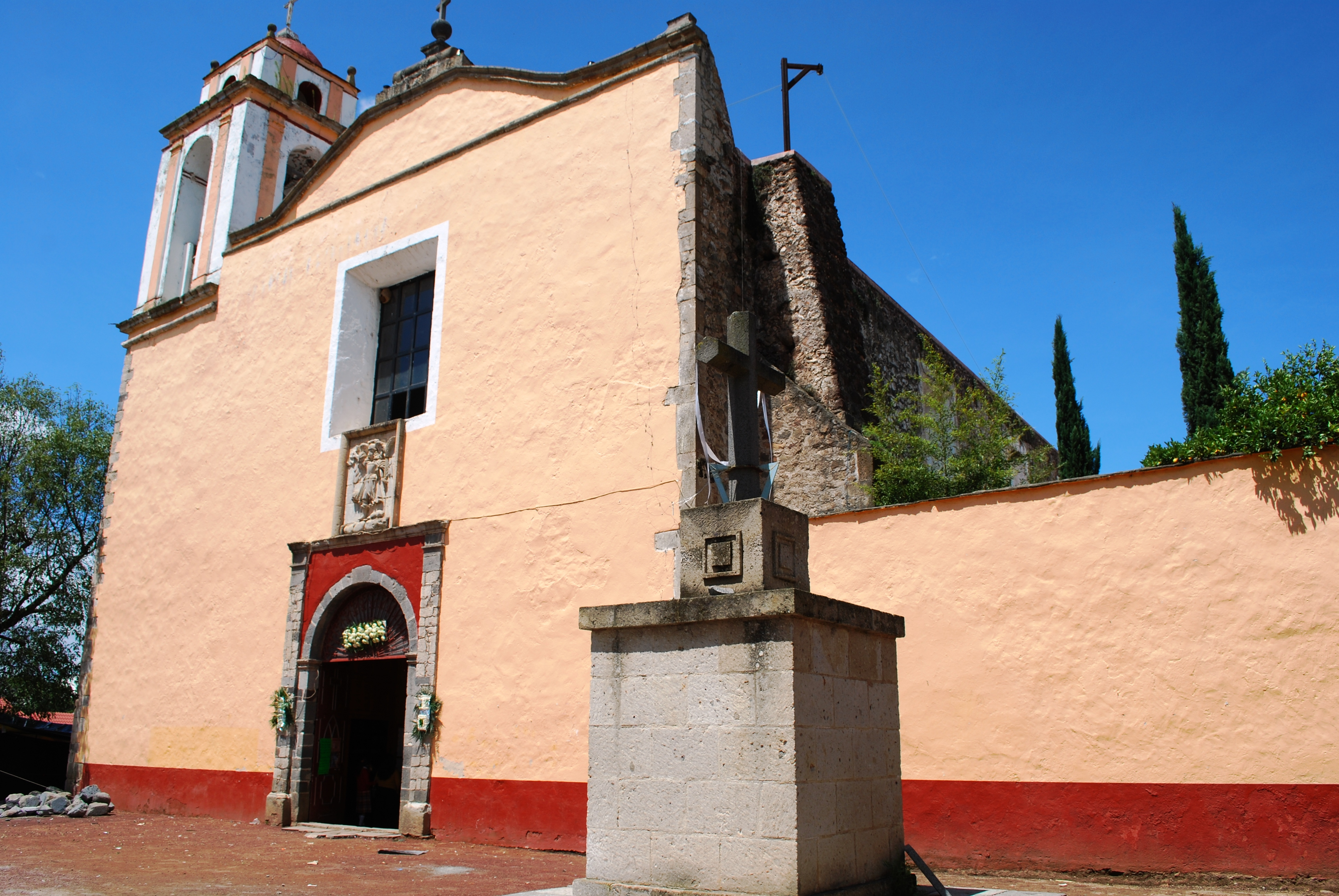
San Juan Bautista Church

The town of Huasca de Ocampo is set just inside the northeast edge of the Sierra de Pachuca where the meet the west end of the valley of Tulancingo. The town is surrounded by low forested peaks. Upon exiting the town towards the east, the landscape opens out into the valley. The center of town is narrow filled with houses and other buildings made with white sandstone and topped with pitched roofs covered in red laminate (metal or plastic) or red clay tile. The walls are thick and large chunks of stone can be seen held together with mortar. This is common in the older mining areas of Hidalgo where rain is frequent. (tradition) Some of the structures are decorated with smooth river stones and many of the storefronts and other buildings on the main roads have accents done in rough hewn wood with the bark still attached. The streets of the town are paved with stone and there are few to no streetlights at night.

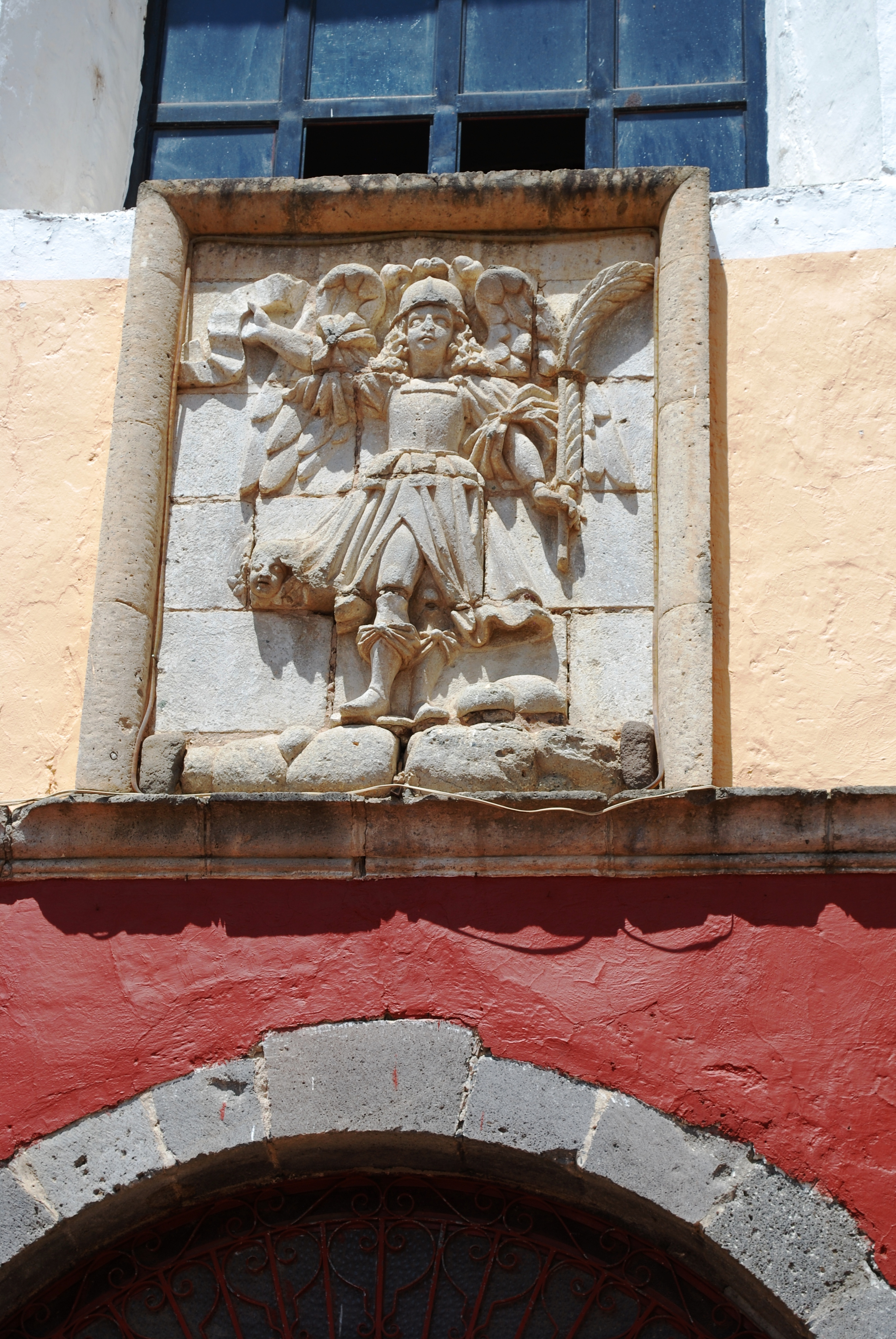
Image of the Archangel Michael above the main portal

In the center of the town is the main parish church. Many think the church is dedicated to the Archangel Michael, mostly due to the relief carving above the main portal, but in reality it is dedicated to John the Baptist. This church was founded in the first half of the 16th century by Augustinians from the monastery in Atotonilco el Grande. The relief over the main portal was donated by Pedro de Terreros who was a devotee of the archangel. The side altars inside are made of wood and are assumed to be from the 18th century. One is Baroque in style but is missing columns. It contains a large painting of the Archangel Michael depicted with two Franciscan saints helping souls trapped in Purgatory. The other side altars are more traditionally Baroque in style.

The town is noted for its pottery, made with the local red clay. Most of the pieces are everyday wares such as jars, plates and cups. These are mostly sold at the weekly market or tianguis. The best known artisans in the town are Jesús Chavez Centeno and Luis Escorz who have their shops in the portals north of the main church. Other crafts include hats, caps, molcajetes made with volcanic stone, furniture, wrought iron, objects made from obsidian and rompope. The Casa de Cultura is to the south of the main church which also sells local crafts.

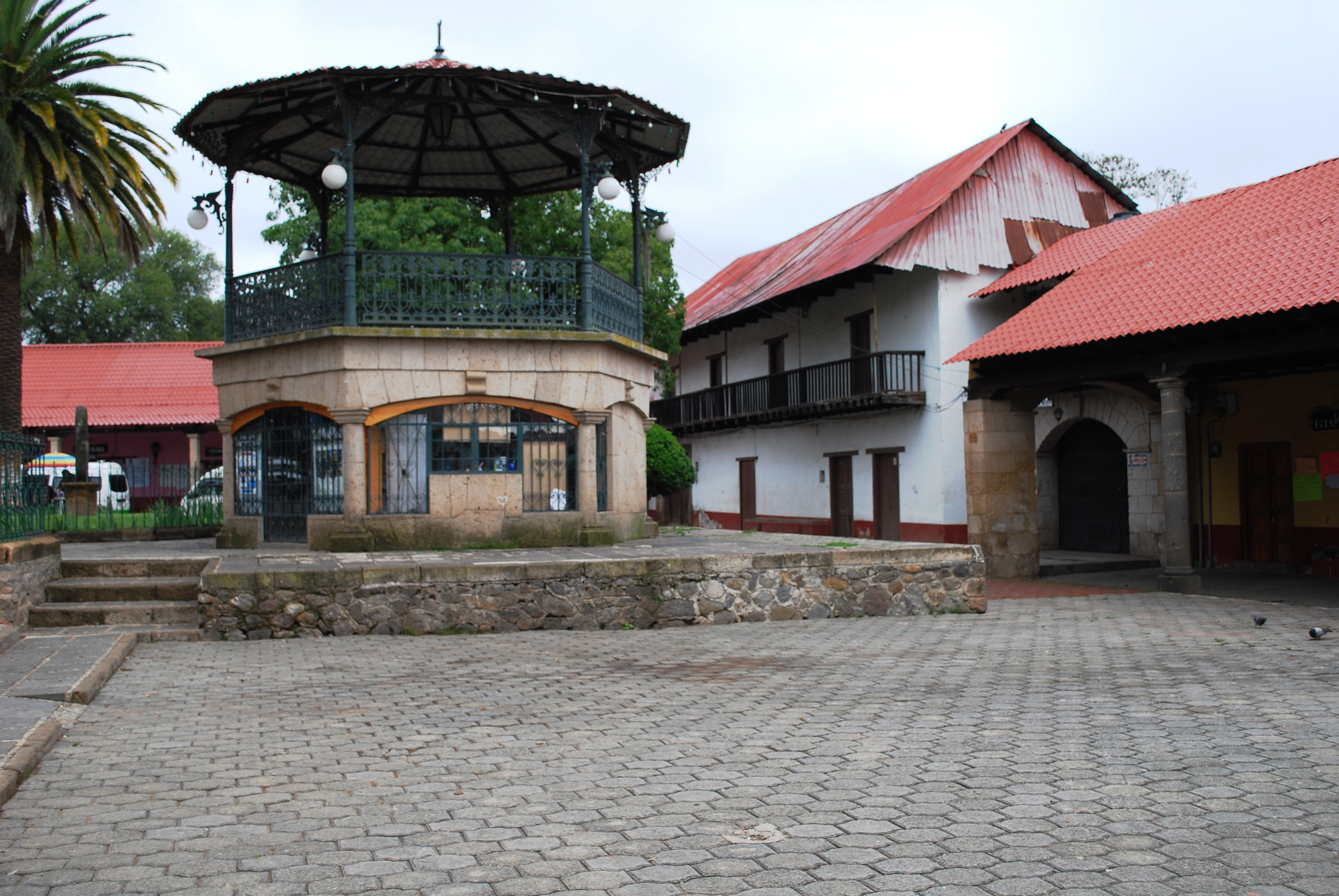
Kiosk and buildings around it in the center of town

Market day for the town is Monday, when vendors set up stands all along the main street through town, mostly to sell locally needed products. At the market and in the restaurants traditional dishes such as baked trout, cecina, barbacoa, pastes, quesadillas with huitlacoche, pulque bread and fruit wines are available. Specialty dishes such as chinicuiles, escamoles chichas de maguey and dishes made with local wild mushrooms are available in season.

Near the town there is a possible pre-Hispanic site, with evidence of a former pyramid. The town has over fifteen inns and hotels.

The festival of John the Baptist takes place on 24 June of each year. The event is celebrated with masses, charreadas, horse racing, cockfights, sporting events, fireworks, folk dancing and more. Another important annual event is the feast day of the Virgin of Guadalupe. On these occasions, it is possible to see traditional dress such as pants and shirts made of manta (natural cotton cloth) which have been embroidered in bright colors.

== The municipality ==
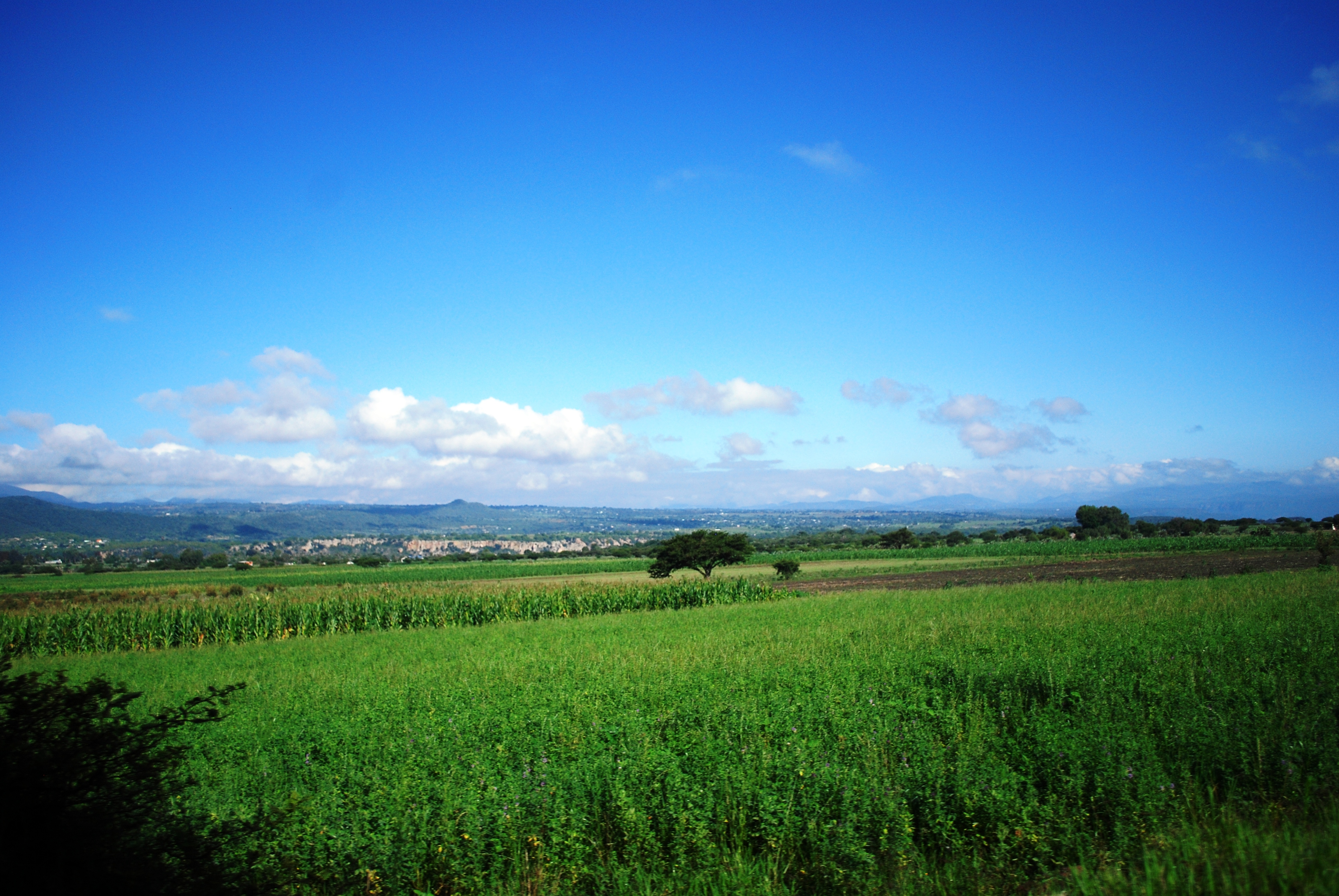
View of part of the valley area in the municipality

Although the town of Huasca de Ocampo is governmental authority for the entire municipality, only a small percentage of the municipality's population of 15,201 (2005) lives in the town proper. The rest live in the 80+ other communities, which together form a territory of 305.80 km^{2} (118.07 sq mi). The municipality borders the municipalities of Tulancingo, Omitlán de Juárez, Acatlán and Atotonilco. To the north, it borders the state of Veracruz.

The municipality extends from the Sierra de Pachuca mountains, where the town is, to over part of a wide, flat valley with lower altitude and warmer temperatures. This area is filled with small towns and villages, as well as fields and orchards. The higher elevations around these flat lands are forested with holm oak which give them an ashy-green look. The altitude of the municipality varies from between 1,800 and 2,800 masl. The municipality is part of the Reserva de la Biosfera de la Vega de Meztitlán (Vega de Meztitlán Biosphere Reserve). About 70% of the municipality lies on the Trans-Mexican Volcanic Belt although there are no active volcanoes here.

About 3,300 hectares is forest, almost all of which is in the Sierra de Pachuca Mountains which surround the town. Major elevations include Cerro Grande, Las Navajas, La Piedra de Jacal, El Horcón and La Peña del Aguila. There are numerous small canyons and ravines, jagged mountainsides which extend far below the peaks. One peak which gives an extended view of the municipality and beyond is called Los Pelados.

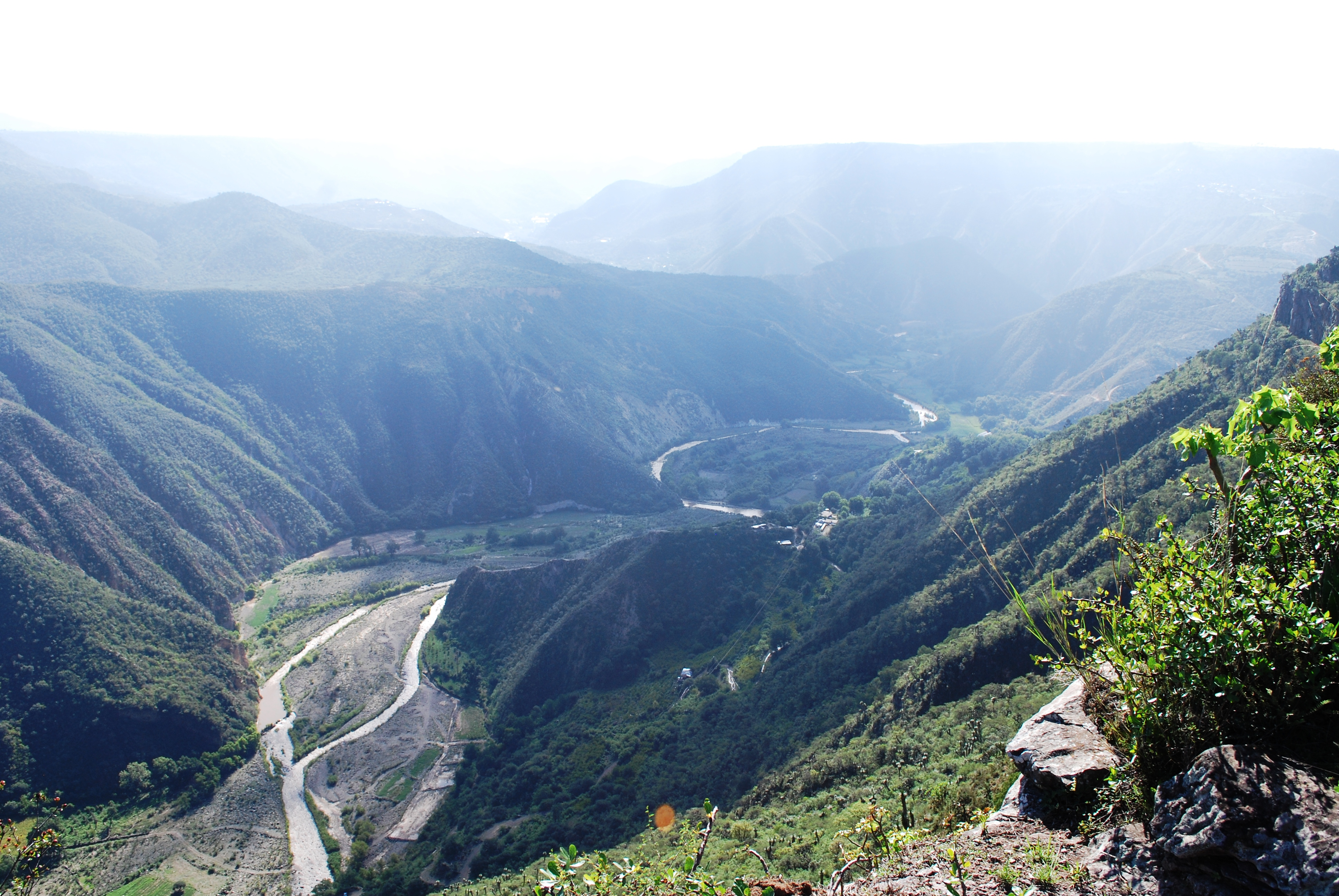
Canyon with Hueyapan River below

The municipality is divided between the basins of the Panuco and Moctezuma Rivers. The area is filled with small rivers, streams and arroyos, which almost always run north-south. The largest of the rivers are the Huascazaloya, Iztla, Hueypan and San Jeronimo. These rivers and streams feed 87 natural and dammed bodies of water, which vary in size from a few meters wide a couple of kilometers. The best known dam in the areas is the San Antonio Regla dam. Water from this dam is used primarily for agricultural irrigation. The major fresh water spring is called Ojo de Agua, which is surrounded by large willow and other trees.

The rivers and streams of the area have cut deep narrow ravines and canyons into much of the municipality. The largest of these is the San Sebastian Canyon, which is part of the Metztitlán Canyon system.

The climate is temperate to mildly cold with an average annual temperature of 15C. Winter gets cold enough to need a warm jacket, especially at night.

There various vegetation here. Most tree species such as pine and holm oak are found in the higher elevations. The flat areas are mostly grass and farmland with scattered trees such as willows and laurels. Wildlife is limited to small mammals such as badgers, squirrels, foxes and moles. Other species include birds such as eagles and reptiles such as chameleons.

== Economy ==
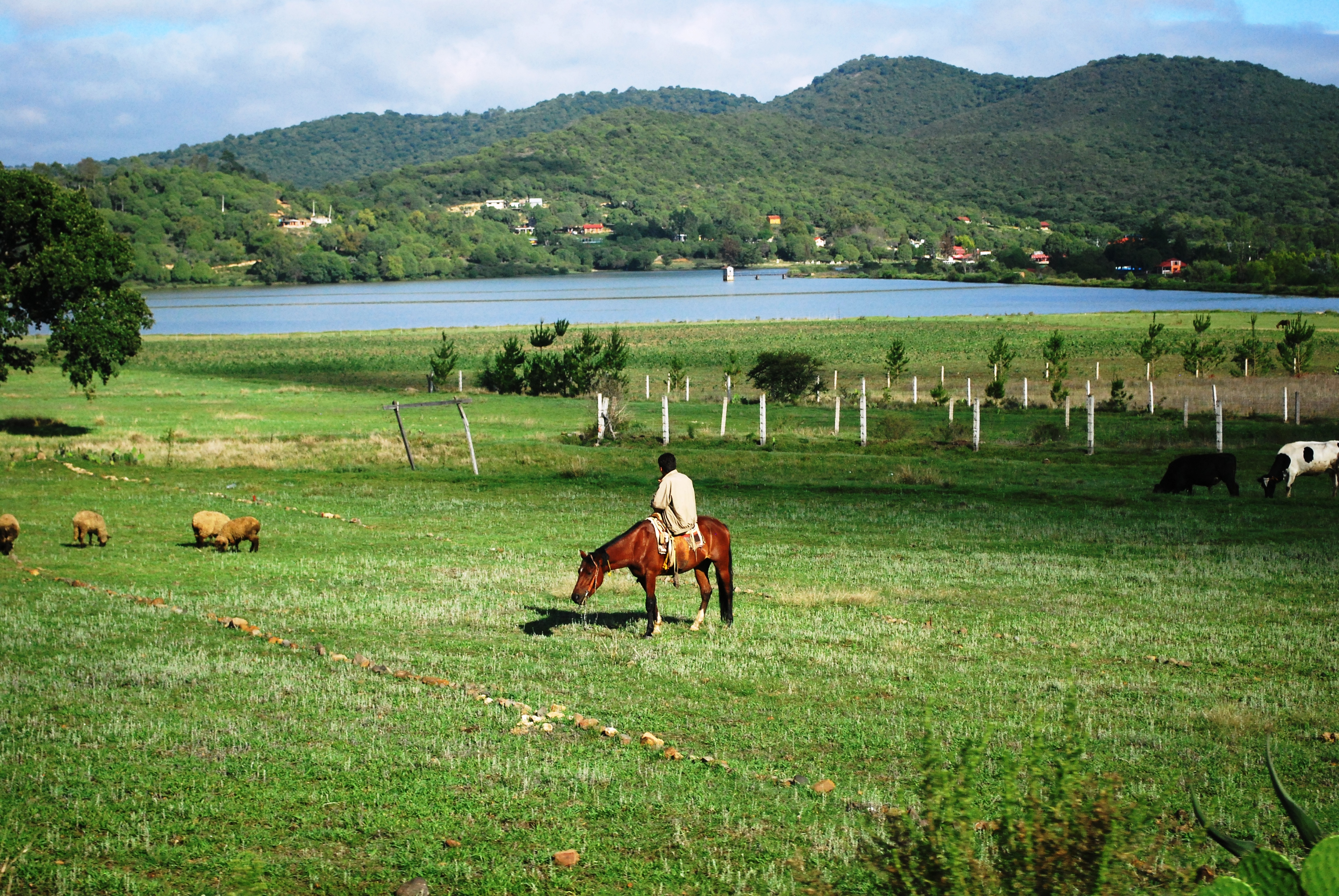
Man on horse by San Antonio Dam

Historically, the most important economic activities here have been mining and agriculture. Mining no longer has the importance it once did, but agriculture remains important, employing over 37% of the municipality's population. There are over 3,000 units of production that occupy over 17,000 hectares of land. Over 9,000 of this are dedicated to crops, with about 4,000 as pasture. By far the most important crop is corn, producing over 14,000 tons. Next in importance are animal feed, beans, wheat and alfalfa. Fruit orchards can also be found. Domesticated livestock includes fowl, sheep, goats, pigs turkeys, cows, horses and bees. The most common are sheep, cows and goats.

As of 1993, there were only nine industrial enterprises in the municipality, employing fifteen people. Products include processed foods, drinks and animal feed. Manufacturing, construction and mining employ 28.1% of the population.

Commerce consists of tourism and those devoted to goods and services for the local population. This employs about 35% of the population. This is the portion of the economy which has been promoted by state and local authorities.

== Tourism ==
The municipality is promoted by the Hidalgo state tourism authority as part of the Corredor de la Montaña, or Mountain Corridor. On the federal level, the town is promoted as a Pueblo Mágico or Magical Town, due to its preserved architecture and natural surroundings. These promotions have included reforestation and other reclamation projects to make the areas more attractive to tourists. Most of the area's visitors are from Mexico City, which is only 1 hour and 40 minutes away by car. Ecotourism and the local haciendas are the major draws, with activities related to the bodies of water, mountains and canyon areas. These include fishing, boating, hiking, horseback riding and more. The area's haciendas were mostly built by Pedro Romero de Terreros and they, along with other sites, have been used as sets for movies and television shows. Tours to most of the municipality's attractions run from the town of Huasca, especially on weekends.

=== Santa María Regla Hacienda ===
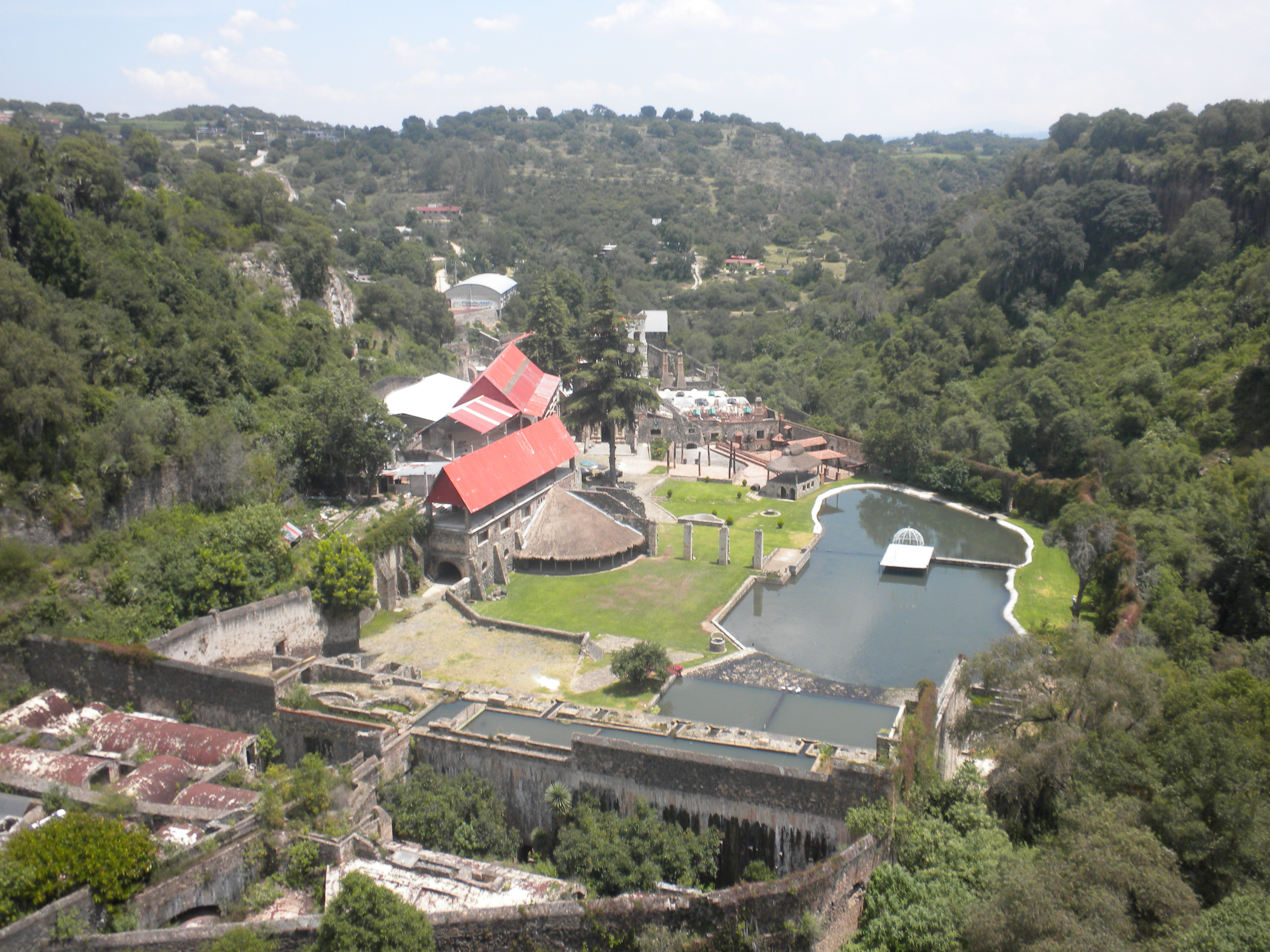
Overview of the Santa Maria Regla Hacienda

Terreros built four mining haciendas in this area, at a cost of two million pesos, an incredible sum at the time. About half of that money went towards the construction of Santa Maria Regla alone. Located four km from the town of Huasca, Construction began in 1762 as a silver operation. The name is from its dedication to the Virgin Mary as she was venerated in the town of Chipiona in the province of Cádiz, Spain, where Romero was from. Rocks extracted from mines were brought to the main facility to be crushed and treated with mercury to purify the silver. This process required large quantities of water which the local streams provided. Local forests provided the wood needed to melt the silver into bars. The hacienda extends over twelve hectares of land at the bottom of the canyon (very close to the Prismas Basálticas), and at its height, employed up to 2,000 workers.

This haciendas was Romero's residence in the area, where he died in 1781. Alexander von Humboldt visited Santa María Regla in 1803, making sketches of it, including the Prismas Basálticas which were part of the property at the time. His sketches and writings were published in Europe, and he is considered to be the first tourism promoter for the area. The original drawings are in the British Museum in London.

The main portal bears an image of the Archangel Michael with the inscription of "Quis ut Deus" (Who like God). A number of the original buildings have been preserved such as the main house, the smelting ovens, tunnels, aqueducts, storage facilities, the main patios with its arches and chapel. The chapel has a sober Baroque facade and the design is attributed to Antonio Rivas Mercado.

The hacienda was converted into a hotel in 1945, with the main residence as a luxury hotel. Much of the hacienda property is now underwater due to the damming of nearby stream. The facility offers picnic spaces, protected wildlife areas, restaurant, horseback riding, guided tours and ATV rentals. There are exhibits of old mining and smelting equipment, and the chapel can be rented for weddings and other occasions. It also has facilities for raising trout, which are available at the restaurant. The hacienda was used in the production of movies such as The Old Gringo, The Mask of Zorro and the Mexican film "Ave María" with Demián Bichir.

=== San Miguel Regla Hacienda ===
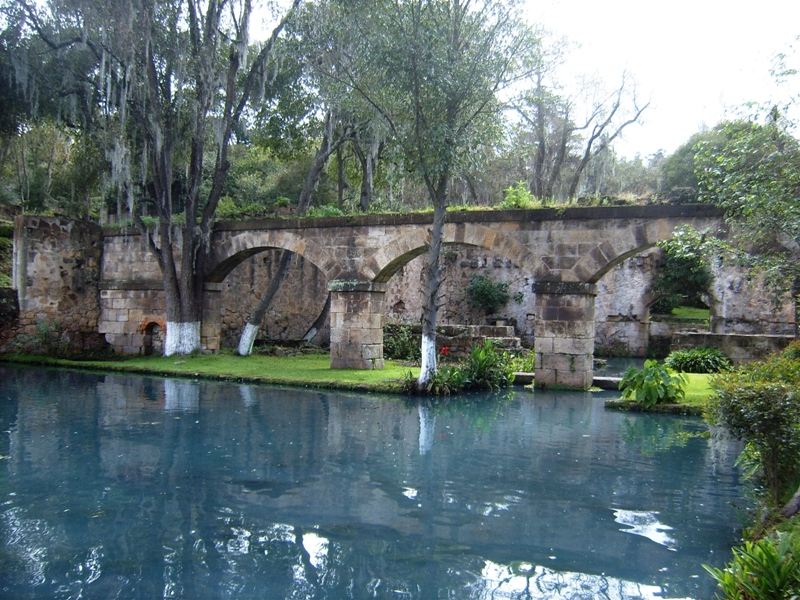
Santa Miguel Regla Hacienda

The other well-known hacienda of the area is San Miguel Regla, which is located just outside the town of Huasca, in a community also called San Miguel Regla. This hacienda was constructed by Romero in the 18th century and is also dedicated to mining. The hacienda conserves many of its structures such as the five-meter stone perimeter wall, arches of the main patios, the main house, the smelting ovens (now flooded), holding tanks for ore and the gardens. Much of the former property of San Miguel Regla is now ejido land, but the complex has been converted into a hotel and ecotourism park. The main house is a luxury hotel, with small villas constructed over the property connected by footpaths. The gardens of the area are maintained as they were in the 18th century, with a modern heated swimming pool added. Other offerings include a clay tennis court, bar, game room, videorental and a meeting hall that accommodates 160 people. The lake by this hacienda has walking paths, fountains and a Greek-style theatre.

=== Basaltic Prisms of Santa María Regla ===
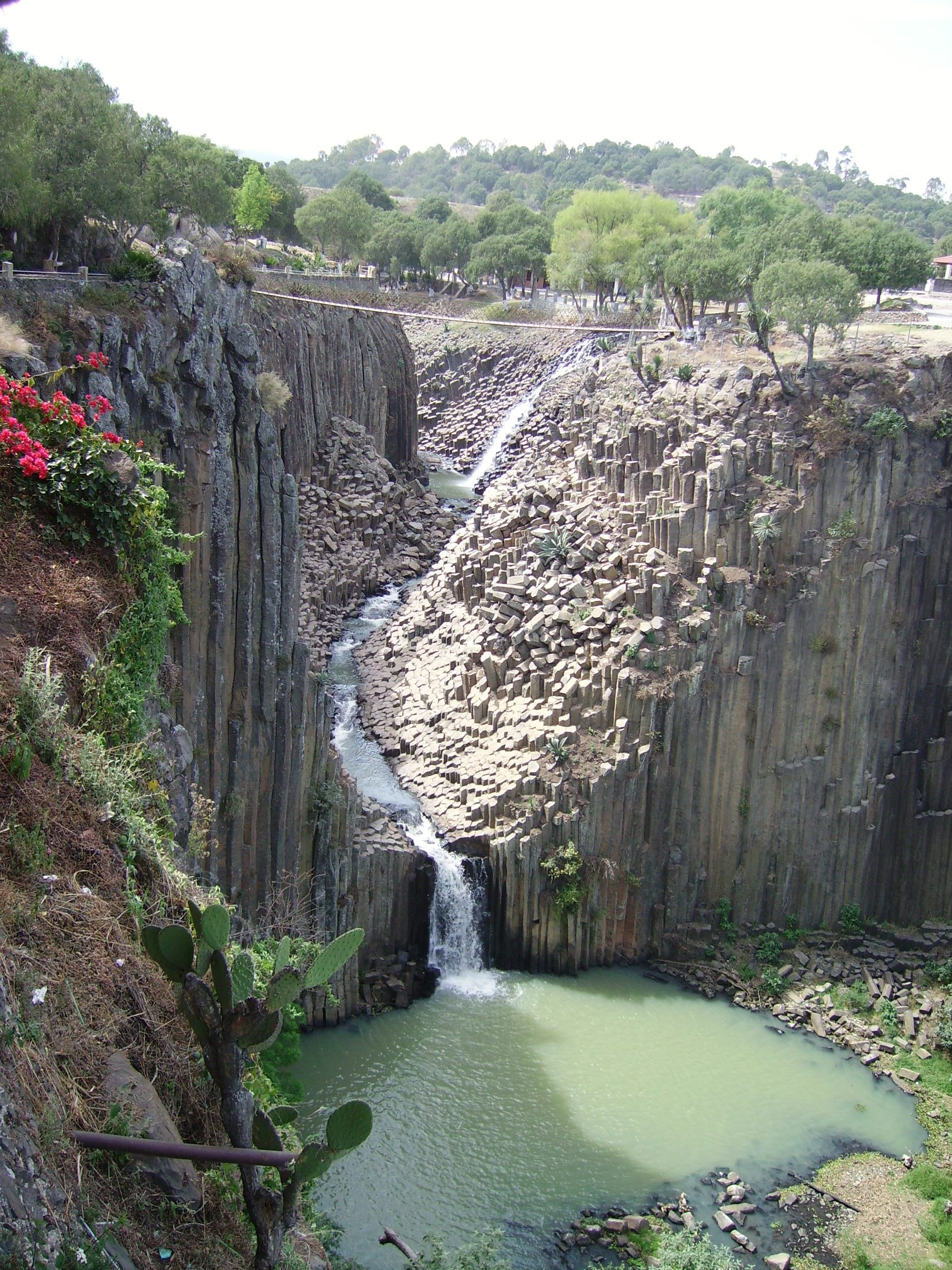
View of the Prismas Basálticos

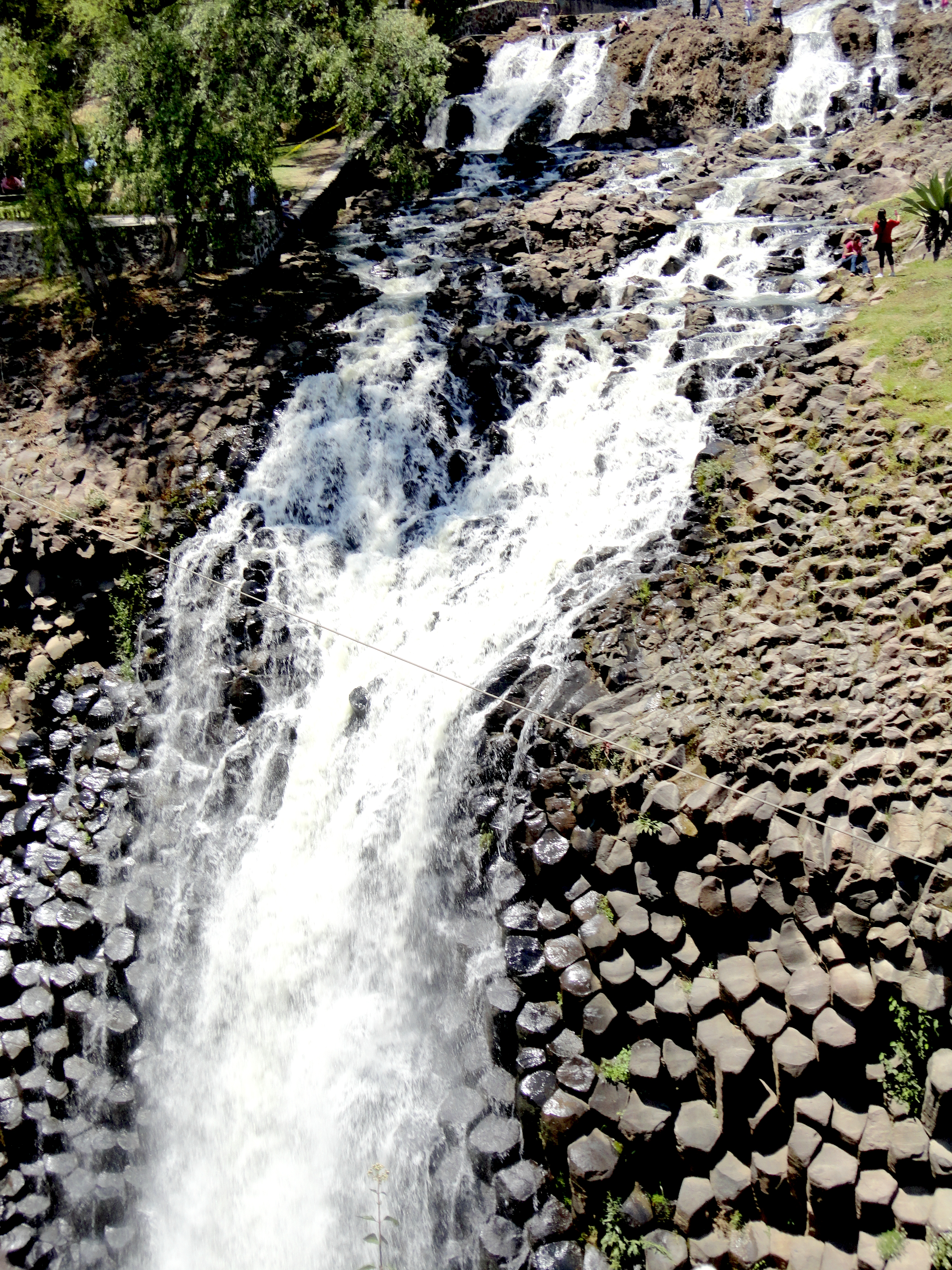
Waterfall

The Basaltic Prisms of Santa María Regla (Prismas basálticos de Santa María Regla in Spanish) are tall columns of basalt rock that line a ravine through which water runs from the San Antonio Dam. This ravine area was part of the Santa María Regla Hacienda and was first promoted by Alexander von Humboldt in 1803.

The walls of the canyon, called the Barranca de Alcholoya, are lined by polygonal columns between thirty and fifty meters high with five or six sides. The basalt columns were created by the slow cooling of volcanic lava. The visible columns are backed by even more polygonal basalt columns. There are two waterfalls. The higher one has its water supplemented by diversions from nearby dams. The lower one is called the Cascada de la Rosa. The canyon has been prepared by the addition of stairs, walkways and hanging bridges for easy access.

=== Other attractions ===
Two other important haciendas in the area are San Antonio Regla and San Juan Hueyapan. San Antonio Regla was built by Pedro Romero de Terrero as a mining facility. In the early 20th century, it was one of the more active facilities in the state. Today, however, the entire area is submerged due to the damming of the Huazcazaloya and Iztla Rivers by the San Antonio Dam, which provides electricity to Pachuca. All that can be seen is a large smokestack or chimney poking up out of the waters. This belonged to the refinery. The San Juan Hueyapan Hacienda was one of the first to be founded in Mexico and was dedicated to farming and livestock. It was constructed by a nephew of Hernán Cortés in 1535. It conserves its taverns, stables, and chapel.

El Zembo is located seven km from the center of Huasca in a small valley surrounded by high peaks and forests of holm oak and fir. It has a trout farm and various small rustic restaurants that prepare the fish in various ways. Visitors can buy a trout to have prepared or fish one from the property's lake.

The Parque de las Truchas or Trout Park (also called Bosque de las Truchas) was begun about ten years ago when 72 ejidos decided to construct a trout farm on their communal lands. Only twenty one remain with the project. The park offers fishing, canoeing, grills and horseback riding to visitors along with the sale of fish. The hatchery deposits anywhere from 40,000 to 60,000 eggs in a tank, of which about 80% hatch. These eggs are imported from the United States because the waters here are slightly too cold for rainbow trout to spawn. Each week, eggs are deposited in Lago de la Cruz, the only lake in the park with a name, but fishing is permitted in almost all of the lakes and ponds. It is located about seven km from the town of Huasca.

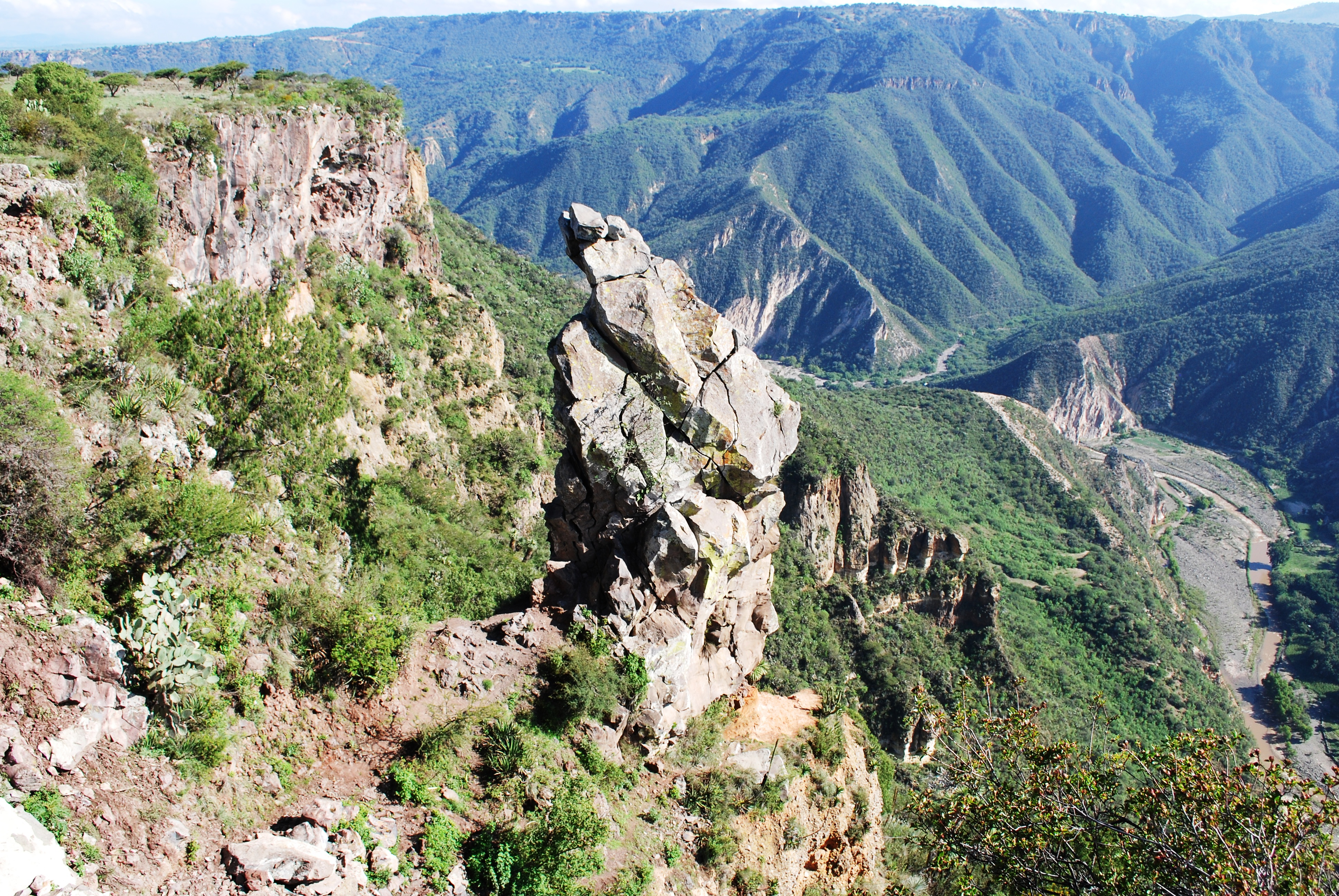
View of the Peña del Aire

The Peña del Aire is an enormous basalt rock that juts off the side of a canyon just north of the Santa María Regla Hacienda. Located 800 meters above the canyon floor, upon first glance, it appears suspended in the air, giving it its name. In this canyon flows a river arriving from Tulancingo and leading to the San Sebastian Canyon. Near this landmark are areas dedicated to rappelling, mountain climbing and hiking.

Just outside the town of Huasca is the Museo de los Duendes (a duende is a troll or goblin-like creature). Outside of the building is a sign which says "Aunque usted no lo crea" (Believe it or not). The building is small and made rough hewn wood from local trees. The museum is dedicated to stories of goblins and similar creatures around the world. According to legend, a group of friends were camping in this area in 1994 when they came upon a group of goblins which told them that their kind were angry over mankind's destruction of nature and cruelty to each other. They also stated that despite stories to the contrary, goblins were not evil creatures. This is reason behind the museum. The Museo de los Duendes A large part of its collection of goblin figures include those made from hair from horses' manes and tails.

The Aguacatitla Canyon is several km from San Miguel Regla and is one of the branches of the San Sebastian Canyon. This area has been developed for rappelling, hiking, and rock climbing. El Huariche is an ecotourism development on ejido land located in the community of Oje de Agua, near Santa María Regla. It has begins and camping areas, and is surrounded by pine forest. There are two organizations that offer hot air balloon tours over the area: Club Aerostático Nacional and Club de Aeronautas de México.
