= Basaltic Prisms of Santa María Regla =

Interlocking basalt columns in Hidalgo, Mexico

Coordinates: 20.2339°N 98.5629°W

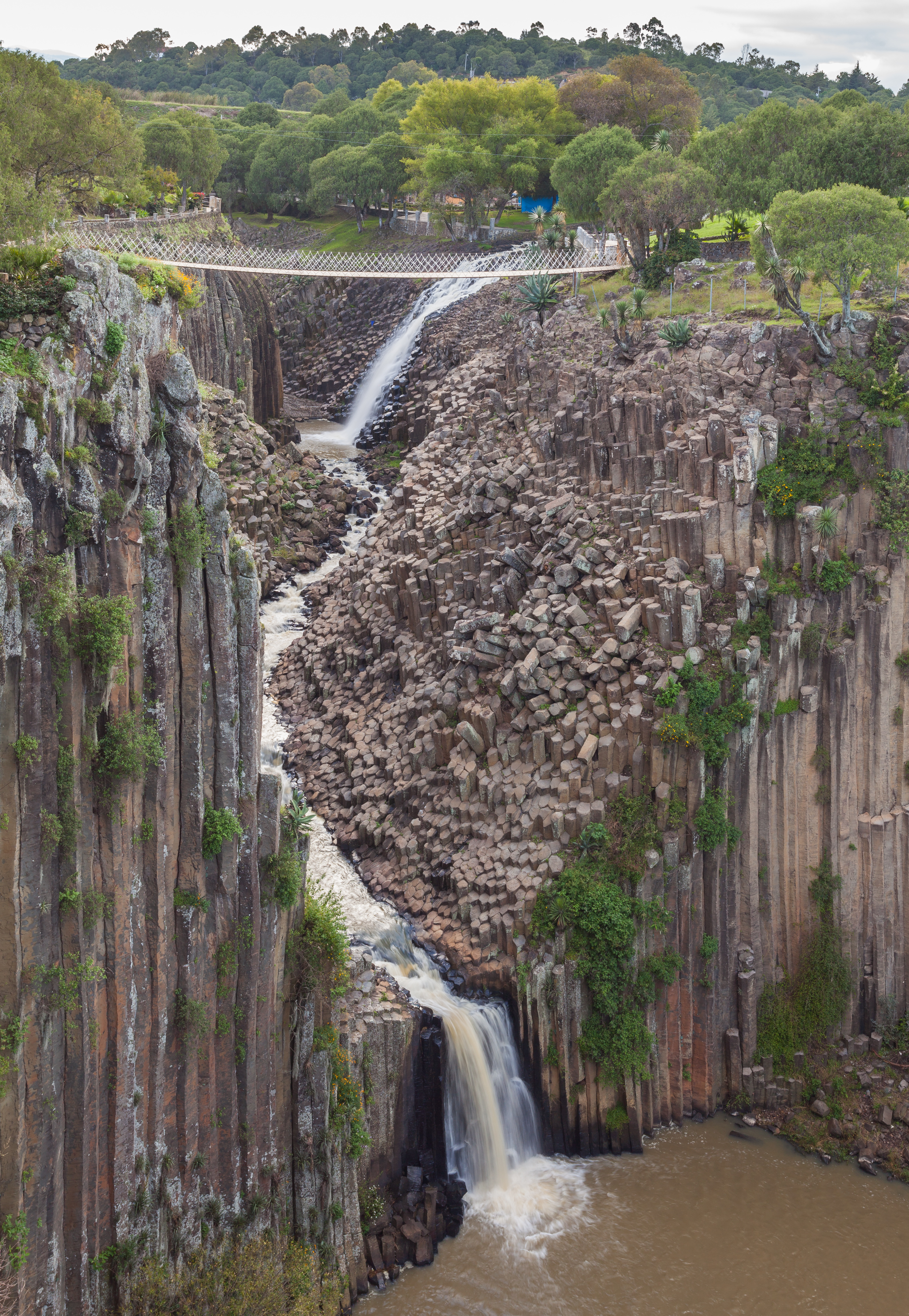
Basaltic Prisms of Santa María Regla, in 2013

The Basaltic Prisms of Santa María Regla are tall columnar joints of basalt rock near Huasca de Ocampo in the Mexican state of Hidalgo, that line a ravine through which water runs from the San Antonio Dam. This ravine area was part of the Santa María Regla Hacienda and was first promoted by Alexander von Humboldt in 1803.

The canyon walls, called the Barranca de Santa María Regla, are lined by polygonal columns between 30 and 50 metres (98 and 164 ft) high, with five or six sides each. The basalt columns were created by the slow cooling of volcanic lava. The visible columns are backed by even more polygonal basalt columns. There are two waterfalls. The higher one has its water supplemented by diversions from nearby dams. The lower one is called the Cascada de la Rosa. The natural canyon has been modified by the addition of stairs, walkways and hanging bridges for easier access.

== See also ==
- Columnar jointing
