= Mineral del Chico =

- Town and municipality
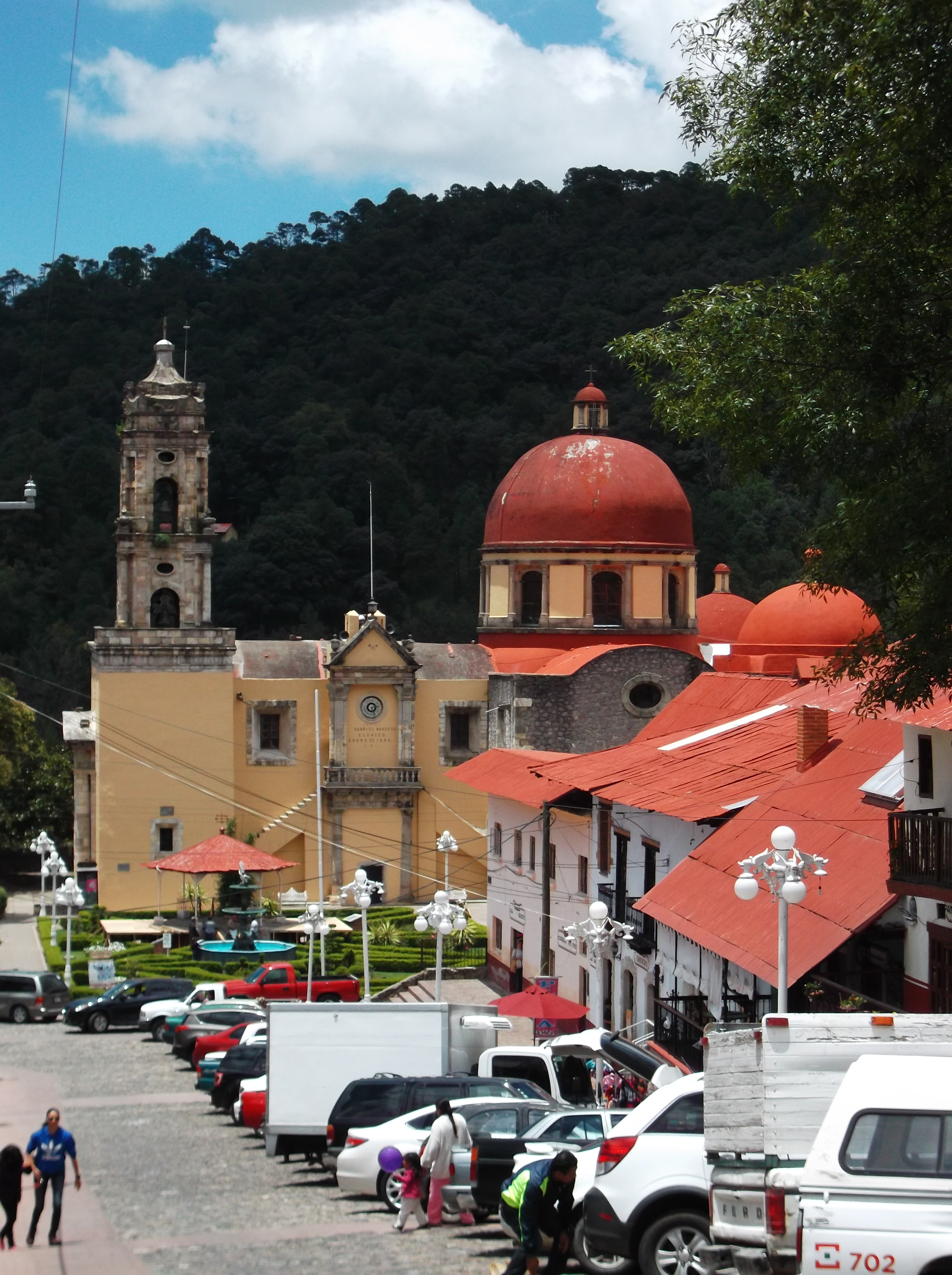
- The Parish of Imaculate Conseption and the main road

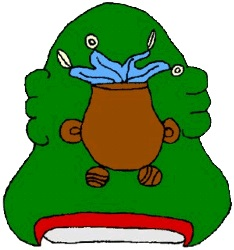
- Coat of arms

- Location within Hidalgo Location within Mexico
- Coordinates: 20°12′11″N 98°44′52″W
- Country: Mexico
- State: Hidalgo
- Municipality: Mineral del Chico

Government
  - Federal electoral district: Hidalgo's 3rd

Area
  - Total: 118.2 km^{2} (45.6 sq mi)
- Elevation: 2,342 m (7,684 ft)

Population (2010)
  - Total: 7,980
- Time zone: UTC-6 (Zona Centro)
- Website: www.mineraldelchico.gob.mx

Mineral del Chico (Spanish: [mineˈɾal del ˈtʃiko]) is a town and one of the 84 municipalities of Hidalgo, in central-eastern Mexico. The municipality covers an area of 118.2 km^{2}. The town was founded in 1569 and became one of the Pueblos Mágicos in 2011.

The Parish of Imaculate Conseption stands in center of town. The first chapel was built around the founding of the town in 1569. It was later demolished and the current chapel was built in its place in 1725, being remodeled in 1819. The fountain to the chapels side was built in 1886. Two years later, in 1888 the clock on the side of the church was built

As of 2010, the municipality had a total population of 7,980.

== Geography ==
=== Climate ===
Climate data for Mineral del Chico, Hidalgo, 1981-2010 normals, extremes 1980-present
Month	Jan	Feb	Mar	Apr	May	Jun	Jul	Aug	Sep	Oct	Nov	Dec	Year
Record high °C (°F)	29 (84)	30 (86)	30 (86)	33 (91)	34 (93)	31 (88)	29 (84)	29 (84)	26 (79)	29 (84)	26 (79)	27 (81)	34 (93)
Mean daily maximum °C (°F)	19.5 (67.1)	20.9 (69.6)	23.1 (73.6)	24.6 (76.3)	24.4 (75.9)	22.0 (71.6)	20.5 (68.9)	20.5 (68.9)	19.5 (67.1)	19.4 (66.9)	19.6 (67.3)	19.5 (67.1)	21.1 (70.0)
Daily mean °C (°F)	12.0 (53.6)	13.1 (55.6)	15.0 (59.0)	16.6 (61.9)	16.8 (62.2)	15.7 (60.3)	14.6 (58.3)	14.6 (58.3)	14.3 (57.7)	13.5 (56.3)	12.7 (54.9)	12.2 (54.0)	14.3 (57.7)
Mean daily minimum °C (°F)	4.3 (39.7)	5.1 (41.2)	6.7 (44.1)	8.2 (46.8)	8.5 (47.3)	9.1 (48.4)	8.5 (47.3)	8.0 (46.4)	8.7 (47.7)	7.4 (45.3)	5.6 (42.1)	4.8 (40.6)	7.1 (44.7)
Record low °C (°F)	−6 (21)	−6 (21)	−5 (23)	0 (32)	0 (32)	0 (32)	0 (32)	0 (32)	0 (32)	−2 (28)	−5 (23)	−6 (21)	−6 (21)
Average precipitation mm (inches)	18.4 (0.72)	23.5 (0.93)	16.0 (0.63)	35.9 (1.41)	63.8 (2.51)	184.1 (7.25)	197.2 (7.76)	181.7 (7.15)	251.6 (9.91)	129.9 (5.11)	32.3 (1.27)	11.2 (0.44)	1,145.6 (45.09)
Average rainy days (≥ 0.5 mm)	3.1	3.5	3.4	6.0	7.7	14.3	17.7	15.4	18.1	11.6	4.8	2.4	108.0
Source: Servicio Meteorológico Nacional

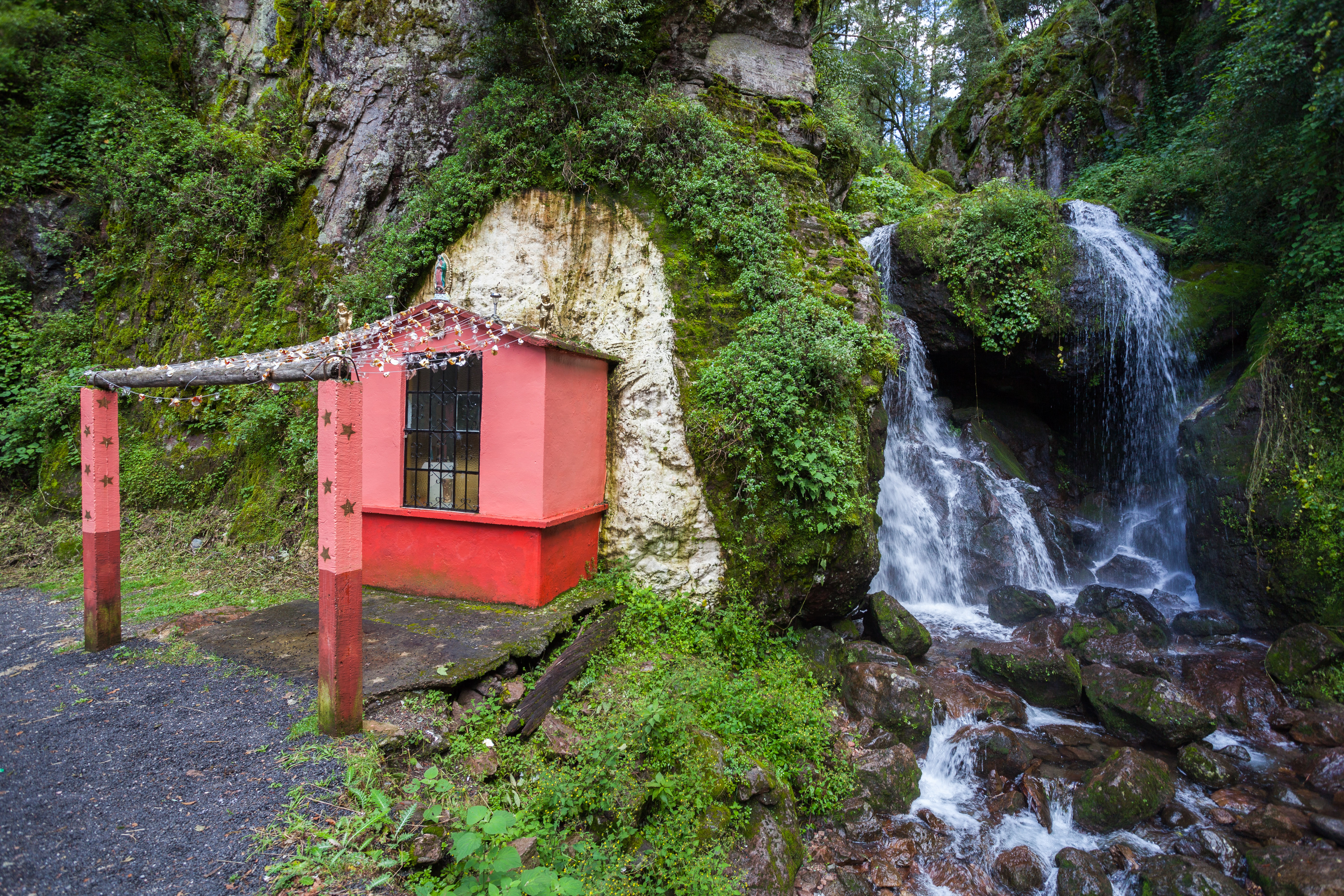
Waterfall and chapel near Mineral del Chico

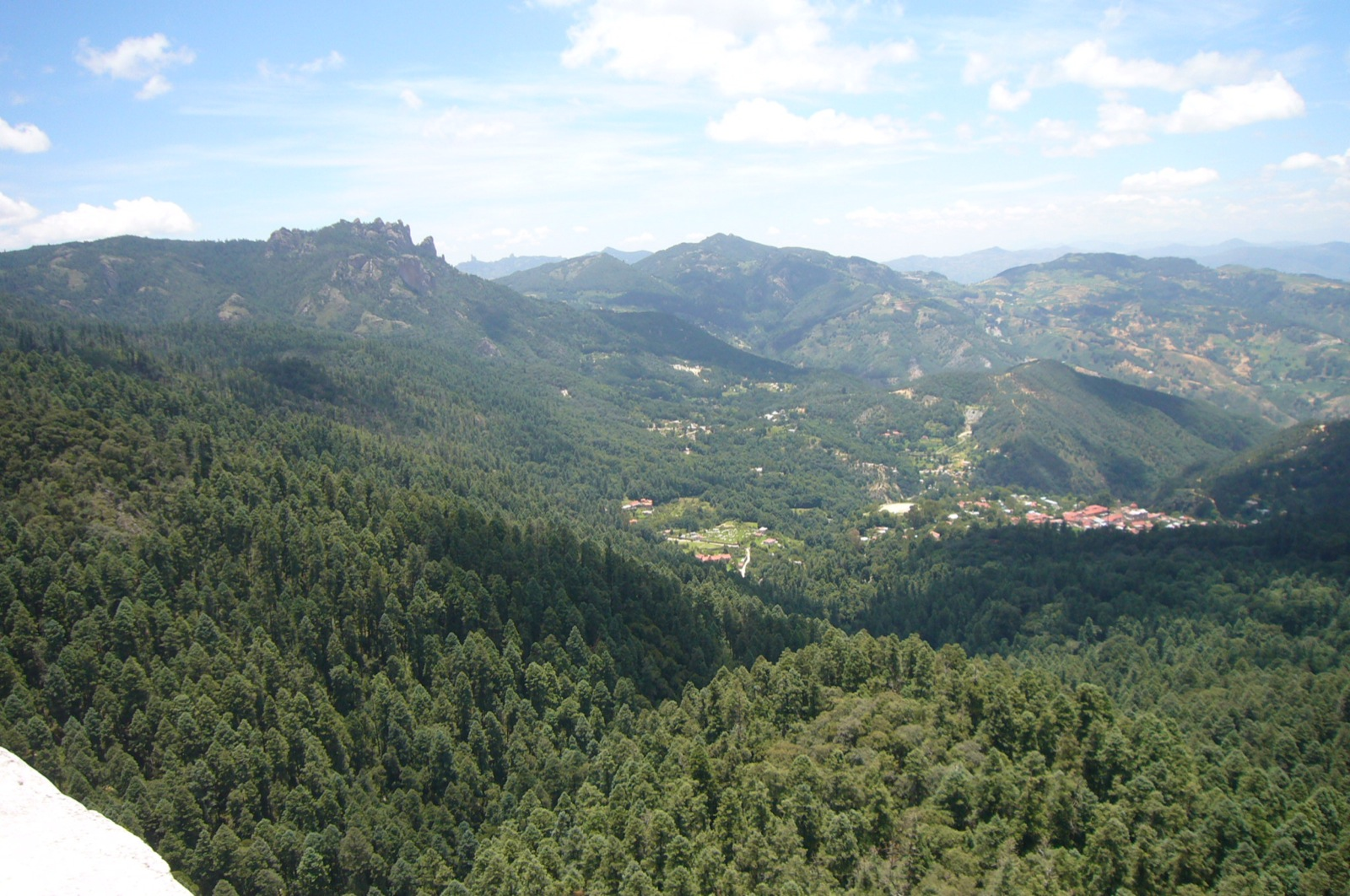
El Chico National Park.

== See also ==
- Mineral del Monte
