= Atotonilco El Grande =

- Town and municipality
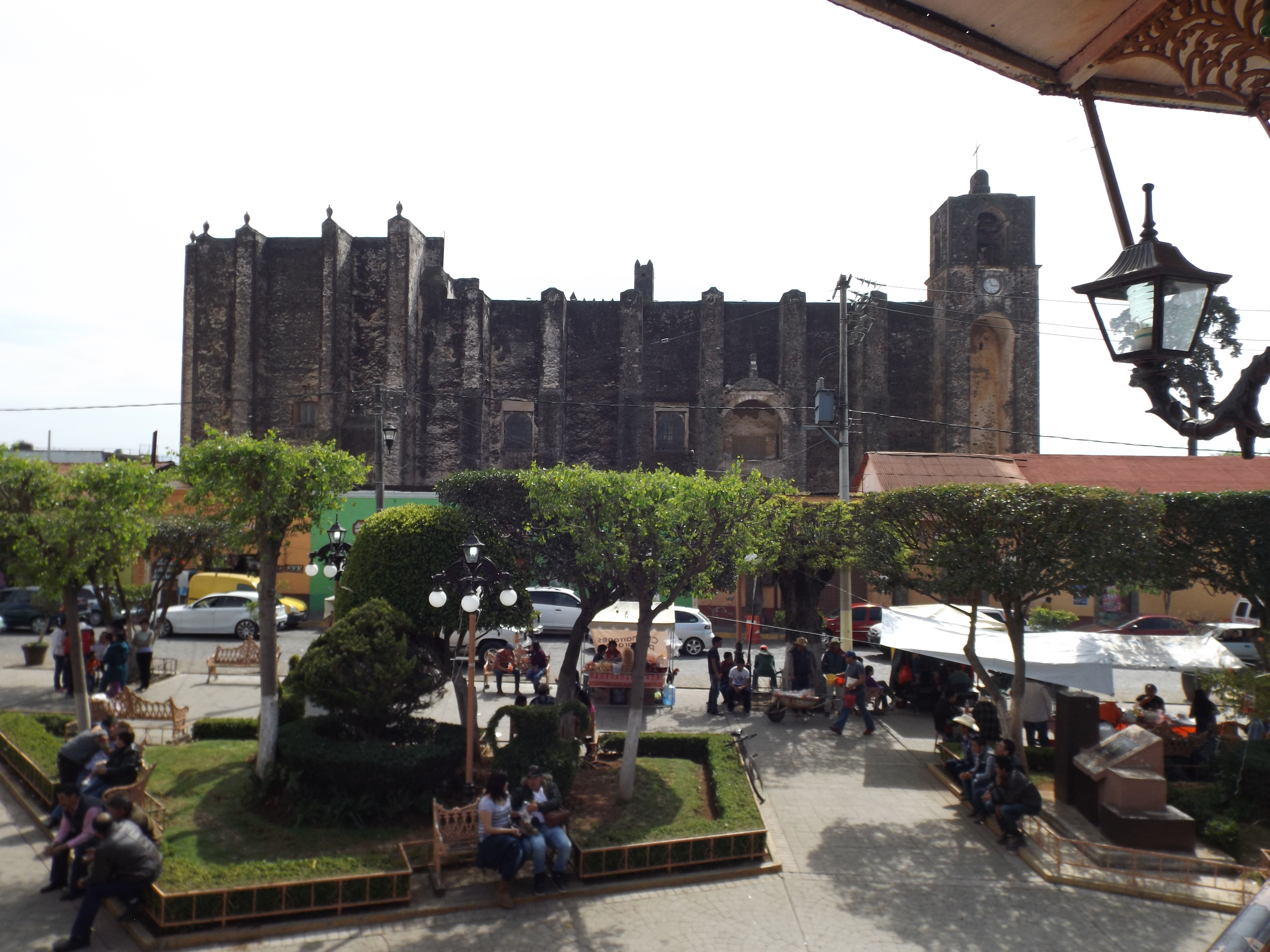
- Central Atotonilco el Grande

- Coat of arms

- Location within Hidalgo Location within Mexico
- Coordinates: 20°40′N 98°40′W
- Country: Mexico
- State: Hidalgo
- Municipality: Atotonilco El Grande

Government
  - Federal electoral district: Hidalgo's 3rd

Area
  - Total: 426.6 km^{2} (164.7 sq mi)

Population (2005)
  - Total: 23,823
- Time zone: UTC-6 (Zona Centro)
- Website: atotonilcoelgrande.gob.mx

Atotonilco El Grande is a town and one of the 84 municipalities of Hidalgo, in central-eastern Mexico. The municipality covers an area of 426.6 km^{2} (164.7 sq mi).

As of 2005, the municipality had a total population of 23,823.

== History ==
In prehispanic times, Atotonilco was an Otomi settlement, though there were also some Nahuas. Atotonilco was a city-state that had subject towns, of which Acatlán and Huasca de Ocampo (then known as Cuachquezaloyan) were the major two. Maguey was an important resource of the region. Atotonilco was conquered by Moctezuma I, and became the center of a tributary province which grew with later conquests, including Tulancingo. It offered mantas, warrior costumes, and staple foods as tribute to the Aztecs.
