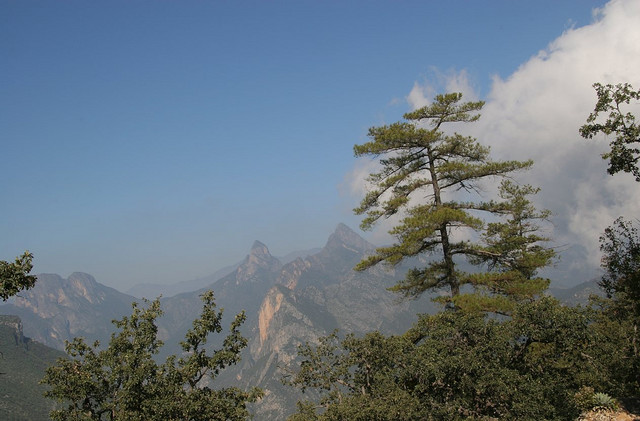

Conservation status
- Least Concern (IUCN 3.1)

Scientific classification
- Kingdom: Plantae
- Clade: Tracheophytes
- Clade: Gymnosperms
- Division: Pinophyta
- Class: Pinopsida
- Order: Pinales
- Family: Pinaceae
- Genus: Pinus
- Subgenus: P. subg. Pinus
- Section: P. sect. Trifoliae
- Subsection: P. subsect. Australes
- Species: P. teocote

Binomial name
- Pinus teocote Schiede ex Schltdl. & Cham.
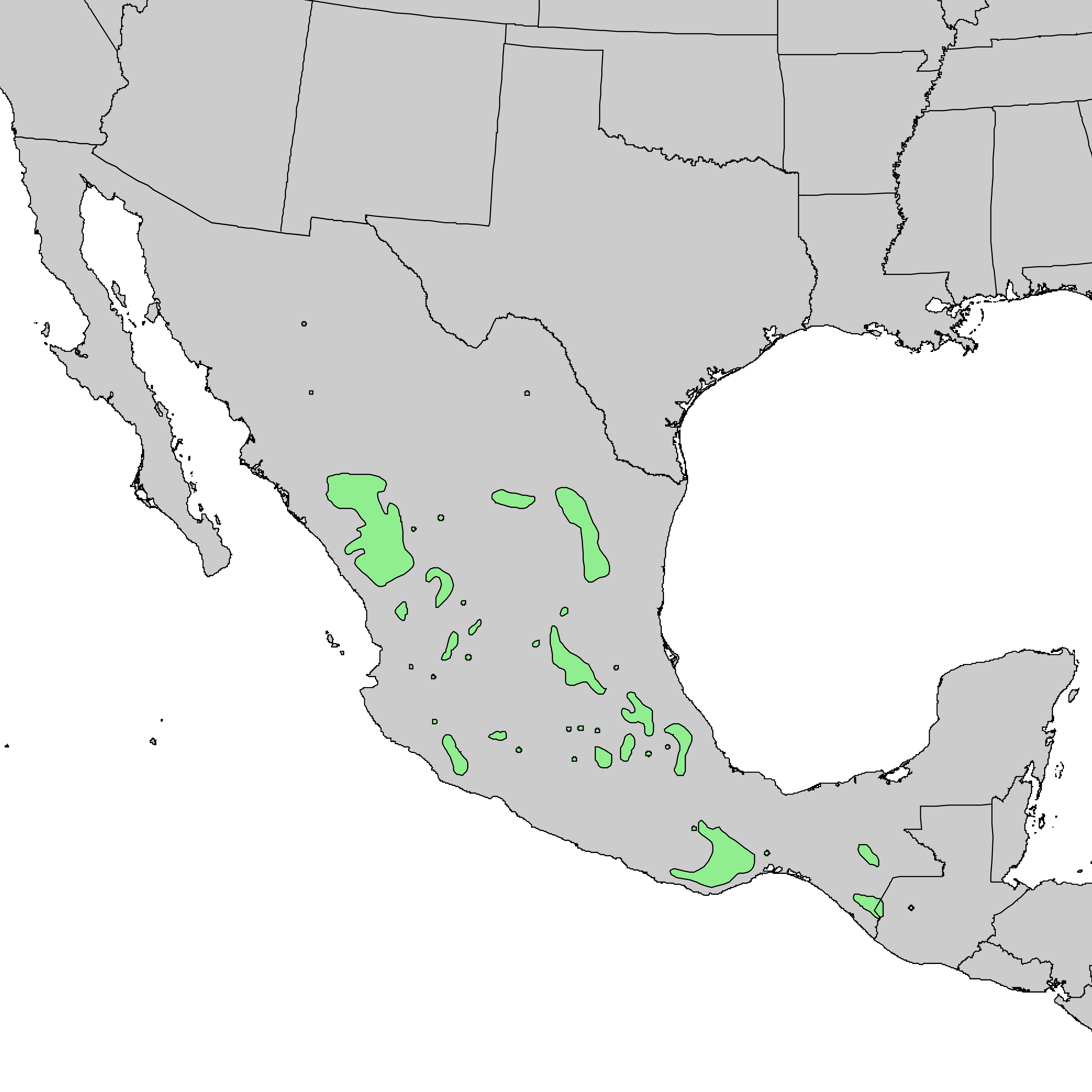
- Natural range of Pinus teocote

= Pinus teocote =

Species of conifer

Pinus teocote, the teocote, is a species of conifer in the family Pinaceae. It is a pine endemic to Mexico. 20–30 m tall and 75 cm diameter. Straight trunk and dense top. It grows at elevations of 1,500–3,000 m (4,900–9,800 ft). Most of the rainfall in its habitat occurs in summer.

The wood is white-yellowish, moderate in quality. The resin is used to produce turpentine.
