= Pachuca Range =

Mountain range in Mexico

Coordinates: 20°08′30″N 99°38′00″W

The Pachuca Range (Sierra de Pachuca) is a mountain range in the Sierra Madre Oriental of central Mexico, in the state of Hidalgo.

== History and etymology ==
The mountains were named Pachoacan (Pachyohcan) (place of hay) by the native Nahuatl speakers, although there are also a variety of other theories about the origin and meaning of the name. The earliest recorded settlement name is "Pachuquillo" a diminutive of Pachuca. Later the town of Pachuca de Soto and the municipality were named Pachuca.

== Geography ==
The Pachucas form the northeastern boundary of Mezquital Valley. They trend northwest–southeast and run about 45 kilometres (28 mi) from Cerro Monte Noble in the north to Real del Monte at the southeast.

== Geology ==
The surface rocks are volcanics beginning with Miocene andesites and microdiorites followed by alkaline basalts.

The rocks are highly mineralized and contain ores of gold, silver, lead zinc, mercury and other metals. The mining districts of Pachuca and Real del Monte lie on opposite sides of the Pachucas.
