= Actopan =

Actopan (Spanish: Actopan) is the name of several geographical objects in Mexico:

- Actopan, Hidalgo, a city in Hidalgo
  - Actopan Municipality, Hidalgo
- Actopan, Veracruz, a city in Veracruz
  - Actopan Municipality, Veracruz
- Actopan River, in Veracruz
