= Gonzalo Rodríguez Anaya =

Mexican politician (born 1942)

- Born: 21 October 1942 (age 83); Acatlán, Hidalgo, Mexico
- Occupation: Politician
- Political party: PRI (1970s–2008); PAN (2008–)

Gonzalo Rodríguez Anaya (born 21 October 1942) is a Mexican politician affiliated with the National Action Party (PAN) who formerly belonged to the Institutional Revolutionary Party (PRI).

In 2003–2006, Rodríguez Anaya served as a federal deputy in the 59th Congress, representing Hidalgo's third district, and he previously served as a local deputy in the LII and LV Legislatures of the Congress of Hidalgo.
