= El Arenal, Hidalgo =

El Arenal
- Town and municipality
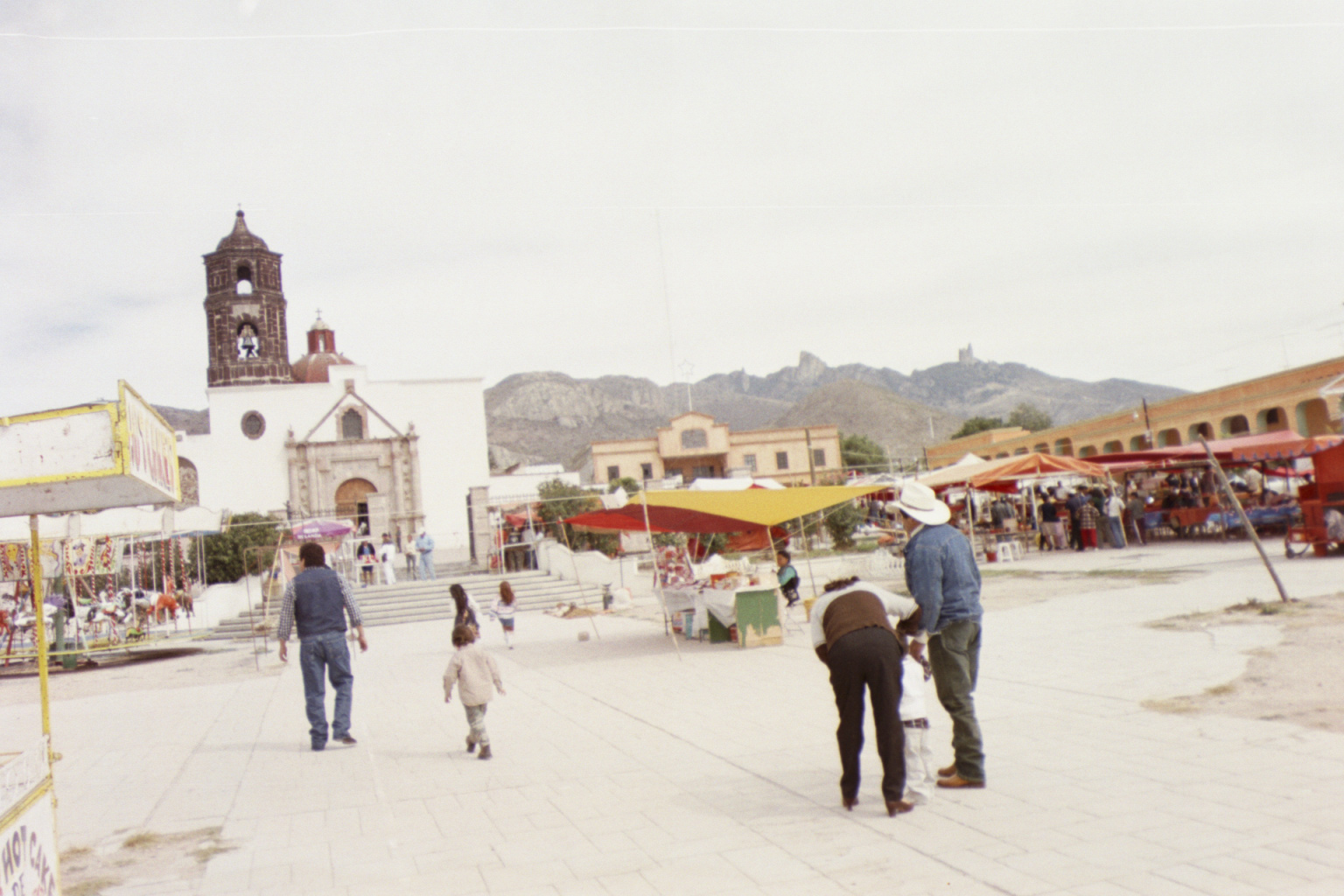
- Town square, El Arenal

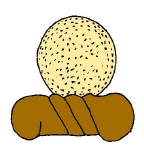
- Coat of arms

- Location within Hidalgo Location within Mexico
- Coordinates: 20°13′N 98°55′W
- Country: Mexico
- State: Hidalgo
- Municipality: El Arenal

Government
  - Federal electoral district: Hidalgo's 3rd

Area
  - Total: 125.9 km^{2} (48.6 sq mi)

Population (2005)
  - Total: 15,037
- Time zone: UTC-6 (Zona Centro)
- Website: elarenal.gob.mx

El Arenal is a town and one of the 84 municipalities of Hidalgo, in central-eastern Mexico. The municipality covers an area of 125.9 km^{2} (48.6 sq mi).

As of 2005, the municipality had a total population of 15,037.
