= Víctor Hugo Velasco Orozco =

Mexican politician

- Born: 17 November 1971 (age 54); Tulancingo, Hidalgo, Mexico
- Occupation: Deputy
- Political party: PRI

Víctor Hugo Velasco Orozco (born 17 November 1971) is a Mexican politician affiliated with the Institutional Revolutionary Party (PRI). In 2012–2015 he served as a federal deputy in the 62nd Congress, representing Hidalgo's third district.
