= Singuilucan =

- Town and municipality
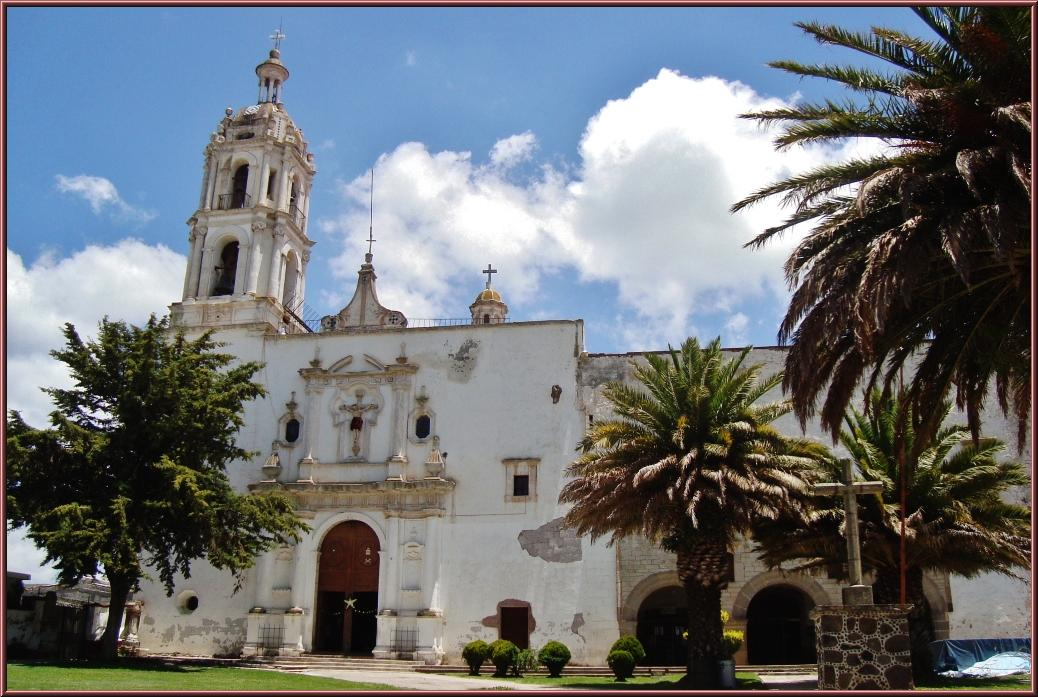
- Former convent in Singuilucan

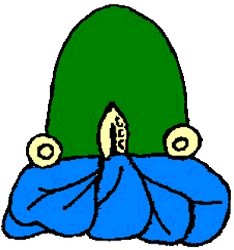
- Coat of arms

- Location within Hidalgo Location within Mexico
- Coordinates: 19°58′3″N 98°31′4.08″W
- Country: Mexico
- State: Hidalgo
- Municipality: Singuilucan

Government
  - Federal electoral district: Hidalgo's 3rd

Area
  - Total: 334.1 km^{2} (129.0 sq mi)

Population (2005)
  - Total: 13,143
- Time zone: UTC-6 (Zona Centro)
- Website: singuilucan.gob.mx

Singuilucan is a town and one of the 84 municipalities of Hidalgo, in central-eastern Mexico. The municipality covers an area of 334.1 km^{2} (129.0 sq mi). As of 2005, the municipality had a total population of 13,143.

The name of Singuilucan has been erroneously given as "lugar de lodo o de mucho lodo" (place of silt or too much mud), which in Nahuatl would be Zoquilocan. But the pre-Columbian glyph for this town clearly shows a hill with quelites (quilitl means green herbs, tzintli in Nahuatl) growing at its base. It also shows a blade of a knife, alluding to the obsidian blade industry of Teotihuacan, which was based in this area, as well as there is nearby "El Cerro de las Navajas" ("hill of the knives").

So the correct translation of Singuilucan is tzinquilocan, "the place at the base of the mountain of quelites".
