= Omitlán de Juárez =

- Town and municipality
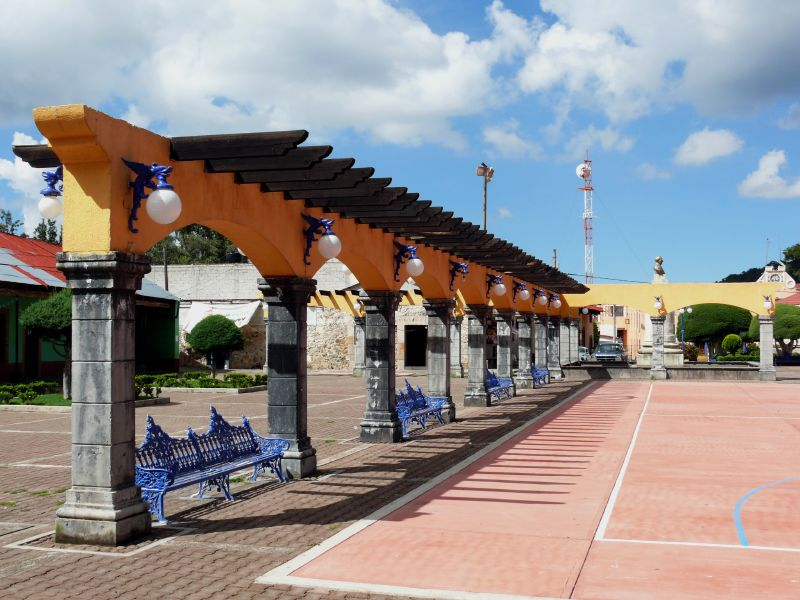
- Going from Pachuca to Huasca de Ocampo, visitors will find the town of Omitlán

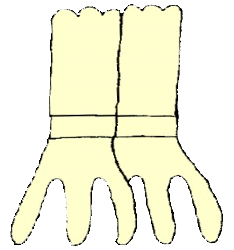
- Coat of arms

- Location within Hidalgo Location within Mexico
- Coordinates: 20°10′11″N 98°38′52″W
- Country: Mexico
- State: Hidalgo
- Municipality: Omitlán de Juárez

Government
  - Federal electoral district: Hidalgo's 3rd

Area
  - Total: 110.5 km^{2} (42.7 sq mi)

Population (2005)
  - Total: 7,529
- Time zone: UTC-6 (Zona Centro)
- Website: omitlandejuarez.gob.mx

Omitlán de Juárez is a town and one of the 84 municipalities of Hidalgo, in central-eastern Mexico. The municipality covers an area of 110.5 km^{2} (42.7 sq mi).

As of 2005, the municipality had a total population of 7,529.

== Toponymy ==
The name Omitlán in the Nahuatl language means Ome 'two' and tlan 'place', so it is understood that it means Place of two. (Note: The etymological origin of the name of a municipality can have various interpretations or have an uncertain origin, this is the most common or most accepted by the municipal government and its inhabitants, according to the Encyclopedia of the Municipalities of Mexico.) The surname de Juárez was given to him by the former president of Mexico, Benito Juárez García.

== Geography ==
Omitlán de Juárez stands on Federal Highway 105, which connects Pachuca, Hidalgo, to Tempoal de Sánchez, Veracruz.

=== Terrain and hydrology ===
Omitlán de Juárez is located within the province of the Neovolcanic Axis; within the subprovince of Plains and Sierras of Querétaro and Hidalgo. Its terrain is mountainous (81.0%) and plain (19.0%) highlands. The hills known as Cerro Gordo, Cerro del Gallo and Peña del Zumate stand out.

Its geolog corresponds to the Neogene period (98.23%). With extrusive igneous rocks: intermediate volcanic breccia andesite (53.23%), acid tuff (27.0%), acid tuff, acid volcanic breccia (7.0%) and basalt (11.0%). Regarding soil science the dominant soil is phaeozem (72.23%), luvisol (17.0%) and regosol (9.0%).

With regard to hydrology, it is positioned in the hydrological region of the Pánuco; in the basins of the Moctezuma River; within the sub-basins of the Amajac River (51.0%) and Metztitlán River (49.0%). It has the Amajac and Bandola rivers, the latter of which flows into the Los Angeles Dam. It has two bodies of water.

=== Weather ===
The municipal territory is found in the following climates with their respective percentage: Temperate sub-humid with rainfall in summer, more humid (92.0%) and semi-cold sub-humid with rains in summer, more humid (8.0%). With an average annual temperature of 14 °C and an annual rainfall of 700 to 1200 millimeters.

=== Flora and fauna ===
The flora in the municipality is made up of oak, prickly pear, oyamel, ash, pine, walnut, quebrancha, tepozán, strawberry tree, as well as trees such as peach, pear, plum, blackberry, apple, etc. The fauna includes animals such as foxes, crows, squirrels, gophers, rattlesnakes, ouncers and a wide variety of songbirds, as well as insects and arachnids of different species.

== Demographics ==
=== Population ===
Demographic evolution of the municipality of Omitlán de Juárez.
Año	Población
1995	6498
2000	8022
2005	7529
2010	8963
2015	9636
2020	9295
Spring: INEGI.

According to the results presented by the 2020 Population and Housing Census of INEGI, the municipality has a total of 9295 inhabitants, 4422 men and 4873 women. It has a density of 116.6 inhabitants/km², half of the population is 29 years old or younger, there are 90 males for every 100 females.

The percentage of the population that speaks indigenous language is 0.31%, (Note: Percentage of population aged 3 years and over. and the percentage of the population that) considers itself Afro-Mexican or Afro-descendant is 0.22%. It has a Literacy rate of 99.4% in the population aged 15 to 24, and 92.1% in the population aged 25 and over. The percentage of population by level of schooling,. (Note: Percentage of population aged 15 and over) It is 5.5% without schooling, 65.2% with basic education, 20.5% with upper secondary education, 8.7% with higher education, and 0.1% unspecified.

The percentage of the population affiliated with health services is 62.3%. (Note: Includes multiple affiliations.) 27.3% are affiliated with the IMSS, 66.2% with INSABI, 5.8% with the ISSSTE, 0.4% with IMSS Bienestar, 0.1% with the health units of PEMEX, Defense or Navy, 1.1% to a private institution, and 0.1% to another institution. The percentage of the population with a disability is 5.1%. The percentage of population by marital status,. (Note: Percentage of population aged 12 and over) 30.2% are married, 31.9% single, 26.4% are in common-law unions, 5.0% are separated, 1.2% are divorced, 5.3% are widowed.

For 2020, the total number of inhabited private homes is 2506 homes, representing 0.3% of the state total. With an average number of occupants per dwelling of 3.2 people. Houses with partition and block walls predominate. In the municipality, for the year 2020, the electric power service covers a coverage of 99.4%; piped water service by 52.1%; drainage service covers 89.7%; and the health service by 91.9%.

=== Locations ===
For the year 2020, according to the Catalog of Localities, the municipality has 32 localities.

INEGI code	Localities	Population (2020)	Porcentage (%) (Note: Porcentaje respecto al total municipal; la suma podría variar del 100 % por el redondeo de decimales.)	Population Area (Note: De acuerdo al INEGI, se considera una localidad rural con una población menor a 2500 habitantes; y una localidad urbana con mayor o igual a 2500 habitantes; la cabecera municipal se considera urbana sin importar su población.)	Population Category (Note: De acuerdo a la Ley orgánica municipal del estado de Hidalgo se considera una ciudad a las que tengan más de 25 000 habitantes; pueblo, más de 10 000 habitantes; villa, más de 5000 habitantes; comunidad, más de 500 habitantes; y ranchería, las que tengan menos de 500 habitantes.)
130450022	San Antonio el Paso	1,260	13.56	Rural	Community
130450001	Omitlán de Juárez	1,050	11.30	Urban	Cabecera municipal
130450029	Venta de Guadalupe	848	9.12	Rural	Community
130450028	Velasco	553	5.95	Rural	Community
130450019	Puentecillas	452	4.86	Rural	Settlement
130450021	Rincón Chico	433	4.66	Rural	Settlement
130450020	Ignacio López Rayón	375	4.03	Rural	Settlement
130450011	Cruz de Omitlán	363	3.91	Rural	Settlement
130450030	El Mirador (La Coyotera)	332	3.57	Rural	Settlement
130450018	El Perico	316	3.40	Rural	Settlement
130450009	El Comanche	287	3.09	Rural	Settlement
130450012	Vicente Guerrero	281	3.02	Rural	Settlement
130450016	Morelos	253	2.72	Rural	Settlement
130450043	Los Tapancos	251	2.70	Rural	Settlement
130450023	Santa Elena	234	2.52	Rural	Settlement
130450027	Tres Cañadas	233	2.51	Rural	Settlement
130450015	Mixquiapan	215	2.31	Rural	Settlement
130450006	Cerro Gordo	185	1.99	Rural	Settlement
130450014	Manuel Teniente (El Llano)	185	1.99	Rural	Settlement
130450035	El Crucero de Huasca	180	1.94	Rural	Settlement
130450010	Cruz de Mujer	162	1.74	Rural	Settlement
130450005	El Capulín	122	1.31	Rural	Settlement
130450013	Lagunilla	121	1.30	Rural	Settlement
130450032	Cuchilalpan	117	1.26	Rural	Settlement
130450039	El Resbalón	107	1.15	Rural	Settlement
130450026	El Tejocote	102	1.10	Rural	Settlement
130450002	Agua Fría	101	1.09	Rural	Settlement
130450031	Las Palomas	65	0.70	Rural	Settlement
130450008	Ciénega Grande	49	0.53	Rural	Settlement
130450041	El Manzano	39	0.42	Rural	Settlement
130450007	Ciénega Chica	15	0.16	Rural	Settlement
130450040	Agua Escondida	9	0.10	Rural	Settlement

== Politics ==
It was erected as a municipality on August 8, 1865. The Honorable City Council is composed of: a Municipal President, a Syndic, eight Councilors, four Commissions, twenty-four Municipal Delegates and five Ejido Commissariats. According to the National Electoral Institute (INE) the municipality is made up of ten electoral sections, from A 0812 to 0821. For the election of federal deputies to the Chamber of Deputies of Mexico and local deputies to the Congress of Hidalgo, the III Federal Electoral District of Hidalgo and the IX Local Electoral District of Hidalgo are integrated. A state administrative level belongs to Macroregion I and Microregion V, as well as to Operational Region I Pachuca.

=== Chronology of municipal presidents ===
Period	Name	Political affiliation
1964-1967	David Manning Esquivel	-
1967-1970	Rubén López Cerón	-
1970-1973	J. Félix Melgarejo Anaya	-
1973-1976	Alberto Rivera Vázquez	-
1976-1979	Jose A. Vivar Sanchez	-
1979-1982	José Manning Bustamante	-
1982-1985	José de Jesús Rogelio Melgarejo Amador	-
1985-1988	Jorge Alvarado Arista	-
1988-1991	José Calderón Mancilla	-
1991-1994	Carolina Patricia Borbolla Calderón	-
16/01/1994 to 15/01/1997	Fermín Laurel Cabrera Arista	PRI
16/01/1997 to 15/01/2000	Irais García Samperio	PRI
16/01/2000 to 15/01/2003	José Calderón Mancilla	PRI
16/01/2003 to 15/01/2006	José Antonio Pérez Anaya	PAN
16/01/2006 to 15/01/2009	José Luis Ordaz Ríos	PAN
16/01/2009 to 15/01/2012	Gerardo Manuel Arcega Domínguez	Mas x Hidalgo
16/01/2012 to 04/09/2016	Juan Carlos Zarco Cruz	Together for Hidalgo
05/09/2016 to 18/01/2017	Rubén Martín López García	Interim City; Council (Note: The 2016 Hidalgo State Elections were declared null and void)
19/02/2017 to 04/09/2020	Ulises Hernández Vázquez	PRI (Note: Winner of the 2016 Hidalgo Special State Election)
05/09/2020 to 14/12/2020	Juan Carlos Zarco Cruz	Interim City; Council (Note: Due to the postponement of the 2020 Hidalgo State Election, due to the COVID-19 pandemic; Interim Municipal Councils are appointed. Alejandro, Reyes (May 15, 2020). "Possibility of implementing Municipal Councils due to suspension of elections". Milenio Diario.Teodoro, Santos (June 26, 2020). "Municipal Councils, citizens in power in 84 municipalities". Milenio Diario.)
15/12/2020 to 04/09/2024	Jorge Martín Borbolla Calderón	PRI

== Economy ==
In 2015 the municipality had an HDI of 0.701 High, so ranks 45th at the state level; and in 2005 it had a GDP of $326,367,496.00 and a GDP per capita of $43,348.00 (current 2005 prices).

According to the National Council for the Evaluation of Social Development Policy (Coneval), the municipality registers a Marginalization Index Medium. 47.5% of the population is in moderate poverty and 15.1% is in extreme poverty. In 2015, the municipality ranked 43rd out of 84 municipalities in the state scale of social backwardness.

As of 2015 data, in terms of agriculture, in this municipality it is mostly corn grain and forage oats, and although in a smaller proportion apples, peaches and barley grain are planted. In livestock the majority of livestock production is sheep and poultry and to a lesser extent goats.

As of 2015, there are 113 economic units, which generated jobs for 146 people. As far as commerce is concerned, there are two tianguis, seven Diconsa stores, and one Liconsa store; as well as a municipal market, and a municipal flea market. According to figures for the year 2015 presented in the Economic Censuses by INEGI, the Economically Active Population (EAP) of the municipality amounts to 3280 of which 3098 are employed and 182 are unemployed. (Note: Size of the community according to the number of inhabitants for the population aged 12 years and over.) 16.30% belong to the primary sector, 33.63% belong to the secondary sector, 49.80% belong to the tertiary sector and 0.27% did not specify.
