= Sergio Hernández Hernández =

Mexican politician

- Born: 3 June 1962 (age 63); Hidalgo, Mexico
- Occupation: Politician
- Political party: PRD

Sergio Hernández Hernández (born 3 June 1962) is a Mexican politician affiliated with the Party of the Democratic Revolution (PRD). In 2006–2009 he served as a federal deputy in the 60th Congress, representing Hidalgo's third district.
