= San Agustín Metzquititlán =

- Town and municipality
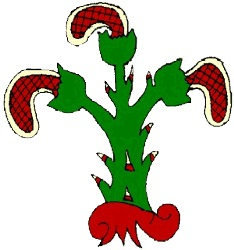
- Coat of arms

- Location within Hidalgo Location within Mexico
- Coordinates: 20°31′54″N 98°38′24″W
- Country: Mexico
- State: Hidalgo
- Municipality: Metzquititlán

Government
  - Federal electoral district: Hidalgo's 3rd

Area
  - Total: 313.5 km^{2} (121.0 sq mi)

Population (2005)
  - Total: 8,558
- Time zone: UTC-6 (Zona Centro)
- Website: metzquititlan.gob.mx

San Agustín Metzquititlán is a town and one of the 84 municipalities of Hidalgo, in central-eastern Mexico. The municipality covers an area of 313.5 km^{2} (121.0 sq mi).

The town stands on Federal Highway 105, which connects Pachuca, Hidalgo, to Tempoal de Sánchez, Veracruz.

As of 2005, the municipality had a total population of 8,558.

== See also ==
- Iglesia de la Purísima Concepción, in Santa María Xoxoteco
