= Esteban Ángeles Cerón =

Mexican politician (born 1946)

- Born: 8 February 1946 (age 80); Tornacuxtla, San Agustín Tlaxiaca, Hidalgo, Mexico
- Occupation: Politician
- Political party: PRI

Esteban Miguel Ángeles Cerón (born 8 February 1946) is a Mexican politician affiliated with the Institutional Revolutionary Party (PRI). In 2000–2006 he served as a senator during the 58th and 59th Congresses, representing Hidalgo, and in 1997–2000 he served as a federal deputy in the 57th Congress, representing Hidalgo's third district.
