= 3rd federal electoral district of Hidalgo =

Federal electoral district of Mexico

Hidalgo's 3rd
- Electoral district of the Chamber of Deputies of Mexico

- 3rd district since 2023

Incumbent
- Member: Tatiana Ángeles Moreno
- Party: ▌Morena
- Congress: 66th (2024–2027)

District
- State: Hidalgo
- Head town: Actopan
- Coordinates: 20°16′N 98°56′W
- Covers: 12 municipalities: Actopan, Atotonilco el Grande, El Arenal, Epazoyucan, Huasca de Ocampo, Metztitlán, Mineral del Chico, Mineral del Monte, Mineral de la Reforma, Omitlán de Juárez, San Agustín Metzquititlán, Singuilucan
- PR region: Fourth
- Precincts: 263
- Population: 425,148 (2020 census)

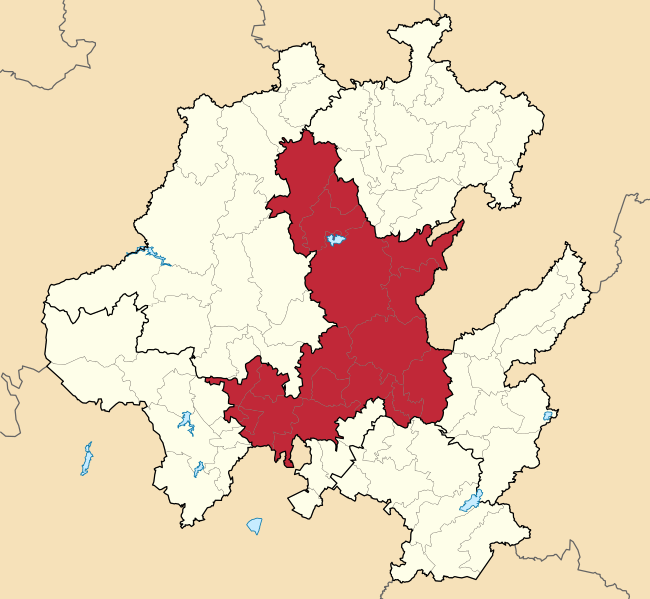
3rd district in 2017–2022

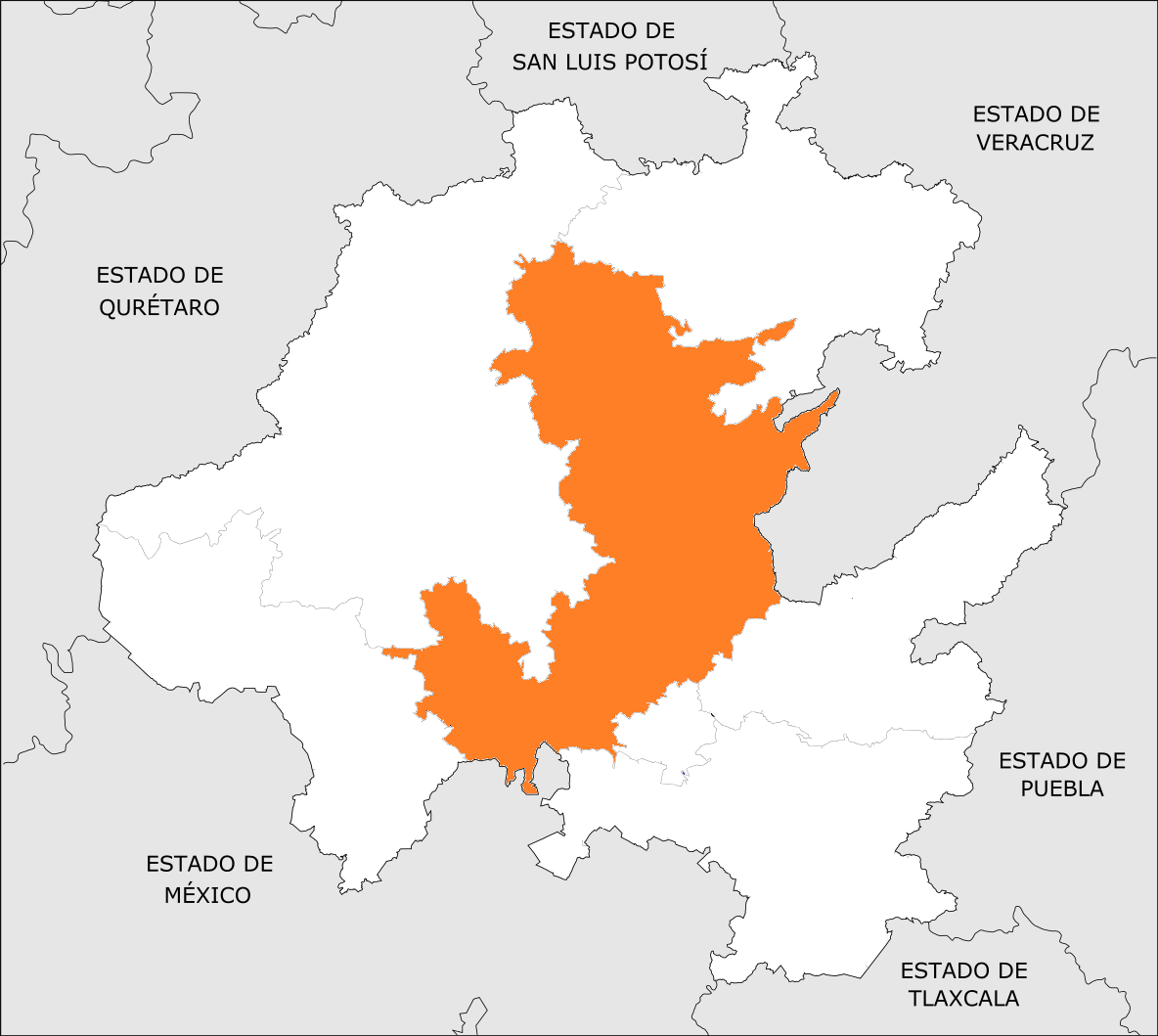
3rd district in 2005–2017

The 3rd federal electoral district of Hidalgo (Spanish: Distrito electoral federal 03 de Hidalgo) is one of the 300 electoral districts into which Mexico is divided for elections to the federal Chamber of Deputies and one of seven such districts in the state of Hidalgo.

It elects one deputy to the lower house of Congress for each three-year legislative period by means of the first-past-the-post system. Votes cast in the district also count towards the calculation of proportional representation ("plurinominal") deputies elected from the fourth electoral region. (Note: Between 2005 and 2023, Hidalgo was assigned to the fifth region.)

The current member for the district, elected in the 2024 general election, is Tatiana Tonantzin Ángeles Moreno of the National Regeneration Movement (Morena).

== District territory ==
Under the 2023 districting plan adopted by the National Electoral Institute (INE), which is to be used for the 2024, 2027 and 2030 federal elections, the district's head town (cabecera distrital), where results from individual polling stations are gathered together and tallied, is the city of Actopan. Hidalgo's 3rd covers 263 electoral precincts (secciones electorales) across 12 of the state's municipalities:

- Actopan, Atotonilco el Grande, El Arenal, Epazoyucan, Huasca de Ocampo, Metztitlán, Mineral del Chico, Mineral del Monte, Mineral de la Reforma, Omitlán de Juárez, San Agustín Metzquititlán and Singuilucan.

The district reported a population of 425,148 in the 2020 census.

== Previous districting plans ==
Evolution of electoral district numbers
	1974	1978	1996	2005	2017	2023
Hidalgo	5	6	7	7	7	7
Chamber of Deputies	196	300				

2017–2022

Under the 2017 plan, the district covered 19 municipalities:
- Actopan, Ajacuba, Atotonilco el Grande, El Arenal, Eloxochitlán, Francisco I. Madero, Huasca de Ocampo, Juárez Hidalgo, Metztitlán, Mineral del Chico, Mineral del Monte, Mixquiahuala de Juárez, Omitlán de Juárez, San Agustín Metzquititlán, San Agustín Tlaxiaca, Tetepango, Tlahuelilpan, Tlahuiltepa and Zacualtipán de Ángeles.

2005–2017

Between 2005 and 2017, it comprised 19 municipalities:
- Actopan, Ajacuba, Atotonilco El Grande, El Arenal, Eloxochitlán, Francisco I. Madero, Juárez Hidalgo, Metztitlán, Mineral del Chico, Mixquiahuala de Juárez, Molango de Escamilla, Progreso de Obregón, San Agustín Metzquititlán, San Agustín Tlaxiaca, Tetepango, Tlahuelilpan, Tlahuiltepa, Xochicoatlán and Zacualtipán de Ángeles.

1996–2005

The 1996 redistricting process created Hidalgo's 7th district. The 3rd district comprised 15 municipalities:
- Actopan, Atotonilco El Grande, El Arenal, Eloxochitlán, Francisco I. Madero, Juárez Hidalgo, Metztitlán, Progreso de Obregón, San Agustín Metzquititlán, Tlahuiltepa, Xochicoatlán, Zacualtipán de Ángeles, Santiago de Anaya, San Salvador and Tianguistengo.

1978–1996

The districting scheme in force from 1978 to 1996 was the result of the 1977 electoral reforms, which increased the number of single-member seats in the Chamber of Deputies from 196 to 300. Under that plan, Hidalgo's seat allocation rose from five to six. The 3rd district's head town was at Tula de Allende and it covered 14 municipalities.
- Ajacuba, Atitalaquía, Atotonilco de Tula, Chilcuautla, Francisco I. Madero, Mixquiahuala, Progreso, Tepeji del Río, Tepetitlán, Tetepango, Tezontepec, Tlahuelilpan, Taxcoapan and Tula de Allende.

== Deputies returned to Congress ==
(Mexico) National parties
- Current
- PAN
- PRI
- PT
- PVEM
- MC
- Morena
- PAZ
- Somos
- Defunct or local only
- PLM
- PNR
- PRM
- PNM
- PP
- PPS
- PARM
- PFCRN
- CON
- PANAL
- PSD
- PES
- PES
- PRD

Hidalgo's 3rd district
Election	Deputy	Party	Term	Legislature
1916	Alberto M. González		1916–1917	Constituent Congress of Querétaro
1917	Alberto M. González		1917–1918	27th Congress
1918	Pablo Aguilar		1918–1920	28th Congress
1920	Abel Hernández Coronado		1920–1922	29th Congress
1922	Celso Ruiz		1922–1924	30th Congress
1924	Leonardo M. Hernández		1924–1926	31st Congress
1926	José H. Romero		1926–1928	32nd Congress
1928	Benito Calva		1928–1930	33rd Congress
1930	Carlos Velázquez Méndez		1930–1932	34th Congress
1932	José Rivera	Institutional Revolutionary Party	1932–1934	35th Congress
1934	Brígido Barrón	Institutional Revolutionary Party	1934–1937	36th Congress
1937	Agustín Olvera	Institutional Revolutionary Party	1937–1940	37th Congress
1940	Gumesindo Gómez		1940–1943	38th Congress
1943	Víctor M. Aguirre	Institutional Revolutionary Party	1943–1946	39th Congress
1946	Felipe Contreras Ruiz	Institutional Revolutionary Party	1946–1949	40th Congress
1949	Víctor M. Aguirre del Castillo	Institutional Revolutionary Party	1949–1952	41st Congress
1952	José María de los Reyes	Institutional Revolutionary Party	1952–1955	42nd Congress
1955	Carlos Ramírez Guerrero	Institutional Revolutionary Party	1955–1958	43rd Congress
1958	Federico Ocampo Noble Pérez	Institutional Revolutionary Party	1958–1961	44th Congress
1961	Daniel Campuzano Barajas	Institutional Revolutionary Party	1961–1964	45th Congress
1964	Heberto Malo Paulín	Institutional Revolutionary Party	1964–1967	46th Congress
1967	Sergio Butrón Casas	Institutional Revolutionary Party	1967–1970	47th Congress
1970	Humberto Cuevas Villegas	Institutional Revolutionary Party	1970–1973	48th Congress
1973	Estela Rojas de Soto	Institutional Revolutionary Party	1973–1976	49th Congress
1976	Efraín Mera Arias	Institutional Revolutionary Party	1976–1979	50th Congress
1979	María Amelia Olguín Vargas	Institutional Revolutionary Party	1979–1982	51st Congress
1982	César Vieyra Salgado	Institutional Revolutionary Party	1982–1985	52nd Congress
1985	María Amelia Olguín Vargas	Institutional Revolutionary Party	1985–1988	53rd Congress
1988	César Vieyra Salgado	Institutional Revolutionary Party	1988–1991	54th Congress
1991	Ernesto Gil Elorduy	Institutional Revolutionary Party	1991–1994	55th Congress
1994	Guillermo Álvarez Cuevas	Institutional Revolutionary Party	1994–1997	56th Congress
1997	Esteban Ángeles Cerón	Institutional Revolutionary Party	1997–2000	57th Congress
2000	David Penchyna Grub	Institutional Revolutionary Party	2000–2003	58th Congress
2003	Gonzalo Rodríguez Anaya	Institutional Revolutionary Party	2003–2006	59th Congress
2006	Sergio Hernández Hernández	Party of the Democratic Revolution	2006–2009	60th Congress
2009	Jorge Rojo García de Alba	Institutional Revolutionary Party	2009–2012	61st Congress
2012	Víctor Hugo Velasco Orozco	Institutional Revolutionary Party	2012–2015	62nd Congress
2015	Pedro Luis Noble Monterrubio	Institutional Revolutionary Party	2015–2018	63rd Congress
2018	Sandra Simey Olvera Bautista	National Regeneration Movement	2018–2021	64th Congress
2021	Sandra Simey Olvera Bautista	National Regeneration Movement	2021–2024	65th Congress
2024	Tatiana Tonantzin Ángeles Moreno	National Regeneration Movement	2024–2027	66th Congress

== Presidential elections ==
Hidalgo's 3rd district
Election	District won by	Party or coalition	%
2018	Andrés Manuel López Obrador	Juntos Haremos Historia	63.3640
2024	Claudia Sheinbaum Pardo	Sigamos Haciendo Historia	64.3925
