= Iglesia de la Purísima Concepción (Santa María Xoxoteco) =

Church building in Santa María Xoxoteco, Mexico

Coordinates: 19.5173°N 99.1403°W

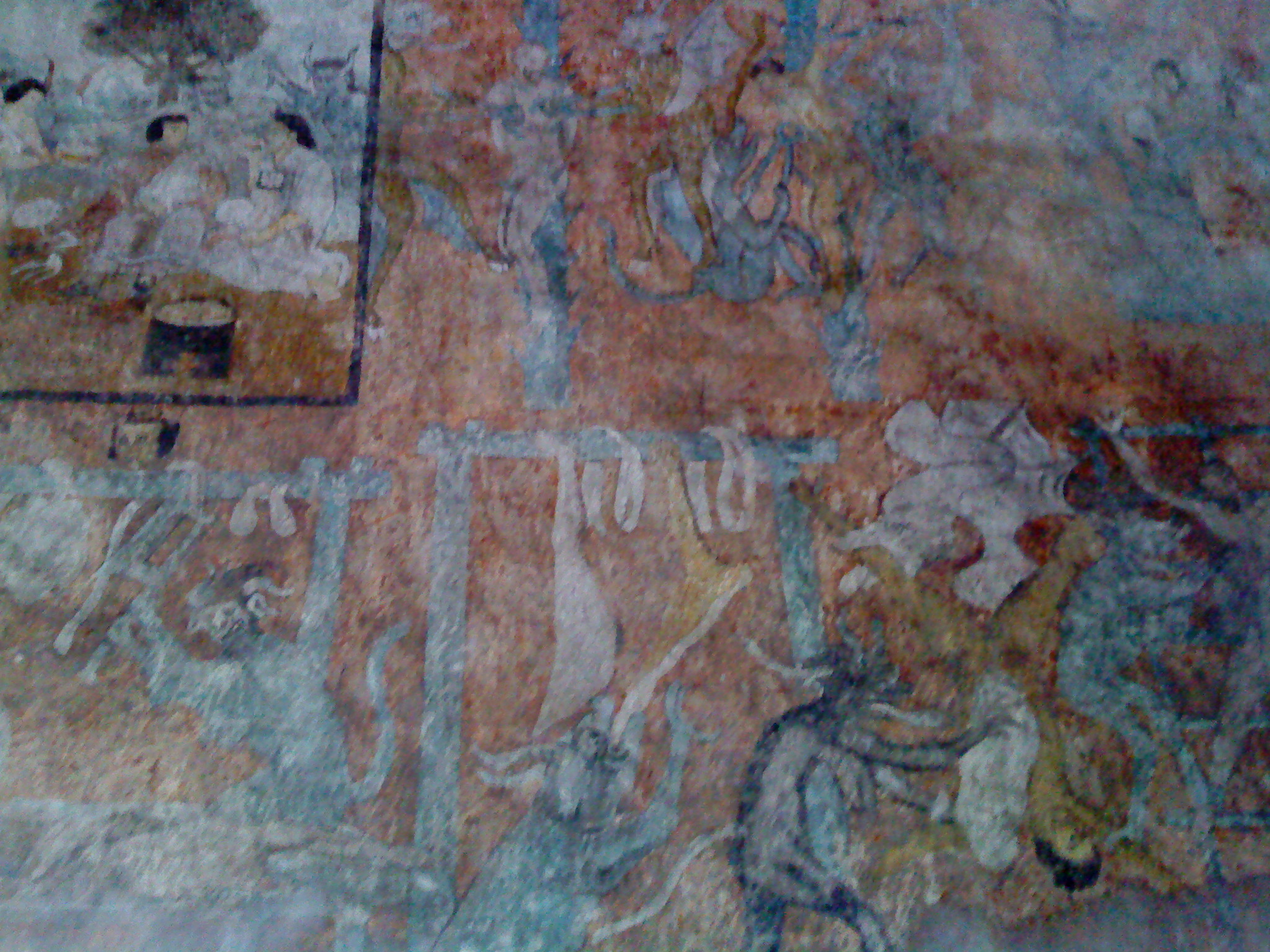
Xoxoteco mural in the church

The Iglesia de la Purísima Concepción ("Church of the Immaculate Conception'") is a church located in Santa María Xoxoteco, some 2.5 km (1.6 mi) east of San Agustín Metzquititlán, Hidalgo, Mexico. The church is noted for its 16th century Xoxoteco murals, which are considered unique in Latin America.
