= Metztitlán =

Metztitlán Otomi: Nziʼbatha Santos Reyes Metztitlan
- Town and municipality
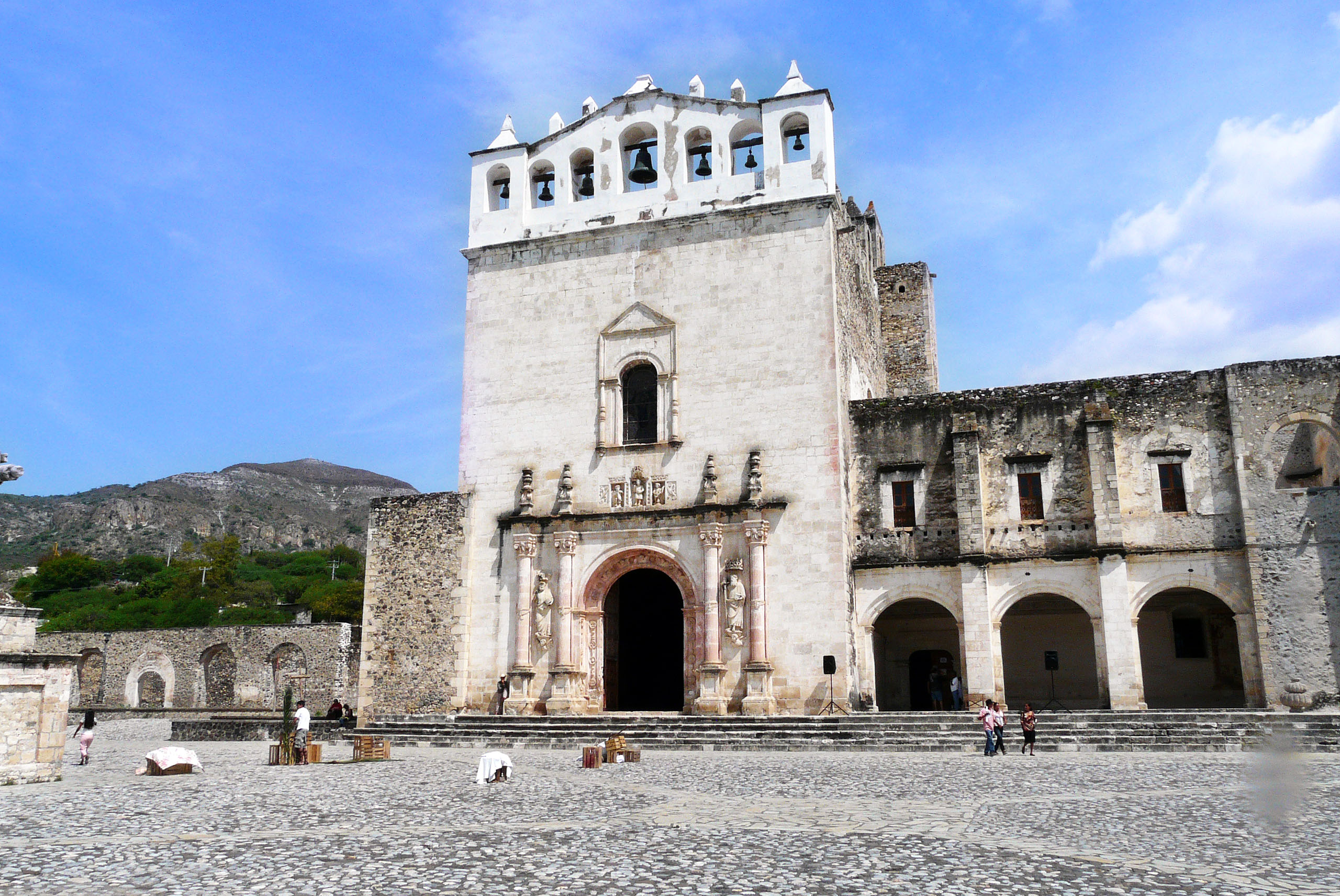

- Location within Hidalgo Location within Mexico
- Coordinates: 20°36′N 98°46′W
- Country: Mexico
- State: Hidalgo
- Municipality: Metztitlán
- Municipality: August 6, 1824

Government
  - Mayor: Susana Rivera Cano (2024-present)
  - Federal electoral district: Hidalgo's 3rd

Area
  - Total: 814.7 km^{2} (314.6 sq mi)

Population (2005)
  - Total: 20,123
  - Density: 26.3/km^{2} (68/sq mi)
- Time zone: UTC-6 (Zona Centro)
- Postal code: 43350
- Area code: 774
- Website: http://metztitlan.gob.mx/

Metztitlán (Otomi: Nziʼbatha) is a town and one of the 84 municipalities of Hidalgo, in central-eastern Mexico. The municipality covers an area of 814.7 km^{2}.

As of 2005, the municipality had a total population of 20,123.

In 2023, Metztitlán was designated a Pueblo Mágico by the federal government, recognizing its cultural and historical importance.

== Etymology ==
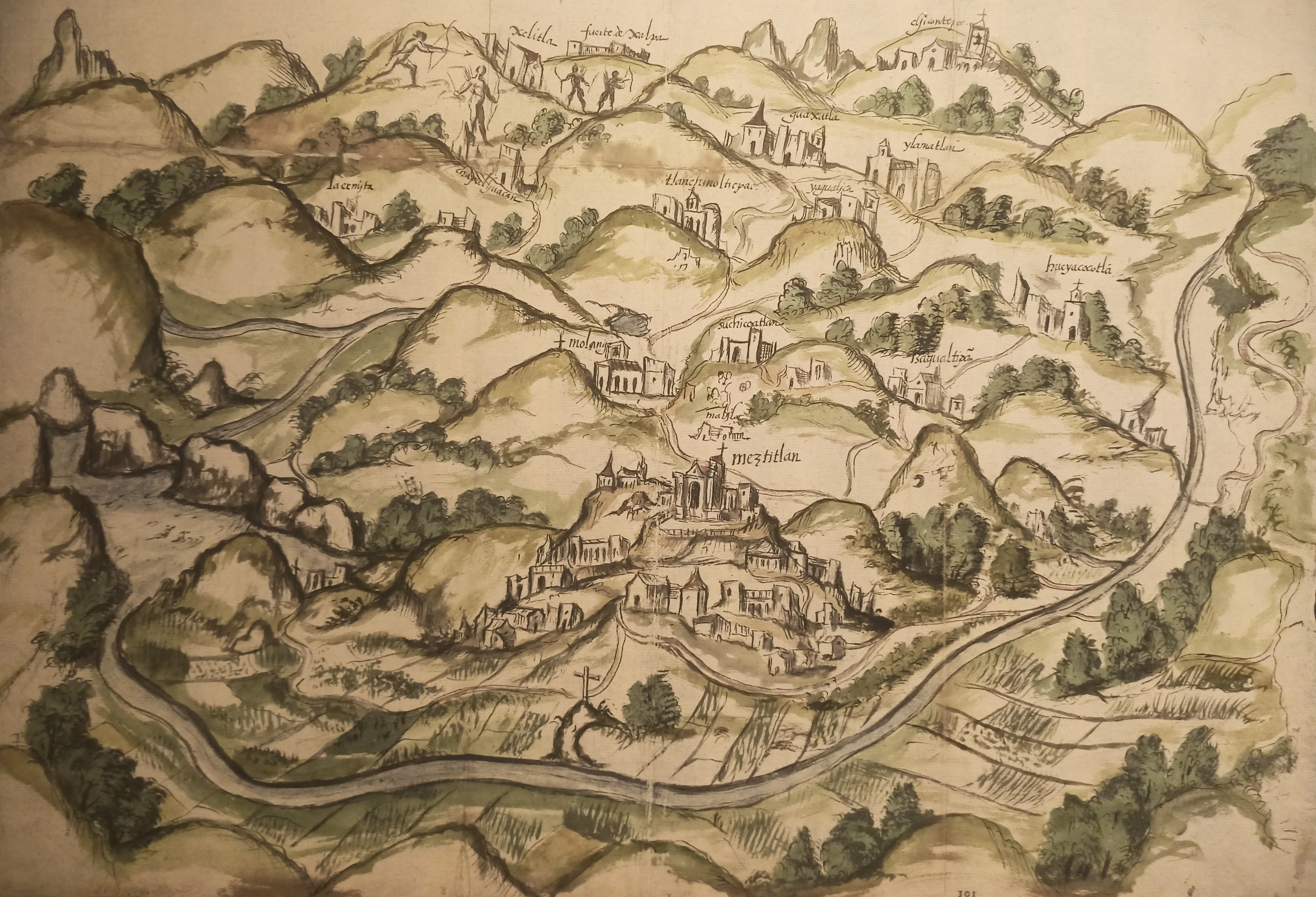
Map of Metztitlán - Geographical relations of the Indies (1579).

From Náhuatl Metztli 'moon' and tlan 'place' so its meaning would be: 'Place of the moon'. The town is named after the Aztec moon goddess, Metztli.

== History ==
=== Pre-Columbian ===
Before the Spanish colonization of the region in 1519, Metztitlán was the site of a powerful, independent Otomi state, unconquered by the Aztec Empire. According to Professor Michael E. Smith, this small kingdom's independence was fortified and maintained as a result of the mountainous terrain in the valley surrounding it. Professor Smith wrote that the factors behind the state's enduring independence was due to the fact that "there were few resources of interest to the (Aztec) Empire in this area, and the final emperors may have decided that Metztitlán was not worth the effort." The lunar deity Zäna was important in this town. Metztitlan used a calendar very similar to that of the Aztecs, but changing the names of a few days: xilotl "green ear of corn" instead of Aztec cuetzpalin, tzontecomatl "skull" instead of miquiztli, itlan (either "next to him" or "his tooth") instead of malinalli, cuixtli "kite (bird)" instead of cuauhtli, and teotl itonal "day of divinity" instead of cozcacuauhtli.

=== 16th century ===
Fray Juan de Sevilla established the first Augustinian monastery in Metztitlan in 1538 on lower ground near Lake Metztitlan. That small mission is today known as the Old Convent La Communidad with the remains of the church, convent and a third section occupied by the town government. Due to frequent flooding, the convent was moved to a higher location in the 1540s alleged to be the site of the pre-Columbian Temple of the Moon. The new site was permanently occupied by the 1550s and the massive conventual church completed in 1557.

The church "Convento de los Santos Reyes" is unique for its preservation of six colonial retalbos (altarpieces) and the only principal atarpiece retalbo to survive in the region. The main altarpiece retalbo was completed in 1700 and was the work of an indigenous artist Salvador Ocampo. It is fifty feet high and consists of five tiers (rows) divided into five calles (columns). The registers consist of 13 sculptures and reliefs and six paintings. Those of the Three Kings (Santos Reyes), the Crucifixion and Padre Eterno are reputed to have been painted by the hand of Ocampo himself.

=== Later history ===
In April and September 1811, two indigenous revolts occurred in the city, ending in the deaths of 1225 people. The city was elevated to municipal status in 1869.

== See also ==
- Barranca de Metztitlán
