= Jorge Rojo García de Alba =

Mexican politician (born 1963)

- Born: 24 June 1963 (age 62); Hidalgo, Mexico
- Occupation: Politician
- Political party: PRI

Jorge Rojo García de Alba (born 24 June 1963) is a Mexican politician from the Institutional Revolutionary Party (PRI). From 2009 to 2012 he served as a federal deputy in the 61st Congress, representing Hidalgo's third district.
