= Actopan Municipality, Hidalgo =

Municipality in Hidalgo, Mexico

Actopan
- Municipality
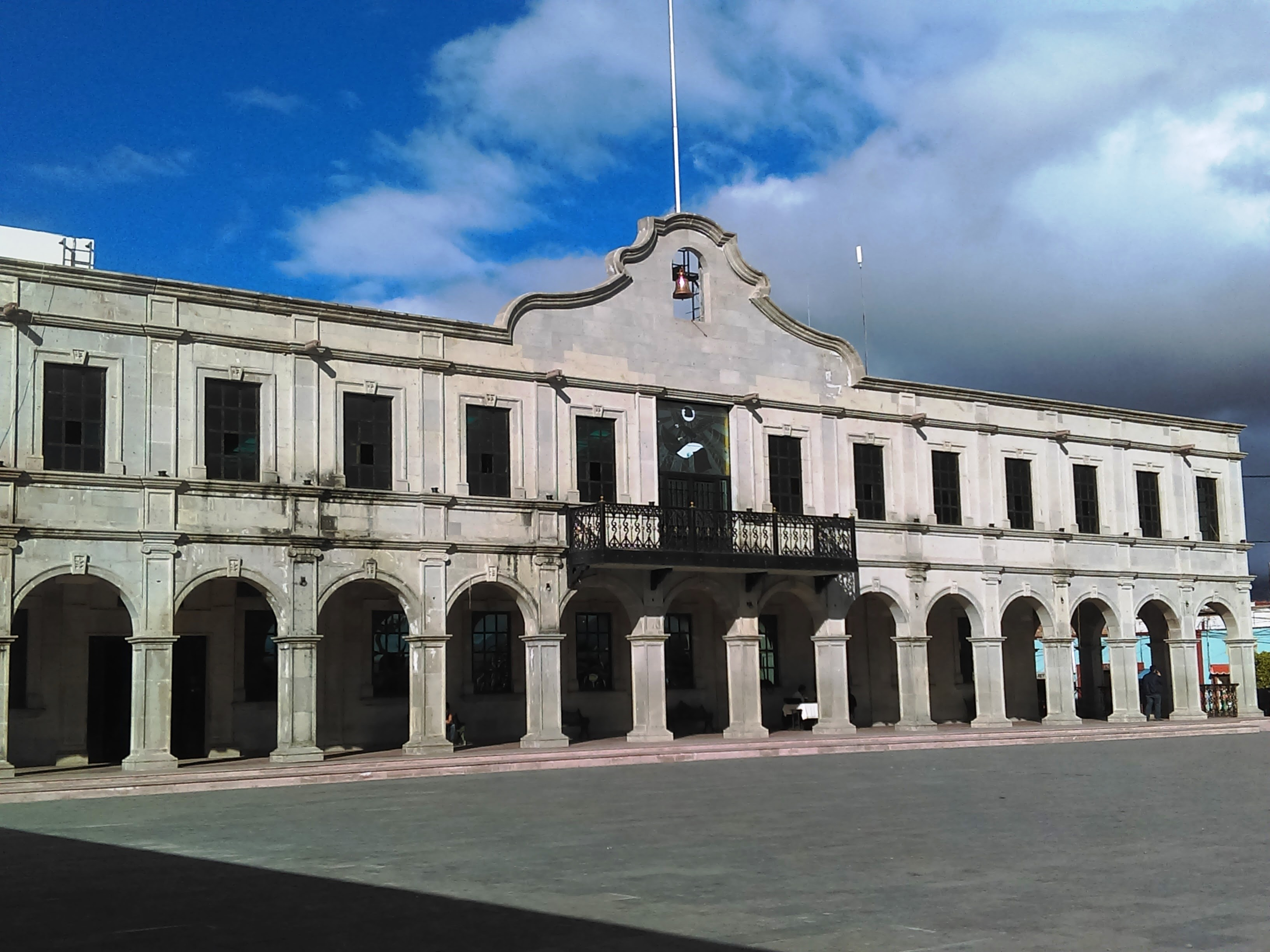
- Municipal Palace of Actopan

- Coat of arms

- Coordinates: 20°16′12″N 98°56′42″W
- Country: Mexico
- State: Hidalgo
- Municipal seat: Actopan

Government
  - Federal electoral district: Hidalgo's 3rd

Area
  - Total: 271.86 km^{2} (104.97 sq mi)

Population (2020)
  - Total: 61,002
- Time zone: UTC-6 (Zona Centro)
- Website: actopanhidalgo.gob.mx

Actopan (Otomi: Ma’yüts’i) is one of the 84 municipalities of Hidalgo, in central-eastern Mexico, whose municipal seat and most populated locality is Actopan. This municipality covers an area of 280.1 km^{2}. It is crossed by Federal Highway 85 that runs from Mexico City to Nuevo Laredo and it is located 30 km northwest of Pachuca, the capital city of the state of Hidalgo.

Actopan is known as the city of the convent and the land of the barbecue. Its name derives from the word “Atoctli” meaning “firm, fertile, and humid land” and the word “pan” meaning “on” or “over” in Nahuatl. Thus, the name Actopan comes to mean “on the firm, humid, and fertile land”.

Actopan’s original name in Otomi is “Ma'yüts'i” which translates to “my little pathway”.

== History ==
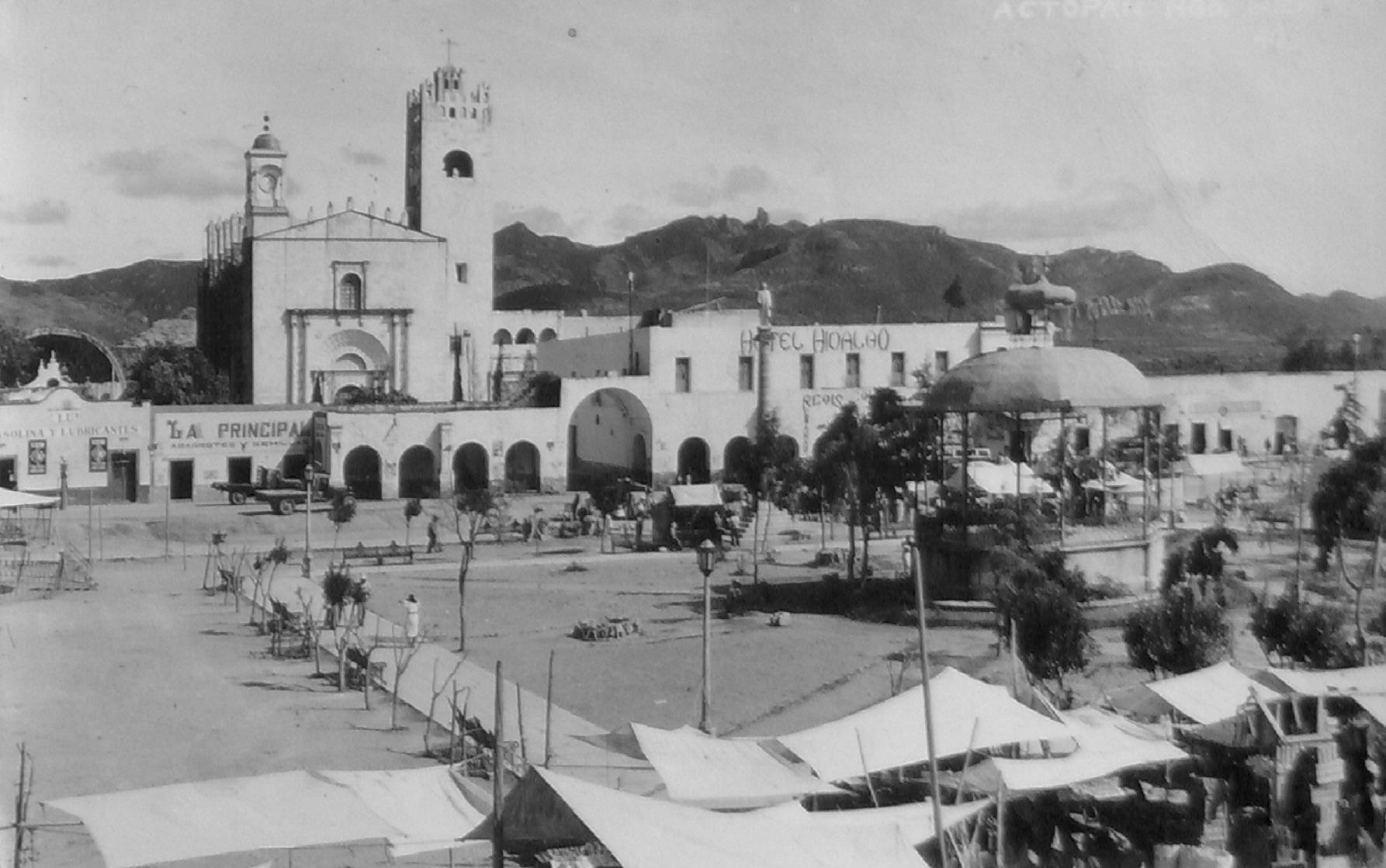
Actopan 1950.

It is estimated that the Toltecas arrived to an area close to Actopan in 674. By the year 1117, another indigenous group called the Chichimecas arrived to what is now Actopan and Mixquiahuila. In 1113, Xide gave Actopan the name “Mañutzi”. Actopan was under the rule of the chichimecas until the emperor Moctezuma II added the area that is now Actopan to his dominion. In 1521, the indigenous Otomies helped the leader Cuauhtémoc defend Mexico against Spanish colonizers.

Juan Gonzalez Ponce de Leon was one of the first Spaniards given encomendero status over Actopan in the early 1520s.

The movement to convert the population to Roman Catholicism begin in 1526 with the Augustine Friars. By the year 1548 the temple and monastery in Actopan had already been built. It was declared a historic and artistic monument on February 2, 1933.

In 1531 Actopan was put under the jurisdiction of the corregidor of Iscuincuitlapilco. By 1568 it was made a separate jurisdiction with its own alcaldia mayor. Yolotepec was also within these domains. As of 1791 the population consisted of 20,000 Indios, 2,291 mestizos, 54 pardos and 1,474 Spaniards (this would be both creoles and peninsulares, and probably included some people with some indigenous ancestry).

Actopan now consist of more than 20 communities, most of which names derive from the Otomi language.

=== Chronology of Important dates ===
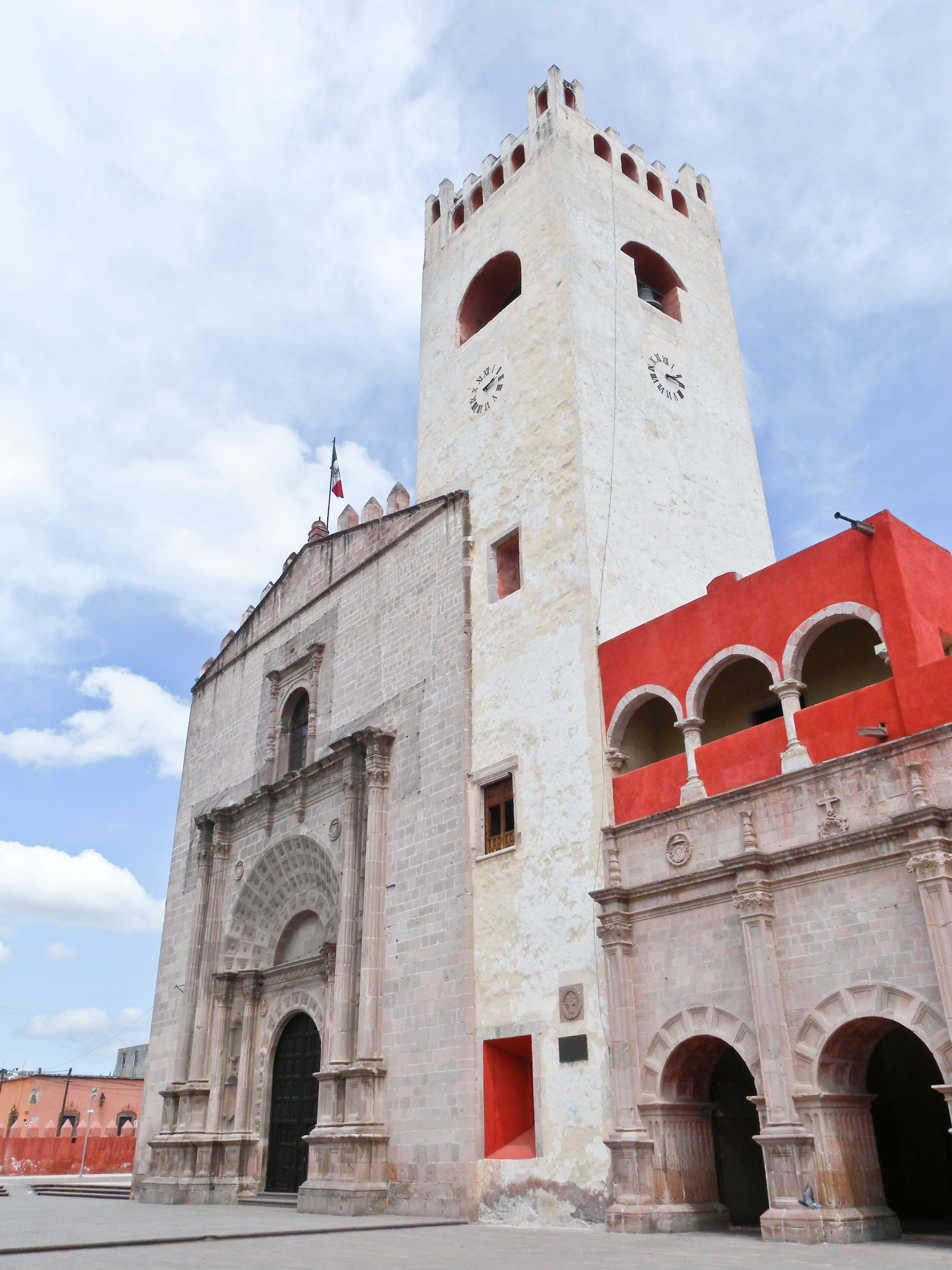
San Nicolás Tolentino Temple and Ex-Monastery.

- 1546: Actopan’s founding year.
- 1865: The state of Hidalgo is divided into 3 departments: Huejutla, Tulancingo and Tula.
- 1868: The then president of Mexico, Benito Juarez, created the state of Hidalgo.
- 10 May 1946: Actopan was declared a city.

== Geography ==
=== Climate ===
Climate data for Actopan
Month	Jan	Feb	Mar	Apr	May	Jun	Jul	Aug	Sep	Oct	Nov	Dec	Year
Mean daily maximum °C (°F)	22.3 (72.1)	24.2 (75.6)	27.1 (80.8)	28.6 (83.5)	28.7 (83.7)	26.5 (79.7)	25 (77)	25.2 (77.4)	24.3 (75.7)	23.7 (74.7)	23.1 (73.6)	22.4 (72.3)	25.1 (77.2)
Mean daily minimum °C (°F)	3.0 (37.4)	4 (39)	6 (43)	8.6 (47.5)	10.1 (50.2)	11.3 (52.3)	10.9 (51.6)	10.8 (51.4)	10.8 (51.4)	8.6 (47.5)	5.5 (41.9)	3.7 (38.7)	8 (46)
Average precipitation mm (inches)	10 (0.4)	5.1 (0.2)	10 (0.4)	28 (1.1)	41 (1.6)	66 (2.6)	64 (2.5)	51 (2)	64 (2.5)	38 (1.5)	10 (0.4)	5.1 (0.2)	390 (15.4)
Source: Weatherbase

== Sites of interest ==
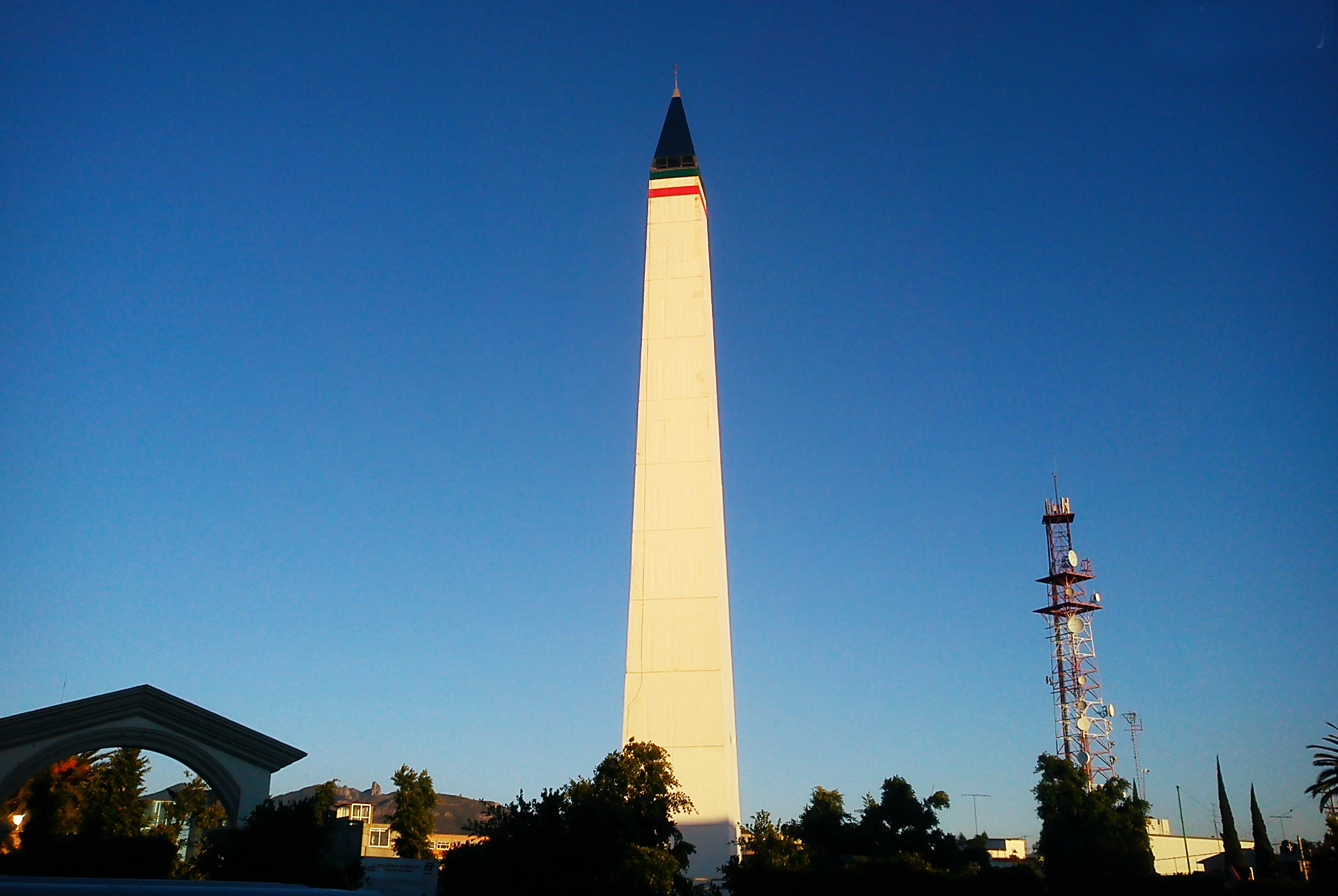
Obelisco.

San Nicolás Tolentino Temple and Ex-Monastery: This colonial building was built in 1546 under the direction of the Augustine Friars. The temple and ex-convent combine elements from the romantic, gothic and renaissance periods. Data from the year 1548 points to Frail Andres de Mata as the person in charge of the construction of the monument. The richness of the monument lies in the still-conserved mural paintings. The San Nicolas de Tolentino Temple and Ex-Monastery were declared a historic and artistic monument on February 2, 1933. It is located in the center of the city.

Puente De Dios: The site “Puente De Dios” is a natural attraction located in the northern part of the city. It is the product of an erosion from the Magdalena River. There is a pathway in the site for pedestrians and bikers to enjoy the flora and fauna found there.

Mirador del Obelisco: The mirador del obelisco is a slender stone pyramid. It was built as a commemoration to Mexico’s Bicentennial Independence Day celebration. It is known to be the fifth tallest obelisk in the world.

La Eroca: It is the biggest and most beautiful park in Actopan. The park has space for sport activities, an area for grilling, a pool, and public restrooms.

== Culture ==
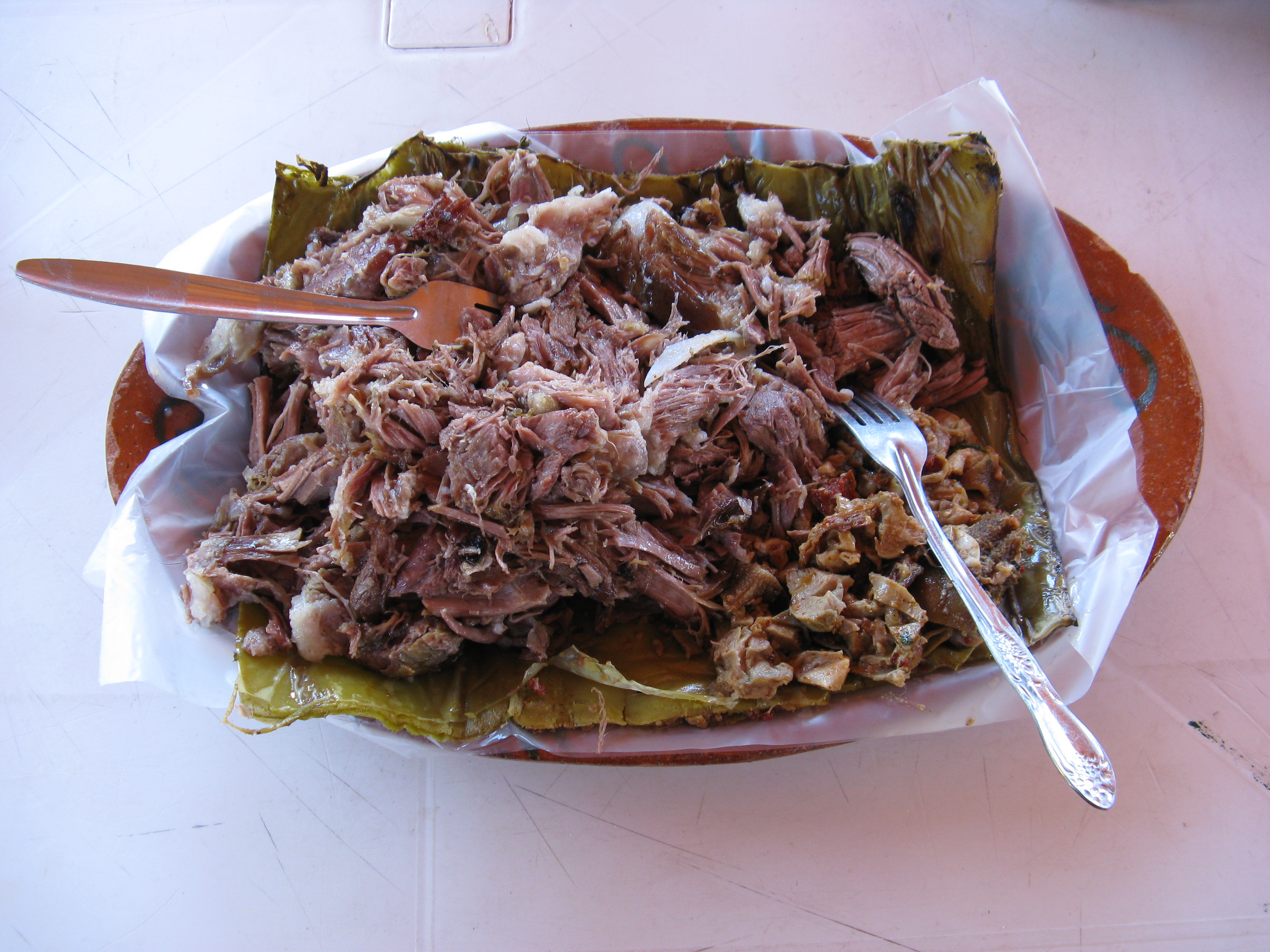
Barbacoa.

Foods: Actopan is a city full of culture and exquisite foods. It is known for its authentic barbecue dish. Unlike the typical beef barbecue, “Actopan-style” barbecue consist of sheep meat slowly cooked in an underground grill. Aside from this dish, other traditional dishes include: mole, ximbo, mixiotes, traditional candy, cheese, and pulque.

Celebrations: The festivities in Actopan are the celebration in honor of the San Nicolas de Tolentino patron that takes place on September 10. Another important festivity is the Day of the Dead celebration. During this holiday relatives bring flowers and food to their loved ones in the cemetery. The main festivity is the foundation of the town on July 8. This celebration include the use of mechanical games and castles that produce fireworks.

== Demography ==
As of 2015, the municipality had a total population of 56,429. About 3000 residents of the total population speak an indigenous language, mainly otomi. The principal religion is Roman Catholicism.
